= Avag Zakarian =

Atabeg
- In office 1227–1250
- Preceded by: Ivane I Zakarian
- Succeeded by: Ivane III Abuletisdze

Amirspasalar
- In office 1227–1250
- Preceded by: Ivane I Zakarian
- Succeeded by: Zakare III Zakarian

Personal details
- Born: Unknown
- Died: 1250
- Resting place: Haghpat Monastery
- Spouse: Gvantsa Kakhaberidze
- Children: Kuashak Zakarian; An illegitimate son
- Parent(s): Ivane I Zakarian (father); Khoshak (mother)

Military service
- Battles/wars: Khwarazmian–Georgian wars; Battle of Bolnisi; Mongol invasions of Georgia

Avag Zakarian (Georgian: ავაგ მხარგრძელი, romanized: avag mkhargrdzeli; Armenian: Ավագ Զաքարյան) (died 1250 AD) was an Armenian noble of the Zakarid line, and a Court official of the Kingdom of Georgia, as atabeg and amirspasalar of Georgia from 1227 to 1250.

The eastern areas Bjni, Gegharkunik, Vayots-dzor, Artsakh, Siunik, Nakhichevan, Dvin and Yerevan were under the jurisdiction of the atabeg Ivane Mkhargrdzeli and his son Avag. First Dvin and later Bjni were centres of this division. The subjects of Ivane's family were the Orbelians, Khaghbakians, Dopians, Hasan-Jalalyan and others.

== Biography ==
During Mongol invasion of Georgia in 1238-39 Queen Rusudan had to evacuate Tbilisi for Kutaisi, leaving eastern Georgia in the hands of atabeg Avag Mkhargrdzeli and Kakhetian lord, Egarslan Bakurtsikheli. The Mongol general Toghta was sent by Chaghatai to assault Avag's troops at the fortress of Kayan. After some resistance, Avag surrendered, and had to agree to pay tribute to the Mongols, and to provide let his troops join the Mongol army. Avag was the first of the Caucasian princes to submit to the Mongols, and was treated with great honor for his reddition, triggering the surrender of may more nobles in the rest of the campaign. The combined troops went on to Ani, the Armenian capital defended by Shahnshah Zakarian, but the city was eventually captured and destroyed.

Following this disastrous campaign of 1238-1239, the Armenians and Georgians made peace with the Mongols and agreed to pay them tribute and supply their troops (Georgian–Mongolian treaty of 1239).

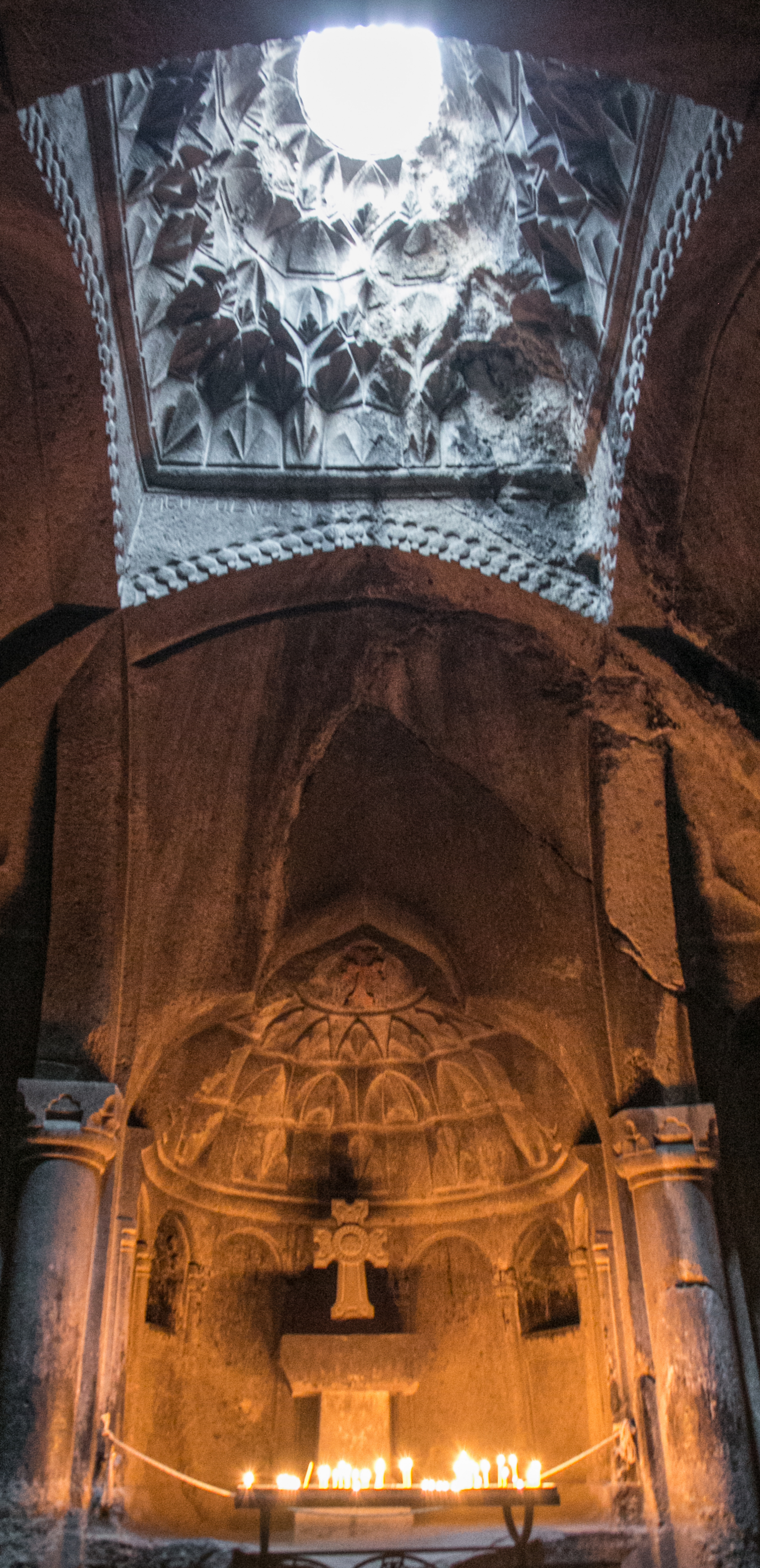
Geghard first rock-cut church, built under Avag during the Zakarid period, circa 1240.

Avag Mkhargrdzeli, who was raised by Queen Rusudan from the rank of spasalar to amirspasalar (Lord High Constable), and then to that of atabeg (tutor) arranged the submission of Queen Rusudan to the Mongols in 1243, and Georgia officially acknowledged the Great Khan as its overlord. During this period of interregnum (1245–1250), with the two Davids absent at the court of the Great Khan in Karakorum, the Mongols divided the Kingdom of Georgia into eight districts (tumen), one of them commanded by Avag Mkhargrdzeli. Exploiting the complicated issue of succession on Georgian throne, the Mongols had the Georgian nobles divided into two rival parties, each of which advocated their own candidate to the crown, where Avag was supporting candidacy of David Narin.

David VII of Georgia visited the estates of atabag Avag when he died, leaving no son behind, but only a daughter by the name of Khuashak/Khoshak. The King came to the funeral in Bjni and noticed the good-looking widow of Avag, Gvantsa. He fell in love with her and a little time later took her as his wife and Queen, and brought her to his kingdom. And he left Avag's daughter to govern her estate, entrusting her to the supervision of Sadun of Mankaberdi. Khoshak eventually married Shams al-Din Juvayni, who was vizier in the service of the Mongols.

Matosavank monastery was constructed with the oversight of Avag. He also built the "Rock-cut church with spring" c.1240 in the Geghard Monastery. The Kirants Monastery was also probably founded by Avag, who was a of Chalcedonian faith like his father. The frescoes of the monastery can be dated to the 1230s-1240s.

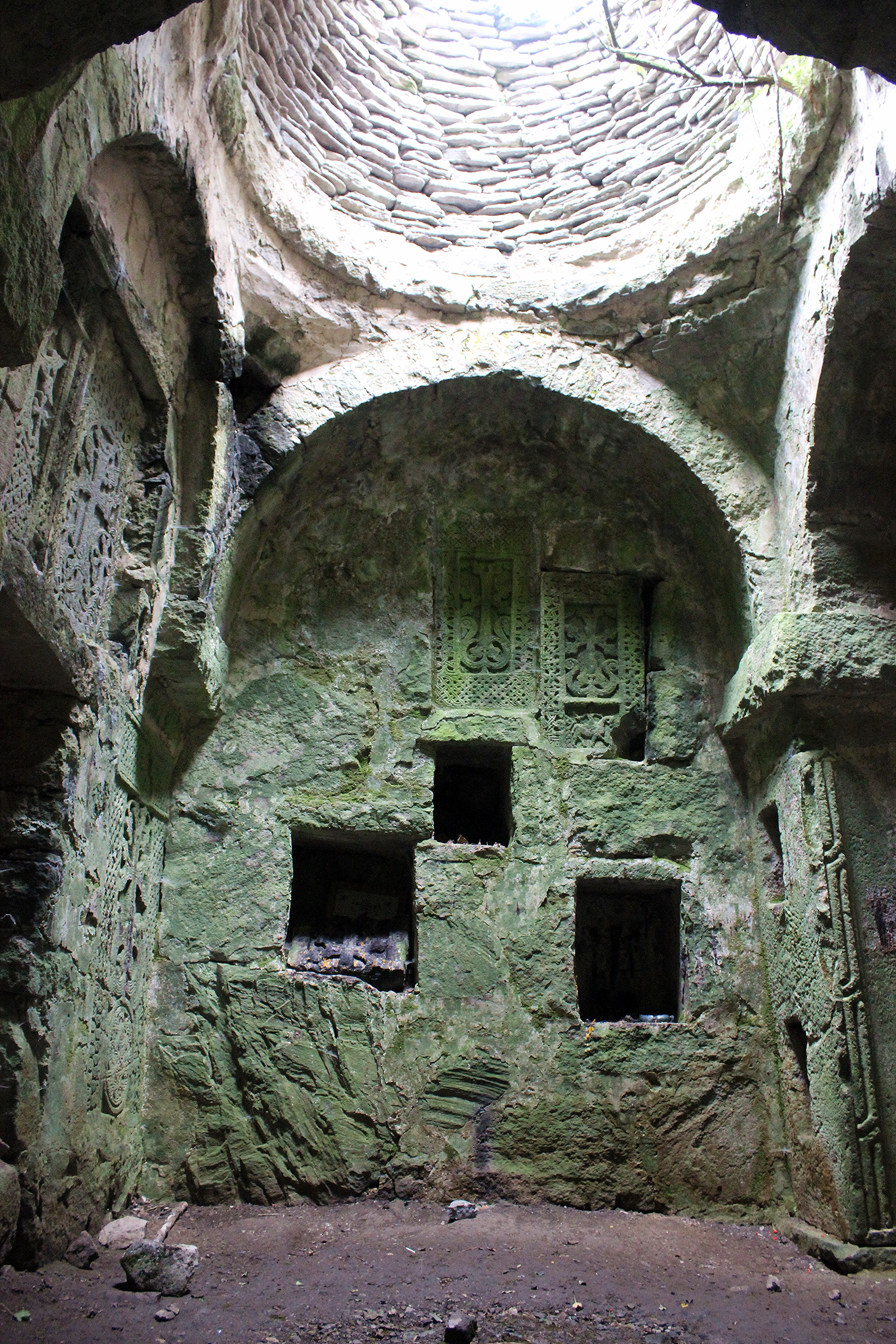
Matosavank monastery.
