= Court officials of the Kingdom of Georgia =

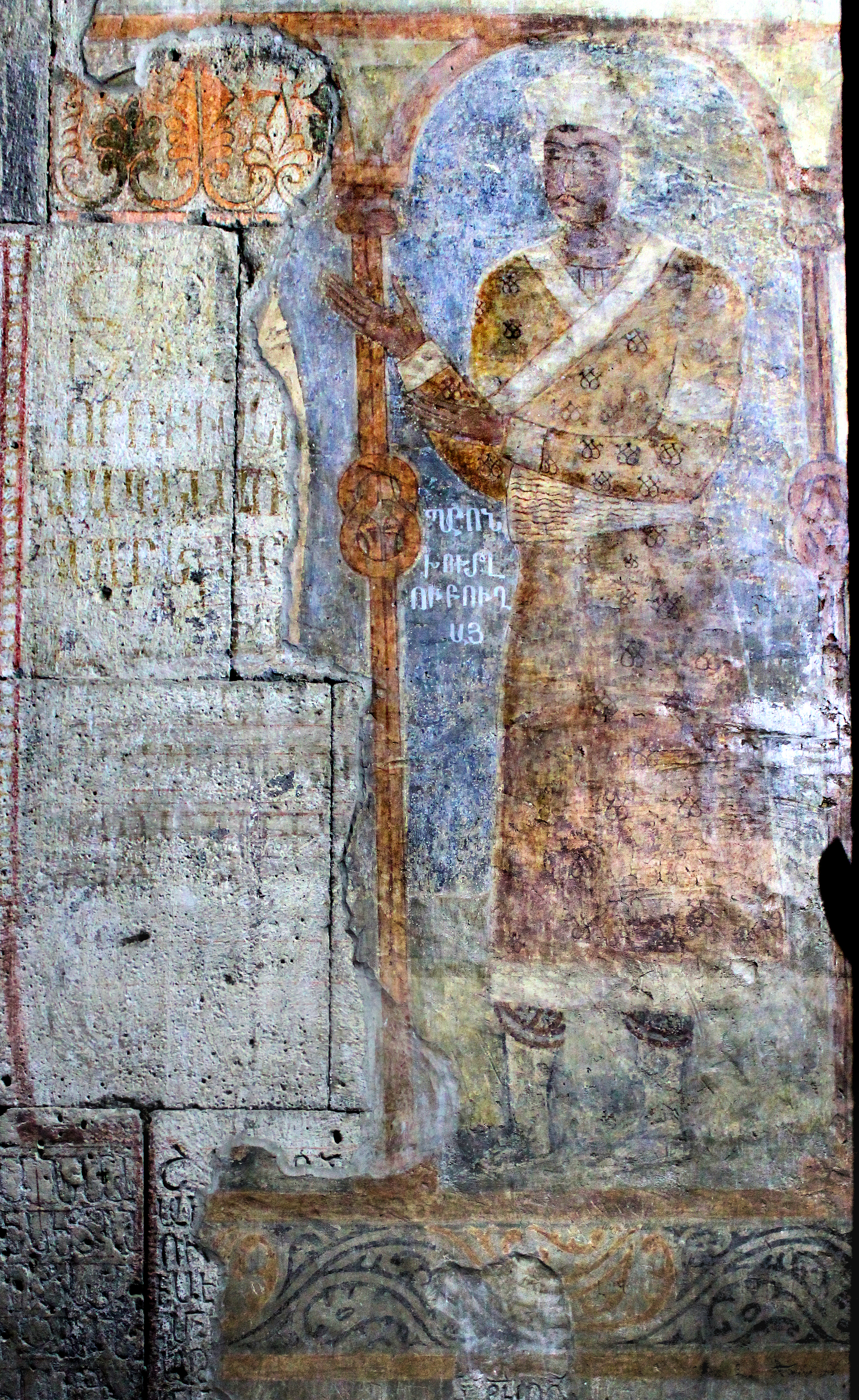
Khutlubuga was amirspasalar for the Kingdom of Georgia from 1289 to 1293. Church of the Holy Sign. Haghpat Monastery, southern wall. Late 13th century.

The court officials of the Kingdom of Georgia, were in charge of the royal court.

The chronological lists below are not exhaustive, since there exist large gaps in the historical record.

== Majordomo ==
The majordomo (Georgian: msakhurtukhutsesi) was the chief official of the court.

Name	First record in office	Final record in office	Title(s)
Apridon	1178	1184	
Vardan I Dadiani	1185	1911	
Ivane I Zakarian	1191	1207	
Vache I Vachutian	1207	?	
Vahram Gageli	1212	1230	
Manavel (son of Vache)	1230	1245	
Grigol Surameli	1245	1260	
Bega II Surameli	1260	1280	
Hamada Surameli	1280	1290	

== Chancellor ==
The Chancellor (Georgian: mtsignobartukhutsesi) was the head of the government.

Name	First record in office	Final record in office	Title(s)
George of Chqondidi	1105	1118	
Svimeon	1118	1140	
John		1179	
Anton Gnolistavisdze	1177	1204	
Michael IV of Georgia	1184	1185/6	
Theodore II of Georgia	1204	1207	
Arsen of Georgia	1063	1248	
Basil	1250	1265	

== Treasurer ==
The treasurer (Georgian: mechurchletukhutsesi) was the official responsible for running the treasury.

Fresco of Rustaveli in the Monastery of the Cross in Jerusalem

Name	First record in office	Final record in office	Title(s)
Ivane III Vardanisdze			
Ivane Kolonkelisdze		1177/1178	
Qutlu Arslan	1177	1185	
Kakhaber Vardanisdze	1185		
Abulasan	1185	1188	
Shalva Akhaltsikheli	1212	1222	
Shota Rustaveli			
Ivane I Jaqeli	1191	1247	
Gamrekeli Toreli	1241		
Mamucha	1241/1242		
Kakha III Toreli	1250s	1270s	

== Master of ceremonies ==
The master of ceremonies (Georgian: Mandaturtukhutsesi) was responsible for conducting ceremonies such as coronations and receptions of foreign ambassadors.

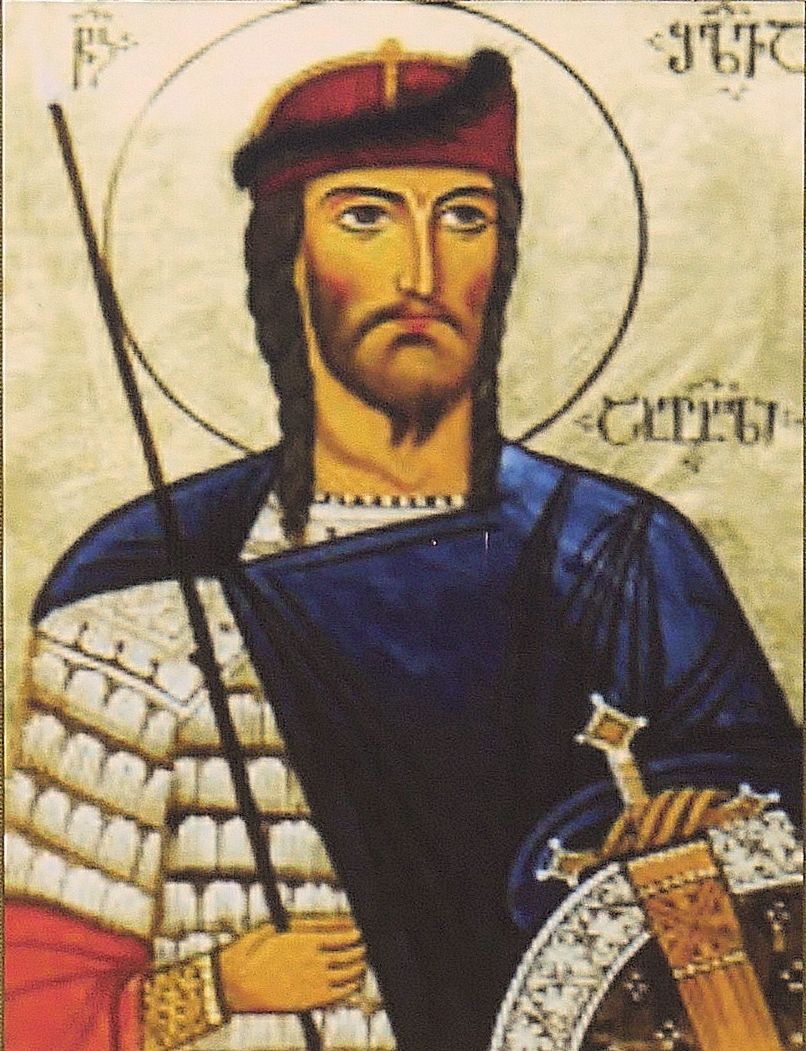
Shalva Akhaltsikheli, Mandaturtukhutsesi from 1202/03 to 1215

Name	First record in office	Final record in office	Title(s)
Ivane III Vardanisdze			
Ivane I Orbeli			
Sumbat I Orbeli		1155	
Ivane II Orbeli	1160	1178	
Kubasar	1178	1184	
Chiaber	1185	1195	
Zakare II Zakarian	1195	1202/03	
Shalva Akhaltsikheli	1202/03	1215	
Shahnshah Zakarian	1223	1261	
Avag-Sargis III Zakarian	1261	1268	
Ivane II Zakarian	1268	1285	
Beka I Jaqeli	1285	1308	
Sargis II Jaqeli	1308	1334	

== Marshal ==
The marshal (Georgian: amirspasalar) had charge of the royal stables, i.e. "Commander-in-Chief" of the army.

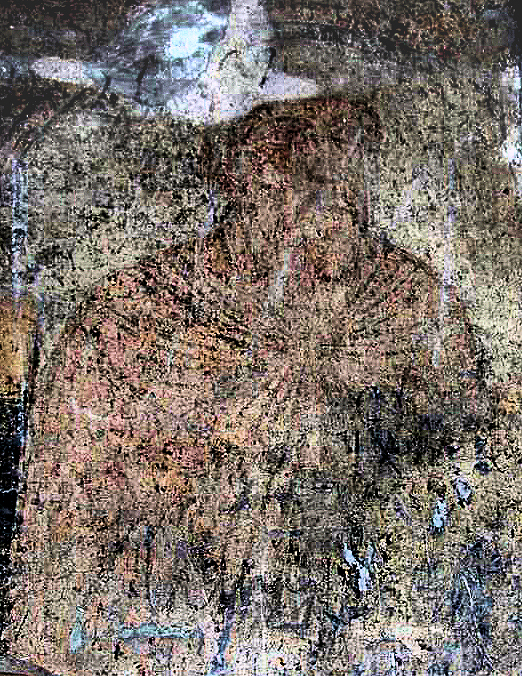
Probable mural of Shahnshah Zakarian, amirspasalar in 1240, as a donator at Kobayr Monastery Chapel, painted in the 1270s.

Name	First record in office	Final record in office	Title(s)
Ivane I Orbeli		1128	
Sumbat I Orbeli	1128	1155	
Kirkash Abuletisdze	1155	1156	
Ivane II Orbeli	1156	1178	
Kubasar	1178	1184	
Sargis Zakarian	1185	1187	
Gamrekeli Toreli	1187	1189	
Chiaber	1090	1091	
Zakare II Zakarian	1191	1212	
Shahnshah Zakarian	1212	1240	
Avag Zakarian	1242	1250	
Zakare III Zakarian	1250	1262	
Ivane III Abuletisdze	1260	1272	
Sadun of Mankaberd	1272	1281/1282	
Khutlubuga	1289	1293	
Mkhargrdzeli (son of Shanshe I)	1285		
Shahnshah II Zakarian	1290	1310	
Qvarqvare I Jaqeli	1334	1361	
Aghbugha I Jaqeli	1361	1391	

== Tutor ==
The tutor (Georgian: atabeg) came to be denominated as Samtskhe-Saatabago, the latter element meaning "of the atabags".

Name	First record in office	Final record in office	Title(s)
Ivane I Zakarian	1207	1227	
Avag Zakarian	1227	1250	
Zakare III Zakarian	1250	1260	
Ivane III Abuletisdze	1260	1272	
Sadun of Mankaberd	1272	1281/1282	
Tarsaich Orbelian	1284	1289	
Mkhargrdzeli (grandson of Shanshe I)	1285		
Khutlubugha	1292	1293	
Shahnshah II Zakarian	1294	1306	
Sargis II Jaqeli	1306	1334	
Aghbugha I Jaqeli	1361	1391	

== Feudal office/title ==
- Spaspet
- Tavadi

== Sources ==
- ცენტრალური და ადგილობრივი სამოხელეო წყობა შუა საუკუნეების საქართველოში
