= Shahnshah II Zakarian =

Member of the Armenian Zakarid dynasty, and Georgian Court official

Shahnshah II Zakarian Շահնշահ Բ Զաքարյան

Amirspasalar
- In office 1290–1310
- Succeeded by: Qvarqvare I Jaqeli

Atabeg
- In office 1294–1306
- Preceded by: Khutlubuga
- Succeeded by: Sargis II Jaqeli

Personal details
- Spouse: Kuandze
- Parent: Ivane II Zakarian

Shahnshah II Zakarian was a member of the Armenian Zakarid dynasty, and a Court official of the Kingdom of Georgia, holding the office of amirspasalar (Commander-in-Chief) and atabeg (Governor General) of Georgia.

== Biography ==
He was the son of Ivane II Zakarian and grandson of Shahnshah Zakarian, he was one of the active participants in the political events of that time. He was an apostle to Beka I Jaqeli, so that he could send the Prince George (the future George V) to be brought up with him. The chronicler mentions Shahnshah a member of the Mongol punitive expedition against King David VIII. "Atabeg-Amirspasalar Shahansha" is mentioned in one of the Armenian inscriptions of 1310 AD, and only as Atabeg in the Georgian-language epitaph on the tombstone of his brother, Atabeg Vahram.

=== His wife Kuandze ===
The wife of Shahnshah II Zakarian was named Kuandze and was the daughter of the Armenian Princes Khoshak and Shams al-Din Juvayni, an Il-Khanid Sahib Divan, "the highest ranking officials in the hierarchical system of the II-khanid state", responsible for finance. Khuandze is known from an inscription at Ani.

Kuandze is also known from an inscription at the Church of the Holy Apostles at Ani:

In 769 (ie 1320), by the mercy of God, I Khouandze, wife of Atabek Shahnchah (II) who died in this year, and caused us and our eastern country a great affliction, me, his wife, daughter of Chamchadin Sahip-Divan and of the Baroness Khorichah, (great-) granddaughter of the Atabek Ivane (I), as well as my son Zacharia (IV), for the salvation of the soul of the master and for the longevity of my brothers, we have waived in our heritage town of Ani the right to the counting of cows and donkeys, as well as on large and small entry permits. Anyone who attempts to put an obstacle to our dispositions, whether he is Armenian, Georgian or Mongolian, may he be judged and condemned by God, may he share the fate of Satan and may he be his co-inhabitant of the gehenna; let the Georgian be excommunicated and cursed; the Mongol be covered with shame and guilt before the prophets glorified in God; but may those who observe our provisions until the end of the world be blessed by Almighty God. Let anyone who opposes it be anathema, like Judas and like Cain. These favors and this charity were established under the government of Baron Lip. Ptough the scribe.

— Inscription of Kuandze at the Church of the Holy Apostles at Ani, 1320.
