= Georgian–Mongolian treaty of 1239 =

1239 treaty between Georgia and the Mongol Empire

Treaty of 1239
Georgian–Mongolian treaty of 1239
- Signed: 1239
- Location: Sarai, Golden Horde
- Condition: Rusudan had to accept the sovereignty of the Mongol Empire.
- Signatories: Batu Khan; Queen Rusudan
- Parties: Kingdom of Georgia; Mongol Empire
- Language: Mongolian (?)

In 1235–1236, Mongol forces, unlike their first raid in 1221, appeared with the sole purpose of conquest and occupation of Kingdom of Georgia and easily overran the already devastated kingdom. Queen Rusudan fled to the security of western Georgia, while the nobles secluded themselves in their fortresses.

During 1238, the Mongols under general Chormaqan conquered numerous fortresses and cities in the southern part of the Georgian Kingdom, with Georgia unable to mount any significant resistance. The assault continued in 1239, resulting in the fall of Lori Berd and Kayan. Avag Zakarian, Commander-in-Chief (amirspasalar) and Governor General (Atabeg) of the Georgian kingdom was trapped in Kayan and surrendered in the name of all of Georgia, agreeing to pay tribute and to let his troops join the Mongol army. The Mongols continued with the capture of Dmanisi, the fortress of Samshvilde southwest of Tiflis, and Tiflis surrendered after Queen Rusudan had fled, followed by the destruction of Ani and the surrender of Kars.

Finally, after this catastrophic campaign, the nobles of Armenia and Georgia surrendered to the Mongols, agreeing to pay tribute, and to provide their cavalry for Mongol military campaigns. On Ivane I Jaqeli's advice, Rusudan sent four envoys; her amirspasalar (commander-in-chief) and atabeg (tutor) Avag Zakarian, the mandaturtukhutsesi (grand master of ceremonies) Shahnshah Zakarian], the msakhurtukhutsesi (majordomo) Vahram Gageli and Eristavi (duke) of Hereti Shota Kupri), to negotiate surrender to Chaghatai. The Mongol leader received the envoys graciously and released Georgian prisoners.

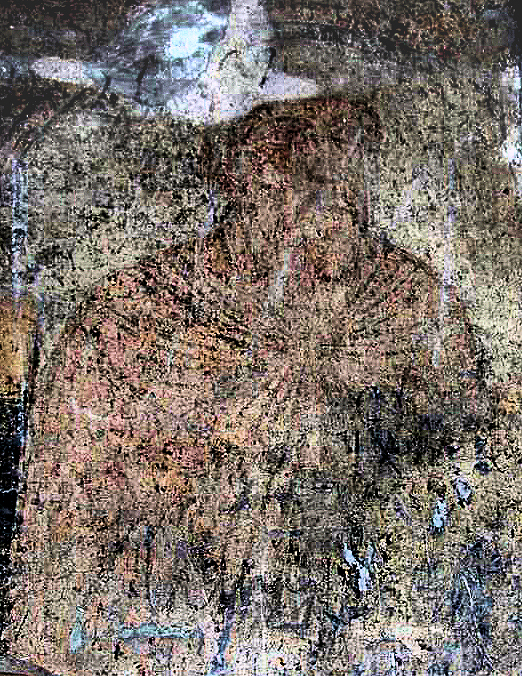
The Armenian Shahnshah Zakarian, mandaturtukhutsesi (grand master of ceremonies) at the Georgian court, participated in the negotiations.

To ensure her personal immunity, Rusudan set off with Arsen, bishop of Chqondidi and mtsignobartukhutsesi (chancellor), on the long trek to Batu Khan's capital on the Volga and peace treaty was signed on following terms:

- Georgian nobles would rank equally with the Mongol noyans (lords);
- Georgia would lose its Muslim vassals (like Shirvan), but could keep its Christian (like Armenia) territory;
- Georgia would pay annual tribute of 50,000 Hyperpyron (about 250 kilos of gold) and additionally pay various taxes;
- Georgia would provide soldiers for the Mongol army (Kheshig);
- David, Rusudan's son, was recognized as Rusudan's heir apparent;

Chormaqan agreed to the terms of the redition, and left a commander named Qara Buqa in charge of dismantling all fortresses.
