= Avag-Sargis III Zakarian =

Avag-Sargis Zakarian Ավագ-Սարգիս Զաքարյան
- Noble family: Mkhargrdzeli
- Father: Shanshe Mkhargrdzeli

Avag-Sargis Zakarian (Armenian: Ավագ-Սարգիս Զաքարյան) or Avag-Sargis Mkhargrdzeli (Georgian: ავაგ-სარგის მხარგრძელი, romanized: avag-sargis mkhargrdzeli) (died 1268 AD) was an Armenian noble of the Zakarid line, and a Court official of the Kingdom of Georgia bearing titles of mandaturtukhutsesi and amirspasalar (Commander-in-Chief of the army). He is known for signing famous "Rkoni Charter".

== Sources ==
- Shoshiashvili, N., Georgian Soviet Encyclopedia, vol. 7, p. 271. Tbilisi, 1984
- Ivane Javakhishvili, History of Georgian nation, Volume II-III, Tbilisi, 1965-1966
- Джанашиа С. Н., Об одном примере искажения исторической правды ... , Тб., 1947;
