= Zakare III Zakarian =

Georgian noble of Armenian descent

Zakare III Zakarian Զաքարիա Գ Զաքարյան
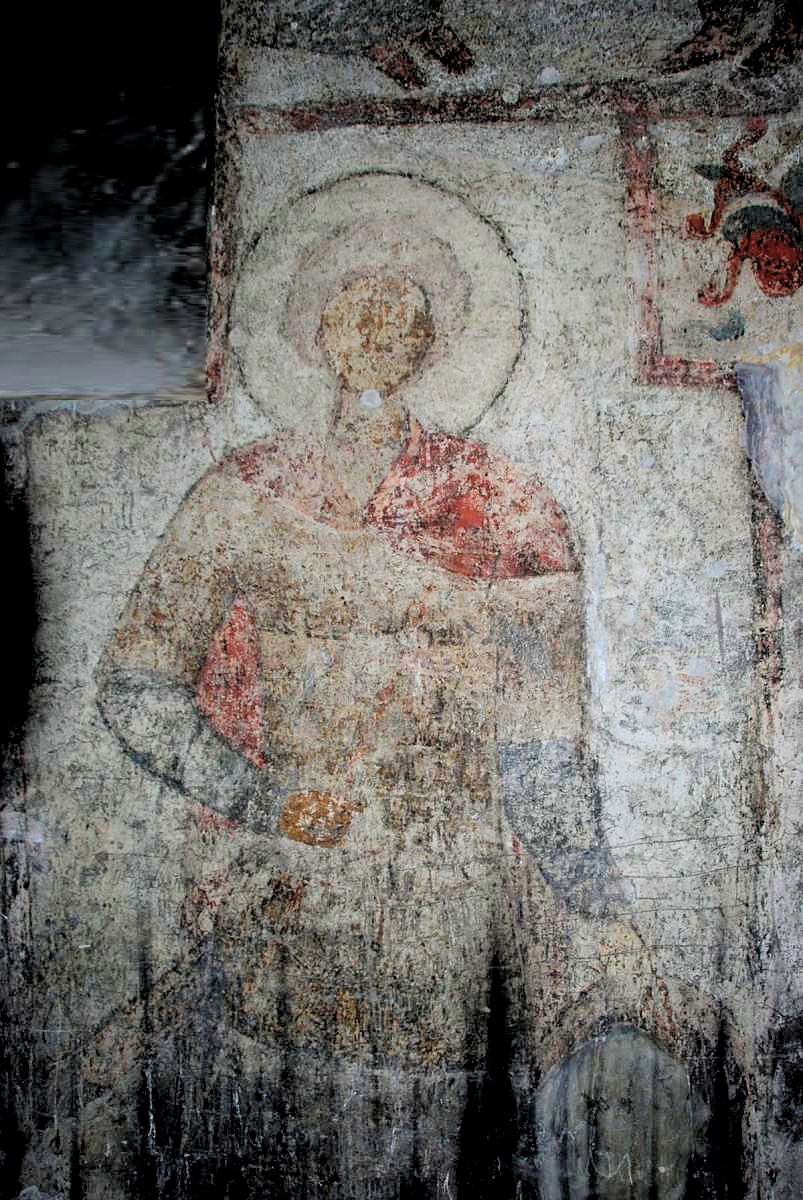
- Mural of a military man, from the Chapel at Kobayr Monastery, painted in the 1270s.

Amirspasalar
- In office 1250–1261
- Preceded by: Avag Zakarian
- Succeeded by: Ivane III Abuletisdze

Personal details
- Born: Unknown
- Died: 1261
- Resting place: Kobayr monastery
- Spouse: Sargis I Jaqeli's daughter
- Parent: Shahnshah Zakarian

Military service
- Battles/wars: Siege of Baghdad

Zakare III Zakarian (Armenian: Զաքարիա Գ Զաքարյան; Georgian: ზაქარია III მხარგრძელი, romanized: zakaria III mkhargrdzeli) (died 1261 AD) was a 13th century Armenian noble and a Court official of the Kingdom of Georgia, holding the position of amirspasalar (Commander-in-Chief) for the Georgian army.

== Family ==
He was a son of the noble Shahnshah Zakarian, and a member of the Zakarid dynasty. He was married to the daughter of Sargis I Jaqeli, duke of Samtskhe. He was one of the main Greater Armenian lords to implement the alliance between his suzerain the Georgian King David VII and the Mongol Prince Hulegu, during the Mongol conquest of the Middle East (1258-1260). Others included the Georgian leader Hasan Brosh, Prince of Kakheti and son of Vasak Xaxbakean, and Sevadin, son of Grigor Xachenac'i.

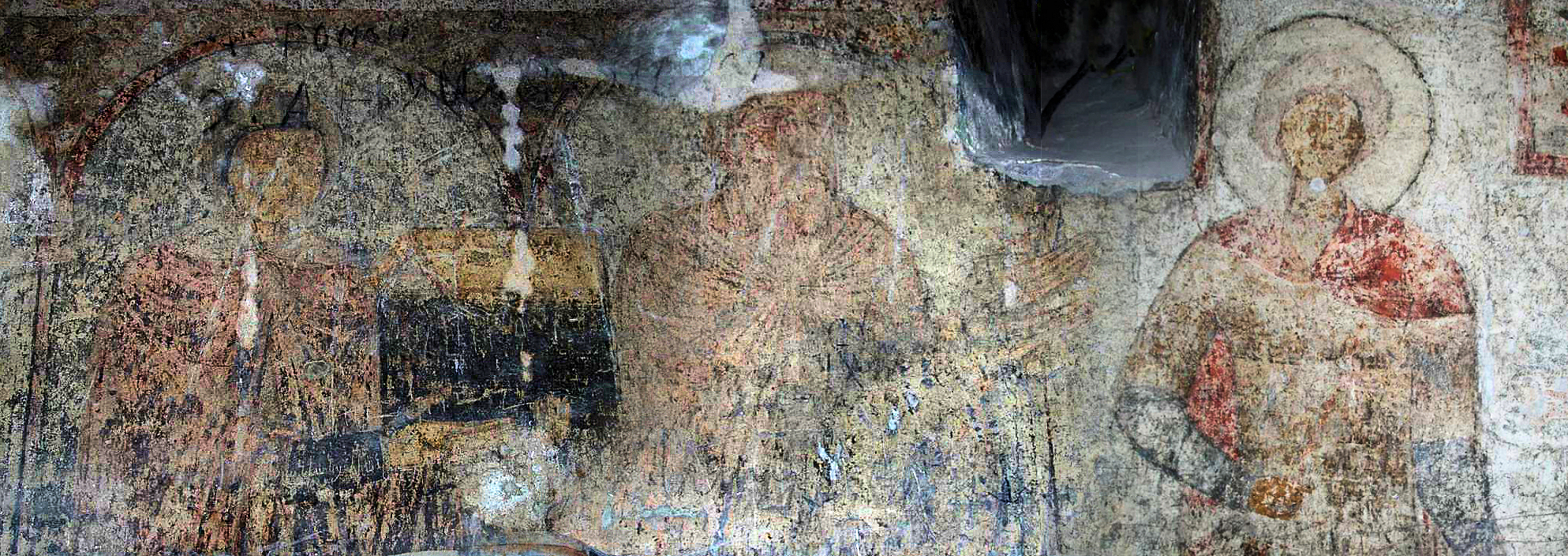
Probable depictions of Shahnshah's wife Vaneni (left) and her husband Shahnshah Zakarian (middle), with a kindred in military uniform (right), as donators at the Kobayr Monastery Chapel-Aisle.

== Biography ==
King David VII made Zakare, son of Shahnshah Zakarian, an escort for his journey to Karakorum, where Zakare attended on an official recognition of David by Güyük Khan. According to the 13th century historian Juvayni:

From Khitai there came emirs and officials; and from Transoxiana and Turkestan the emir Masʿud accompanied by grandees of that region. With the emir Arghun there came the celebrities and notables of Khorasan, Iraq, Lur, Azerbaijan and Shirvan. From Rum came Sultan Rukn al-Din and the Sultan of Takavor (Trebizond); from Georgia, the two Davits; from Aleppo, the brother of the Lord of Aleppo; from Mosul, the envoy of Sultan Badr al-Din Luʾluʾ; and from the city of Peace, Baghdad, the chief qadi Fakhr al-Din. There also came the Sultan of Erzurum, envoys from the Franks, and from Kerman and Fars also; and from ʿAla al-Din of Alamut, his governors in Quhistan, Shihab al-Din and Shams al-Din. And all this great assembly came with such baggage as befitted a court; and there came also from other directions so many envoys and messengers that two thousand felt tents had been made ready for them: there came also merchants with the rare and precious things that are produced in the East and the West.

— Juvayni, 1: 249–50.

=== Siege of Baghdad (1258) ===
Depiction of the Siege of Baghdad in Rashid al-Din's Jami al-tawarikh; the soldiers on the pontoons block the dawatdar from escaping down the Tigris.

In 1258, Zakare participated in the Siege of Baghdad organized by Hulegu Khan, together with Prince Prosh Khaghbakian. They participated in the capture of the city and the massacre of its inhabitants, but the Christians were spared. According to Bar Hebraeus, the Georgians, who had been recognized warriors among the Mongols since the 1240s, 'especially effected a great slaughter'. From the Christian point of view, the conquest of Baghdad was considered as a "divine revenge" against the Caliphate.

In 1260, Hulegu Khan requested from David VII Ulu to support him in the war against Mamluk Sultanate in Cairo. David, remembering the Georgian losses at Baghdad refused to comply and revolted against his Mongol overlord. It happened that Zakare was with Mongol general Arghun Aqa. However he went unbeknownst to Arghun to see his wife who was with her father Sargis I Jaqeli, one of the rebels. When Arghun learned about this, he notified Hulegu, who himself ordered that Zakare be taken shackled. Zakare was executed, while his father Shahnshah was freed for a ransom.

== Mural paintings ==
The family members of the Zakarian family, including Zakare, Ivane, Shahnshah or Khutlubuga, are thought to be depicted in the murals of the Haghpat Monastery, and inside the arches at the Kobayr Monastery (1282). Khutlubuga in particular is directly attested through an inscription and a relatively well preserved mural, renforcing the suggestion that other close members of the dynasty were also depicted with him.

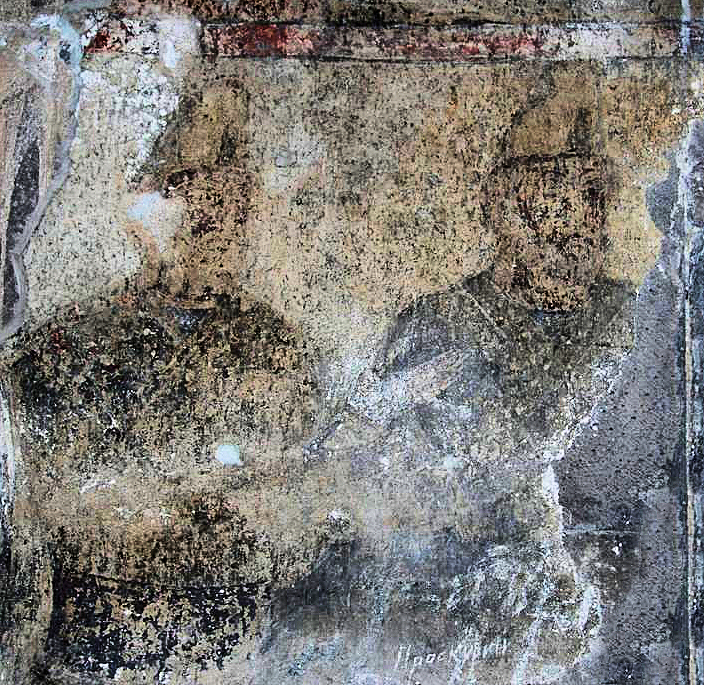
Kobayr fresco (men in uniform). Chapel

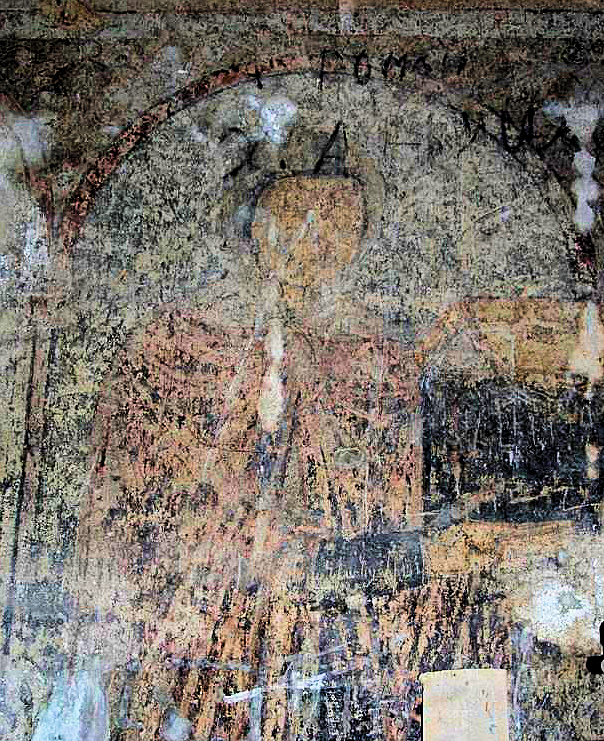
Probable mural of Shahnshah's wife, and Zakare III's mother. Kobayr Monastery's Chapel, painted in the 1270s. .

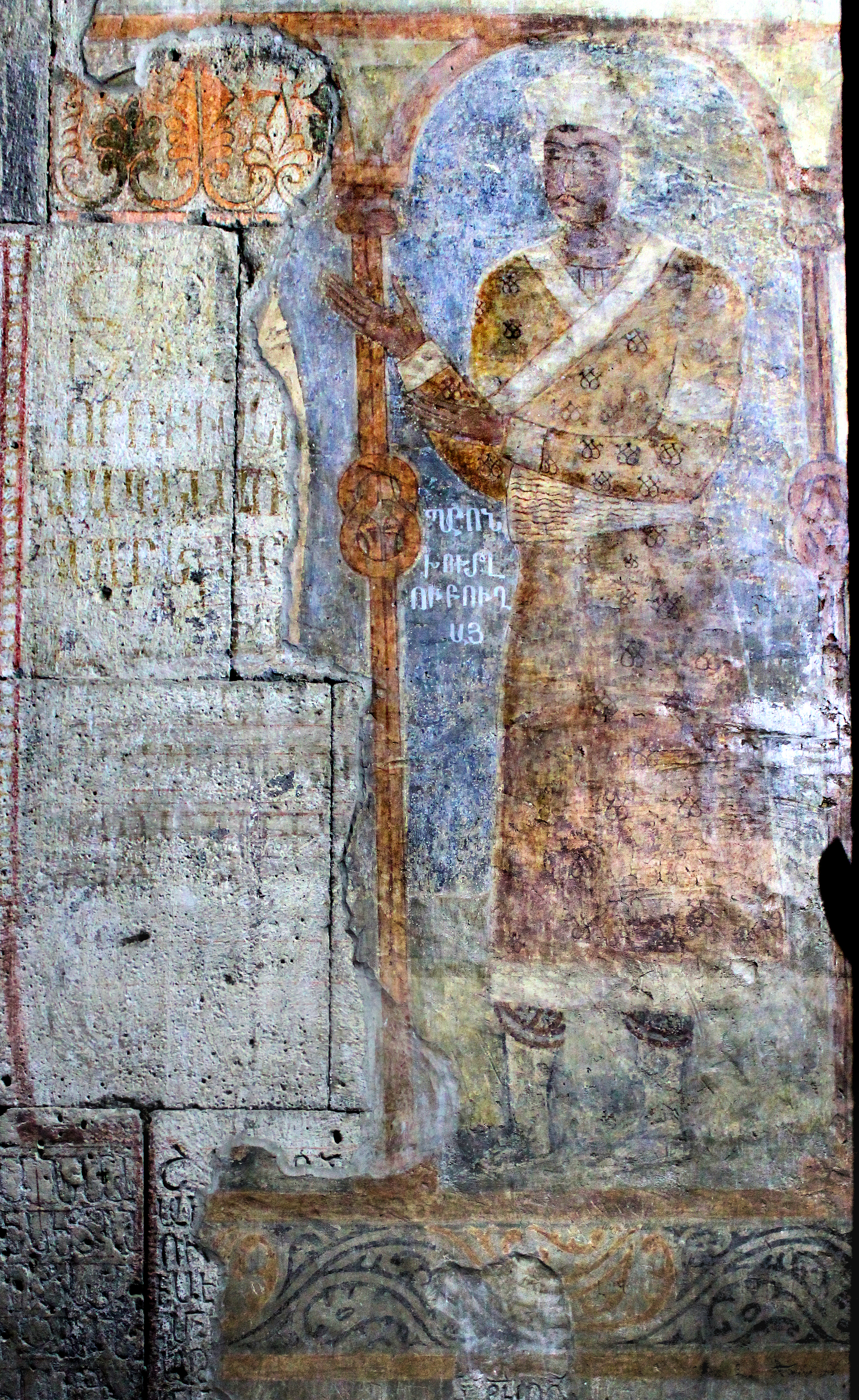
Khutlubuga. Church of the Holy Sign. Haghpat Monastery, southern wall. Late 13th century.

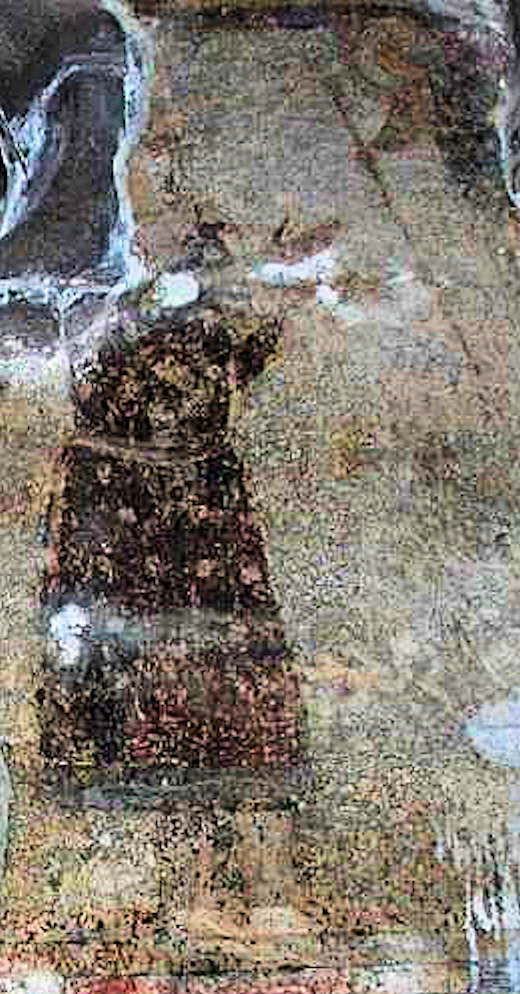
Kobayr mural (devotee). Chapel

== Sources ==
- Shoshiashvili, N., Georgian Soviet Encyclopedia, vol. 7, p. 271. Tbilisi, 1979
