= Shahnshah I Zakarian =

Shahnshah Zakarian Շահնշահ Ա Զաքարյան
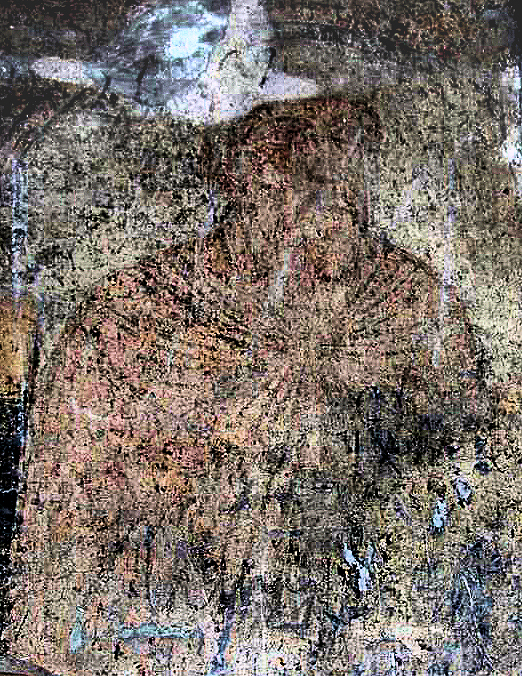
- Probable mural of Shahnshah Zakarian as a donator at Kobayr Monastery Chapel, painted in the 1270s.

Mandaturtukhutsesi
- In office 1223–1261
- Preceded by: Shalva Akhaltsikheli
- Succeeded by: Avag-Sargis III Zakarian

Personal details
- Born: 1197
- Died: 1261 (aged 63–64)
- Resting place: Kobayr monastery
- Spouse: Vaneni
- Children: Zakare III Zakarian; Avag-Sargis III Zakarian; Ivane II Zakarian
- Parent: Zakare II Zakarian (father)

Shahnshah Zakarian (Georgian: შანშე მხარგრძელი; Armenian: Շահնշահ Ա) was a member of the Armenian Zakarid dynasty, and a Court official of the Kingdom of Georgia, holding the office of Mandaturtukhutsesi (Commander-in-Chief) and Amirspasalar (Commander-in-Chief) of the Georgian army. He was the son of Zakare II Zakarian, and the father of Zakare III Zakarian, who participated to the Siege of Baghdad in 1258.

== Biography ==
Shahnshah was born in 1197, he was the son of Zakare II Zakarian. When his father died he was raised by his uncle Atabeg Ivane I Zakarian, who converted him to the Chalcedonian faith.

His baptismal name was Sargis, then Ani's title Shahnshah (Shahanshah) became his name (both Ani and this title were inherited from his father).

Shahnshah Zakarian, while Governor of Ani, was active in the construction of monasteries and church. The Church of Saint Elia, Kizkale in Ani, was dedicated in his name 1212-1213. The church of St Gregory of Tigran Honents was dedicated by an Armenian merchant under his rule, in 1215.

William of Rubruck, envoy extraordinary of King Louis IX of France to the Khan of Mongol Empire, stayed in 1255 with Shahnshah on one of his Armenian estates. Rubroek characterizes Shahnshah as a great feudal lord and owner of 15 cities.

During Mongol invasion of Georgia in 1238-39 Queen Rusudan had to evacuate Tbilisi for Kutaisi, leaving eastern Georgia in the hands of atabeg Avag Zakarian, Shahnshah Zakarian, and Kakhetian lord, Egarslan Bakurtsikheli. The Mongol general Toghta was sent by Chaghatai to assault Avag's troops at the fortress of Kayan. After some resistance, Avag surrendered, and has to agree to pay tribute to the Mongols, and to provide let his troops join the Mongol army. The combined troops went on to Ani, the Armenian capital defended by Shahnshah Zakarian, but the city was eventually captured and destroyed. Following this disastrous campaign of 1238-1239, the Armenians and Georgians made peace with the Mongols and agreed to pay them tribute and supply their troops (Georgian–Mongolian treaty of 1239).

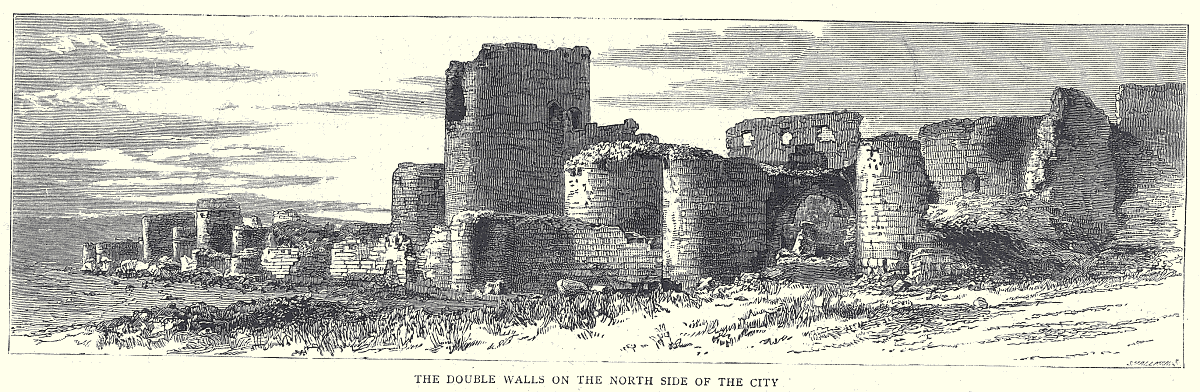
Double walls of Ani.

In 1259-1260, Shahnshah Zakarian participated to the Mongold-led Siege of Mayyafariqin, together with the Armenian Prince Prosh Khaghbakian.

In 1261, Zakare, the eldest son of Shahnshah, was executed by the Mongols, while Shahnshah was freed for a ransom. He died later that year, overcome with grief from the execution of his son, and was buried in the Kobayr Monastery.

He built the belltower and the mausoleum in the center of the monastery at Kobayr Monastery.

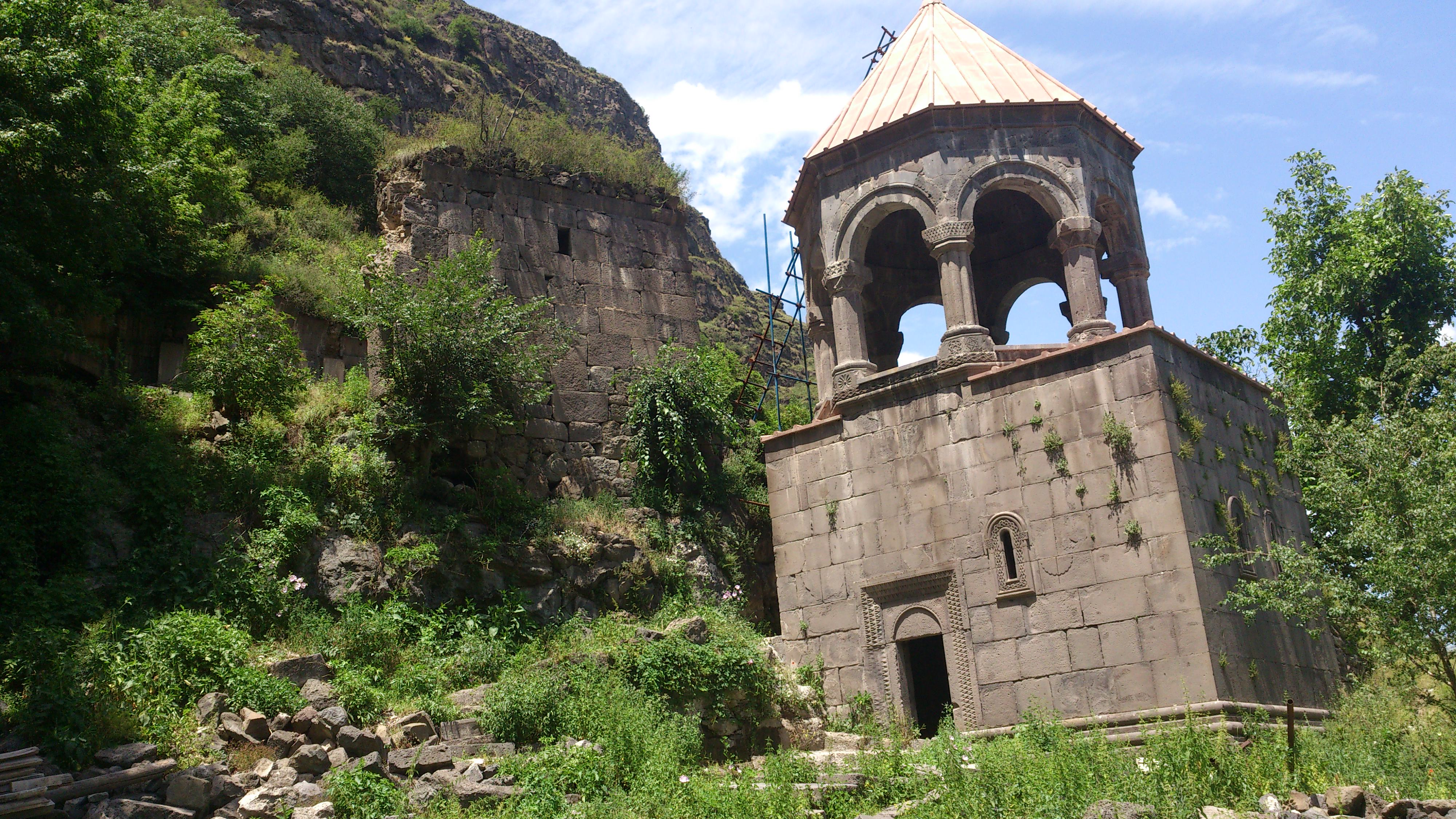
The belltower of Kobayr Monastery, where the tomb of Shahnshah Zakarian is located.

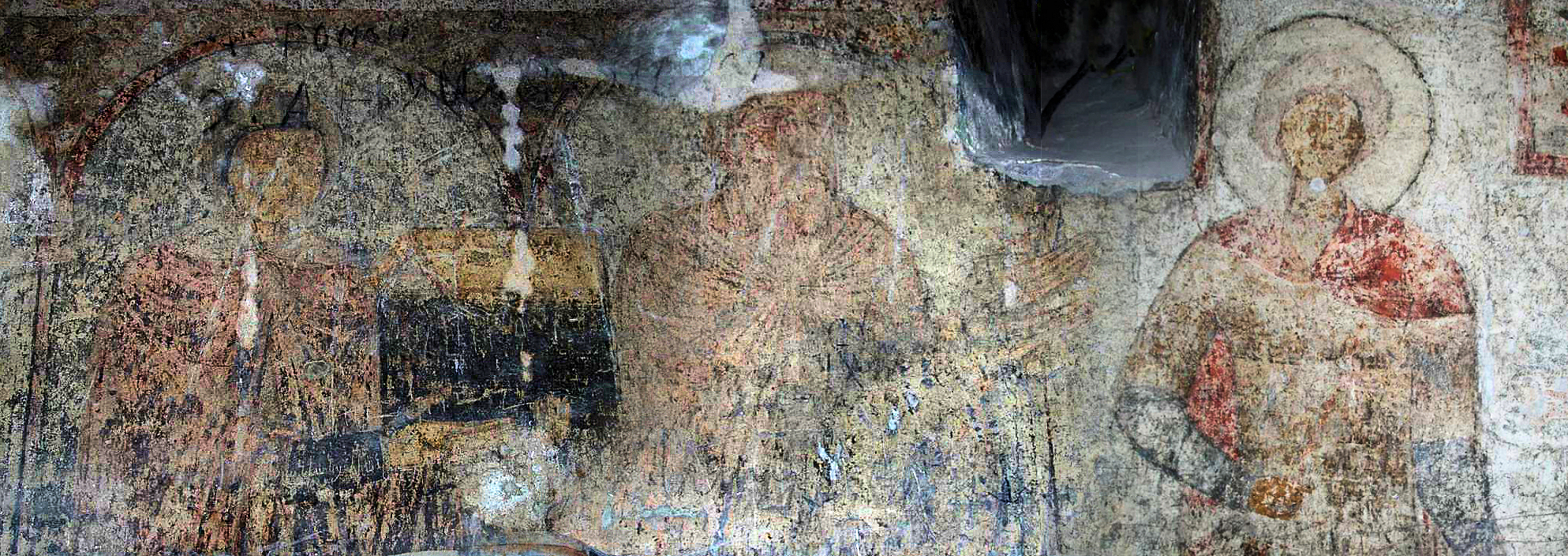
Probable mural of Shahnshah Zakarian (middle) and his wife Vaneni (left) as donators, with a kindred in military uniform (right), Kobayr monastery Chapel, or "Aisle".

== Family ==
His wife was called Vaneni. Shahnshah's children's were:

- Zakare III, Amirspasalar of Georgia;
- Ivane II, Mandaturtukhutsesi of Georgia;
- Avag-Sargis III, Mandaturtukhutsesi and Amirspasalar of Georgia;
- Artashir;
- Zakarian
- Aghbugha;
- Beri George, monk builder of Kobayr monastery.

== Bibliography ==
- Toumanoff, Cyril (1990). Les dynasties de la Caucasie chrétienne de l'Antiquité jusqu'au XIXe siècle (in French). Rome: Tables généalogiques et chronologiques.
