= Chiaber =

12th-century Georgian noble

Chiaber (Georgian: ჭიაბერი) was a Georgian noble (didebuli) from eastern Georgia in the 12th century. They were a foster son of George III of Georgia.

== Biography ==
=== Early life ===
In 1177 during the rebellion of Prince Demna and the Orbelian dynasty, Chiaber – "honest and faithful man" – supported the monarchy against the insurgents. The uprising was suppressed, and King George III elevated him to the office of Mejinibetukhutsesi (High Constable), thus becoming the second man after Amirspasalar.

=== Service under Queen Tamar ===
Following the death of George III, Queen Tamar elevated him to the office of Mandaturtukhutsesi (Interior ministry) and handed him a golden sceptre and dressed him in precious garments. Around 1190-1191 he was even granted office of Amirspasalar for a short time.

During a revolt of treasurer Qutlu Arslan and Tamar's disgraced husband, George the Rus, Chiaber was one of the few nobles who remained loyal to the Queen. For this he was kindly rewarded; he was given the town and fortress Zhinovani with many lands in the mountains. In 1195 he was participating in the Battle of Shamkor.
