= Prosh Khaghbakian =

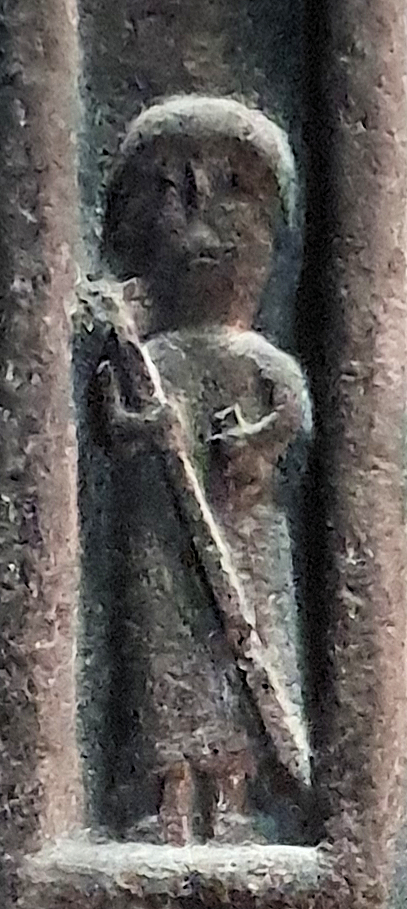
- Donator figure in the "Chapel of the Proshians", Geghard, dedicated by Prince Prosh Khaghbakian in 1283.

Proshyan dynasty
- Reign: 1223–1284
- Predecessor: Vasak
- Successor: Amir Hasan I
- Died: 1284
- Burial: Geghard Monastery
- Spouse: Khutlu Khatun
- Issue: Vasak, Amir Hasan I, Papak, Mkdem
Names
- Hasan "Prosh" Khaghbakian
- Dynasty: Proshyan dynasty
- Father: Vasak Khaghbakian

Prosh Khaghbakian (Armenian: Պռօշ Խաղբակեան, romanized: Pṙōš Xałbakean; r. 1223–1284), also known as Hasan Prosh, was an Armenian prince who was a vassal of the Zakarid princes of Armenia. He was a member of the Khaghbakian dynasty, which is also known as the Proshian dynasty after him. He was the supreme commander (sparapet) of the Zakarid army from 1223 to 1284, succeeding his father Vasak. He was one of the main Greater Armenian lords to execute the alliance between his suzerain the Georgian king David Ulu and the Mongol Prince Hulagu, during the Mongol conquest of Middle East (1258–1260).

== Background ==
Prosh was the junior son of Prince Vasak Khaghbakian and his wife Mama. He had two brothers named Papak and Mkdem. The Khaghbakians were originally a noble house in the region of Khachen. Vasak and his sons came to prominence in the Georgian-Armenian wars against the Seljuks. In 1201–1203, they received new hereditary holdings around Garni and in Vayots Dzor from the Zakarid princes of Armenia and were appointed governors of the lands "from Garni to [the fortress in Syunik] Bargushat" in return for their services. Prosh succeeded his father after his death c. 1223. His elder brother Papak had died in battle against the Kipchaks in 1222, and Mkdem seems to have predeceased his father as well, so the succession passed to Prosh.

== Warfare ==
The Mongols had received the assistance of Armenian lords since the 1230s. Numerous Georgian-Armenian military units participated in the Mongol conquest of Alamut in 1256, where they were personally led by David VII of Georgia.

In 1258, Prosh Khaghbakian led Armenian troops to accompany the Mongol siege of Baghdad, while Zakare III Zakarian was leading the Georgian troops. He is said to have led the negotiations with the Caliph of Baghdad, al-Musta'sim, but in vain. Prosh Khaghbakian was the main source for the account of the fall of Baghdad by the Armenian historian Kirakos.

In 1258–1260, Prosh, with his Armenian Zakarid suzerain Shahnshah, led a large force of Georgians and Armenians to support a much smaller force of Mongol troops of Hulagu in the Siege of Mayyafariqin, which was defended by its last Ayyubid ruler Al-Kamil Muhammad. The Armenian Prince Sevada of Khachen was killed in the conflict. When the city was captured at last after a siege of two years, the Muslims were massacred, but the Christians were spared. Christian relics were collected and brought back to Armenia, particularly to Haghpat Monastery.

Meanwhile, Hulagu continued his conquest of the rest of Syria, accompanied by the forces of Hethum I of the Armenian Kingdom of Cilicia and the Crusaders of Bohemond VI of Antioch. The Georgian ruler David VII declined to commit more Georgian-Armenian troops for these Mongol campaigns in Syria, on account that he had suffered huge losses in the 1258 Siege of Baghdad.

== Monastic patronage ==
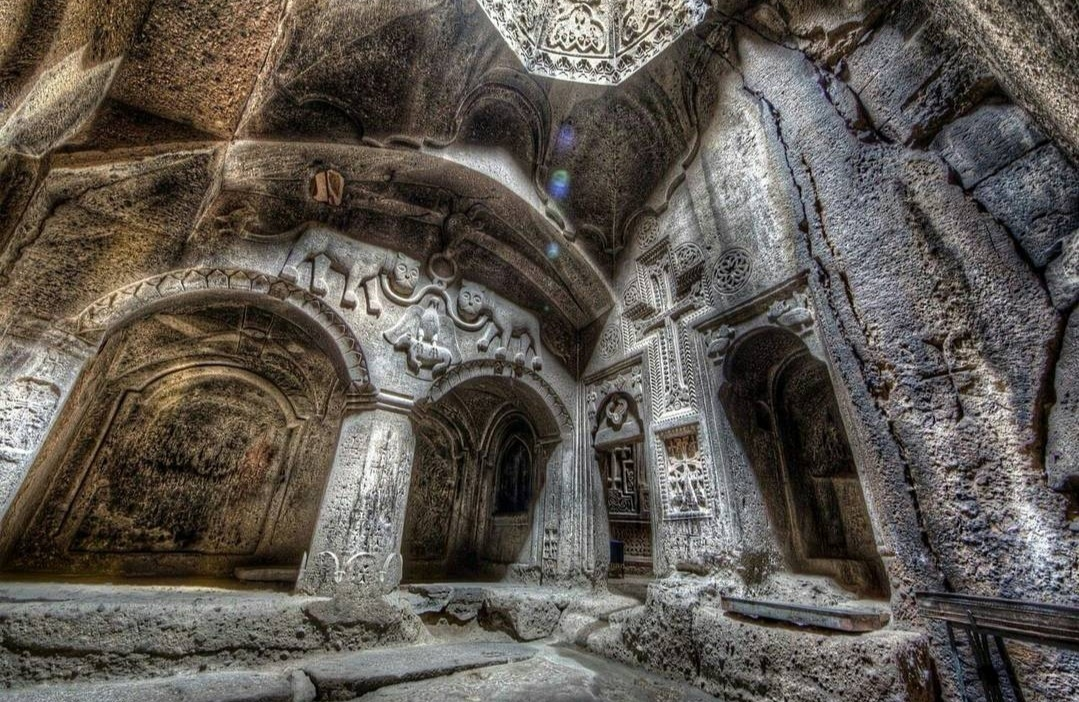
Mausoleum of Prince Prosh Khaghbakian (1283) in Geghard monastery. The tombs are behind the twin arches.

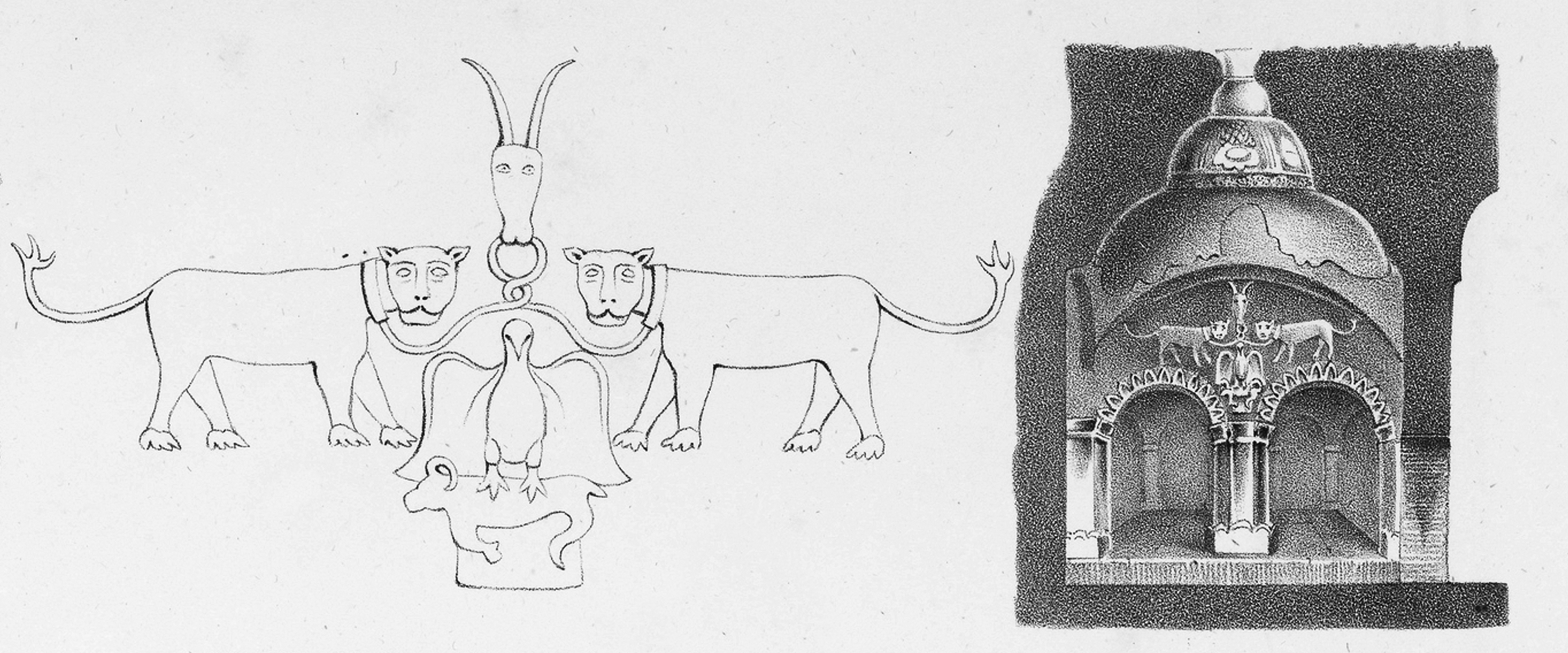
Putative arms of the Proshian family

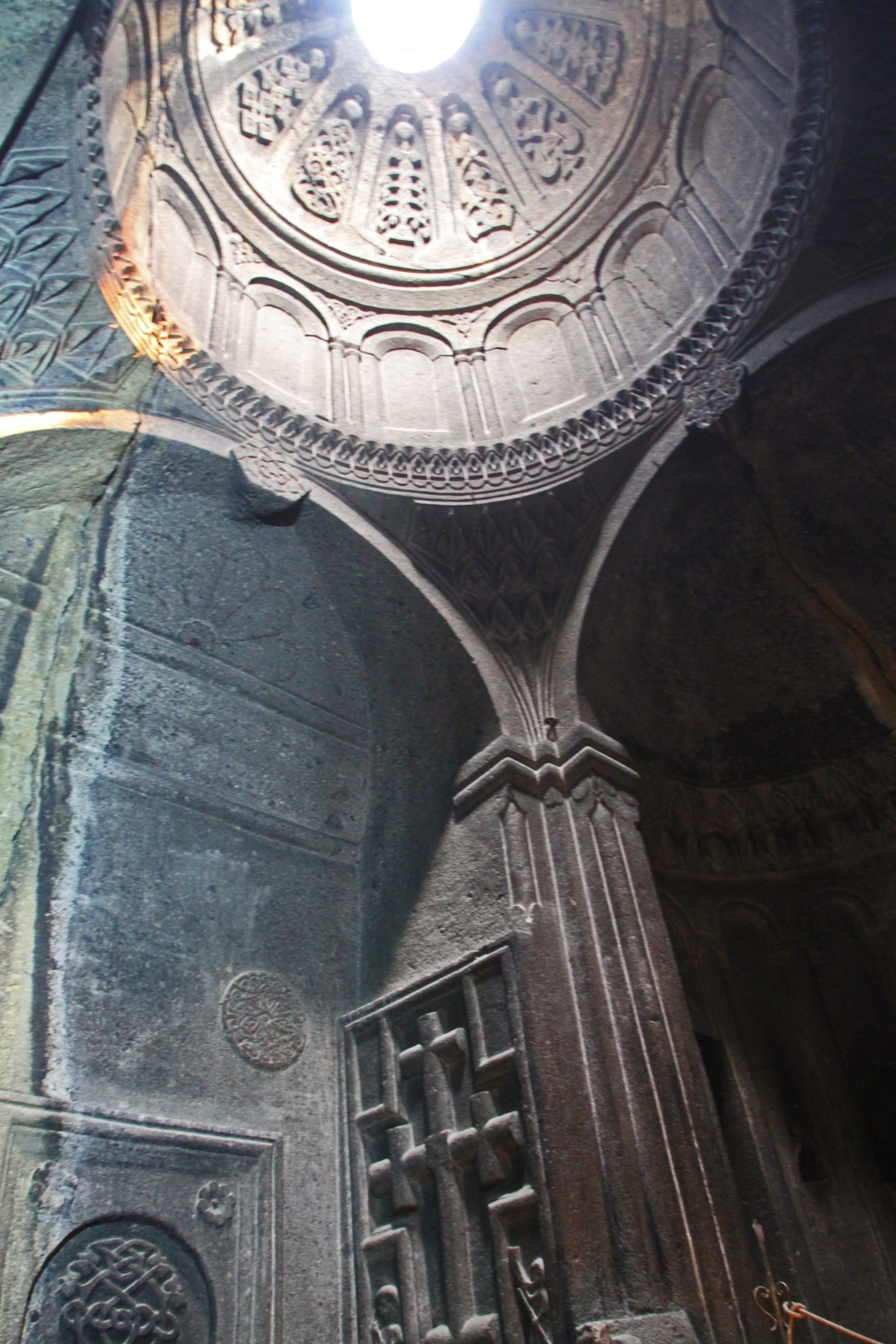
The "Chapel of the Proshians" in Geghard was dedicated by Prince Prosh in 1283.

Prosh Khaghbakian was involved in the development of the monastery of Geghard in the Kotayk province of Armenia, partially carved out of the adjacent mountain and surrounded by cliffs. He purchased the monastery in the mid-13th century from the Zakarids and built a series of additional chapels hewn into the rock. Over a short period, the Proshians built the cave structures which brought Geghard fame—the second cave church, the family sepulcher of Papak and Ruzukan in the zhamatun, a hall for gatherings and studies (collapsed in the middle of the 20th century) and numerous cells. The chamber reached from the North East of the gavit and became Prince Prosh Khaghbakian's tomb in 1284.

A reliquary with a holy spear bears a dedicatory inscription made by Prince Prosh in 1269:

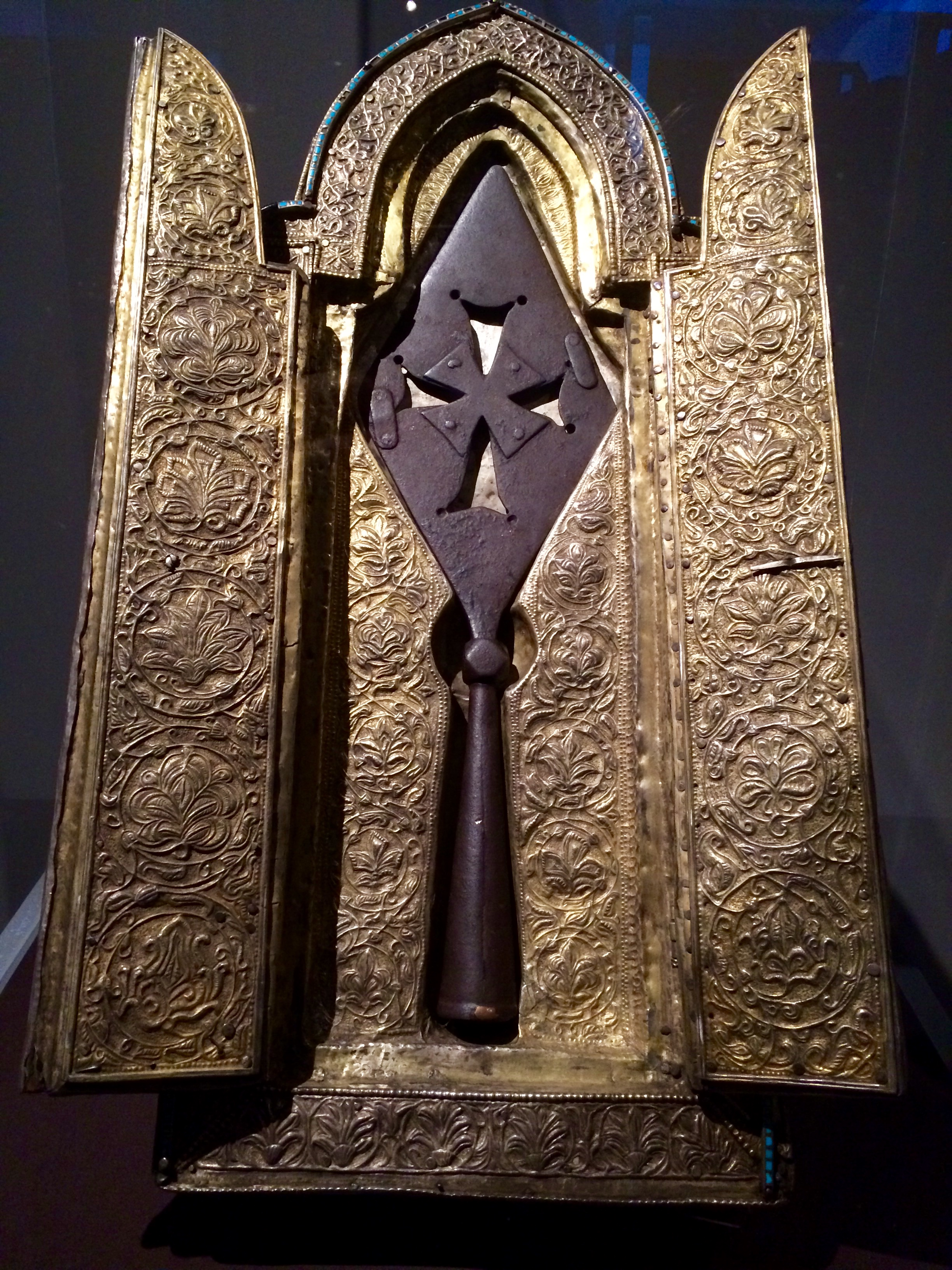

In the year 1269, I, prince Prosh, son of Vasak, inheritor of this divinely prepared holy spear, embellished it with a precious repository to have it intercede for me in the awesome judgment of Christ, and with great hope I donated it to the monastery of Ayrivank‘, the treasured place of my burial, in perpetual memory of me and my children Papak‘, Amir Hasan, and Vasak, and of my consort Dame Khutlu, who passed away in Christ, and of Mkdem and Dame Gohar, who left this world prematurely.

— Spear reliquary.

He mentions his wife in the inscription, Khutlu Khatun, as well as his children Papak Proshian (died 1298), Vasak (died c. 1268–1273), Amir Hasan I (died 1292), and Mkdem.

He was an in-law of the court official and Amirspasalar (commander-in-chief) of the Georgian army Khutlubuga.

== Sources ==
- Altınöz, Meltem Özkan (25 February 2022). Cultural Encounters and Tolerance Through Analyses of Social and Artistic Evidences: From History to the Present: From History to the Present. IGI Global. ISBN 978-1-7998-9440-7.
- Ballian, Anna (2018). "Liturgical Objects from Holy Etchmiadzin". In Evans, Helen C. (ed.). Armenia: Art, Religion, and Trade in the Middle Ages. Metropolitan Museum of Art.
- Bayarsaikhan, D. (2011). The Mongols and the Armenians (1220–1335). Leiden: Brill. ISBN 978-9-0041-8635-4.
- Bedrosian, Robert (2004). "Armenia during the Seljuk and Mongol Periods" (PDF). The Armenian People from Ancient to Modern Times. Vol. 1 (1st pbk. ed.). New York: St. Martin's Press. pp. 241–271. ISBN 978-1403964212.
- —— (1986). Kirakos Gandzakets'i's History of the Armenians. New York: Sources of the Armenian Tradition.
- Eastmond, Antony (1 January 2017). Tamta's World: The Life and Encounters of a Medieval Noblewoman from the Middle East to Mongolia. Cambridge University Press. doi:10.1017/9781316711774.014.
- Grousset, René (1970). The Empire of the Steppes: A History of Central Asia. New Brunswick, N.J.: Rutgers University Press. ISBN 978-0-8135-0627-2.
- Hairapetian, Srbouhi (1995). A History of Armenian Literature: From Ancient Times to the Nineteenth Century. Caravan Books. ISBN 978-0-88206-059-0.
- Hovsepyan, Garegin (1928). Khaghbakyankʻ kam Pṛoshyankʻ Hayotsʻ patmutʻyan mēj: patmagitakan usumnasirutʻyun [The Khaghbakians or Proshians in Armenian history: a historical study] (in Armenian). Vagharshapat: Pethrat.
- Manoukian, Agopik; Manoukian, Armen; et al., eds. (1973). G(h)eghard. Documents of Armenian Architecture (in English and Italian). Milan: Edizioni Ares.
- Mathews, Thomas F.; Sanjian, Avedis Krikor (1991). Armenian Gospel Iconography: The Tradition of the Glajor Gospel. Dumbarton Oaks. ISBN 978-0-88402-183-4.
- Neggaz, Nassima (October 2020). "The Many Deaths of the Last 'Abbāsid Caliph al-Musta'ṣim bi-llāh (d. 1258)". Journal of the Royal Asiatic Society. 30 (4): 585–612. doi:10.1017/S1356186320000267.
- Nersessian, Vrej Nerses (2017). "Two Armenian manuscripts in the Library of the Royal Asiatic Society of Great Britain and Ireland. Second Manuscript". Journal of the Royal Asiatic Society. 27 (3): 359–376. doi:10.1017/S1356186317000165. ISSN 1356-1863. JSTOR 26187361.
- Pubblici, Lorenzo (31 July 2023). "Georgia and the Caucasus". In Biran, Michal; Kim, Hodong (eds.). The Cambridge History of the Mongol Empire: Volumes I & II. Cambridge University Press. pp. 707–733. ISBN 9781316337424.
- Sicker, Martin (30 June 2000). The Islamic World in Ascendancy: From the Arab Conquests to the Siege of Vienna. Bloomsbury Publishing USA. ISBN 978-0-313-00111-6.
- Ulubabyan, B. (1978). "Khaghbakyanner". In Simonyan, Abel (ed.). Haykakan sovetakan hanragitaran [Armenian Soviet Encyclopedia] (in Armenian). Vol. 4. Yerevan: Main editorial office of the Armenian Encyclopedia. pp. 714–715.
- "UNESCO grants Monastery of Geghard status of Enhanced protection". Armenpress. 7 December 2018.
- Uzelac, Aleksandar (2015). Pod senkom psa: Tatari i južnoslovenske zemlje u drugoj polovini XIII veka [Under the shadow of the dog: Tatars and the South Slavic lands in the second half of the thirteenth century] (in Serbian). Belgrade: Utopija. ISBN 9788662890504.
- "WHC Nomination Documentation: The Monastery of Geghard and the Upper Azat Valley" (PDF). UNESCO World Heritage Convention. 2 December 2000.
