= Kobayr =

Kobayr Քոբայր
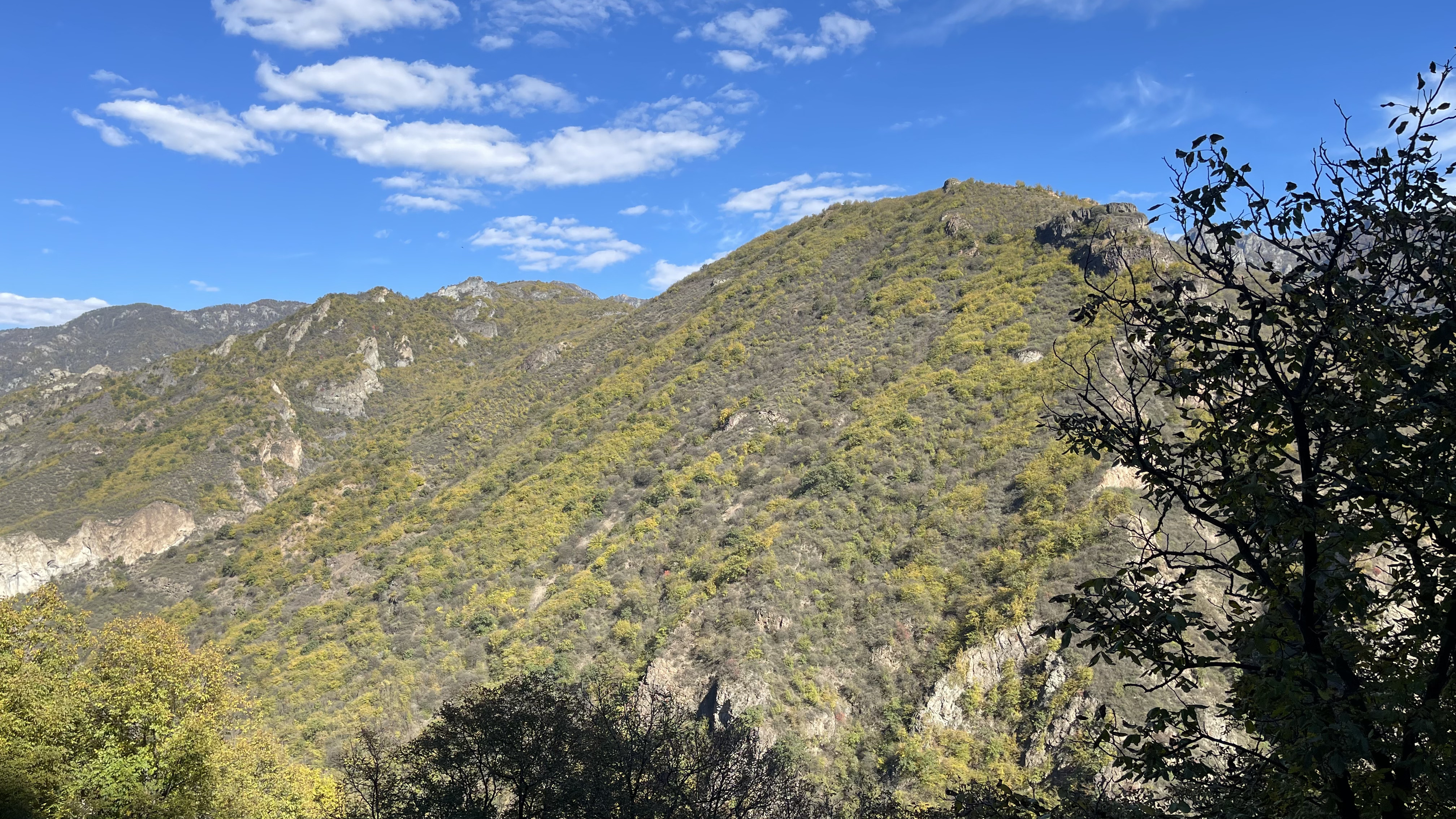

- Location within Armenia
- Coordinates: 41°00′21″N 44°38′12″E
- Country: Armenia
- Province: Lori
- Municipality: Tumanyan

Population (2022)
  - Total: 15
- Time zone: UTC+4

Kobayr (Armenian: Քոբայր), previously known as Kober kayarani gyugh (Քոբեր կայարանի գյուղ), is a village in the Tumanyan Municipality of the Lori Province of Armenia. Kobayr Monastery is near the village.

== Demographics ==
The village had a de jure population of 45 in 2011 and 15 on 1 January 2022.
