= Ivane II Zakarian =

Ivane II Zakarian Ավագ Բ Զաքարյան
- Noble family: Mkhargrdzeli
- Father: Shanshe Mkhargrdzeli

Ivane II Zakarian or Ivane II Mkhargrdzeli (Georgian: ივანე II მხარგრძელი; Armenian: Ավագ Բ Զաքարյան) was a 13th-century member of the Armenian Zakarid dynasty, and a Court official of the Kingdom of Georgia, holding the office of mandaturtukhutsesi (Mandator) of Georgia.

== Biography ==
In 1260, David VII Ulu rebelled against its Mongol overlord. Some of the nobles supported him, while most of them (Ivane Mkhargrdzeli, Grigol Surameli, Kakha Toreli etc.) went to the Khan. In 1262, David VII had to make peace with the Mongols and returned to Tbilisi, effectively splitting the country into two parts. After death of David, Georgian nobles took son of the King, Demetrius II and they came to Ivane, who went with them to the Ilkhanate around 1271-1272, to attend coronation of Demetrius. In 1288, Ivane fought campaign against Arghun Khan alongside Demetrius II.

== Sources ==
- Shoshiashvili, N., Georgian Soviet Encyclopedia, vol. 7, p. 271. Tbilisi, 1984
