= Ivane III Abuletisdze =

Atabeg and Amirspasalar of Georgia
- In office 1260–1272
- Preceded by: Zakaria III Mkhargrdzeli
- Succeeded by: Sadun Artsruni

Personal details
- Died: 1272

Ivane III Abuletisdze was a Georgian feudal lord of the Abuletisdze family. He was Amirspasalar of Georgia from 1260 to 1272.
