= Theodore II of Georgia =

12th century head of Georgian Orthodox Church

Theodore II (Tevdore) (Georgian: თეოდორე II) was Catholicos-Patriarch of All Georgia, from 1187 to 1204. During a revolt of treasurer Qutlu Arslan and Tamar's disgraced husband, Yuri, around 1191, Theodore remained loyal to the Queen. He, along with Anton Kutateli, the Archbishop of Kutaisi was sent to make peace with the rebels, but was unsuccessful. The chronicler of Tamar describes how Tamar and Catholicos-Patriarch accompanied Georgian army, as far as the cave-monastery at Vardzia, and stayed there to pray for their victory before an icon of the Holy Theotokos as the army marched toward Basiani. His tenure is marked by enlargement of several monasteries, such as Shio-Mgvie and Gelati.

== Sources ==
- B. Lominadze, Georgian Soviet Encyclopedia, IV, p. 652, Tbilisi, 1979

Dmitri Gamq’relidze, "The History and Eulogy of Monarchs"
