= Spaspet =

Spaspet (Georgian: სპასპეტი) was a feudal office in Georgia that originated in ancient Iberia. It is usually translated in English as High Constable.

The institution of spaspet, like its rough equivalent sparapet in neighboring Armenia, was designed under the influence of the Sassanian Persian spahbed, but differed in that it was a non-hereditary rank and included not only military, but also civil functions.

According to the medieval Georgian chronicles, the rank of spaspet was introduced by the first king P’arnavaz in the 3rd century BC. At the same time, it served as ex officio duke of Inner Iberia (Shida Kartli), around Mtskheta and Uplis-Tsikhe. It seems that this office was in fact occupied by the member of the Iberian royal family or an especially high dignitary next in seniority to the king. The Roman geographer Strabo (63/4 BC-AD 24) attests that in the royal hierarchy of Iberia "the second in line administers justice and commands the army." It is also possible to equate these dignitaries with the Iberian viceroys (pitiakhsh) whose hereditary necropolis was uncovered in Armazi.

The office, in a variously modified manner, survived into medieval and early modern Georgia down to the Russian annexation early in the 19th century.

== See also ==
- Amirspasalar
