= Kobayr monastery =

Monastery

Kobayr monastery Քոբայր
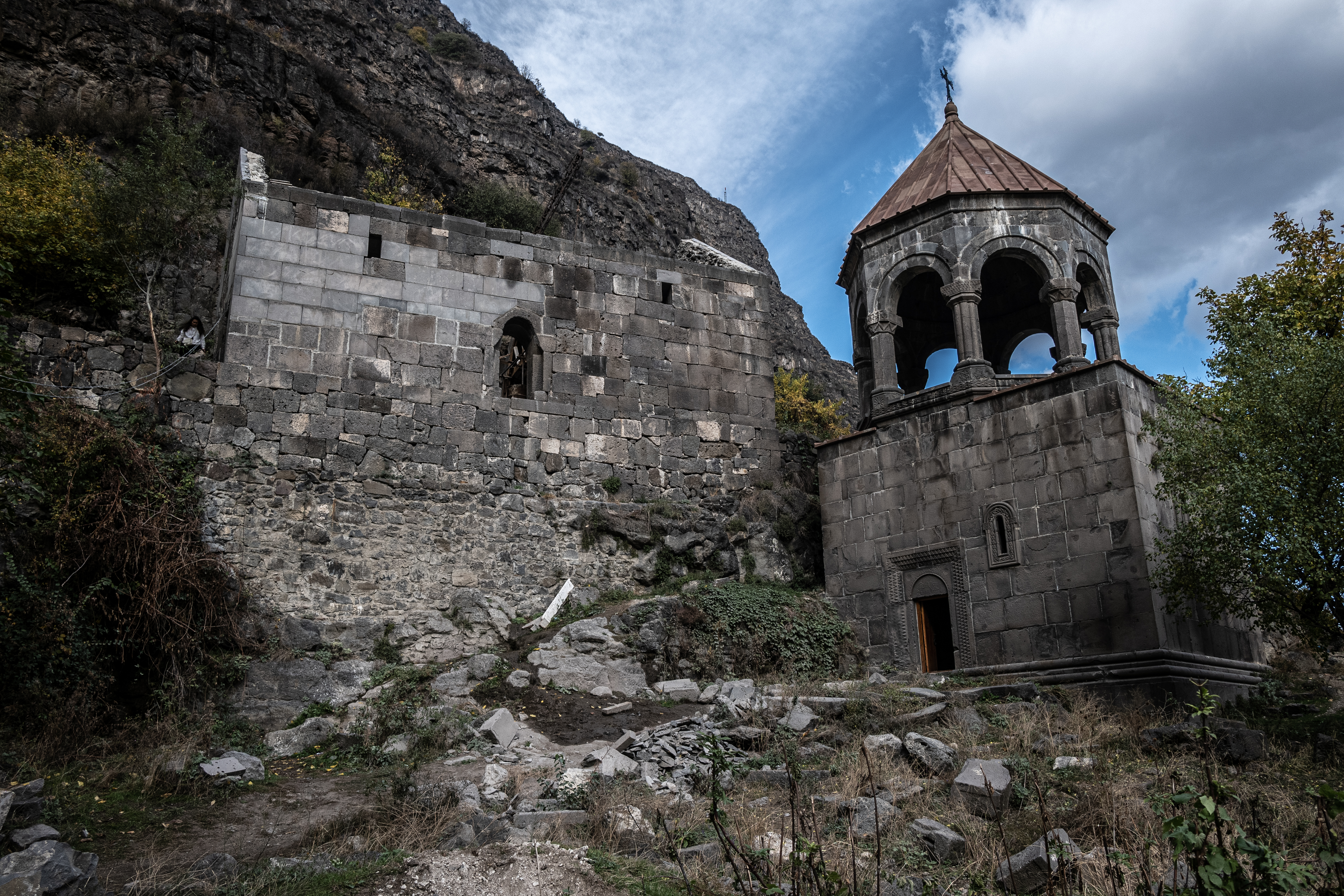

- Location within Armenia

Religion
- Affiliation: Armenian Apostolic Church

Location
- Location: near Tumanyan, Lori Province, Armenia
- Coordinates: 41.005061°N 44.635086°E

Architecture
- Style: Armenian
- Completed: 1171

Kobayr (Armenian: Քոբայր) is a 12th-century Armenian monastery located in the village Kobayr, directly across the road from the town of Tumanyan, within Lori marz, Armenia.

== History ==
The monastery was built on a brink of a deep gorge, in 1171, by the Kyurikid princes, a junior branch of the Bagratuni royal house of Armenia.

Kobayr was one of the famous spiritual, cultural and literary centers of Northern Armenia in the developed Middle Ages.

In the 1270s, the monastery was acquired by the Zakarians, a noble Armenian dynasty at the service of Georgian royals. The Zakarians converted Kobayr into a Chalcedonian monastery, as a result of which the monastery stayed under the tutelage of the Georgian Orthodox Church for some time. This explains several Georgian inscriptions found on the walls of the monastery, which exist alongside the monastery's original Armenian inscriptions. The monastery houses the tomb of Prince Shanshe Zakarian, son of Zakare II Zakarian. A bell tower in the middle of the complex was built in 1279 to house the tombs of Zakarian and his wife Vaneni. The monastery is currently undergoing renovation funded by the government of Armenia with the assistance of the government of Italy. The ruins of the main church in the monastery contain frescoes of Christ and the twelve apostles as well as the Church Fathers and other Christian figures.

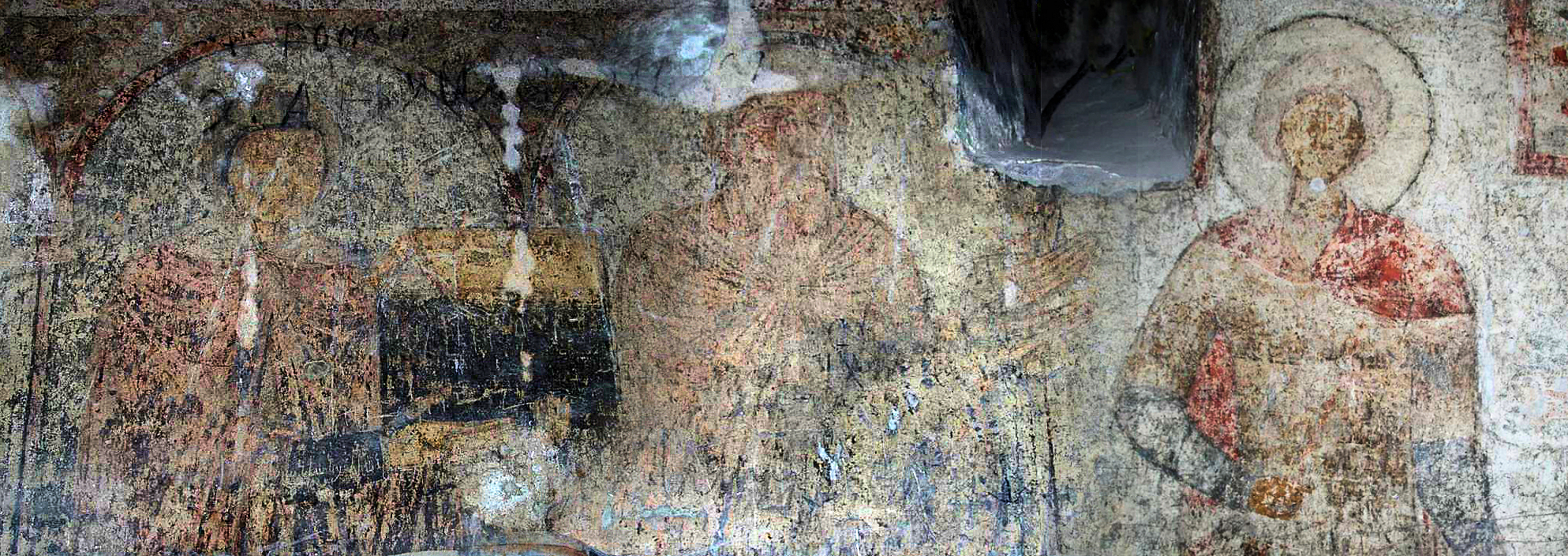
Probable depictions of Shahnshah's wife Vaneni (left), her husband Shahnshah Zakarian (middle), and a kindred in military uniform (right), as donators at the Kobayr Monastery Chapel-Aisle.

== Mural paintings ==
Mural paintings, which previously likely covered all the inside walls of the monastery, now only remain in the Big Church and the Chapel/Aisle adjoining it from the north. The style is mainly Byzantine of the 11th century CE. Inscriptions indicate that the building was consecrated in 1282, by the monk George who was the son of Shahnshah, of the Zakarian family.

The family members of the Zakarian family, including Zakare, Ivane, Shahnshah or Khutlubuga, are thought to have been depicted in the murals of the Haghpat Monastery, and inside the arches at the Kobayr Monastery (1282). Khutlubuga in particular is directly attested through an inscription and a relatively well preserved mural, reinforcing the suggestion that other close members of the dynasty were also depicted with him.

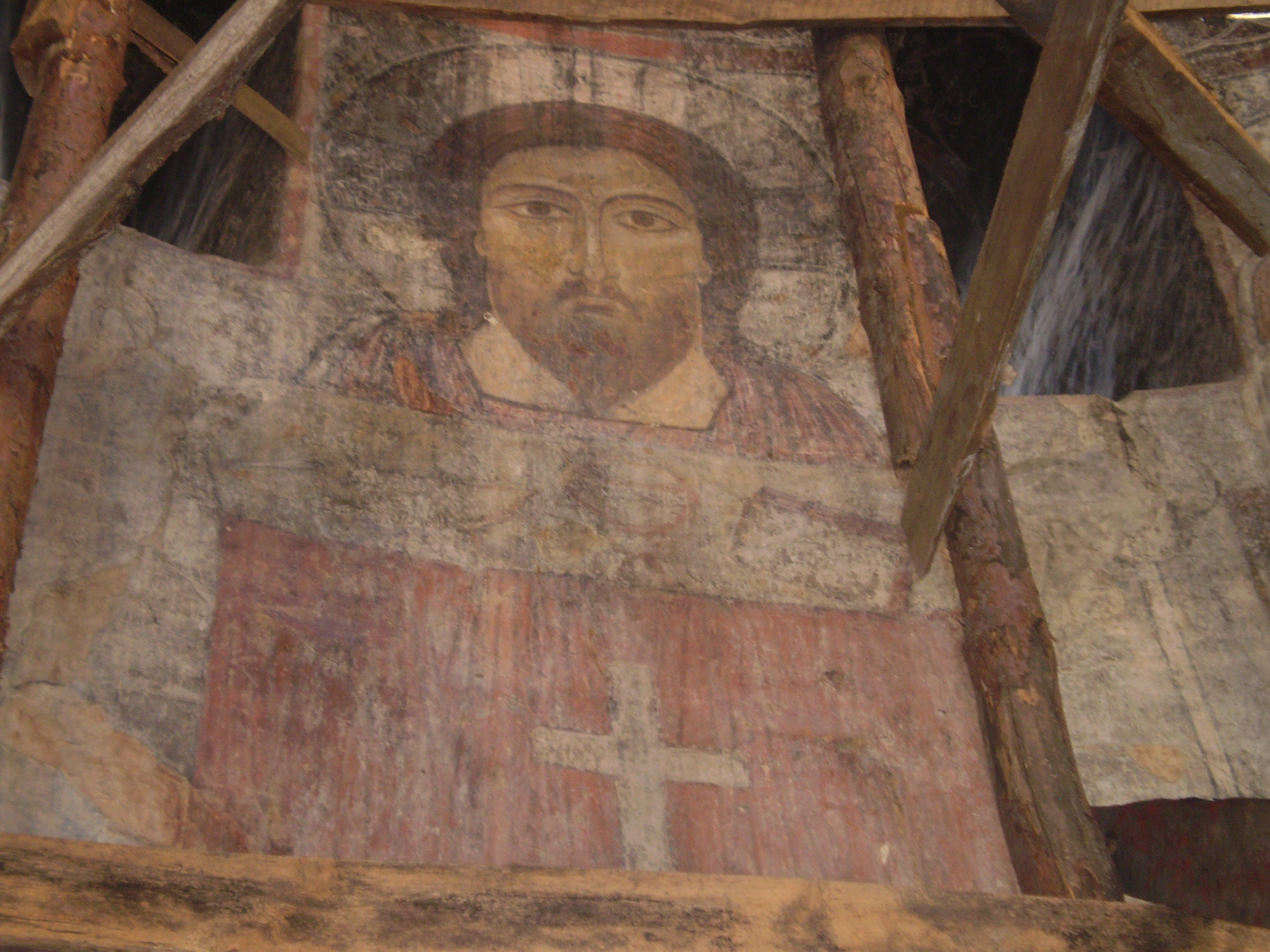
Christ depicted in fresco. Church

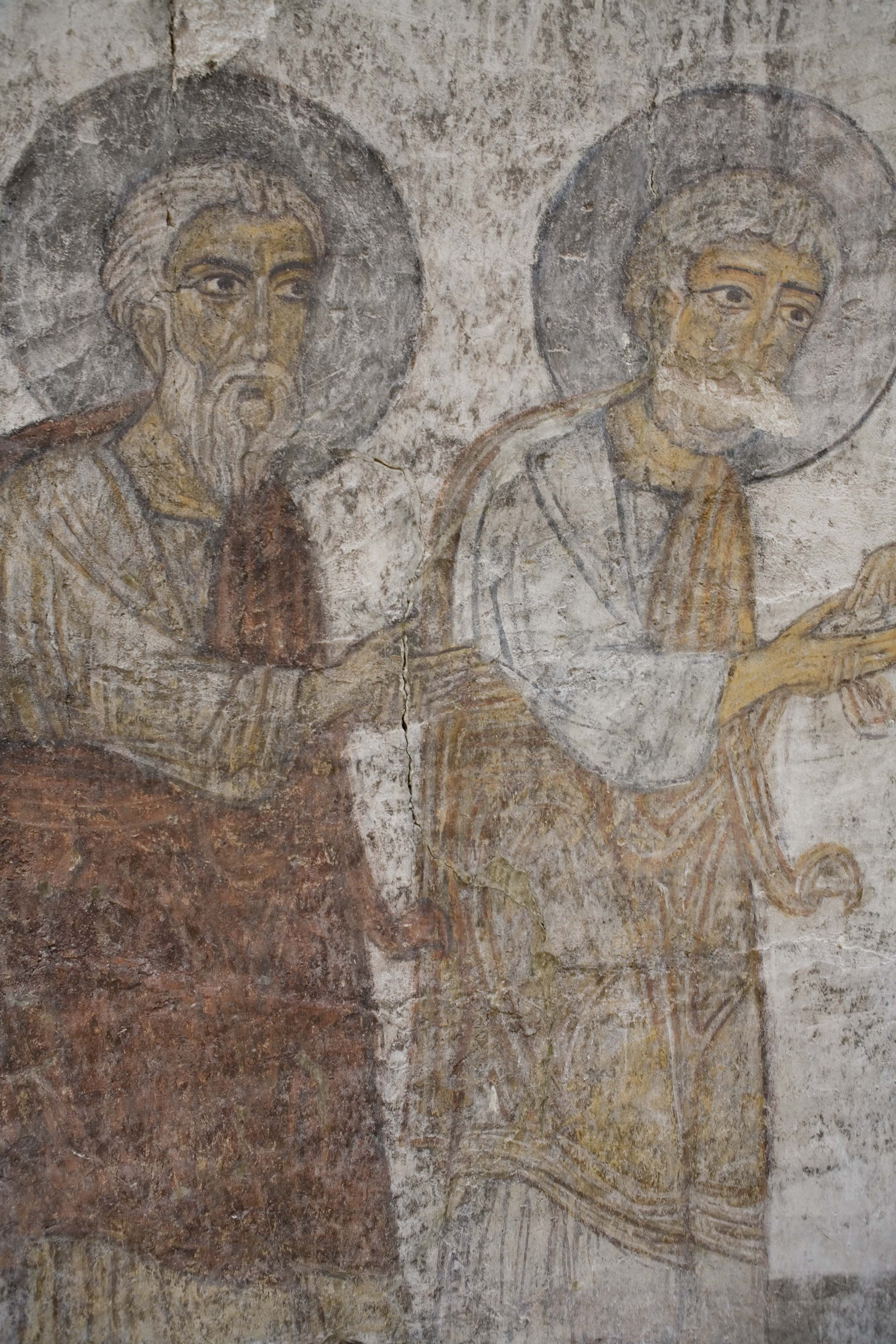
Frescoes of Saints. Church

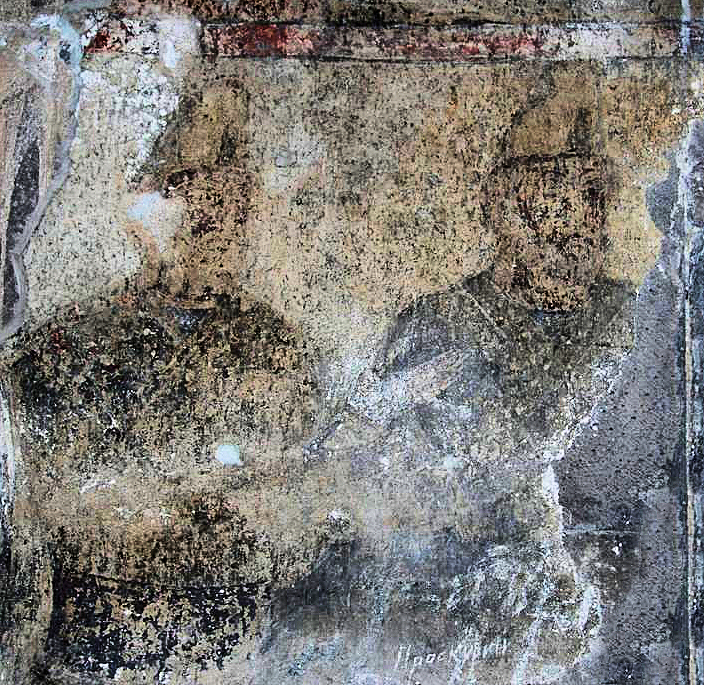
Kobayr fresco (men in uniform), Chapel

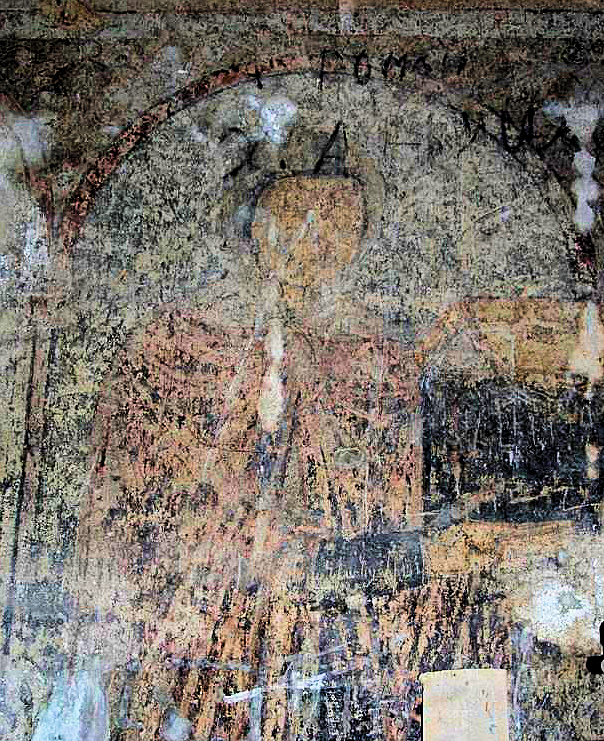
Fresco at Kobayr Monastery, painted in the 1270s. Chapel.

== Gallery ==
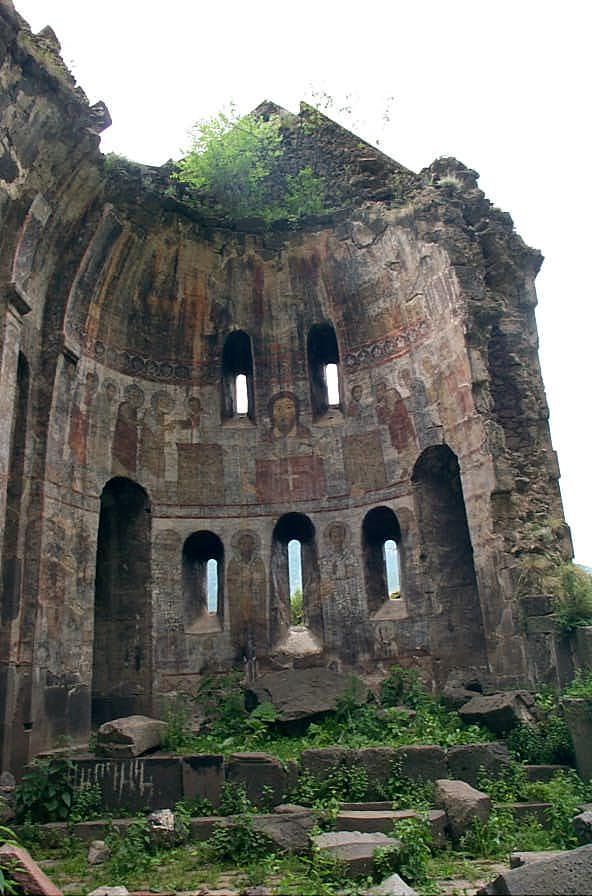
Church frescoes before reconstruction.

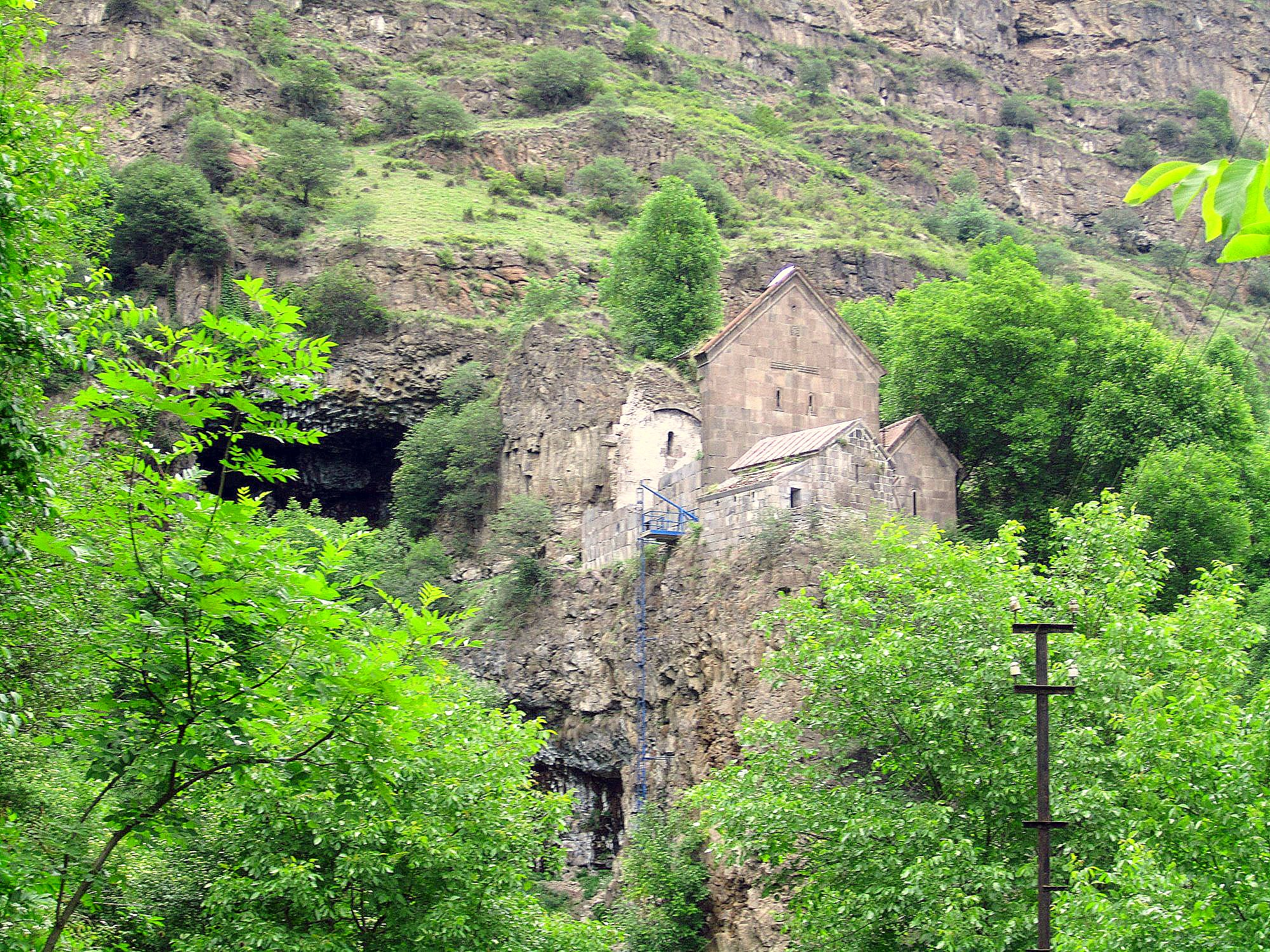
View of monastery from direction of Tumanayan

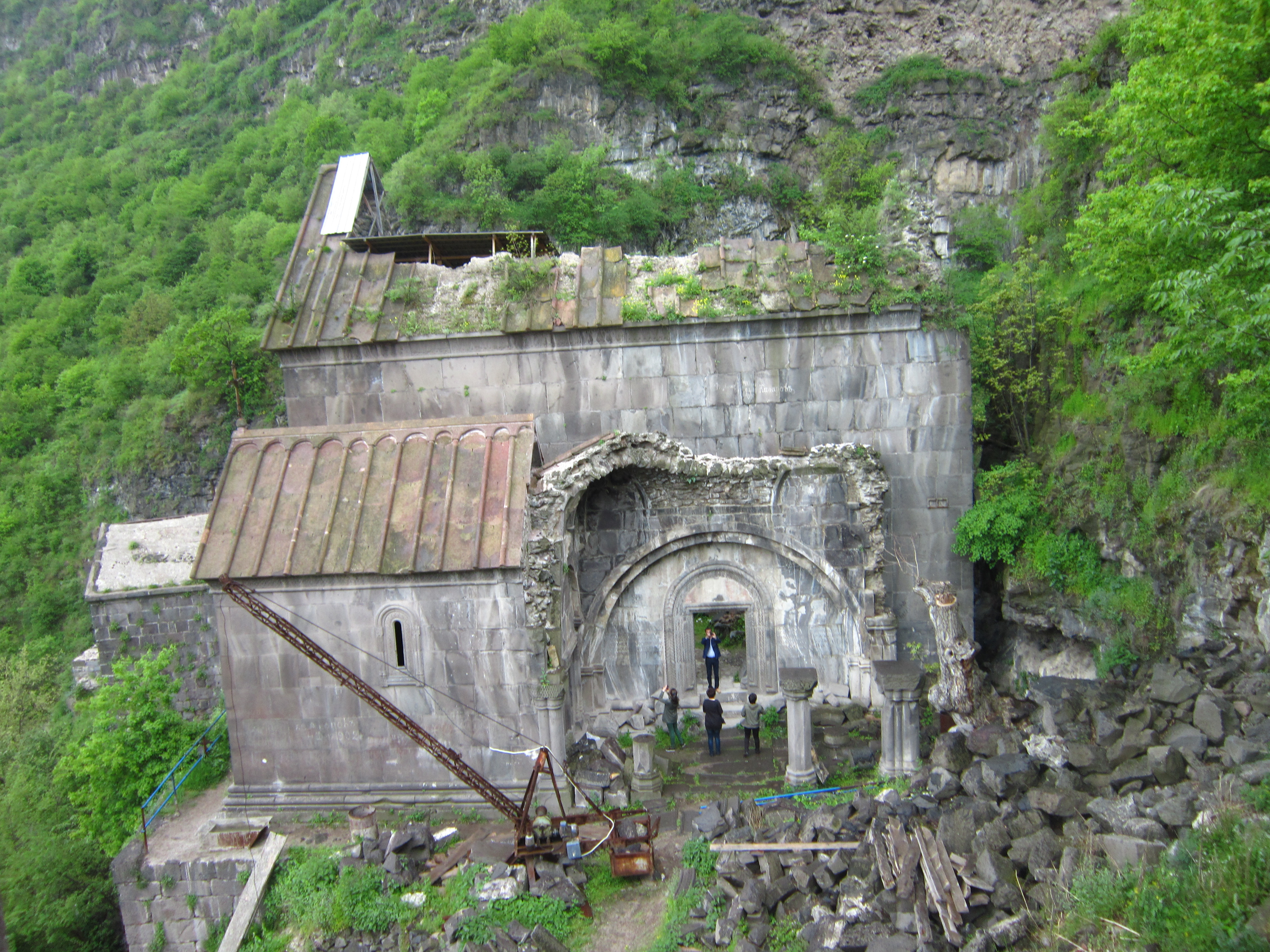
View of the Chapel from the belltower

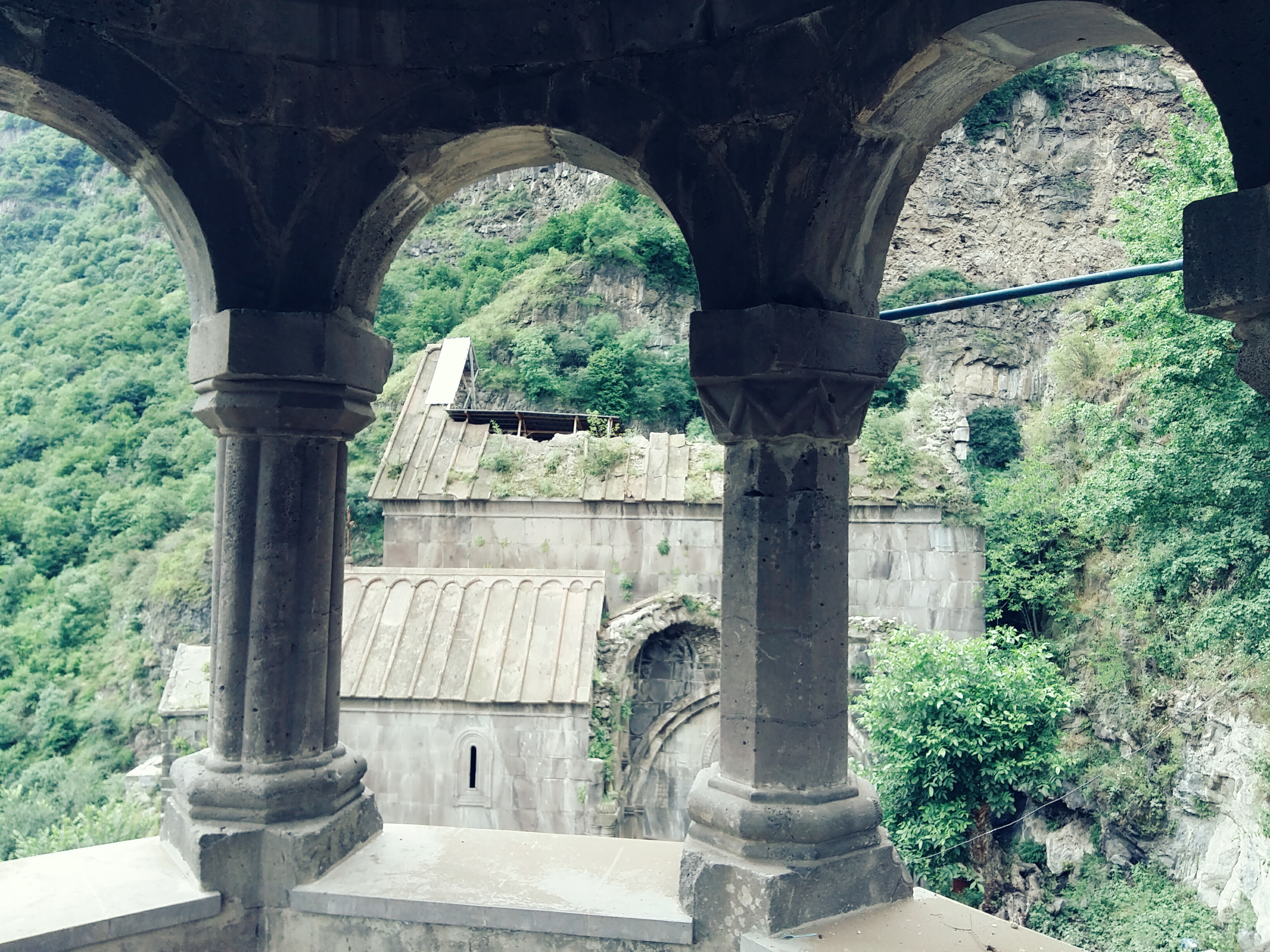
View of remainder of complex from belltower

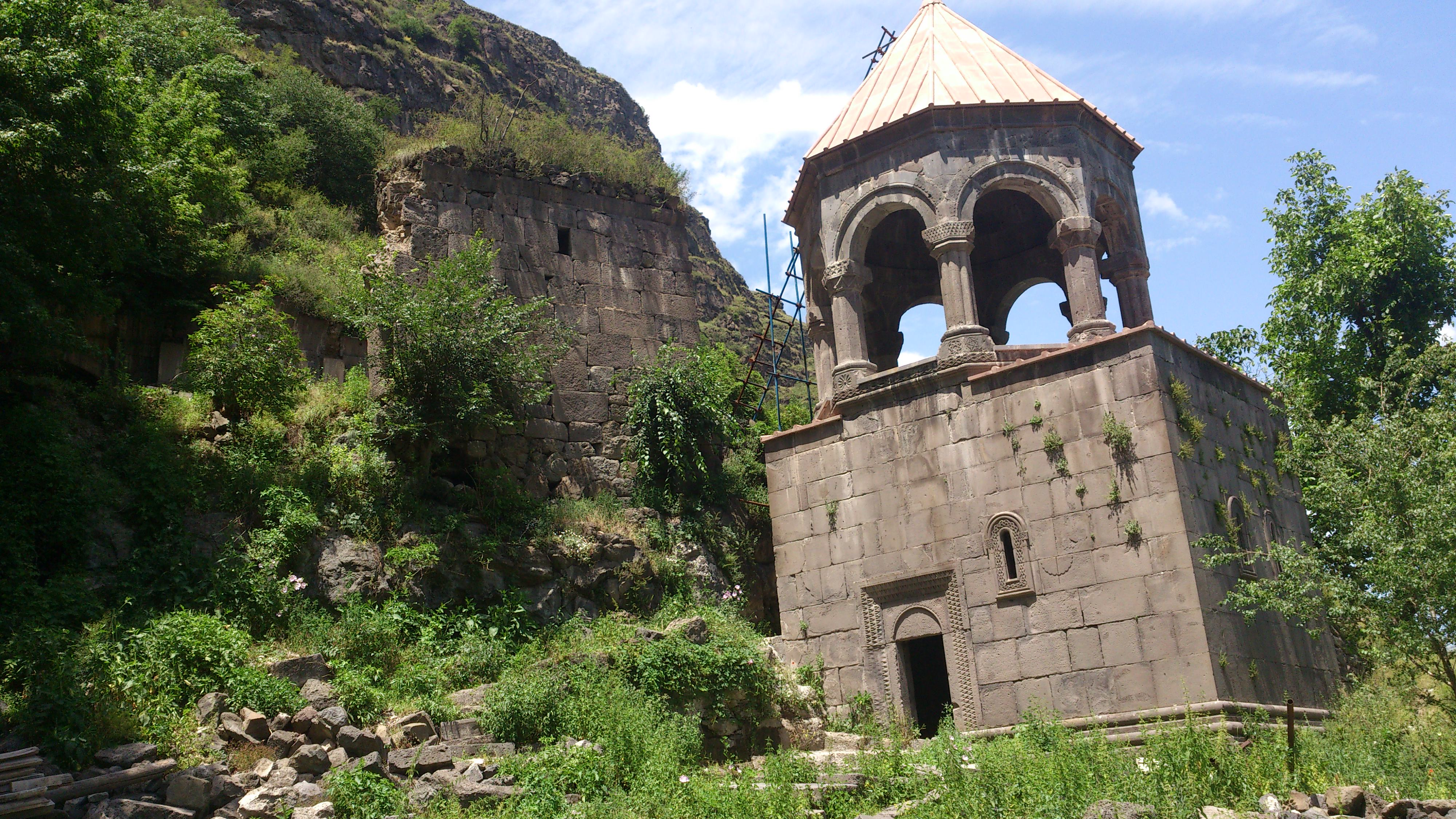
Belltower, tomb of Shahnshah Zakarian

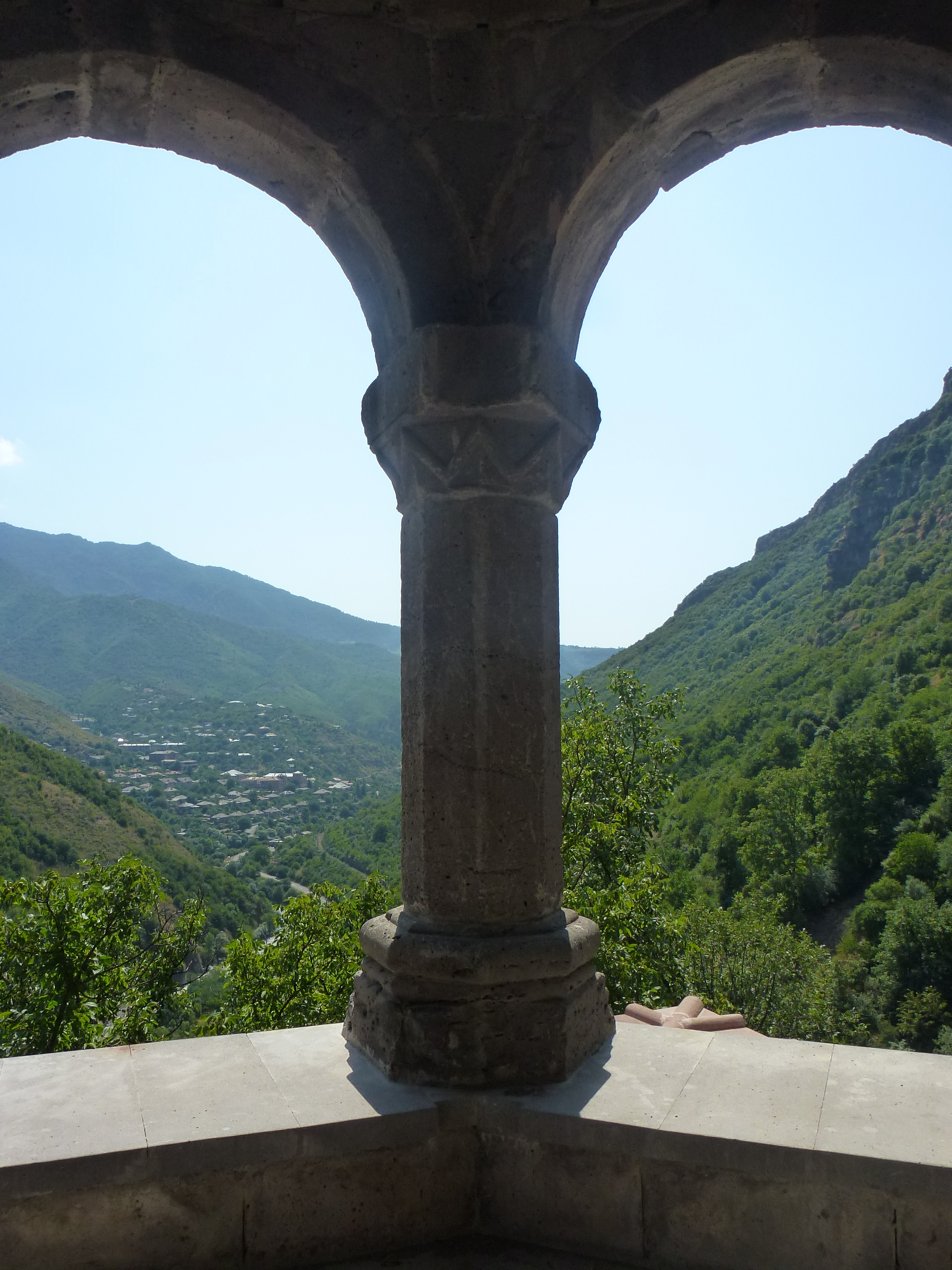
View of Tumanayan from belltower

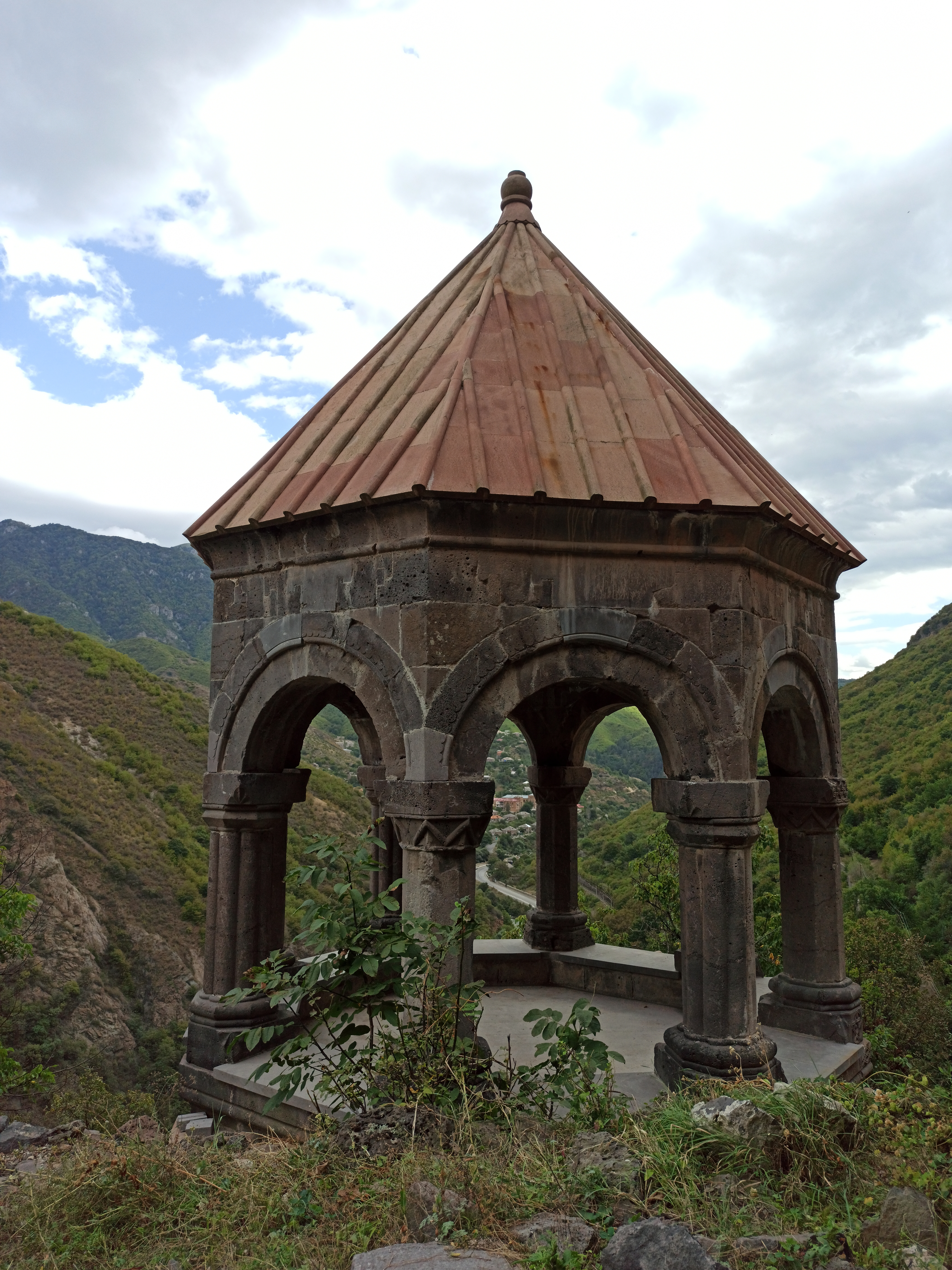
View of belltower - Tumanyan in background

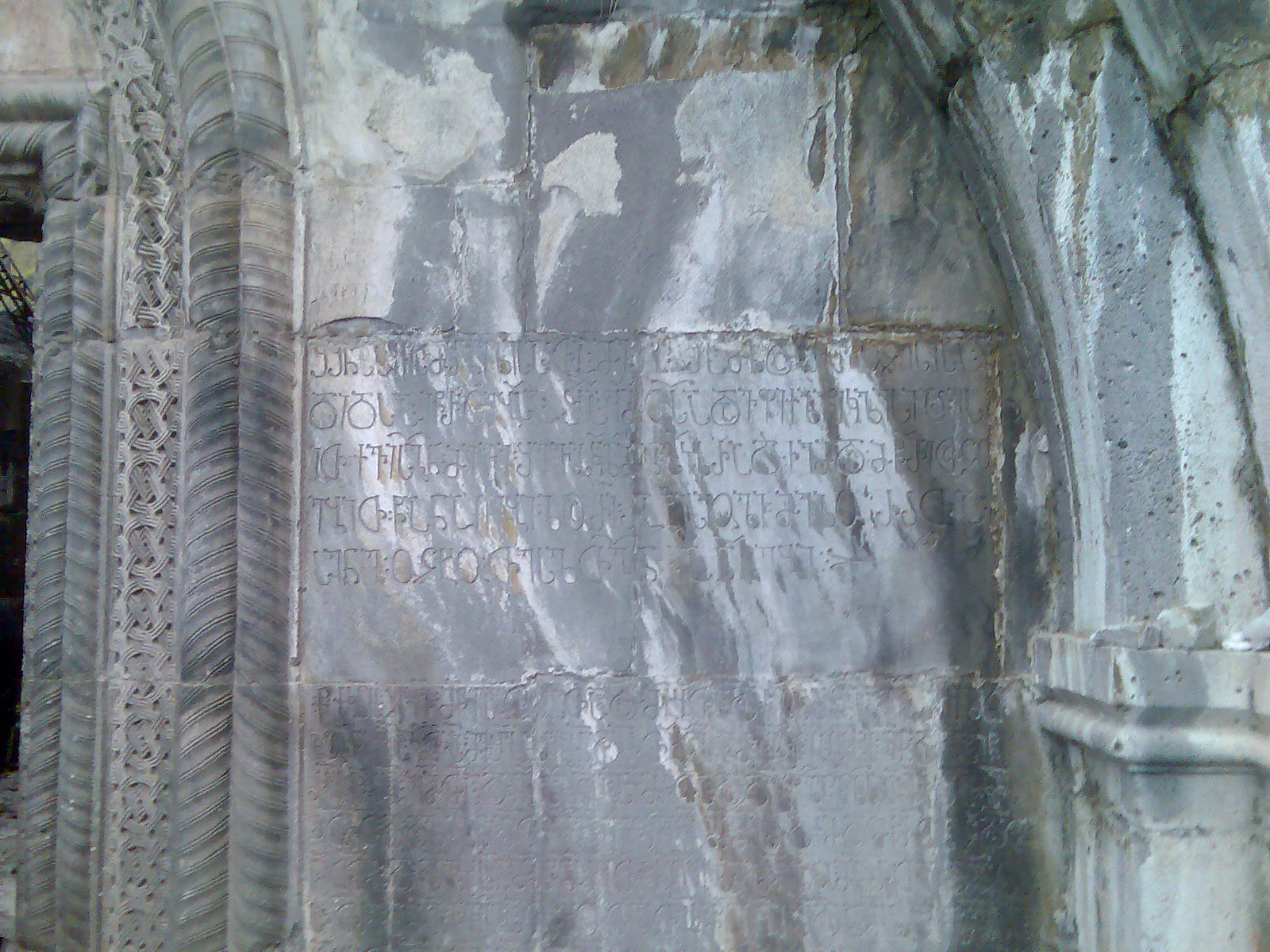
Georgian inscriptions

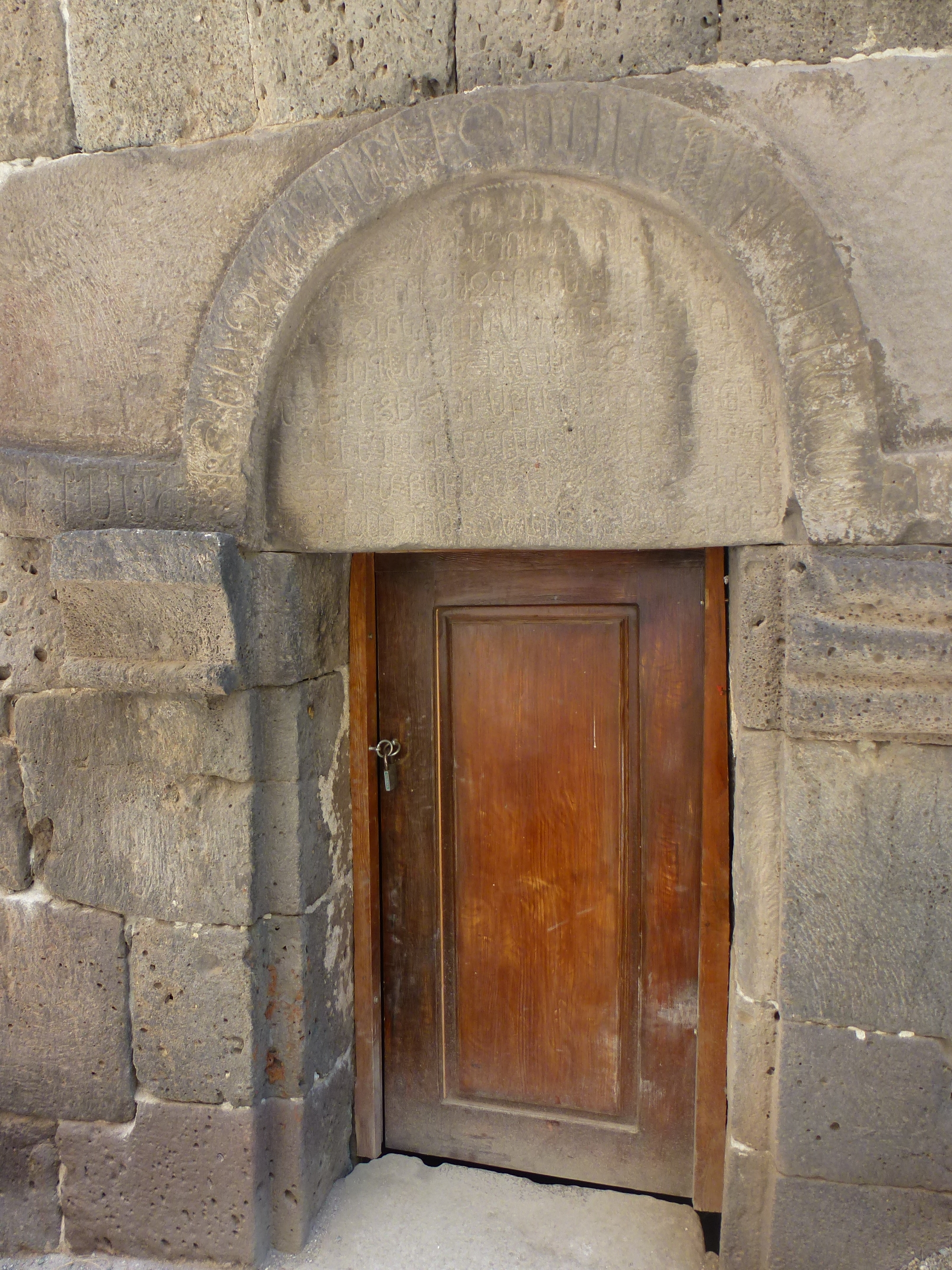
Armenian inscriptions
