= Kayan, Armenia =

Kayan Կայան
- Location within Armenia Location within Tavush
- Coordinates: 40°59′N 45°14′E
- Country: Armenia
- Province: Tavush
- Municipality: Ijevan

Population (2011)
  - Total: 309
- Time zone: UTC+4 (AMT)

Kayan (Armenian: Կայան) is a village in the Ijevan Municipality of the Tavush Province of northeast Armenia. It belongs to the community of Aygehovit. It is approximately one kilometer east from Armenia's border with Azerbaijan.
