= Mandaturtukhutsesi =

Mandaturtukhutsesi (Georgian: მანდატურთუხუცესი) was the Chief overseer of the court, in charge of the palace guard and matters of protocol. The "Mandaturtukhutsesi" was aided by an "Amirejibi" and a "Mandatur" and as a symbol of his office, he carried an "Arghani" (sceptre) presented by the monarch.

== See also ==
- Court officials of the Kingdom of Georgia
