= Amirspasalar =

Medieval-era commander-in-chief of the Georgian army

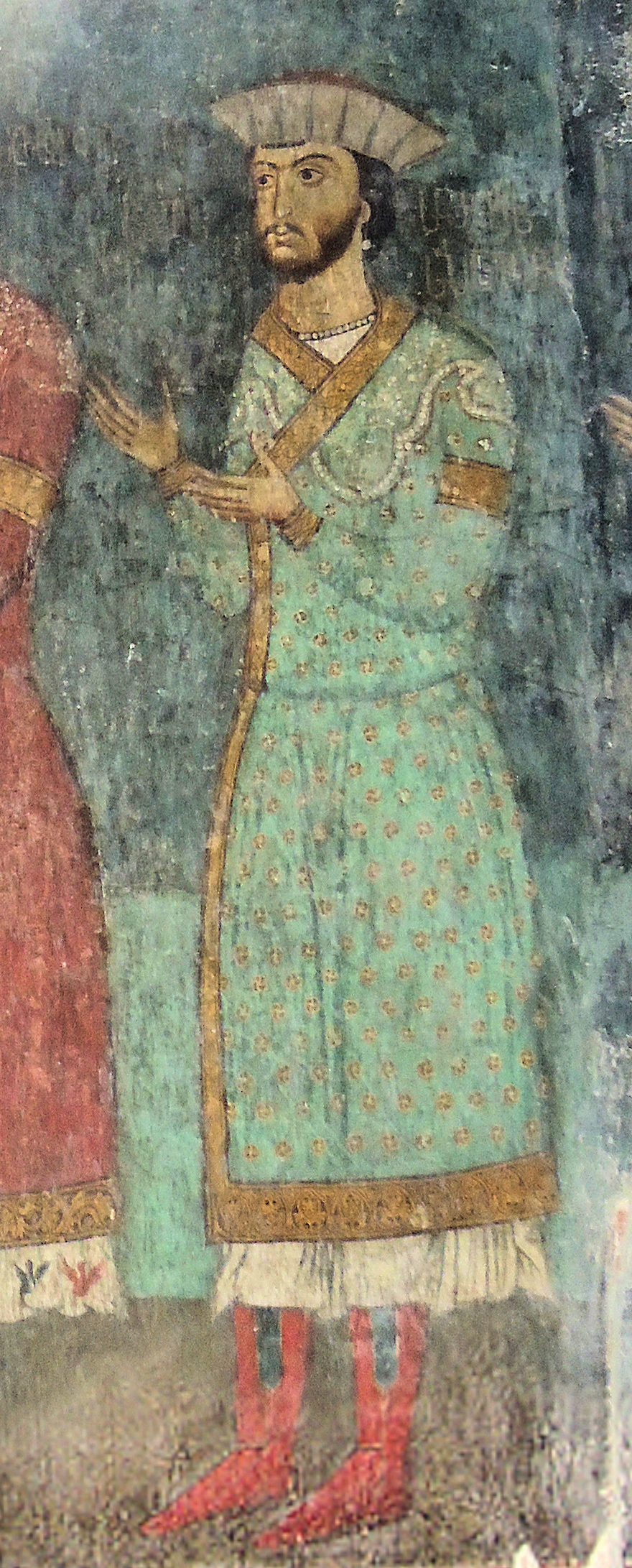
Sargis Jaqeli was appointed Amirspasalar during the reign of George V. Fresco from the Sapara Monastery.

Amirspasalar (Georgian: ამირსპასალარი, romanized: amirsp'asalari) (Note: The term is derived from amir, an Arabic title meaning 'commander', 'governor', or 'prince'; and sipahsalar, from the Persian for 'army commander'.) was the commander-in-chief of the medieval Georgian army and one of the highest officials of the Kingdom of Georgia, commonly rendered as "Lord High Constable" (and sometimes also as generalissimo) in English.

== History and function ==
The amirspasalar was a wartime supreme commander-in-chief of the royal armies, and the bearer of the state flag. Under Queen Tamar (r. 1184–1213), it was the third great office of the Georgian state, after King and atabek. The Institution of the Royal Court, most probably codified during the second reign of George V (1314–1346) defines the office as "an honorary vizier and the head of army".

The title of amirspasalar is first mentioned in the reign of George III of Georgia (1156–1184), but it was apparently introduced by George's grandfather David IV (r. 1089–1125), who had substantially reformed Georgia's military and civil administration. In the early 12th century the amirspasalar was chosen from the House of Orbeli, but in 1155, David, son of Demetrius I of Georgia, overthrow his father and attempted to curb the Orbeli influence by transferring the post to their rival, Tirkash Abuletisdze.

After Demetrius's restoration, the Orbeli again held the post down to their rebellion against George III in 1176–1177, when it was given to Qubasar, of Kipchak origin. In 1184, Queen Tamar removed Qubasar and appointed a member of the Gamrekeli family. Later, the office passed to the family of Zachariads (Mkhargrdzeli), succeeded by the Jaqeli.

The position was effectively abolished with the dismemberment of the Kingdom of Georgia later in the 15th century.

== See also ==
- Court officials of the Kingdom of Georgia
- Spaspet
