= Kingdom of Eastern Georgia =

Monarchy in Eastern Europe (1256–1329)

Kingdom of Eastern Georgia აღმოსავლეთ საქართველოს სამეფო (Georgian)
- 1256–1329
- Flag of Georgia in the 14th centuries

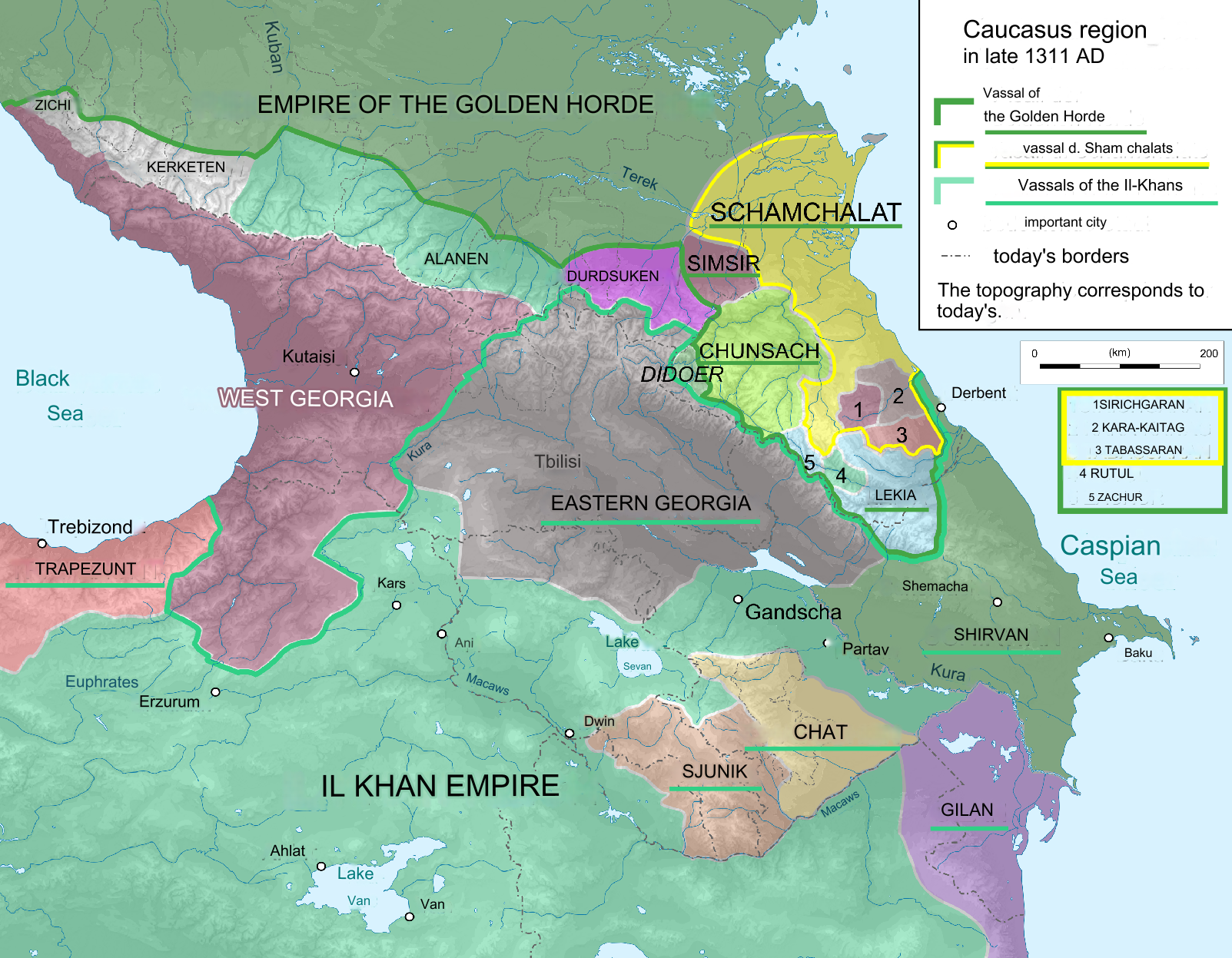
- Map of fragmented Kingdom of Georgia in 1311, with the Western Kingdom of Georgia in purple, and the Eastern Kingdom of Georgia in grey
- Capital: Tbilisi
- Common languages: Middle Georgian
- Religion: Eastern Orthodox Christianity (Georgian Patriarchate)
- Government: Feudal monarchy, Il-Khanid administrative regions Tumans.
  - 1247–1270: David VII
  - 1270–1289: Demetrius II
  - 1289–1292: Vakhtang II
  - 1292–1302: David VIII
  - 1302–1308: Vakhtang III
  - 1308–1311: David VIII
  - 1311–1313: George VI
  - 1314–1346: George V
- Historical era: Late Middle Ages
Preceded by	Succeeded by
Kingdom of Georgia	Kingdom of Georgia

The Kingdom of Eastern Georgia was the official prolongation of the Kingdom of Georgia from 1256 to 1329. Its rule was limited to the geographical areas of central and eastern Georgia, while the western part of the country temporarily seceded to form the Kingdom of Western Georgia under its own line of kings, and the southern regions of Samtskhe-Saatabago and Zakarid Armenia fell under direct Il-Khanid suzerainty. The secession of Western Georgia followed a transitional period when the rule of the Kingdom of Georgia was jointly assumed by the cousins David VI and David VII from 1246 to 1256. The entity split into two parts when David VI, revolting from the Mongol hegemony, seceded in the western half of the kingdom and formed the Kingdom of Western Georgia in 1256. David VII was relegated to the rule of Eastern Georgia. During his reign, Eastern Georgia went into further decline under the Mongol overlordship.

== Mongol conquest ==
Since the 1220s, the Kingdom of Georgia had to contend with the numerous Mongol invasions of Genghis Khan and his successors, the Ilkhanids.

The Mongol commander Chormaqan led, in 1236, a large army against Georgia and its vassal Armenian princedoms. Most of the Georgian and Armenian nobles, who held military posts along the frontier regions, submitted without any serious opposition or confined their resistance to their castles while others preferred to flee to safer areas. Their submission required performing military service for the Mongols. Queen Rusudan had to evacuate Tbilisi for Kutaisi and some people went into the mountainous part of Georgia, leaving eastern Georgia (non-mountain part) in the hands of Atabeg Avag Mkhargrdzeli and Egarslan Bakurtsikheli, who made peace with the Mongols and agreed to pay them tribute. The only Georgian great noble to have resisted was Ivane I Jaqeli, prince of Samtskhe. His extensive possessions were fearfully devastated, and finally Ivane had to, with the consent of Queen Rusudan, submit to the invaders in 1238. In 1239, Chormaqan conquered Ani and Kars in Greater Armenia. The Mongol armies chose not to cross the Likhi Range in pursuit of the Georgian queen, leaving western Georgia relatively spared of the rampages. The country was forced to pay an annual tribute of 50,000 gold pieces and support the Mongols with an army.

Following a disastrous campaign, the Kingdom of Georgia recognized defeat against the Mongols and had to accept submission through the 1239 treaty.

Between 1236 and 1256, before the creation of the Il-Khanate, Caucasia was placed under the military governorship of Chormaqan, and divided into 5 vilayets (provinces): Georgia (Gurjistan), Greater Armenia, Shirvan, Arran, and Mughan, with Armenian principalities becoming fragmented and essentially independent. Georgia was partitioned into 8 Mongol tümen, with each tümen ordered to supply 10,000 soldiers. After 1256, Armenia was directly incorporated into the Il-Khanate founded by Hulegu.

== Joint rule (1246–1256) ==
In 1246, the Mongol Empire confirmed the cousins David VII and David VI as joint kings of King of Georgia by the Mongol Empire, effectively laying ground for a division of the Georgian kingdom.

The "two Davids", as incumbents for the throne of Georgia, David VI and David VII, attended the enthronement ceremony of the Mongol Khan Güyük on 24 August 1246, near the Mongol capital at Karakorum, together with a large number of foreign ambassadors: the Franciscan friar and envoy of Pope Innocent IV, John of Plano Carpini and Benedict of Poland; Grand Duke Yaroslav II of Vladimir; the brother of the king of Armenia and historian, Sempad the Constable; the future Seljuk Sultan of Rum, Kilij Arslan IV; and ambassadors of the Abbasid Caliph Al-Musta'sim and Ala ud din Masud of the Delhi Sultanate. all bearing homage, tribute, and presents. This event was related by the 13th century historian Juvayni:

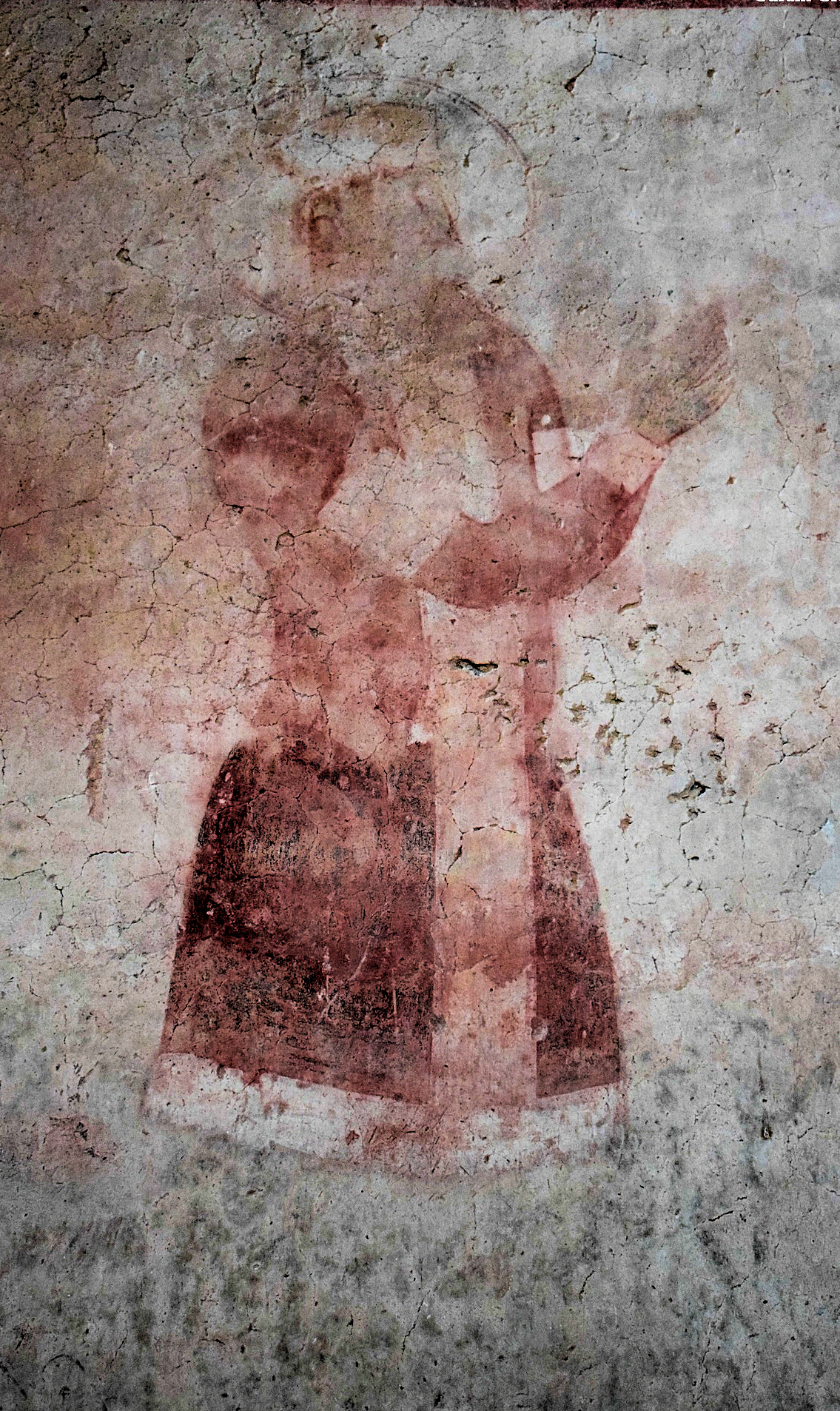
Mural of King David VII Ulugh, first ruler of Eastern Georgia

From Khitai there came emirs and officials; and from Transoxiana and Turkestan the emir Masʿud accompanied by grandees of that region. With the emir Arghun there came the celebrities and notables of Khorasan, Iraq, Lur, Azerbaijan and Shirvan. From Rum came Sultan Rukn al-Din and the Sultan of Takavor (Trebizond); from Georgia, the two Davits; from Aleppo, the brother of the Lord of Aleppo; from Mosul, the envoy of Sultan Badr al-Din Luʾluʾ; and from the city of Peace, Baghdad, the chief qadi Fakhr al-Din. There also came the Sultan of Erzurum, envoys from the Franks, and from Kerman and Fars also; and from ʿAla al-Din of Alamut, his governors in Quhistan, Shihab al-Din and Shams al-Din. And all this great assembly came with such baggage as befitted a court; and there came also from other directions so many envoys and messengers that two thousand felt tents had been made ready for them: there came also merchants with the rare and precious things that are produced in the East and the West.

— Juvayni, 1: 249–50.

The Mongols appointed David VII as ulu ("senior") ruler, while David VI was appointed narin (junior) ruler. The Mongols required the Georgians to provide 90,000 soldiers (calculated at 1/9th of the population), and the agriculture and economy were taxed. They reigned jointly throughout the country for almost a decade under Mongol control. However, the Mongol overlords began to impose heavy taxes on the inhabitants of the Caucasus, leading to numerous popular revolts, particularly in Shirvan.

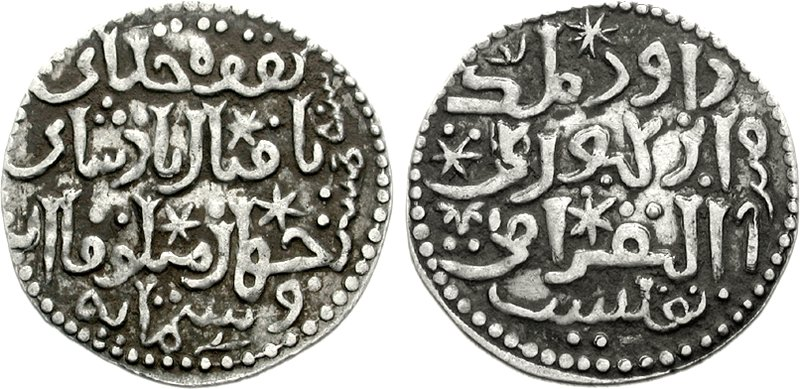
Tiflis coinage in the name of David VII citing Möngke as overlord: "King David, servant of the Khan, the Master of the World". Persian, dated 1253.

In 1259, David VI, who was nicknamed Narin (meaning "junior" in Mongolian) by the Ilkhanid authorities, rebelled against his Mongol suzerain, although he did not drag his royal colleague into the rebellion. The Ilkhanate soon put an end to this revolt after a few short, bloody battles, while David VI managed to take refuge in western Georgia on a secret journey that took him through Armenia. Arriving in Kutaisi, one of the largest towns in western Georgia, he declared the secession of the domains west of the Likhi mountains, and was proclaimed King of the Kingdom of Western Georgia by the local nobility.

Western Georgia then became an independent kingdom, wishing to preserve Georgian culture outside the sphere of influence of the Mongol world. The Ilkhanate was preoccupied with its military campaign in Syria against certain Crusader states and Mamluk Sultanate and was content to increase the tributes imposed on eastern Georgia to rectify the difference in revenue following the loss of a large portion of the taxes from some of the richest Georgian provinces.

== Secession (1256–1329) ==
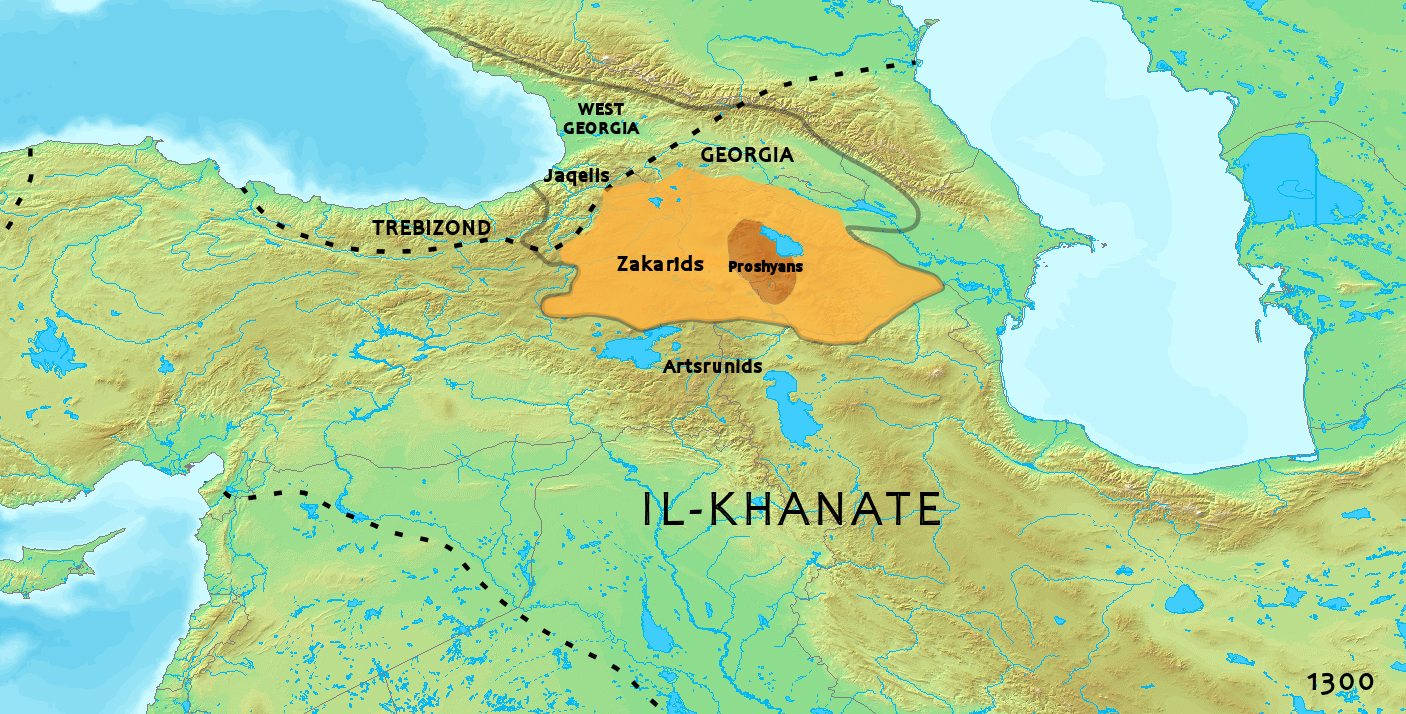
Georgia and Zakarid Armenia as part of the Mongol Il-Khanate (dotted line), after 1256.

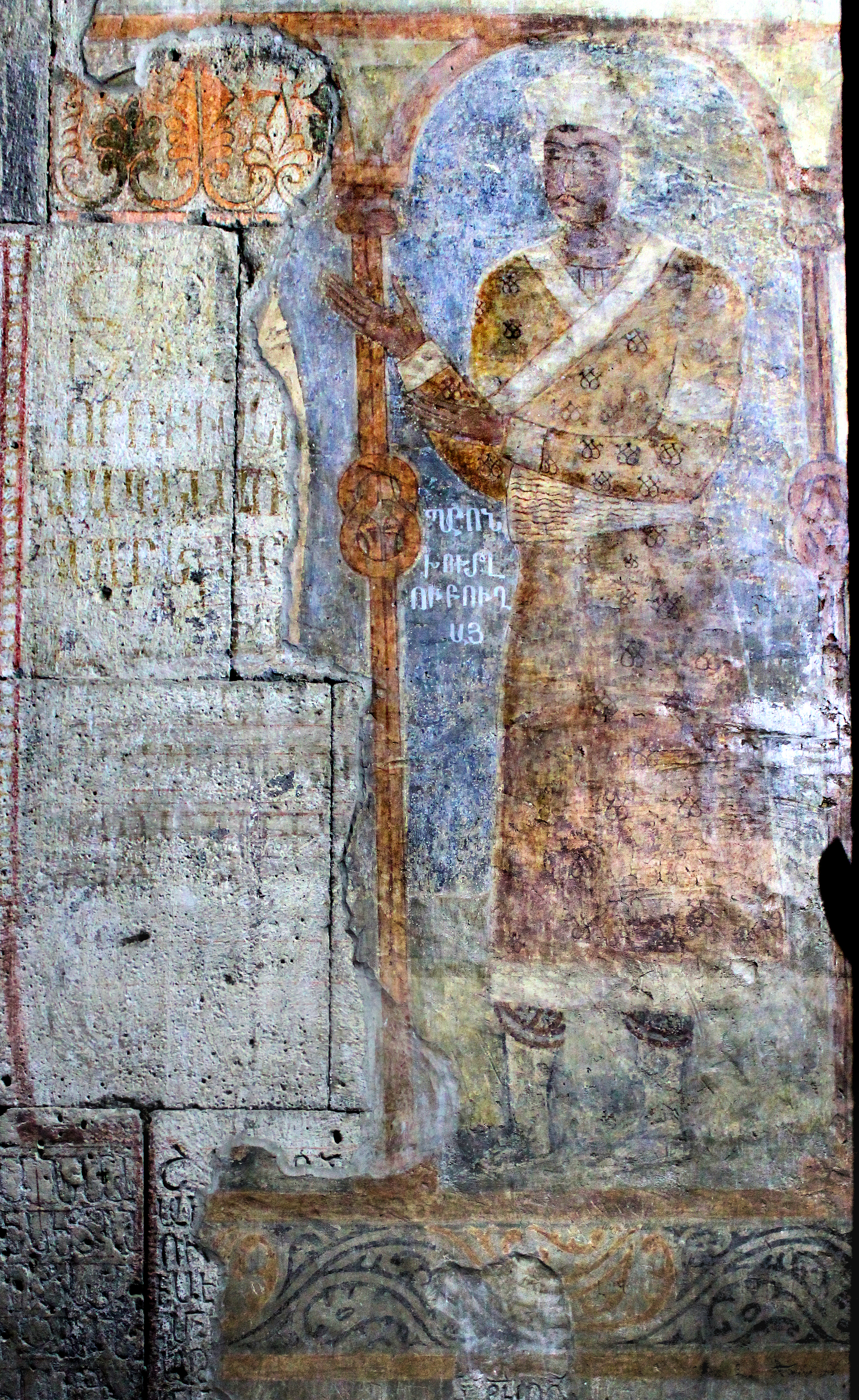
Khutlubuga was Commander-in-Chief of the Georgian Army (Amirspasalar) for Demetrius II. Church of the Holy Sign. Haghpat Monastery, southern wall. Late 13th century.

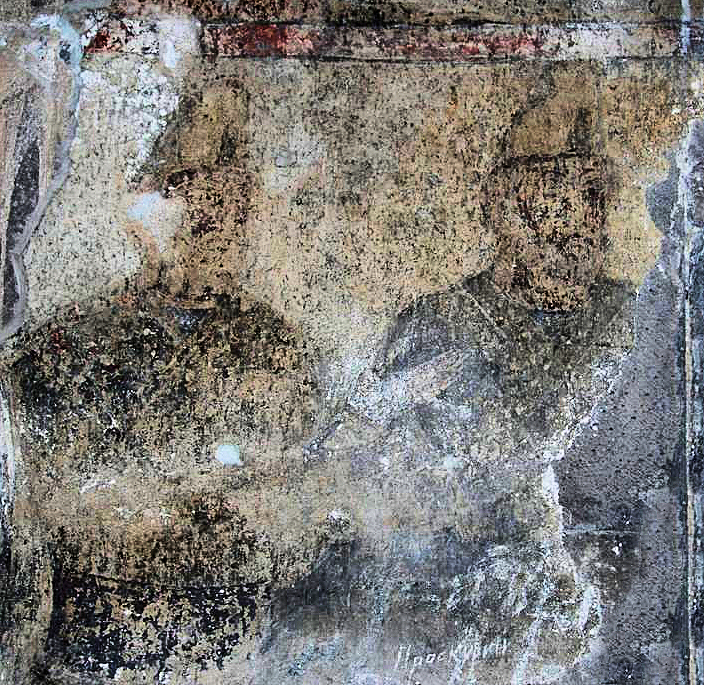
Soldiers in uniform, Kobayr Monastery, 1270s

The Kingdom of Eastern Georgia was under the direct authority of the Mongol ruler Hulagu Khan (r 1256–1265), founder of the Ilkhanate, and was considered as a vassal of the Īlkhānid state. The Mongols also took direct control of the Samtskhe region in southwestern Georgia, as an autonomous principality under Il-khanate rule.

The successive kings of Eastern Georgia from 1256 to 1329 were David VII, Demetrius II, David VIII, Vakhtang III and George V.

At times, Georgia became a battleground between rival Mongol authorities, and in 1265, Berke Khan, the ruler of the Golden Horde, ravaged Eastern Georgia from the north.

=== Mongol control ===
The Mongol maintained control over the Eastern Georgian territory, by maintaining the original kingship within the original Bagratid family, while appointing their own supporters for the offices of the Atabeg (Governor General) and the Amirspasalar (Commander-in-Chief) of the army, as seen with the appointments of Sadun Artsruni (r.1272–1282) or his son Khutlubuga (r.1270–1293). Throughout the 13th century, the high offices Atabeg (Governor General) and Amirspasalar (Commander-in-Chief of the Georgian army) had been held by the Zakarids, but following the Mongol takeover of Eastern Georgia, the Mongol victors gave these offices to the "renegade" Sadun of Mankaberd in 1272. When Abaqa became the new Mongol ruler, Sadun received from him the title of Atabeg Amirspasalar for the Georgian Bagratid Kingdom. He was said to be close to the Mongols, and had been promoted by them: "Sadun Artsruni was appointed as atabeg of Georgia by Abaqa Khan". In his position, he especially controlled the policies of Eastern Georgia, which, while being ruled by Demetre II, remained pro-Mongol throughout.

The Mongols of the Il-Khanate also had a Military Governor or "Viceroy" of Georgia in place, such as Alinaq Noyan (–1289) and his successor Qurumushi (1289–1318).

=== Military operations ===
The Eastern Georgians provided substantial military support to the Mongols: they supported the Siege of Baghdad in 1258, and the Mongol campaigns in Syria from 1259 into the 1260s, leading to thousands of casualties. Sadun Artsruni, future Atabeg for Eastern Georgia, is known to have accompanied Hulegu in his military campaigns in Syria in 1259, in the conquest of Sasun, and in the Siege of Aleppo (1260). But when in 1260 Hulegu Khan requested the presence of Georgians and Armenians for the Mongol invasions of the Levant, remembering the losses of his troops in the 1258 Siege of Baghdad, David Ulu rebelled. A large Mongol army led by General Arghun Aqa invaded Georgia from the south, inflicted a heavy defeat on David and Sargis I Jaqeli in a battle near Akhaldaba, and then brutally plundered the country. The Mongol campaign continued during the winter, and the following year the king was forced to flee to Imereti, which the Mongols failed to conquer. David's family was captured, and his wife Gvantsa was killed. Peace with the Mongols was achieved in 1262, when David Ulu returned to Tbilisi to reclaim his crown as a Mongol vassal, pledging allegiance to Hulegu, while David Narin only nominally recognized Mongol rule in Imereti. The reason for Hulegu's tolerance towards the rebel lies in the fact that since 1261, the Il-kan was at war with the Golden Horde, which was on a larger scale.

The territory of the Caucasus, and as part of it the Kingdom of Georgia itself, became the scene of war between Hulegu and the Khan of the Golden Horde Berke in the following years. David Ulu provided his support for the conflict between the Il-Khanate and the Golden Horde in 1263–1265. In 1263, King David's troops participated in the defense of the Siba fortress against the Golden Horde. In 1265, his troops, as the vanguard of the Ilkhanate army, defeated Berke and pushed his troops out of Shirvan. As Hulegu died in the same year, Berke began to prepare a major offensive. The following year, his army penetrated into Georgia, but the offensive was abruptly stopped due to the death of the khan in the vicinity of Tbilisi.

In 1270, David Ulu led Georgian and Armenian troops in support of the Mongol Abaqa against Tekuder, who had found refuge in Western Georgia.

Demetrius II participated to all Mongol campaigns from 1275 to 1281. In 1277, 3,000 Georgians fought with the Mongols against the Mamluk Sultanate of Egypt in the battle of Abulistan. Georgian troops were present in great number at the Second Battle of Homs (1281).

In 1284, Georgian and Armenian troops had to participate in the dynastic conflict between the Il-Khanate ruler Tekuder and Arghun, with troops under the Vicery of Georgia Alinaq Noyan and under Tekuder himself.

The relationship was tumultuous: in 1289, King Demetrius II was executed by the Mongols, at the instigation of Khutlubuga. His son, the future David VIII, had to participate in the Mongol invasion of Anatolia in 1291–1292.

=== Religious revolts ===
The Mongol Emir Nawrūz, son of Arghun Aqa, started to implement anti-Christian policies, in relation with the adoption of Islam by his ruler Ghazan. Suddenly, Christians and Jew were segregated against, and had to wear distinctive types of dresses. Churches were being destroyed throughout the Middle-East, but also in Georgia, at Siwnik‘, Somkhit and Kartli. These events provoked popular rebellions and threat of military uprisings against the Mongols. Because of this, Nawrūz was replaced by Qutlughshāh on the orders of Ghazan. Nawrūz then plotted against Ghazan, but was denounced with the help of the Armenian Princes Eachi Pŕoshian and Liparit Orbelian, and was finally executed.

A unified Georgia was reestablished by George V of Georgia in 1329, as he reasserted royal control over the western part of Georgia through the astute usage of Mongol forces, and ultimately managed to expel the Mongols from Georgian lands. This coincided with a weakening of the Ilkhanate, which was engulfed in civil war in 1335–1344. Georgia would again suffer invasion at the hands of Timurlane from 1386 onward.

=== Art ===
Khutlubuga was a patron for the murals at the Church of the Holy Sign, in the Haghpat Monastery, probably during his time as Amirspasalar in the 1280s. He appears in person, with the inscription of his name. He wear a wrap-around caftan with decorative inserts, and has a low triangular headgear. This is a very useful marker for the clothing styles and for the dating of works of art of the period. They are contemporary with the murals at Kobayr by the family of the Zakarids, nominal vassals of the Georgian crown.

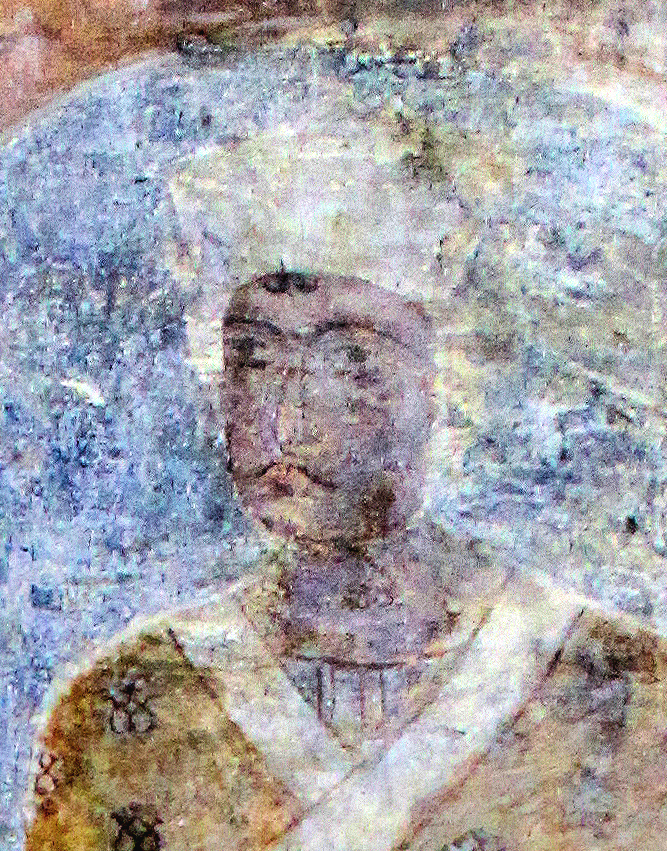
Portrait of Khutlubuga, 1280s

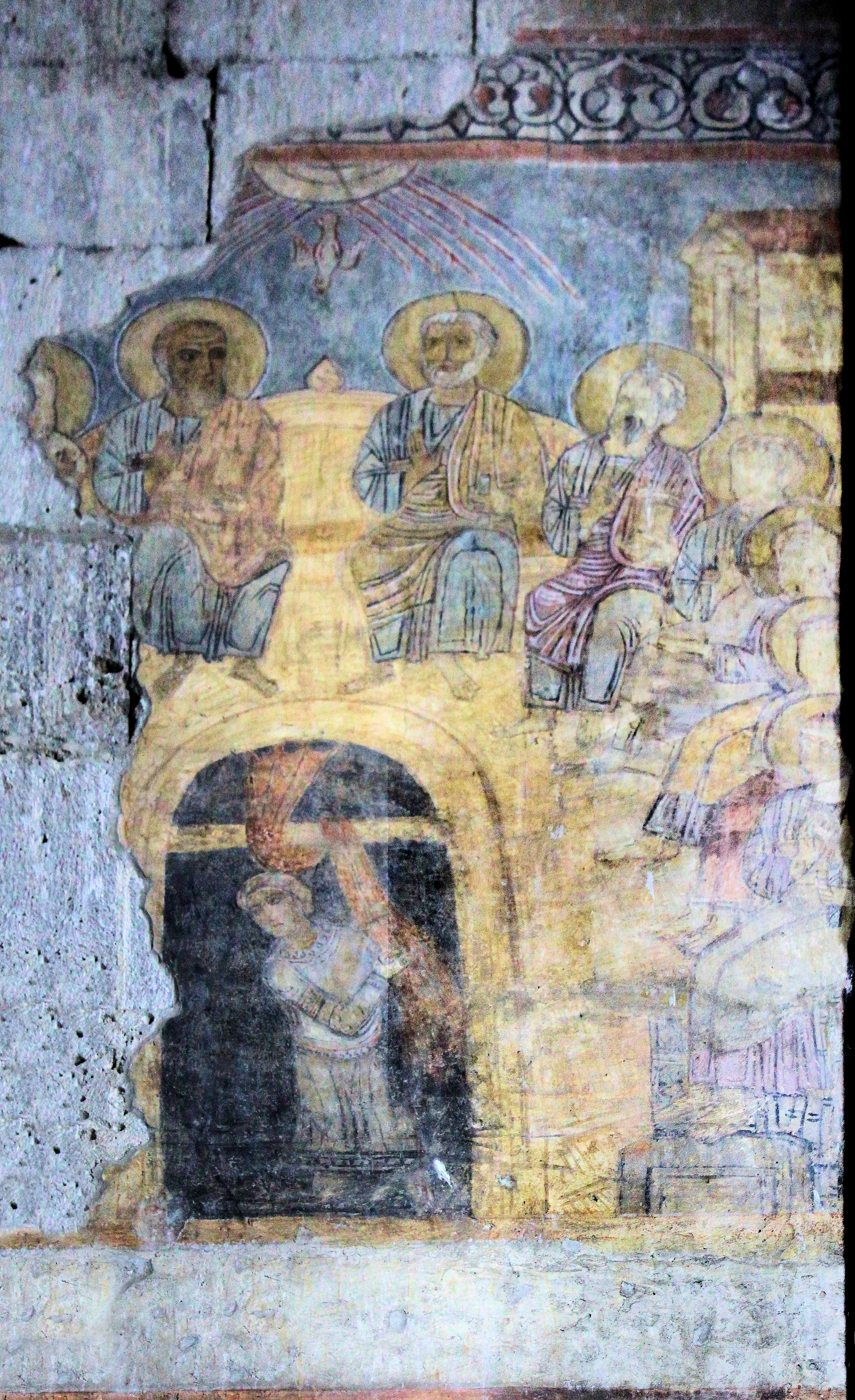
Haghpat Monastery mural, 1280s

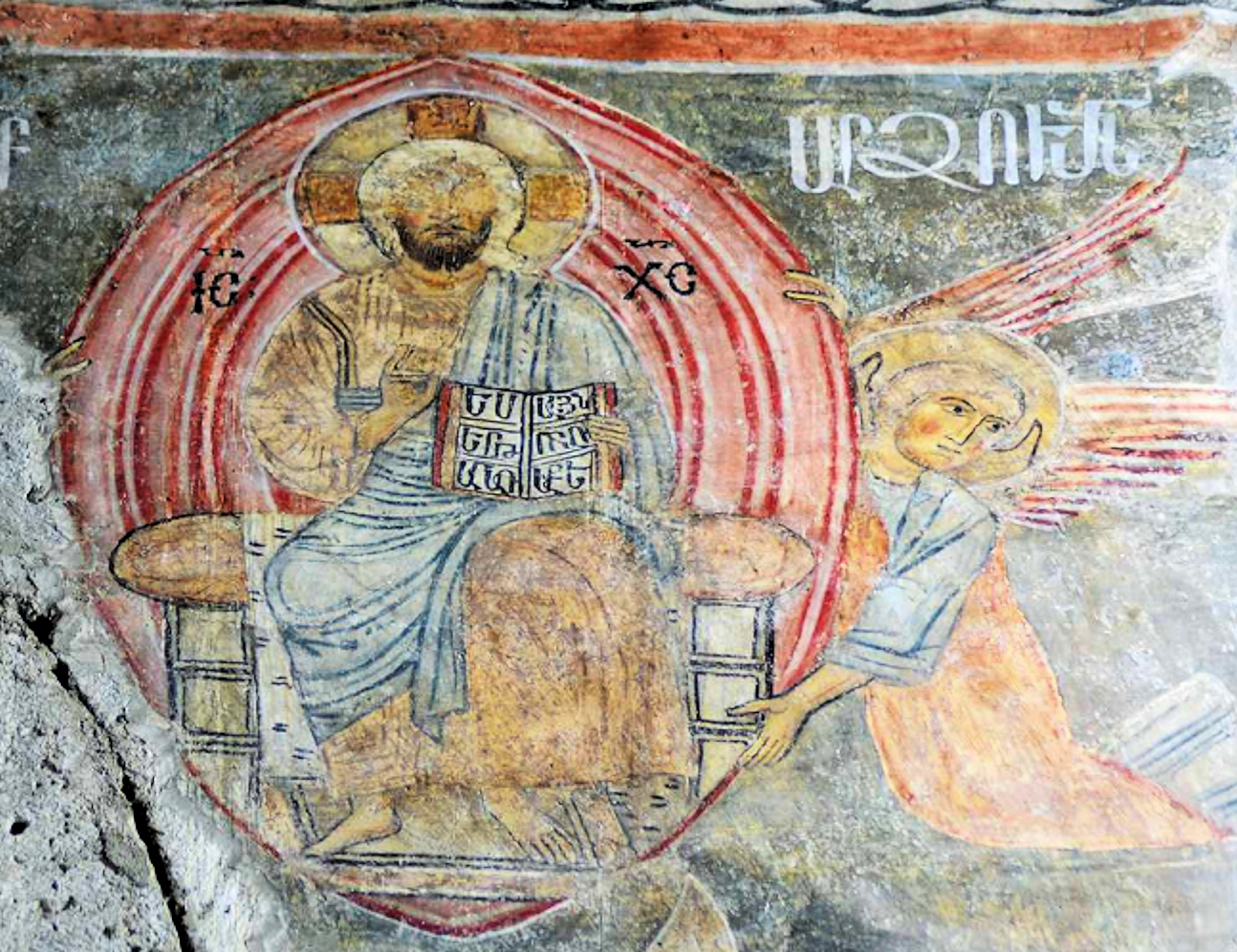
Haghpat Monastery mural, 1280s

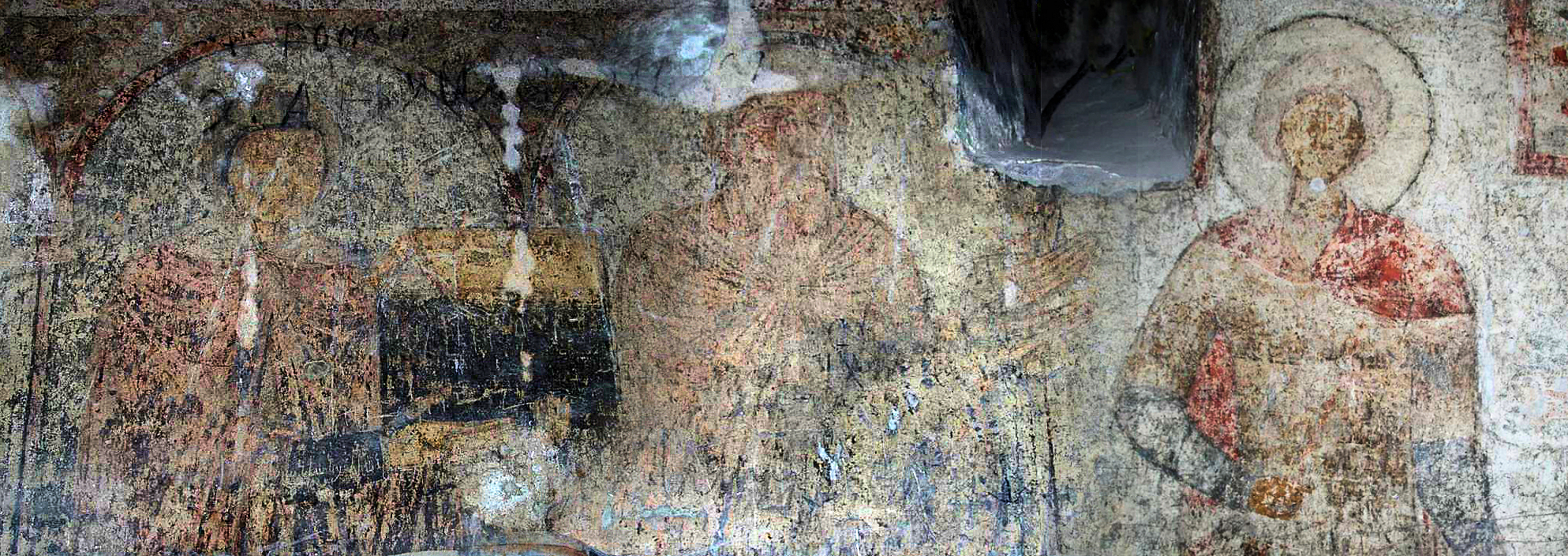
Shahnshah and his family as donators at the Kobayr Monastery, 1270s.

== Il-Khanid dismemberment ==
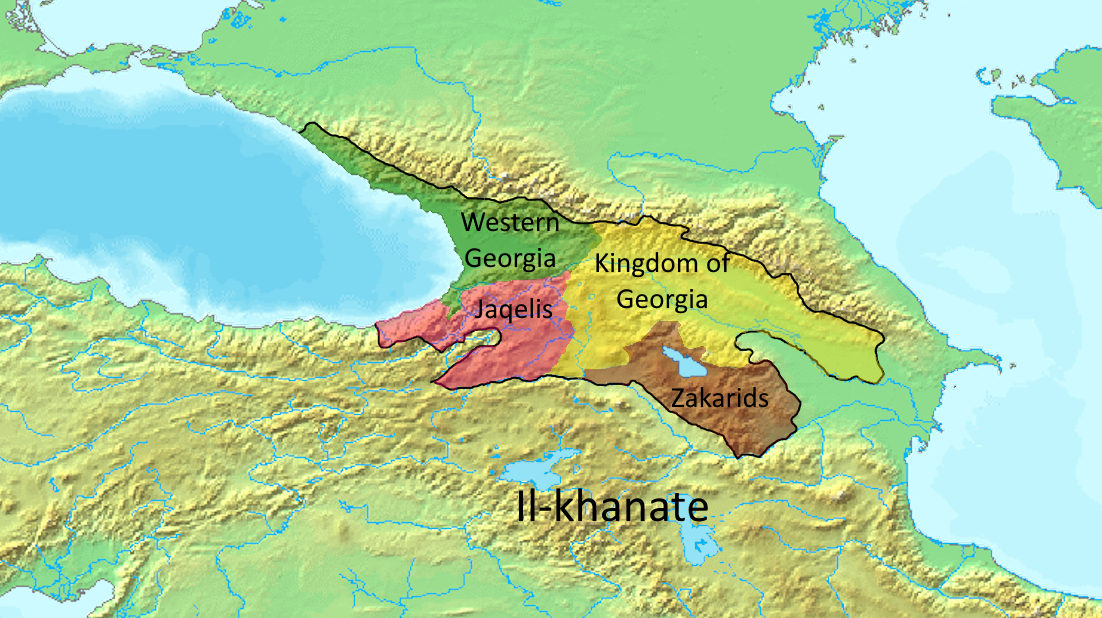
Kingdom of Georgia under Mongol rule. The Jaqelis and Zakarids were under direct Il-khanid suzerainty. Western Georgia was independent.

Following the Mongol invasions of Georgia in 1236, Georgia and the Zakarid principality were organized into a province broken down into 8 administrative units (tumans). 5 of the tumans were Georgian while the remaining 3, composed of the Zakarid principality in Kars and Ani, as well as, the Awagids in Syunik and Artsakh, were Armenian.

=== House of Jaqeli ===
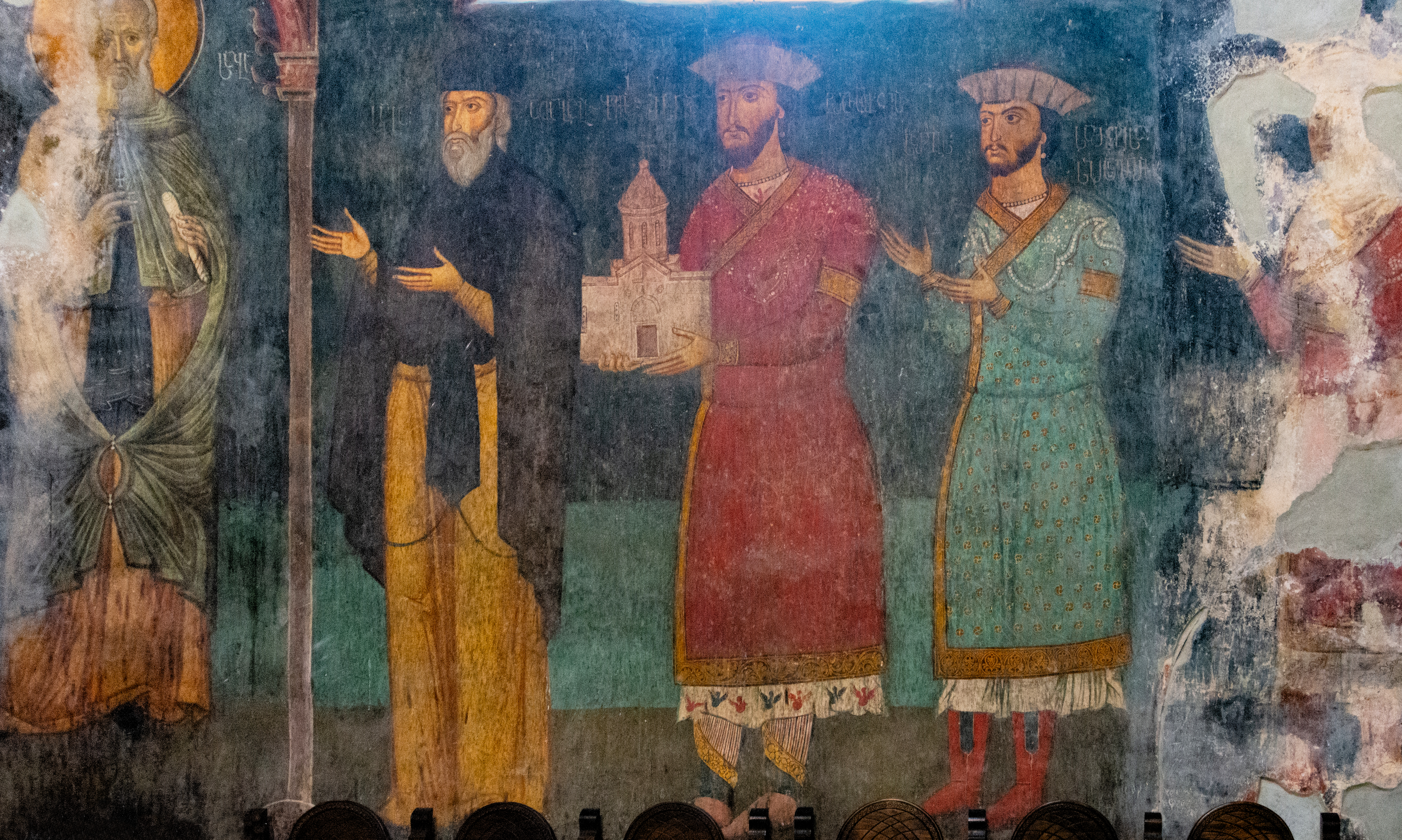
A group portrait of Princes Jaqeli (from left to right: Sargis I Jaqeli (Sabas), Beka, Sargis, and Kvarkvare). Sapara monastery, 14th c

The Georgian House of Jaqeli in Samtskhe-Saatabago emerged when Ivane-Qvarqvare of Tsikhisjvari (fl. c. 1195-1247) was enfeoffed by Queen Tamar with Botso's titles and possessions. It attained, in the person of Sargis I (r. c. 1260-1285), to the hereditary principate of Samtskhe. The House of Jaqeli became de facto independent of the kings of Georgia under the protectorate of Mongol Ilkhanate in 1268. Relations with the Georgian crown were still maintained, with rulers such as Beka I Jaqeli (c. 1240–1306) receiving the title of Mandaturukhutsesi (Mandator) by Georgian kings.

Beka I Jaqeli was a vassal of the Ilkhanate, paid regular tributes and participated in their campaigns. Paintings of the House of Jaqeli during the period show them wearing the caftan with tiraz bands on the sleeves inscribed with Kufic letters. Their caftan is decorated with the cloud collars made of pearl embroidery, a design of Mongol Ilkhanate origin. This is also the costume worn at the time by the courtiers at the Mongol court in Tabriz.

=== Zakarid Armenia ===
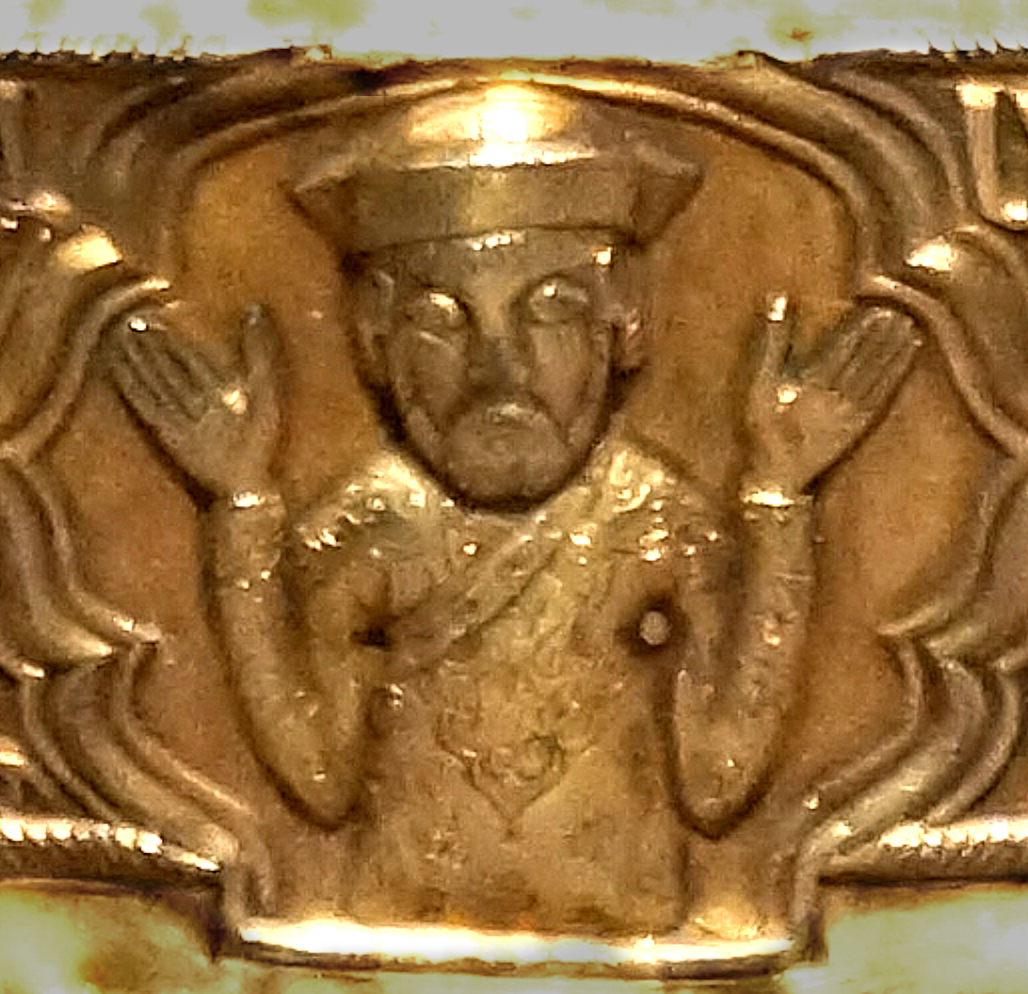
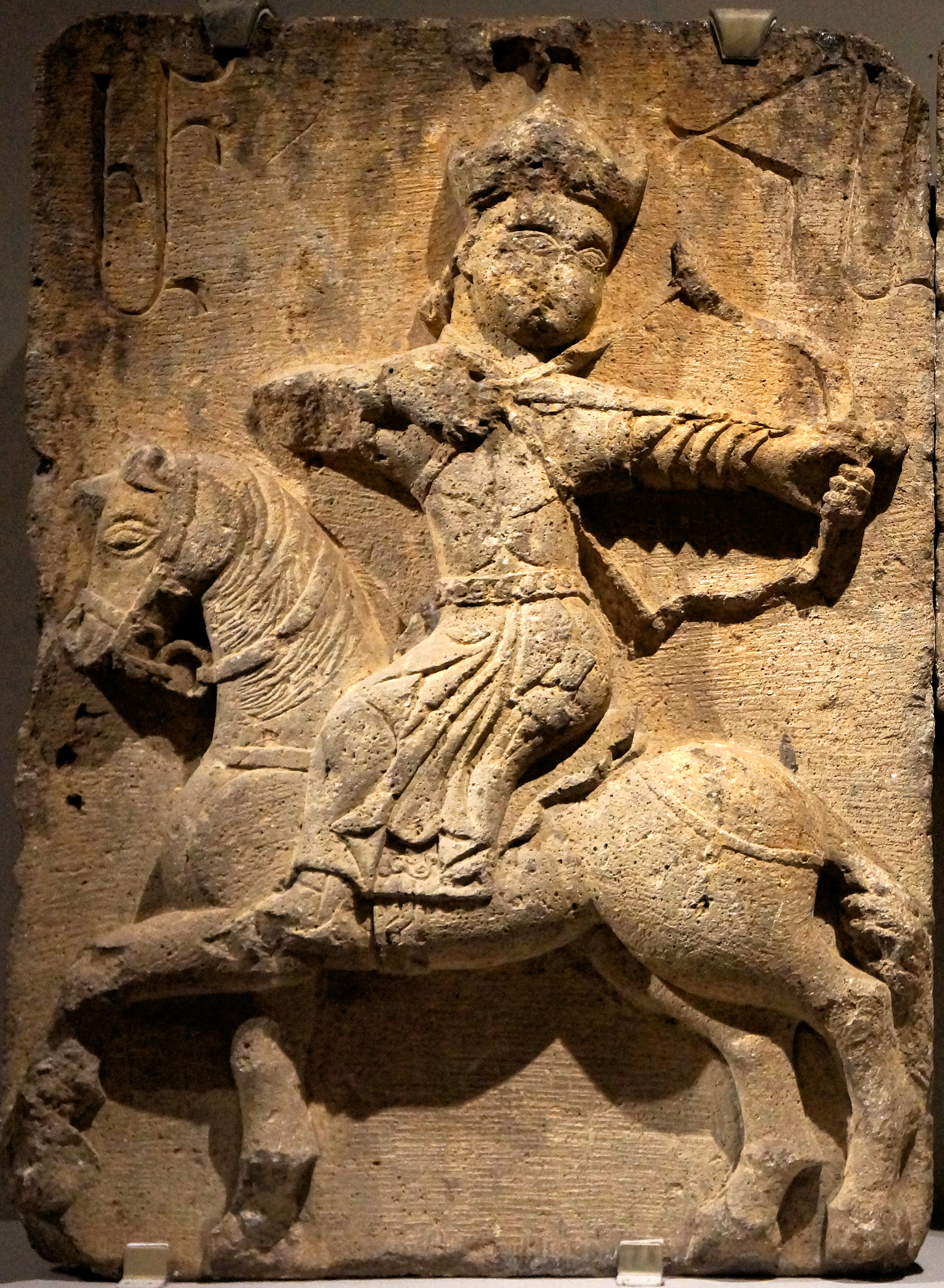
Armenian Prince Eacch'i Proshian wearing a Mongol-style dress (cloud collar and Mongol hat) in c. 1300, and his son Amir Hasan II hunting on horseback in Mongol attire (1321).

The Zakarids were originally vassals to the Bagrationi dynasty of the Kingdom of Georgia, but frequently acted independently In 1236, they fell under the rule of the Mongol Empire as a vassal state with local autonomy.

From 1236 to 1246, the Mongols did not interfere with the governing structure of the Zakarid state and appointed the Zakarids as heads of the tumans. While Zakarid Armenia was a vassal state of the Mongols and therefore subject to taxes and loyalty to the Khan, they were otherwise left to govern themselves and had relative autonomy during this period.

The Armenians had to participate to most of the campaigns of the Mongols. They participated to the Siege of Baghdad in 1258. In 1259–1260, Shahnshah Zakarian participated to the Mongold-led Siege of Mayyāfāriqīn, together with the Armenian Prince Prosh Khaghbakian. The reduced Kingdom of Georgia (1256–1329) also under Mongol control, participated to most of these campaigns as well. In 1265, Armenian and Georgian troops participated to the conflict between the Golden Horde and the Ilkhanate, ultimately defeating Berke in Shirvan.

In 1284, Georgian and Armenian troops had to participate in the dynastic conflict between the Il-Khanate ruler Tekuder and Arghun, with troops under the Vicery of Georgia Alinaq Noyan and under Tekuder himself.

== Final Mongol period (1329–1386) ==
=== Coinage and Mongol control ===
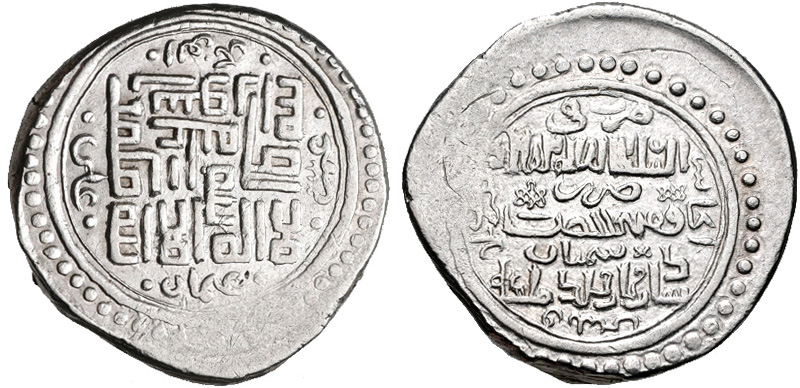
Coin of Abu Sa'id Bahadur, minted in Tiflis (Tbilisi) in 1334–1335

George V of Georgia (ruled 1299-1302, and again 1318-1346) is widely credited with restoring Georgian independence from the Mongols, but according to the numismatic evidence however, he may not have been that successful. Standard Il-Khanid coins continued to be minted in Tiflis until the 1350s, and no coins in the name of George V are known, suggesting continued effective control by the Mongols throughout the period. Only a few dubious examples, claimed by D. Kapanadze to belong to George V, were discovered in a 14th century hoard.

During the reign of George V, including during the second part of his reign (1327–46), the Georgians had little control of the coinage being issued in Tiflis and Kakheti. During this period, the main coinage of Georgian mints remained that of the Mongol Ilkhanate, mainly dirhams.

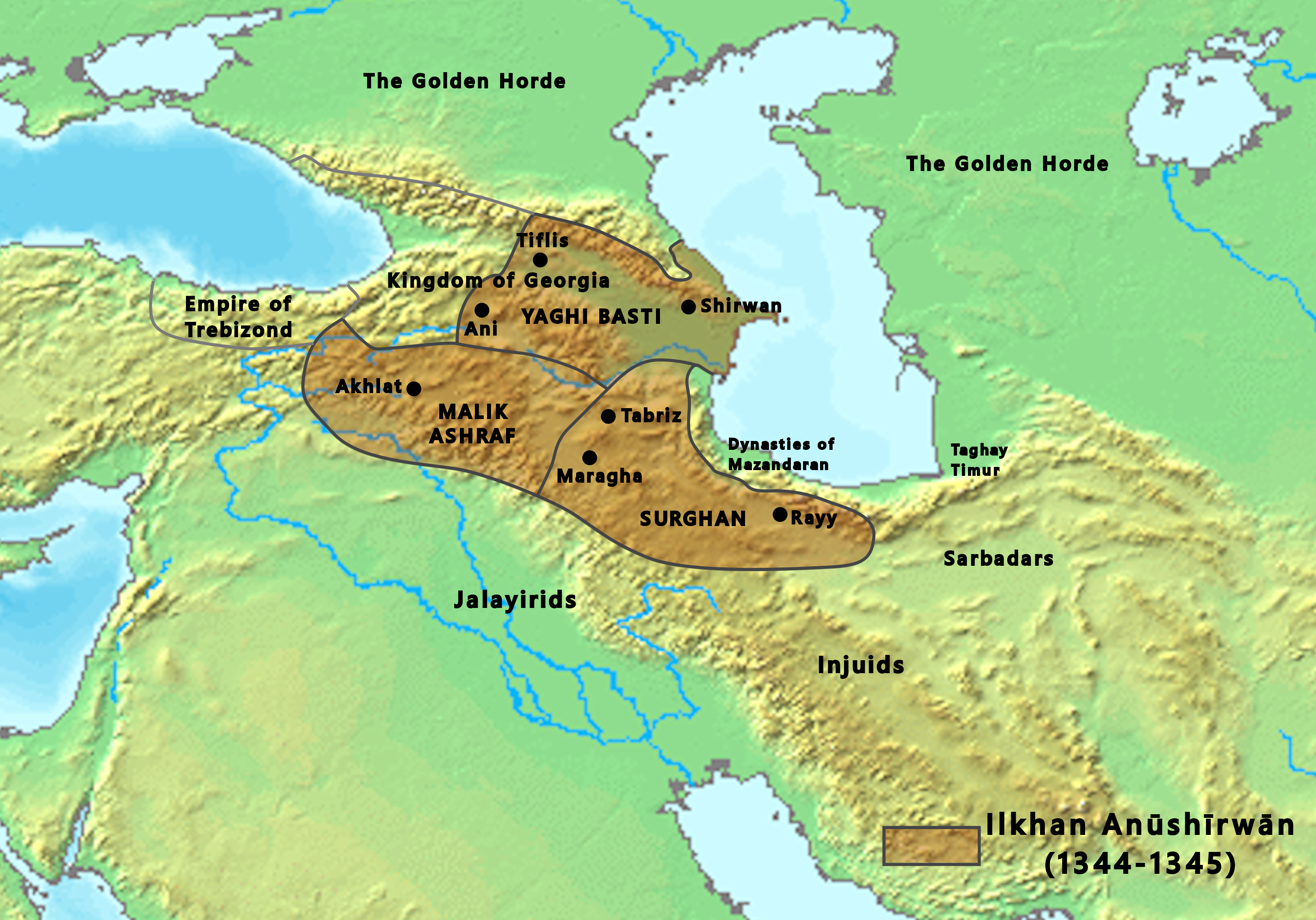
Division of Anūshīrwān’s domains among the Chopanids, including eastern Georgia, according to the agreement of 745 (1344–5).

Even after the death of the last Ilkhanid Emperor Abu Sa'id in 1335, when several Mongol clans vied for power and installed puppet rulers, the coinage minted in Eastern Georgia was still that of these Mongol puppet rulers. The Il-Khanid mints at Tiflis and at Qara-Aghach in Kakhet'i continued to function in an uninterrupted manner, although the Georgian chronicle remain quite about this period.

In Tbilisi, the following coins of Il-Khanate successors were minted: Abu Said's successor Arpa Khan (A.H. 736=1335/36), the Jalayirid Muhammad Khan (A.H. 738=1337/38), and, following the Chobanid conquest of Azerbaijan and Georgia in 1338, the successive Mongol Chobanid rulers Sati Beg Khatun (A.H. 739=1338/39), Suleyman Khan (A.H. 740=1339/40; A.H. 741=1340/41; A.H. 743=1342/43), and Anushirwan (A.H. 745=1344/45; A.H. 748=1347/48; A.H. 750–756=1349–1354). The last Il-Khanid ruler Ghazan II (1356–57) also minted coins in Tiflis.

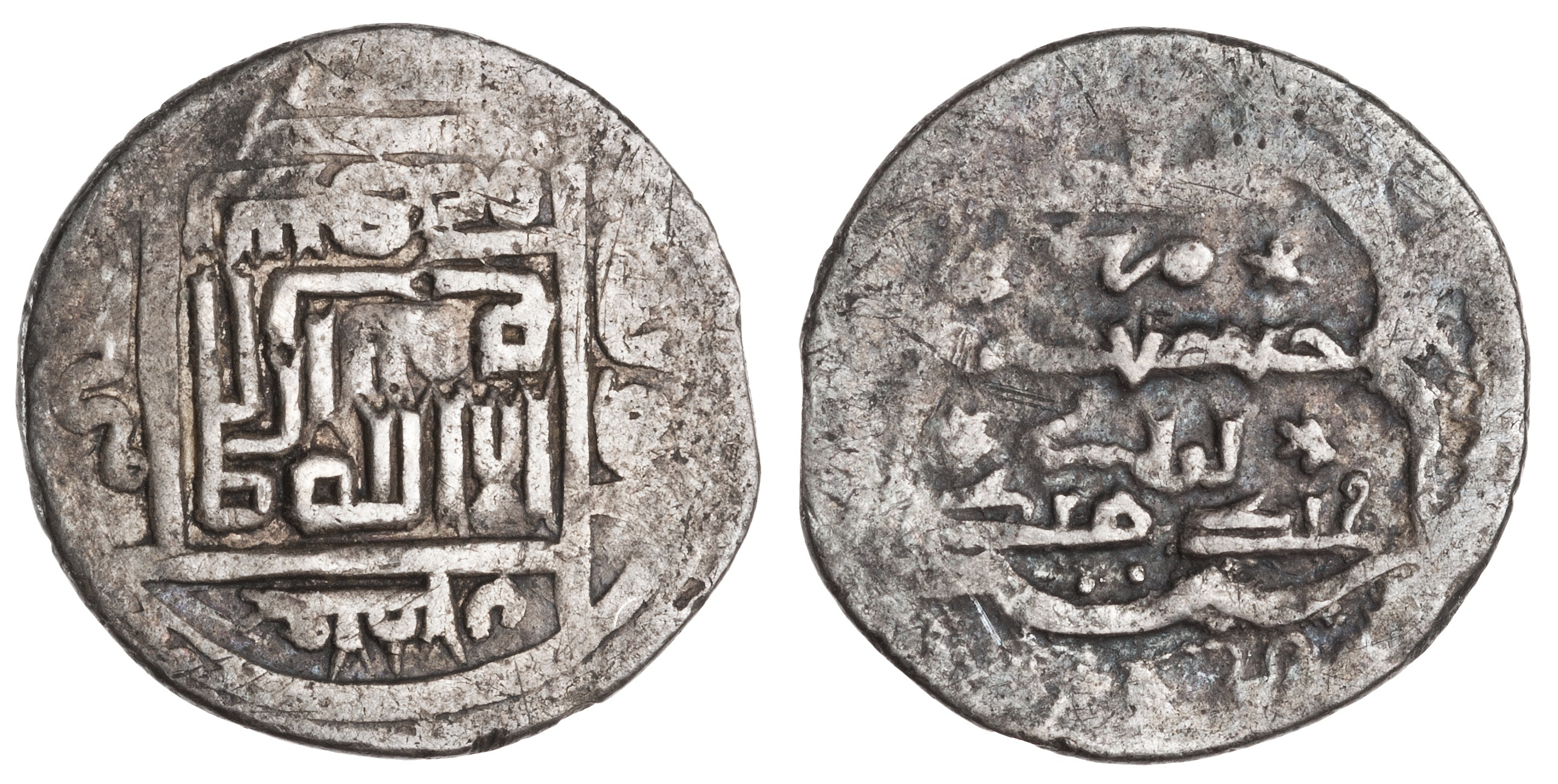
Silver coin minted in Tiflis (Tbilisi) bearing the name of Mongol ruler Anushirwan (1344–1357). Struck between 1344 and 1353 during the rules of George V and his successor David IX.

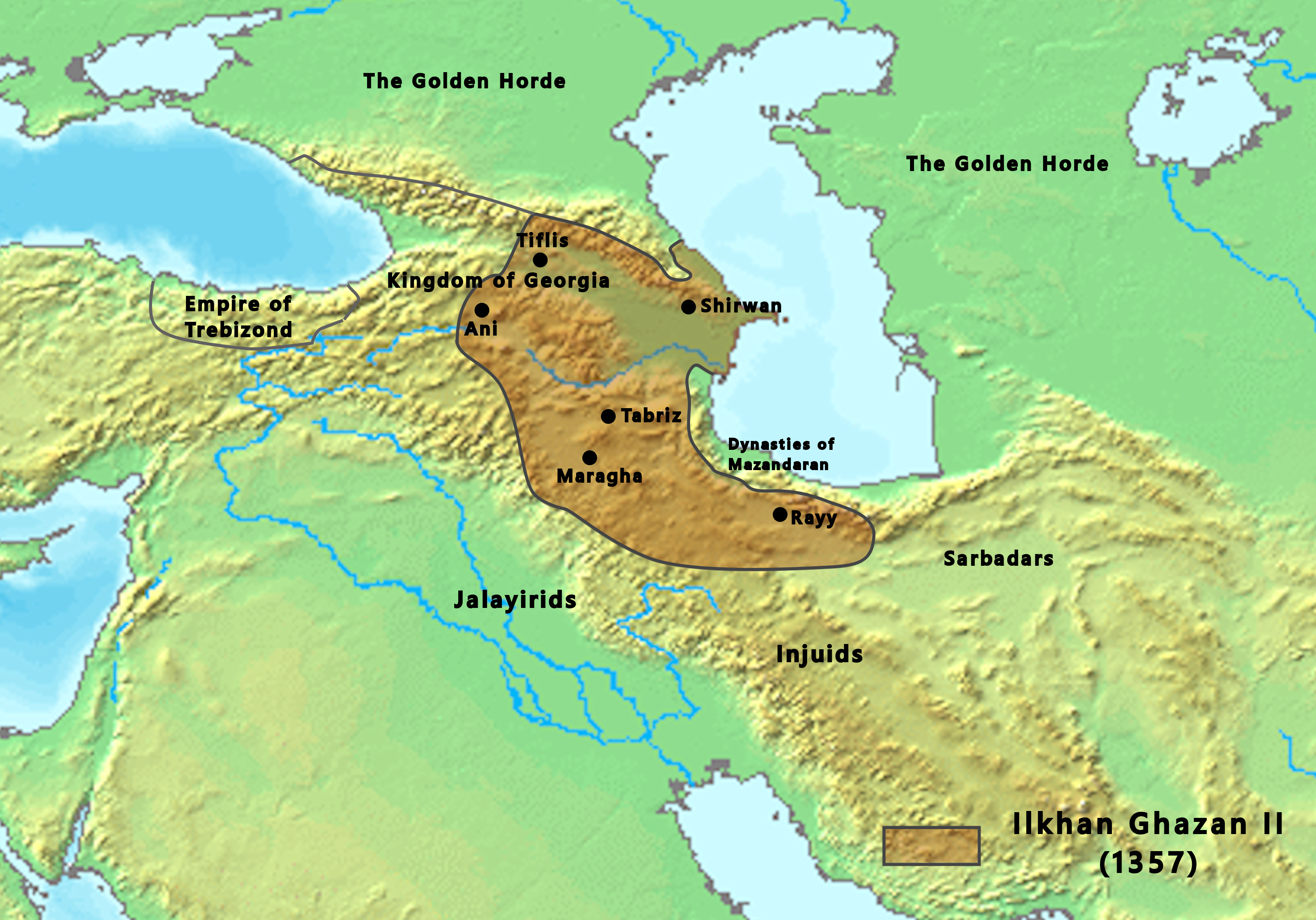
Territory of Ghazan II in 1357

If George V had achieved true independence from the Mongol, he would certainly not have minted their coinage. This indicates that Tiflis and eastern Georgia remained strictly under the control of the Ilkhanate during the mid-14th century.

Even the successors of Georges V have no known coinage, neither David IX (ruled 1346–1360) nor Bagrat V (1360–93), mainly owing to the successive "Tatar invasions". The Chobanids were overrun by the forces of the Golden Horde under Jani Beg in 1356-57. Jani Beg occupied the Georgian capital of Tiflis in 1356, and issued his own coinage there, followed by the coinage of his son Berdi Beg Juchid. Then the Chobanid ruler Malek Asraf was executed and Azerbaijan was conquered by the Jalayirids. Following Jani Beg's withdrawal, as well as his son Berdi Beg’s similar abandonment of the region in 1358, the area became a prime target for its neighbors, especially the Turco-Mongol Jalayirids. Shaykh Uways Jalayir, who at first had recognized the sovereignty of the Blue Horde, decided to take the former Chobanid lands for himself, even as a former amir of Malek Asraf’s named Akhichuq attempted to keep the region in Mongol hands. The Jalayirids occupied Tiflis in 1357-1358, where they also minted their own coinage in the name of Shaykh Uways Jalayir.

=== Art ===
A few Georgian Gospels are known from the period, such as Manuscript H-1665 (1350-1400). Some of the weapons described in miniatures appear to reflect Mongol influences, such as Mongolian-type composite bows with a middle plate seam and a massive insert at the ends.

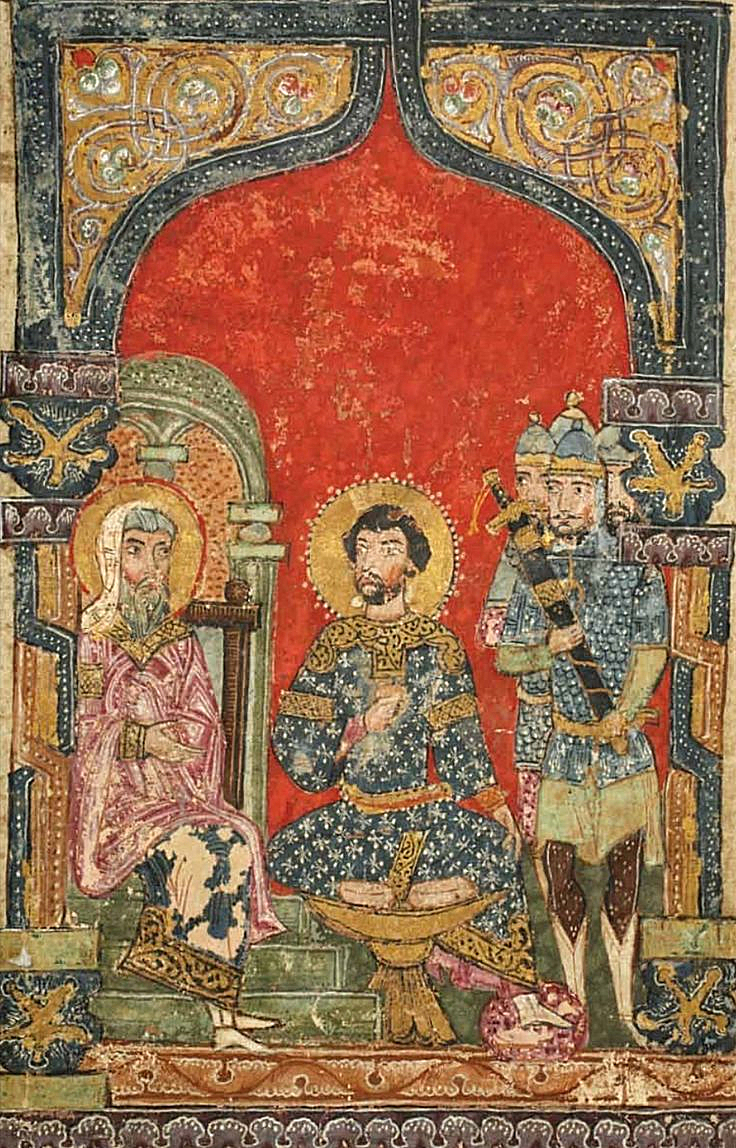
Georgian Gospel MS H-1665 (1350-1400).

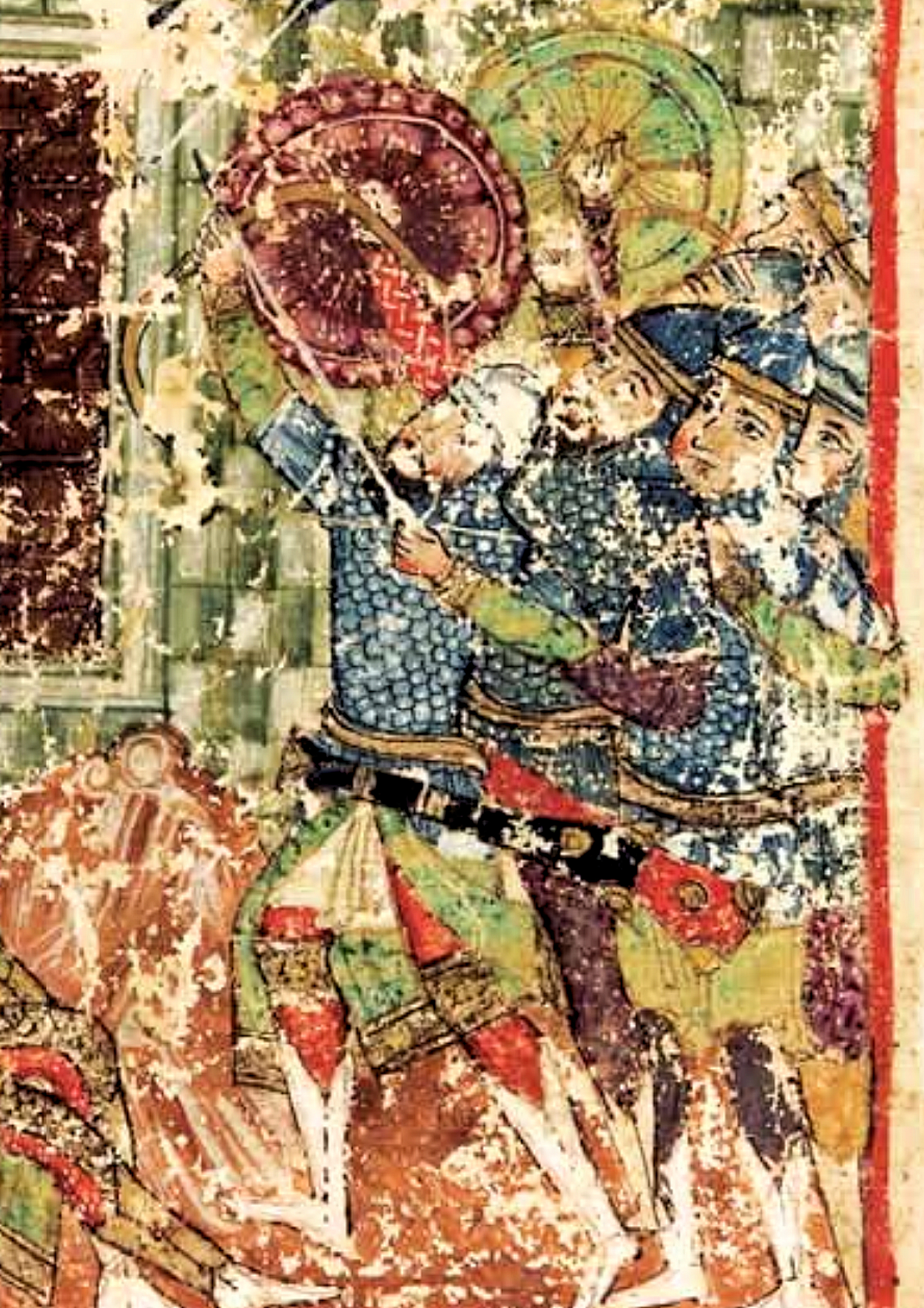
Georgian fighter shooting a composite bow. H1665, p. 199v. National Manuscript Center.

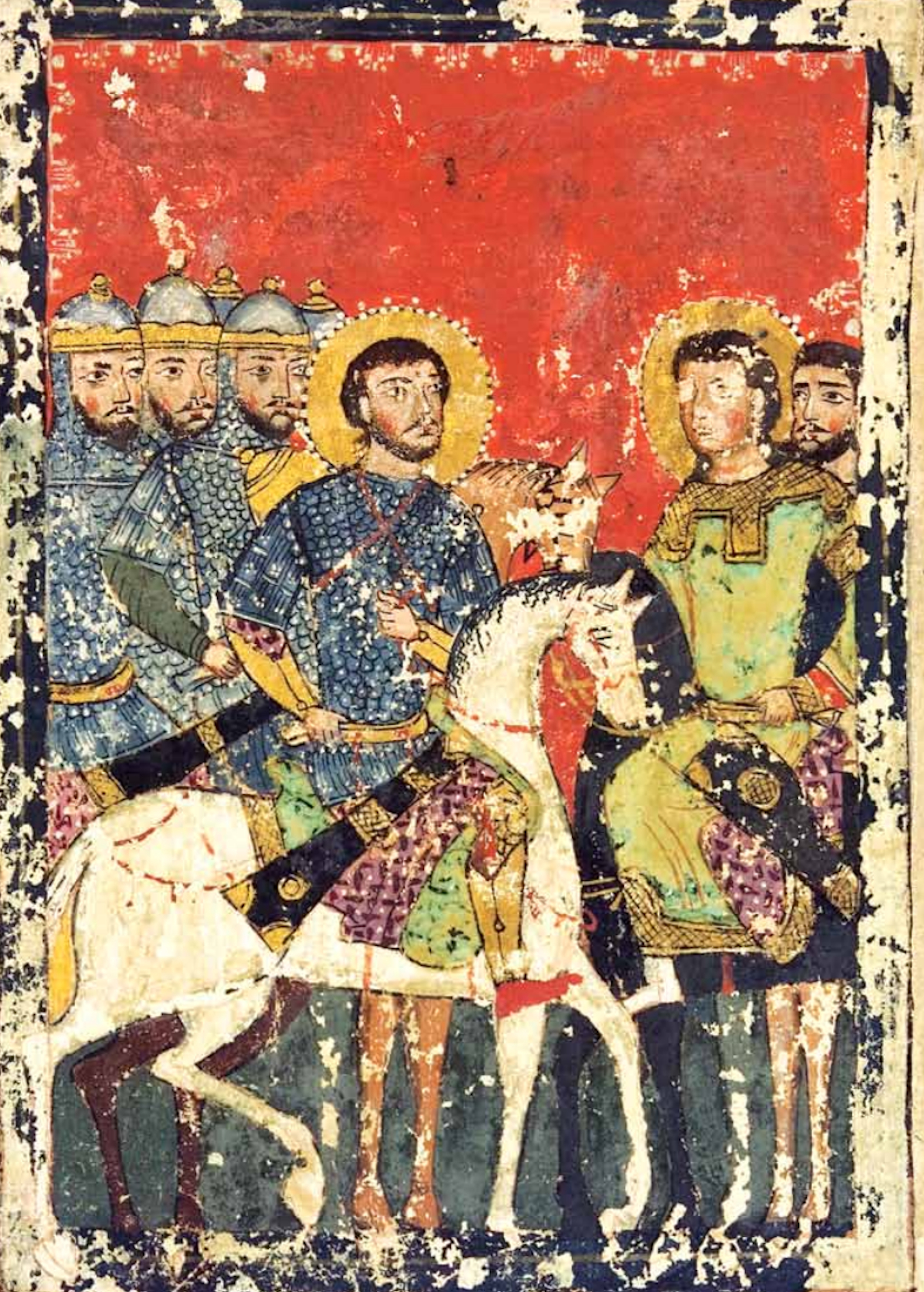
David meeting with Jonathan, with Mongol-style quiver and bowcase. H1665, 83. 182v. National Manuscript Center.

== Timurid Turco-Mongol control (1386–1412) ==
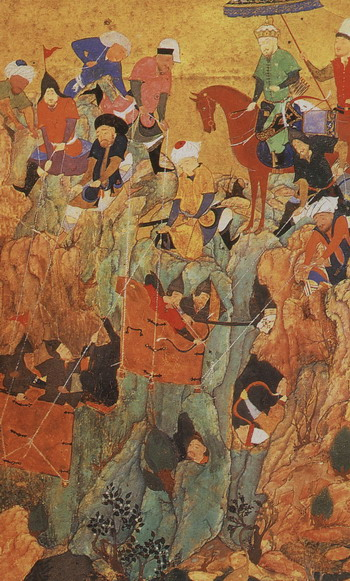
Emir Timur's army attacks the survivors of the town of Nerges, in Georgia, in the spring of 1396. Garrett Zafarnama (c. 1480)

Between 1386 and 1404, the Turco-Mongol forces of Timur raided the countries of Transcaucasia from their bases in northern Iran, while also fighting the Tokhtamysh–Timur war with the Golden Horde. Tiflis was finally conquered by Timur in 1404, and King George VII was forced to recognize Timurid suzerainty. Armenia too, which had been under Mongol Jalayirid control, was incorporated into the Timurid realm. Of the surviving population, more than 60,000 of the local people were captured as slaves, and many districts were depopulated.

Following the death of Timur, Tumurid power in the Caucasus deteriorated, and by the early 1410s, King Alexander I of Georgia (r. 1412–1442) was reasserting independence. But the Turkic Kara Koyunlu gained control of Armenian territory and made Ani their capital circa 1406 before transferring it to Yerevan. The Kara Koyunlu started the Turkoman invasions of Georgia (1407–1502), such as the raids led by Qara Yusuf in Akhaltsikhe in 1416, followed by the offensives of the Aq Qoyunlu, with the sack of Tbilissi in 1440, ultimately participating to the Collapse of the Georgian realm.

Georgia would again be threatened with the rise of the Safavid Empire in 1501, and especially Tahmasp I's Kakhetian and Kartlian campaigns in 1541–1566.

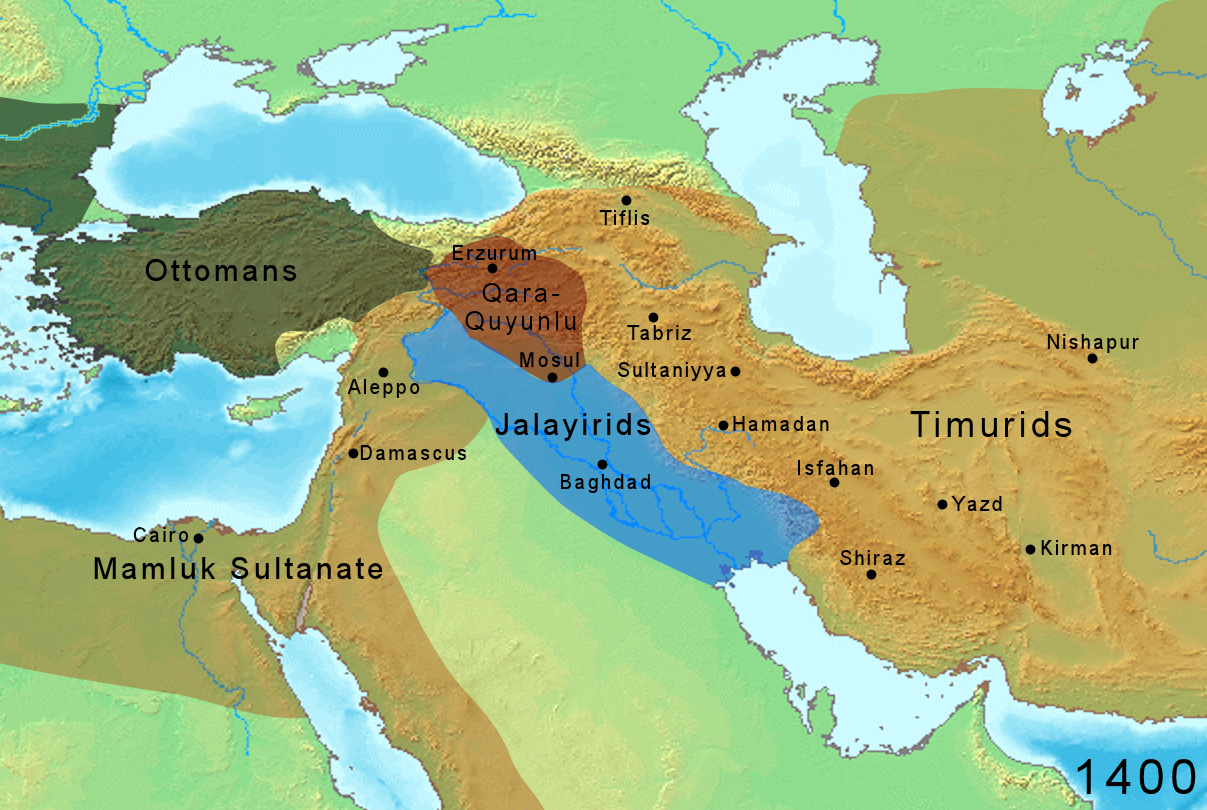
Jalayirid and Timurid territories in 1400.

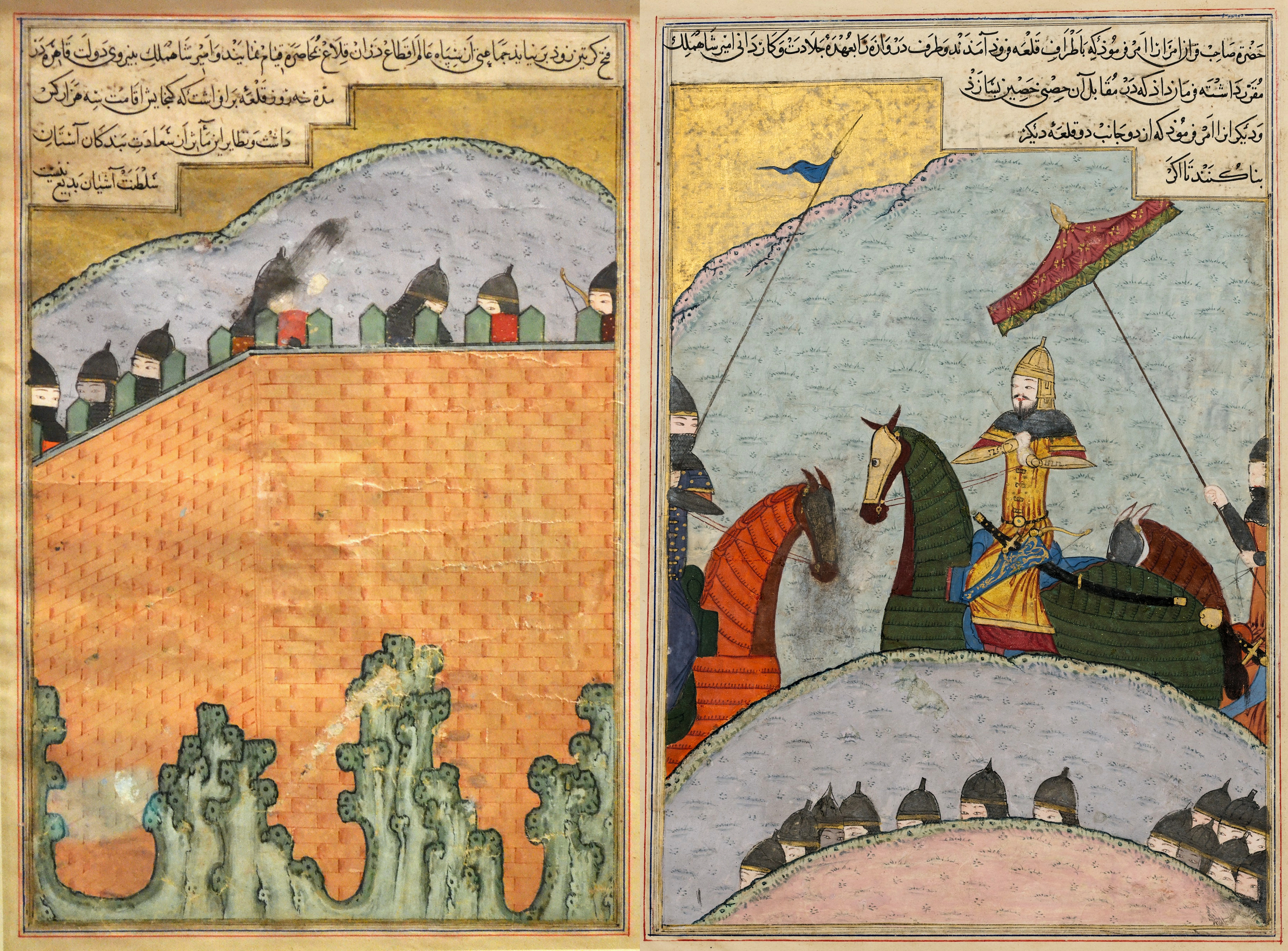
Timur besieges the Georgian castle of Gortin, 3 August 1401. Zafarnama of 1436

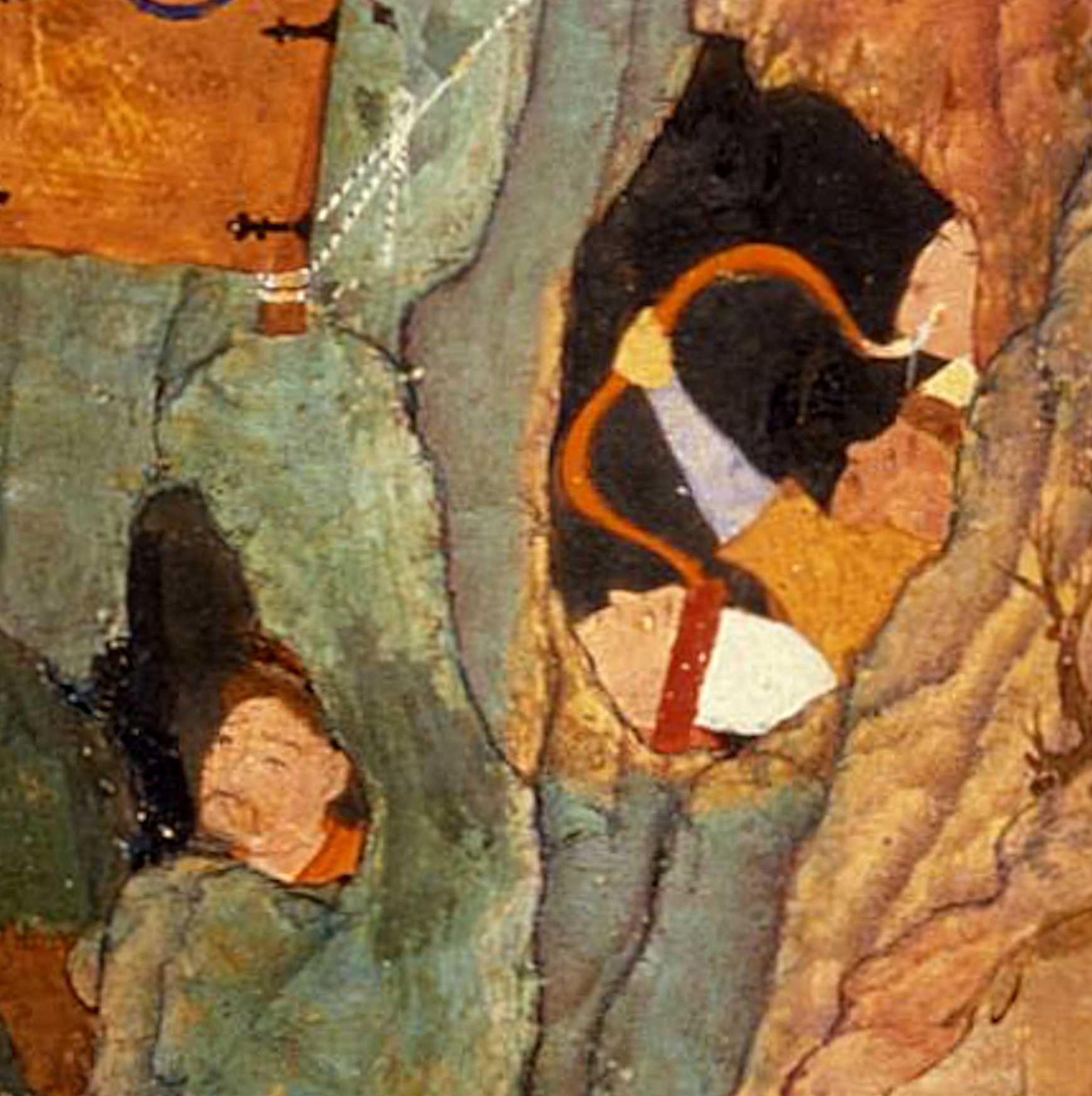
Last Georgian survivors of the town of Nerges, in Georgia, in the spring of 1396. Garrett Zafarnama (c. 1480)

== Sources ==
- Bai︠a︡rsaĭkhan, D. (2011). The Mongols and the Armenians (1220-1335). Leiden; Boston: Brill. ISBN 978-9-0041-8635-4.
- Brosset, Marie-Félicité (1849). Histoire de la Géorgie depuis l'Antiquité jusqu'au XIXe siècle. Volume I [History of Georgia from Ancient Times to the 19th Century, Volume 1] (in French). Saint-Petersburg: Imperial Academy of Sciences.
- Brosset, Marie-Félicité (1856). Histoire de la Géorgie depuis l'Antiquité jusqu'au XIXe siècle - IIe partie: Histoire moderne. Saint Petersburg Academy of Sciences.
- Dashdondog, Bayarsaikhan (2010). "Mongol Administration in Greater Armenia (1243–1275)". In Drompp, Michael; Deweese, Devin (eds.). The Mongols and the Armenians (1220-1335). Brill's Inner Asian Library. Vol. 24. Leiden: Brill. pp. 99–120. doi:10.1163/9789004192119_006. ISBN 978-90-04-19211-9.
- Dashdondog, Bayarsaikhan (2020). Armenian Lords and Mongol Court. Conference: Armenology in Mongolia.
- Dashdondog, Bayarsaikhan (2011). The Mongols and the Armenians (1220-1335) (PDF). Brill. ISBN 978-90-04-18635-4.
- Kitagawa, Sei-ichi'. The Rise of the Artsrunisand the rl-Kha-nid Rule over Georgia. The Historical Society of Japan.
- Rayfield, Donald (2012). Edge of Empires, a History of Georgia. London: Reaktion Books. ISBN 978-1-78023-070-2.
- Salia, Kalistrat (1980). Histoire de la nation géorgienne. Paris: Édition Nino Salia.
