= Family of Demetrius II of Georgia =

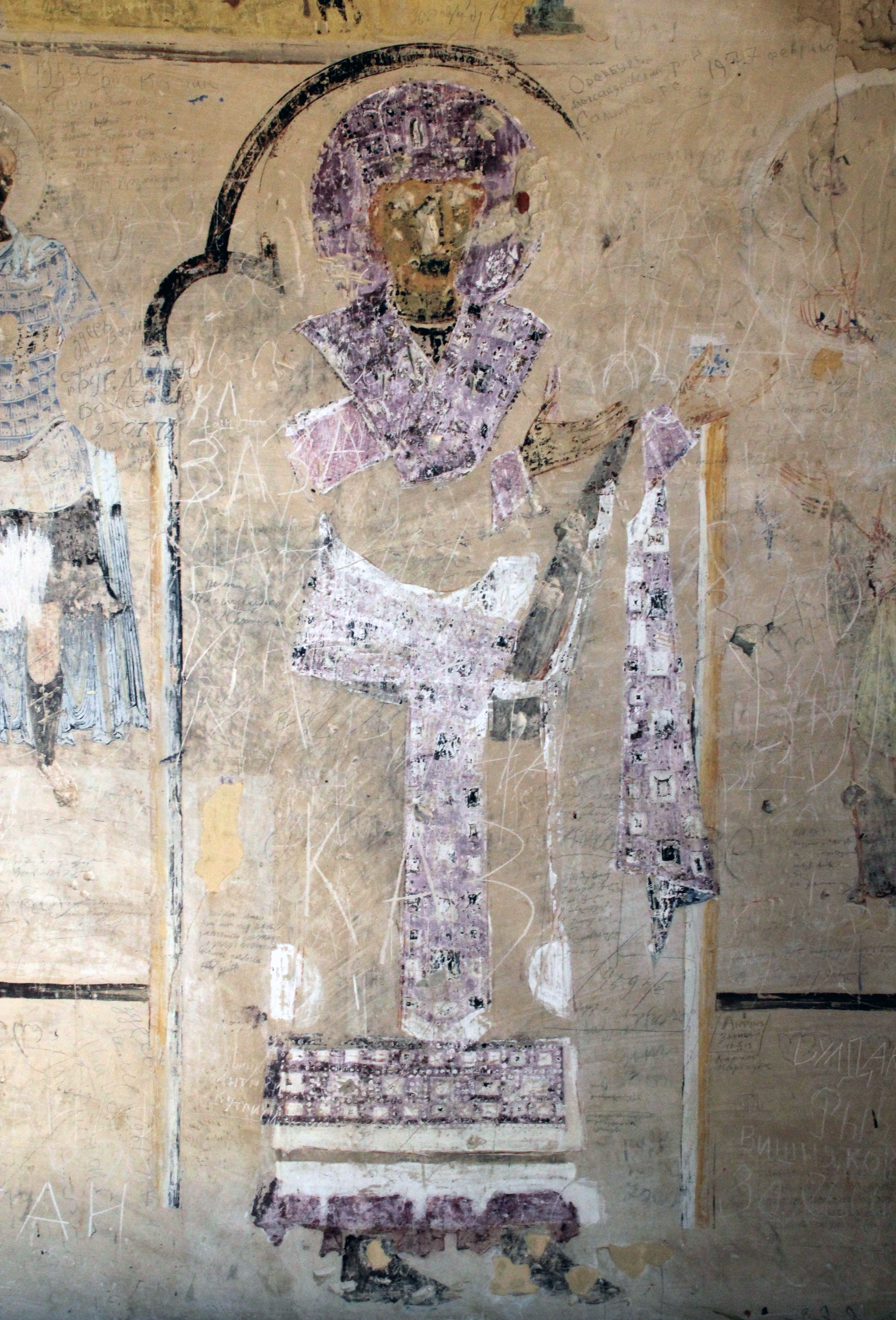
Demetrius II. A fresco from the Udabno monastery.

The family of Demetrius II of Georgia was part of the Bagrationi dynasty of the Kingdom of Georgia. Demetrius II (Demetre, or Dimitri; Georgian: დემეტრე, დიმიტრი) was a king of Georgia, reigning from 1270 until his execution by the Mongol Ilkhans in 1289. He was a son of David VII by his third wife Gvantsa Kakhaberidze. Demetrius, although a Christian, was polygamous, with three wives, and was survived by nine children, of whom three subsequently ruled as kings of Georgia.

== Parents and siblings ==
Demetrius, born in 1259, was the second son and third child of King David VII. His mother was David's third wife Gvantsa née Kakhaberidze. He was only 3 or 4 years old when Gvantsa was put to death by the Mongols as a reaction to David's abortive rebellion against the Ilkhan hegemony. David himself died in 1270.

Demetrius had an elder half-brother George, an heir apparent, who died before his father's death in 1268, and an elder half-sister Tamar, whom Demetrius subsequently married off, with great reluctance, to a son of the Mongol official Arghun-Agha. On Arghun's death, Tamar, who despised her marriage, capitalized on her husband's departure from Tbilisi and fled to the mountains of Mtiuleti. She was eventually delivered by Demetrius' powerful minister Sadun Mankaberdeli, a polygamous, who wed her through the intercession of the Ilkhan Abaqa.

== Marriages and children ==
The anonymous 14th-century Chronicle of a Hundred Years, part of the Georgian Chronicles, states that Demetrius, previously a pious Christian, allowed himself to come under the influence of the Mongol "bad habits". The young king enjoyed, to the dismay of the Georgian catholicos Nicholas III, no less than three wives, his polygamy becoming the occasion of that prelate's abdication in 1282. At the time of Demetrius' death at the hand of the Mongols in 1289, all three of his wives, as well as their children, were alive.

=== First marriage ===
The first of Demetrius' wives was a Trapezuntine princess, whom he married c. 1273–1274 or 1277. Her name and parentage are not recorded in the medieval sources. She might have been a daughter of the emperor Manuel I of Trebizond by his wife Irene Syrikaina, and was probably called Theodora or Irene. In contrast to Demetrius' other wives, she is invariably referred to by the medieval chronicler as "the queen", indicating that she enjoyed the status of the king's principal consort. By this woman, Demetrius had four sons, David VIII, Vakhtang III, Lasha, and Manuel, and a daughter named Rusudan. After Demetrius' demise, the Ilkhan Arghun assigned the valley of Skoreti near Tbilisi for the support of the Georgian queen, who kept by her her two young sons, Manuel and Lasha. In 1298, she was part of negotiations with the Mongol general Kutlushah sent by the Ilkhan Arghun against her son David VIII.

Of the children of this marriage, David VIII succeeded his cousin Vakhtang II as king of Georgia in 1292, but continued as a co-king with his younger brother Vakhtang III (r. 1302–1308) and his own son, George VI the Little (r. 1308–1318), until his death in 1310.

Manuel is known from the Georgian annals to have been involved in the mission to Kutlushah in 1298. He was married to Mamkan, a daughter of his tutor Tarsaich Orbelian, Prince of Syunik and Atabeg of Georgia, as recorded by Tarsaich's son Stepanos in his chronicle. Manuel died in 1314, without known issue.

The only daughter born of Demetrius' first marriage, Rusudan, was married off by his father to a son of his ally, the influential Mongol statesman Buqa. Rusudan appears to have survived the demise of Buqa and his family in 1289, later remarrying Taqa, a Georgian nobleman of the house of Panaskerteli. Rusudan and Taqa are known as benefactors of the Monastery of the Cross in Jerusalem. Furthermore, Rusudan is identified with the "queen of queens Rusudan" mentioned, along with the late Taqa, in an inscription from the Gudarekhi monastery.

=== Second marriage ===
Demetrius' second wife was the Mongol woman Solghar, by whom he had two sons, Baidu and Yadgar, and a daughter, Jigda. Following the death of Demetrius, she retired from Georgia, bringing Baidu and Yadgar with her to her father's home in "Tartary". Baidu then reappears in the Georgian annals as an envoy of his half-brother David VIII to the khan of the Golden Horde, Toqta, in 1298. According to one genealogical hypothesis, Jigda is the same as Jiajak, the second wife of the emperor Alexios II of Trebizond.

=== Third marriage ===
Demetrius married thirdly, c. 1280, to Natela Jaqeli, a daughter of Beka I Jaqeli, Prince of Samtskhe and Lord High Steward of Georgia. After the death of Demetrius, she returned to her father's court, where the only child of Demetrius and Natela, George V, was reared until his appointment as a co-king with his half-brother David VIII in 1299. He became regent for his nephew, George the Little, in 1308, and replaced him as king-regnant in 1318. He was to become the most famous of Demetrius' sons, earning the sobriquet "the Illustrious" for the unity and relative prosperity he brought to his country after a century of the Mongol domination.
