= Demetre of Georgia =

Demetre of Georgia may refer to:

- Demetrius I of Georgia, King in 1125–1156
- Demetrius II of Georgia, King in 1270–1289
