= David VIII =

King of Georgia (r. 1292–1311)

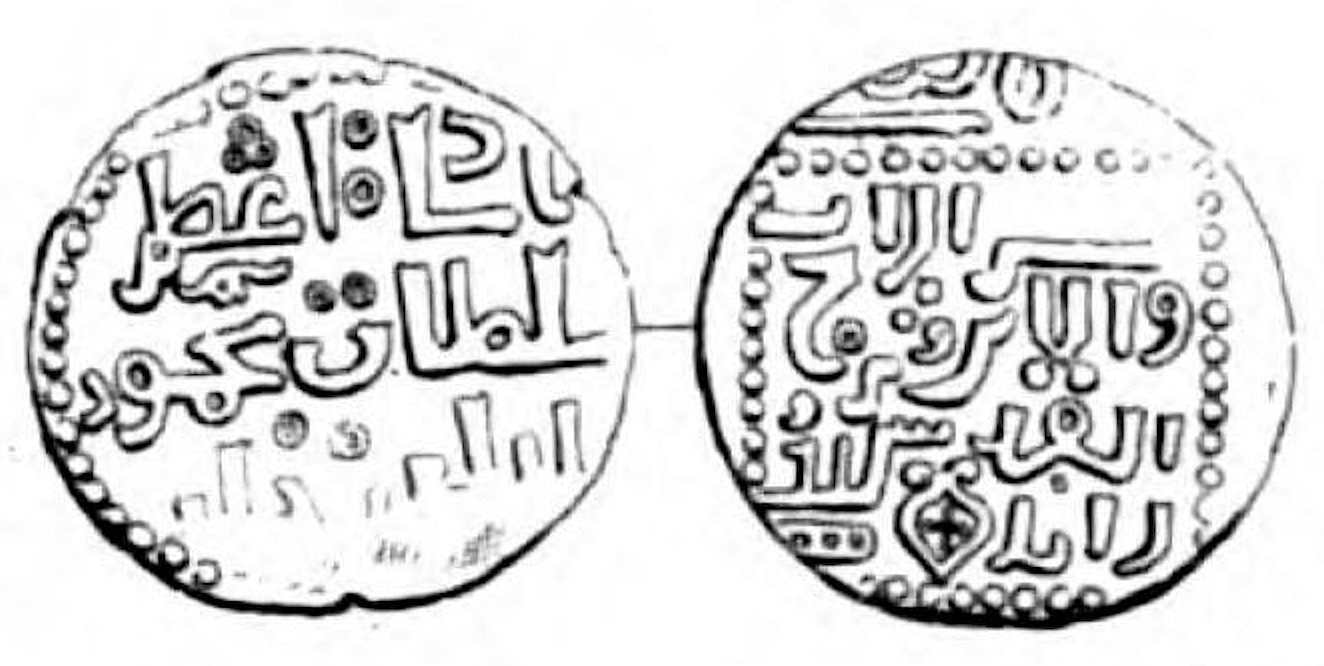
- Coinage of David VIII

King of Georgia
- Reign: 1292–1311
- Predecessor: Vakhtang II
- Successor: George VI
- Co-King: George V (1299–1302); Vakhtang III (1302–1308); George VI (1308–1311)
- Born: 1273
- Died: 1311 (aged 37–38)
- Spouse: Oljath (m. 1292; div. 1302) Daughter of Hamada Surameli (m. 1302)
- Issue: Melchizedek; Andronicus; George VI of Georgia
- Dynasty: Bagrationi
- Father: Demetrius II of Georgia
- Mother: Daughter of Manuel I of Trebizond
- Religion: Georgian Orthodox Church

David VIII (Georgian: დავით VIII; 1273–1311), from the Bagrationi dynasty, was king (mepe) of Georgia during the Mongol rule from 1292 until his death in 1311.

== Biography ==
Eldest son of Demetrius II of Georgia by his Trapezuntine wife, he was appointed by the Ilkhan ruler Gaykhatu as king of Georgia as reward for his military service during the Rümelian uprising in 1293. Succeeding his cousin Vakhtang II, David's rule actually extended only over the eastern part of the kingdom, whereas western Georgia had been under the Imeretian branch of the House of Bagrationi since 1259.

In 1295, he supported Baydu in an internal conflict in the Ilkhanate. However, Baydu was killed and Ghazan became a khan. Ghazan ordered the Georgian king to arrive to his capital Tabriz. Remembering the fate of his father, David refused to comply and began preparations for war. Ghazan Khan responded with a punitive expedition, and ravaged the country. Ossetians captured the Gori and established their Capital there. Os-Bagatar II, the king of the Ossetians, made devastating raids on Kartli and Trialeti, driving of the patrimony and aznauri. David entrenched himself in the Mtiuleti mountains and defeated a large Mongol force in a desperate guerilla fighting at Tsikare. Then, the Khan declared him deposed and appointed David's younger brother George V as king in 1299. Although backed by the Mongol forces, the power of George did not extend out of the Georgian capital Tbilisi, and the Khan replaced him by another brother, Vakhtang III, in 1302. The new king led a Mongol army against David, but could not penetrate deeply into the largely mountainous provinces held by the rebels, and a truce was negotiated. David was recognized as joint sovereign with his brother and received the princedom of Alastani in the southern province of Javakheti. He developed friendly relations with the Egyptian Mamluks, the traditional rivals of the Ilkhanate, and, mediated by Byzantium, achieved the restoration of the Monastery of the Cross in Jerusalem to the Georgian Orthodox Church in 1305.

He was succeeded by his son George VI in 1311.

== Family ==
David VIII married twice. His first marriage was to the Mongol princess Oljath, daughter of Abaqa Khan. They had two sons:

- Melchizedek the Great (died 1320), Provincial King (r. 1311–1320);
- Andronicus (died 1354), Provincial King (r. 1340–1354).

His second marriage was to an unnamed daughter of Hamada Surameli, Eristavi (Duke) of Kartli. They had one son:

- George VI the Young (1303/1304–1318), King of Georgia (r. 1308–1318).

== Coinage ==
Two types of coins issued in David's name survive, silver and copper coins, stuck in 1297 and 1310. The gap between these two periods is filled with the emissions of David's brother Vakhtang III.

== Ancestry ==
Ancestors of David VIII

8. George IV of Georgia
4. David VII of Georgia
2. Demetre II of Georgia
10. Kakhaber V Kakhaberidze, Duke of Racha
5. Gvantsa Kakhaberidze
1. David VIII of Georgia
12. Alexios I of Trebizond
6. Manuel I of Trebizond
13. Theodora Axouchina
3. Theodora Megale Komnena
7. Irene Syrikaina

David VIII Bagrationi dynasty Born: 1273 Died: 1311
Regnal titles
Preceded by Vakhtang II	King of Georgia; 1292–1308; With: Vakhtang III 1301–1307; George VI 1307–1308	Succeeded by George VI
