= Regulations of the Georgian Royal Court =

Manuscript of Regulations of the Georgian Royal Court.

Garigeba khelmts'ip'is karisa (Georgian: გარიგება ჴელმწიფის კარისა), translated into English as "Regulations of the Royal Court", "Institution of the Royal Court" or "Constitution of the Royal Court", is a medieval Georgian code of laws commonly assigned to the second reign of George V "the Brilliant" (r. 1314–1346), or to a period not far removed from it. Only part of the original text has been preserved in the form of a single 17th-century manuscript. It is an important document bearing on the structure of the Kingdom of Georgia and usefully supplements the account of the Georgian medieval court and state organization given by the early 18th-century scholar Prince Vakhushti in his description of Georgia.

What has survived of this treatise provides a systematic and minutely elucidated picture of the court, administrative machinery and social structure of the medieval Georgian state. Some clauses of the treatise are clearly based on tradition going back to the 11th and 12th centuries. Among the most important chapters are those dealing with court etiquette, including such ceremonies as the order for the coronation service, the king's dressing and robing, the serving of the royal dinner, audiences, and the celebration of major holidays and religious feast days. The duties and prerogatives of the ministers of state (viziers) are laid down, and the protocol for sessions of the Privy Council (savaziro) is set out. A chapter on the responsibilities of the amirspasalar (commander-in-chief) and his staff gives technical details on the equipment and armor supplied to the Georgian royal army.

The document was discovered and published by Ekvtime Takaishvili, Institution des cours royales, Tiflis, 1920 (Monumenta Georgica, tom. IV, no. 1). Much of the material contained in it is translated in English and incorporated in W.E.D. Allen, A History of the Georgian People, London, 1932. Another important edition is Ivane Surguladze (ed., Tbilisi, 1993), Regulations of the Royal Crown (ხელმწიფის კარის გარიგება), which includes English translation by Ketevan Surguladze.
