= George VI of Georgia =

King of Georgia from 1308 to 1318

George VI

King of Georgia
- Reign: 1308–1318
- Predecessor: Vakhtang III
- Successor: George V
- Regent: George V
- Born: 1303/4
- Died: 1318
- Dynasty: Bagrationi
- Father: David VIII
- Mother: Daughter of Hamada Surameli
- Religion: Georgian Orthodox Church

George VI the Little (Georgian: გიორგი VI მცირე, romanized: giorgi VI mtsire; 1303/4 — 1318), from the Bagrationi dynasty was the 19th king (mepe) of Georgia in 1308–1318.

== Biography ==
Son of King David VIII, he was appointed as King of Georgia (actually, only the eastern part of the country) by the Il-khan Öljaitü upon the death of his father in 1311. He reigned under the regency of his uncle George V until the later was appointed as king in 1318.

Preceded by Vakhtang III	King of Georgia; 1308–1318	Succeeded by George V
