= George V of Georgia =

King of Georgia (r. 1299–1302, 1318–1346)

George V the Brilliant გიორგი V ბრწყინვალე
- King of Kings of Georgia
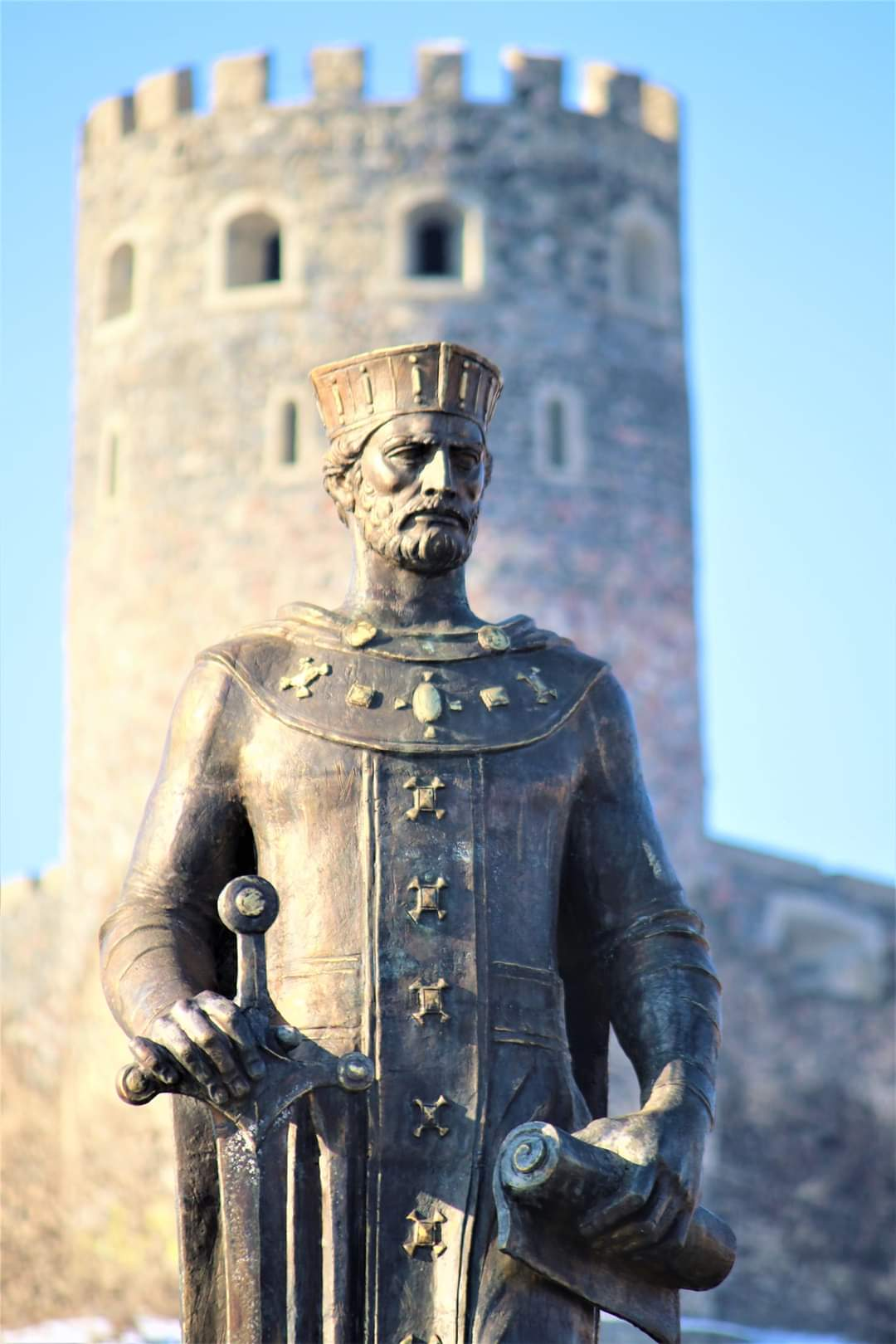
- Monument to George V in Akhaltsikhe.

King of Georgia
- 1st Reign: 1299–1302
- Predecessor: David VIII
- Successor: Vakhtang III
- Co-king: David VIII
- 2nd Reign: 1318–1346
- Predecessor: George VI
- Successor: David IX
- Born: c. 1286
- Died: 1346
- Burial: Gelati Monastery
- Issue: David IX; Soldane
- Dynasty: Bagrationi
- Father: Demetrius II of Georgia
- Mother: Natela Jaqeli
- Religion: Georgian Orthodox Church
- Khelrtva

George V the Brilliant (Georgian: გიორგი V ბრწყინვალე, romanized: giorgi V brts'q'invale; also translated as the Illustrious, or Magnificent; c. 1286–1346) of the Bagrationi dynasty, was the king (mepe) of the Kingdom of Georgia from 1299 to 1302 and again from 1318 until his death in 1346.

King George occupies a distinguished place in Georgian history. Both Georgian and foreign historians have praised him for his personality and reign. Due to his achievements and service to Georgia, the Georgian people bestowed upon him the epithet “the Brilliant.”

== Title ==
The extant document attributed to Giorgi V only encompasses the final segment of his royal title, omitting the complete formulation. Mikheil Bakhtadze suggests that the full title of King George should have been "the king of Abkhazians, Kartvelians, Ranians, Kakhetians and Armenians, Sharvansha and Shahansha, the unifier of Likht-Imer and Likht-Amer, the ruler of all the East and West." Bakhtadze also notes that the main difference between the title of King George V and previous rulers was an addition of "Likht-Imer and Likht-Amer", as the unifier of both the western and eastern halves of Georgia, as defined by the Likhi Range.

== Reign ==
Territory of Georgia during the reign of King George V.

=== Early life ===
George was born to King Demetrius II of Georgia and his third wife, Natela Jaqeli, the daughter of Beka I Jaqeli, Prince and Atabeg of Samtskhe. Demetrius was executed by the Mongols in 1289, and the little Prince George was carried and grew up in Samtskhe, at the court of his grandfather, Beka I Jaqeli.

=== First reign (1299–1302) ===
In 1299, the Ilkhanid khan Ghazan installed him as a rival ruler to George's elder brother, the rebellious Georgian King David VIII. However, George's authority did not extend beyond the Mongol-protected capital Tbilisi, so George was referred to during this period as "The Shadow King of Tbilisi". In 1302, he was replaced by his brother, Vakhtang III. After the death of both his elder brothers – David and Vakhtang – George became a regent for David's son, George VI, who died underage in 1313, allowing George V to be crowned king for a second time. Having initially pledged his loyalty to the Il-khan Öljaitü, he began a program of reuniting the Georgian lands. In 1315, he led the Georgian auxiliaries to suppress an anti-Mongol revolt in Asia Minor.

=== Second reign (1318–1346) ===
From 1318, George V started his second reign. Until 1327, he ruled from Tiflis as Viceroy and ally of the Il-Khan Abu Sa'id, collaborating with the powerful Mongol minister Chupan. In 1319 George V supported the Il-Khanate in helping crush the revolt of the Mongol commander Qurumushi, who was the military Governor of Georgia. In 1320, he drove the marauding Alans out of the town Gori and forced them back to the Caucasus Mountains.

Regulations of the Georgian Royal Court, attributed to George V's reign, codified the customs and etiquette of the royal court

==== Conflict with the Mongols ====
In 1327, Abu Sa'id Bahadur Khan investigated and executed his guardian and de facto governor of Qa'ena, Chupan, with his sons and supporters. The death of a powerful government hastened the further decline and disintegration of the Ilkhanate. The young and weak politician Abu Sa'id could not stop the decline of the state. In 1335, after his death, complete chaos began in the country, and in fact, Ilkhanate was divided into several neighboring states.

King George was on friendly terms with the influential Mongol prince Choban. George used Choban's death as a pretext to rebel against the already weakened Ilkhanate. He stopped paying tribute to the Mongols and expelled their army from the country. It was a long process that lasted from 1327 to 1335, through both peaceful diplomacy and the use of force. In the 30s and 40s of the 14th century, the Mongols organized several campaigns in order to restore their domination in Eastern Georgia, albeit with no success.

However, according to the numismatic evidence, Georges V may not have been that successful in asserting independence. Standard Il-Khanid coins continued to be minted in Tiflis until the 1350s, and no coins in the name of George V are known, suggesting continued effective control by the Mongols throughout the period. It is suggested that George lost his capital Tiflis and most of Eastern Georgia, but managed to reunite the western part of the country under his rule.

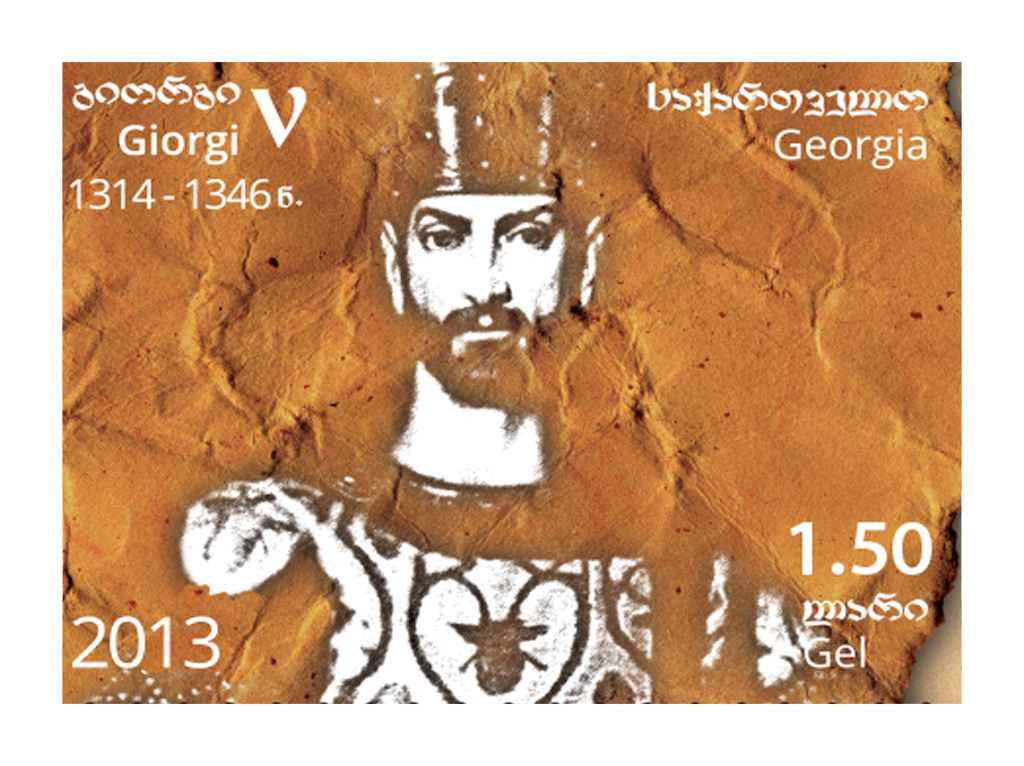
Depiction of George V on the commemorative Georgian postage stamp from 2013

==== Unification of Georgia ====
From the moment he became king, one of the main concerns of the king was to restore the unity of Georgia. After the death of David Narin in Western Georgia, Constantine I's own brother, Michael, rebelled. The fight between the brothers sometimes ended with a short truce, and sometimes it continued. In 1327, Constantine died and Michael took the throne, but two years later he also died. Michael was left with a young son, Bagrat, who was not supported by the princes. George took advantage of this, contacted the nobles of Imereti, moved to Western Georgia in agreement with them and captured all the castles and cities. Bagrat was fortified in Kutaisi with a small number of supporters, but when George's army approached the city, Bagrat surrendered to the king, in exchange for which he received a promise of inviolability and the nobility of Shorapani. In Kutaisi the Dadiani, Gurieli, Abkhazian and Svan nobles presented King George with great gifts and expressed their obedience. Then the king himself traveled to Mingrelia, Abkhazia and Guria and settled the affairs there.

George V managed to incorporate Samtskhe peacefully. In 1334, when his uncle Sargis II Jaqeli, Prince of Samtskhe, died, the king came to Samtskhe and confirmed Sargis's son, Qvarqvare, as the Prince of Samtskhe. This fact meant the restoration of the king's supremacy on Samtskhe and its return to Georgia. With this act, George V essentially completed the process of reunification of Georgia.

==== Domestic policy ====
Having restored the kingdom's unity, he focused now on cultural, social and economic projects. He changed the coins issued by Ghazan khan with the Georgian ones, called George's tetri. Between 1325 and 1338, he worked out two major law codes, one regulating the relations at the royal court and the other devised for the peace of a remote and disorderly mountainous district.

==== Foreign policy ====
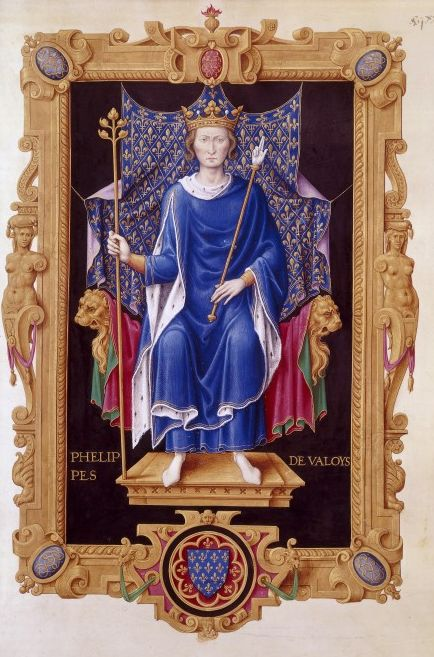
Correspondence with Philip VI of France reveals George's disappointment with lack of firm Western commitment and an offer to again participate in the Crusades.

Under him, Georgia established close international commercial ties, mainly with the Byzantine Empire, but also with the great European maritime republics, Genoa and Venice. During his reign, Armenian lands, including Ani, were part of the Kingdom of Georgia.

George V also extended diplomatic relations to the Bahri Mamluks of Egypt, achieving the restoration of several Georgian monasteries in Palestine to the Georgian Orthodox Church and gaining free passage for Georgian pilgrims to the Holy Land. According to Kldiashvili (1997), the introduction of the Jerusalem cross, taken as the inspiration for the modern national flag of Georgia in the 1990s, might date to the reign of George V.

In the 1330s, George secured the southwestern province of Klarjeti against the advancing Osmanli tribesmen led by Orhan I. In 1341 he interfered in the power struggle in the neighbouring Empire of Trebizond and supported Anna Anachoutlou who ascended the throne with the help of the Laz, only to be put to death a year later. He also organized a successful campaign against Shirvan, a neighboring state of Georgia.

George V had friendly relations with King Philip VI of France, as evidenced by the correspondence between them. George V wrote to the King of France that he was ready to participate with him in the liberation of the "Holy Lands" of Syria-Palestine, and had 30,000 soldiers. He wrote:

Domini reges Franciae frequenter reges orientales commoverunt contra Saracenos, postea non venientes eos dimittebant in tribulatione guerrae; sed dicatis sibi, quod, quando mare transiverit, statim me videbit ad suum beneplacitum cum XXX millibus armatorum.
“French kings often call on Eastern kings to fight against the Saracen (Muslims), but then usually fail to fulfill their promise and leave their allies on the battle field to face the enemy alone. Correspondingly, inform me when you intend to cross the sea and I along with my 30,000 soldiers will immediately meet you as you arrive.“ Letter from George V to Philip VI of France, 1332-33.

=== Coinage ===
No coinage that is undisputably attributed to George V has been discovered. A number of medieval legal documents do refer to a "Giorgauli" (i.e. Georgian) coin and there exist a few examples, discovered in a 14th century hoard and attributed by David Georgievich Kapanadze to George V. However, Kapanadze's reproductions were not good enough to make a clear impression, leading some numismatists to express reservations regarding the attribution of these coins to George V.

During various stages of George V's reign, he did not have full control over coinage being minted on the entirety of what was historically Georgian territory. At least in some eastern parts of Georgia, such as Tiflis and Kakheti, mints continued to make coins of the Mongol Ilkhanate, mainly dirhams. This led to some scholars of Mongolian history to assess that George V had not fully liberated the entirety of Georgia and that the eastern provinces remained under the Mongol control of the Ilkhanate during the mid-14th century.

=== Death and inheritance ===
George V died in 1346. He was succeeded by his only son, David IX. He was buried at the Gelati Monastery near Kutaisi, western Georgia. At the time of his death, the Il-khanate was much weakened, Mongol rule being in the hands of the Chupanid Malik Ashraf who had installed in Tabriz a puppet ruler in the name of Anushirvan Khan, but still ruling on Central Iran, Azerbaijan, Armenia, and Eastern Georgia.

Actually very few accounts remain from the reign George V, mainly due to the Black Death which ravaged Georgia from 1346–48, and due to the destruction of monastic libraries by Timur from 1386. The biography in circulation today mainly derives from the 18th century reconstruction by the monk Egnatashvili, secretary to the Historical Commission established by King Vakhtang VI, who recognized "that he had been unable to find any authentic contemporary life of King Giorgi V".

== Marriage and children ==
The identity of his wife is not known. The "Georgian Chronicle" of the 18th century reports George V marrying a daughter of "the Greek Emperor, Lord Michael Komnenos". However the reigning dynasty of the Byzantine Empire in the 14th century were the Palaiologoi, not the Komnenoi. The marriage of a daughter of Michael IX Palaiologos and his wife Rita of Armenia to a Georgian ruler is not recorded in Byzantine sources. Neither is the existence of any illegitimate daughters of Michael IX. The Komnenoi did rule however in the Empire of Trebizond. A Michael Komnenos was Emperor from 1344 to 1349, but his only attested child was John III of Trebizond; whether John III had siblings is unknown. He had a son David IX of Georgia and a daughter Soldane who married John of Poitiers-Lusignan.

== Bibliography ==
- Kekelia, Vladimir (2015). საქართველოს ილუსტრირებული ისტორია, ტ. 10 — გიორგი ბრწყინვალე [Illustrated history of Georgia, Vol. 10 - George the Magnificent] (in Georgian). Tbilisi: Palette. ISBN 978-9941-21-759-3.
- Lortkipanidze, Mariam; Japaridze, Otar; Muskhelishvili, David; Metreveli, Roin (2012). History of Georgia in four volumes, vol. II - History of Georgia from the 4th century to the 13th century. Tbilisi: National Academy of Sciences of Georgia. ISBN 978-9941-19-585-3.
- Runciman, Steven (1999). A History of the Crusades. Vol. III: The Kingdom of Acre and the Later Crusades. Cambridge University Press.
- George V the Brilliant (In Georgian)
- Ronald Grigor Suny, The Making of the Georgian Nation: 2nd edition (December 1994), Indiana University Press, ISBN 0-253-20915-3, page 44
- Lang, D. M. (1955). "Georgia in the Reign of Giorgi the Brilliant (1314-1346)". Bulletin of the School of Oriental and African Studies, University of London. 17 (1): 74–91. doi:10.1017/S0041977X00106354. ISSN 0041-977X. JSTOR 609230.

| Preceded by David VIII | King of Georgia (first rule); 1299–1302 | Succeeded by Vakhtang III |
| Preceded by George VI | King of Georgia (second rule); 1318–1346 | Succeeded by David IX |
