= Demetrius II of Georgia =

King of Georgia from 1270 to 1289

Demetrius II დემეტრე II
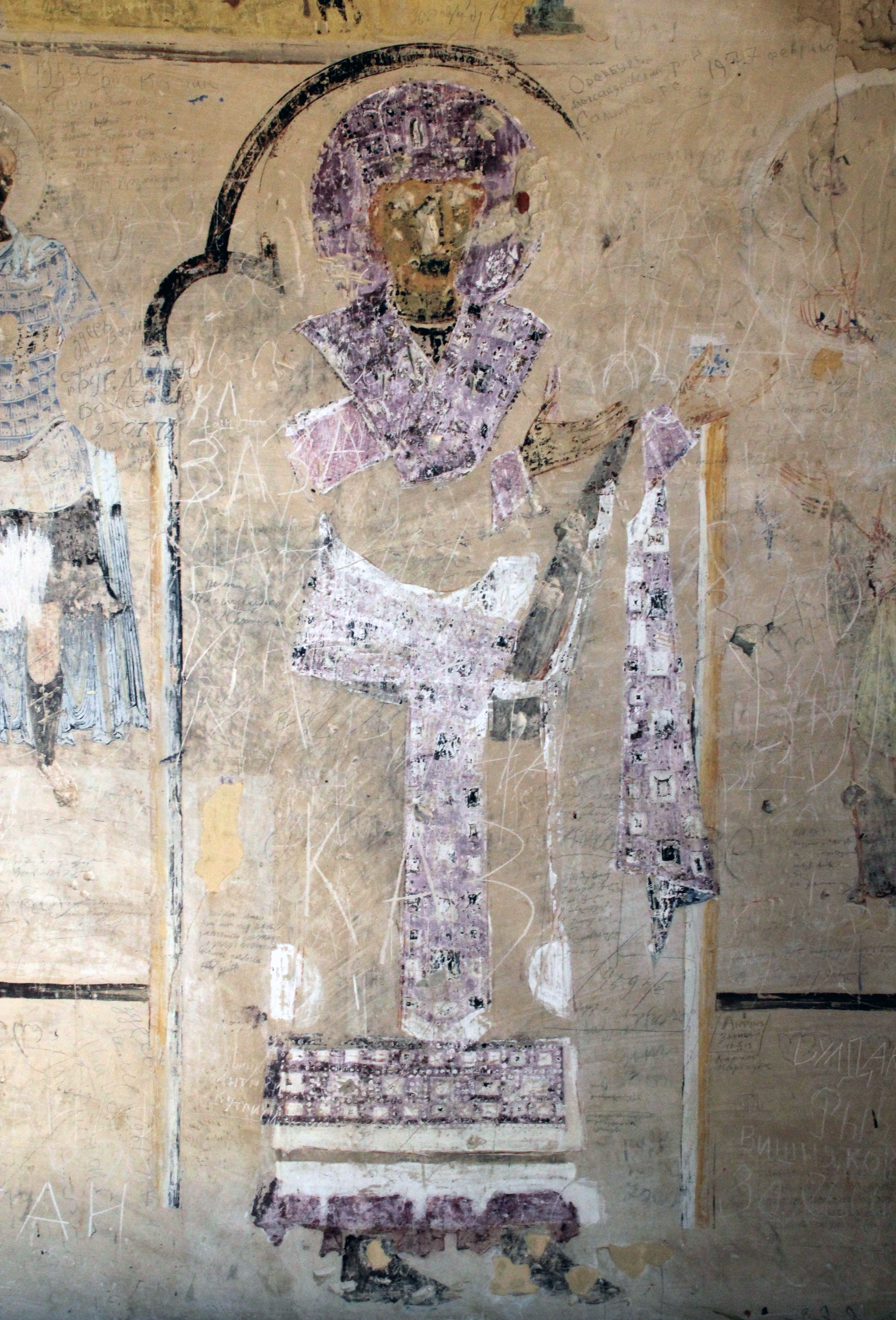
- A fresco of Demetrius II from the Udabno monastery.

King of Georgia
- Reign: 1270–1289
- Coronation: 1271; Svetitskhoveli Cathedral
- Predecessor: David VII
- Successor: Vakhtang II
- Born: 1259
- Died: 12 March 1289 (aged 29–30); Movakani
- Burial: Svetitskhoveli Cathedral, Mtskheta
- Spouse: Megale Komnena; Solghar; Natela Jaqeli
- Issue Among others: David VIII; Vakhtang III; Princess Rusudan; George V of Georgia
Names
- Demetrius II the Self-Sacrificer
- Dynasty: Bagrationi
- Father: David VII
- Mother: Gvantsa Kakhaberidze
- Religion: Georgian Orthodox Church

Demetrius II the Self-Sacrificer or the Devoted (Georgian: დემეტრე II თავდადებული, romanized: demet're II tavdadebuli) (1259–12 March 1289) of the Bagrationi dynasty, was king (mepe) of Eastern Georgia reigning from 1270 until his execution by the Mongol Ilkhans in 1289.

== Early life ==
Demetrius, born in 1259, was the second son and third child of King David VII of Georgia. His mother was David's third wife Gvantsa née Kakhaberidze. He was 2 years old when Gvantsa was put to death by the Mongols as a reaction to David's abortive rebellion against the Ilkhan hegemony. David himself died in 1270.

Demetrius had an elder half-brother George, an heir apparent, who died before his father's death in 1268, and an elder half-sister Tamar, whom Demetrius subsequently married off, with great reluctance, to a son of the Mongol official Arghun-Agha.

== Reign ==
He succeeded on his father's death in 1270, when he was 11 years old. He ruled for some time under the regency of Sadun Mankaberdeli, the Atabeg and Amirspasalar designated by the Mongols. It is for this reason that upon the death of Sadun in 1282, Demetrius refused the post of atabeg to his son Khutlubuga and made him a sworn enemy.

Although he continued to be titled "king of Georgians and Abkhazians, etc", Demetrius's rule extended only over the eastern part of the kingdom. Western Georgia was in the hands of the descendants of David VI Narin who proclaimed themselves kings of western Georgia, while the province of Samtskhe, governed by the independent prince Beka I Jaqeli, was directly subject to the Mongols.

Demetrius also participated in the Mongol campaigns in the Middle East against the Mamluks of Egypt and particularly distinguished himself with Beka I Jaqeli at the head of a Georgian army of 15,000 men under the orders of Möngke Temür, brother of Abaqa Khan, during the Second Battle of Homs in 1281. Despite the defeat of the Mongol troops, the Georgians reported significant spoils.

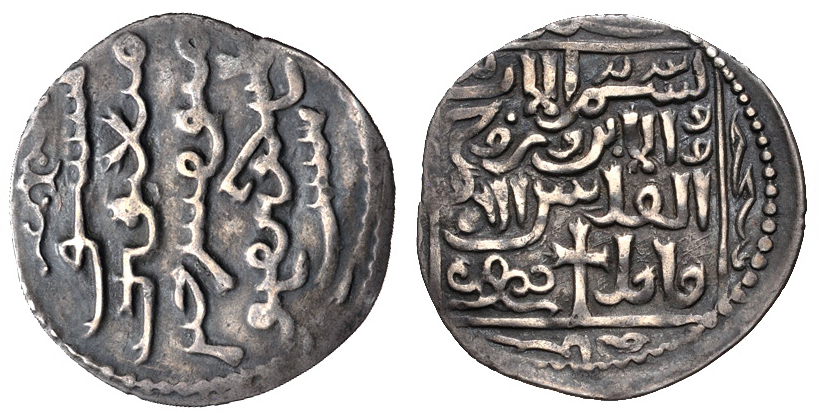
Georgian coin of Abaqa during the rule of Demetrius II, with Chritian cross. Tiflis mint, 1281–1286.

Demetrius behaved like a loyal subject of the Ilkhan; he was a supporter of Tekuder (1282-1284), a Mongol converted to Islam, then of Arghun (1284-1291), brought to the throne in reaction by traditional Mongol Buddhist or Nestorian leaders. He developed friendly relations with the Mongolian nobility. Although he was already married to a Greek princess of Trebizond, he took the Mongolian princess Solghar as his second wife.

In 1288, on the order of Arghun, he subdued the rebel province of Derbent, near the Caspian Sea. The same year, Arghun revealed a plot organized by his powerful minister Buqa, whose son was married to Demetrius's daughter. Bugha and his family were massacred, and the Georgian king, suspected to have been involved in the plot, was ordered to ride to the Mongol capital, lest Arghun threaten to invade Georgia. Despite much advice from nobles, Demetrius headed for the Khan's residence to face apparent death, and was imprisoned there. He was beheaded at Movakan on 12 March 1289. He was buried at Mtskheta, Georgia, and canonized by the Georgian Orthodox Church.

He was succeeded by his cousin Vakhtang II.

== Marriages and children ==
Demetrius II was married three times. His first wife was an unnamed Trapezuntine princess, probably a daughter of Emperor Manuel I of Trebizond. They had four sons and one daughter:

- David VIII (1273–1311), King of Georgia (r. 1292–1311);
- Vakhtang III (1275–1308), King of Georgia (r. 1298, 1302–1308);
- Prince Manuel, who married Mamkan (died c. 1314), daughter of Tarsaich Orbelian;
- Prince Lasha;
- Princess Rusudan, who was first married to a son of Buqa and later to Taqa Panaskerteli.

His second wife was Solghar, a Mongolian. They had two sons and one daughter:

- Prince Baadur;
- Prince Iadgar;
- Princess Jigda-Khatun.

His third wife was Natela, daughter of Beka I Jaqeli. They had one son:

- George V of Georgia (died 1346), King of Georgia (r. 1299, 1318–1346).

== Bibliography ==
- Toumanoff, Cyrille (1976). Manuel de Généalogie et de Chronologie pour l'histoire de la Caucasie chrétienne (Arménie, Géorgie, Albanie) [Manual of Genealogy and Chronology of Christian Caucasian History (Armenia, Georgia, Albania)] (in French). Rome: Edizioni Aquila.
- Metreveli, Roin, ed. (2008). "„ასწლოვანი მატიანე"" [Chronicle of A Hundred Years] (PDF). ქართლის ცხოვრება [Kartlis Tskhovreba] (in Georgian). Tbilisi: Artanuji. Archived from the original (PDF) on 1 April 2012.

Preceded by David VII	King of Georgia; 1270–1289	Succeeded by Vakhtang II
