= Vakhtang III =

King of Georgia from 1302 to 1308

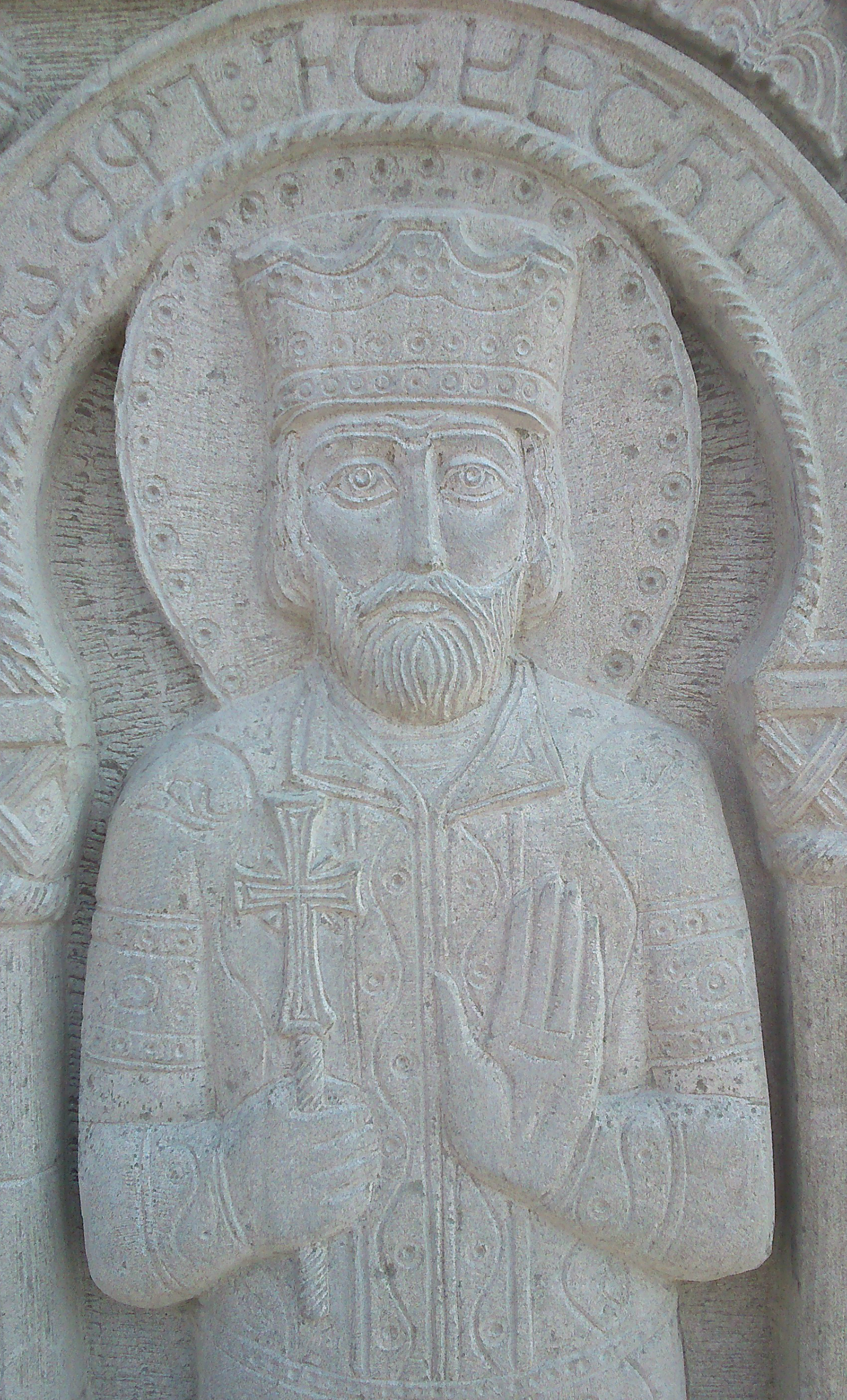
- Relief of King Vakhtang III

King of Georgia
- Reign: 1302–1308
- Predecessor: George V David VIII
- Successor: David VIII
- Born: 1275
- Died: 1308 (aged 32–33)
- Burial: Dmanisi Sioni cathedral
- Spouse: Ripsime
- Issue: Demetrius; George
- Dynasty: Bagrationi dynasty
- Father: Demetre II of Georgia
- Religion: Georgian Orthodox Church

Vakhtang III (Georgian: ვახტანგ III; 1275–1308), of the Bagrationi dynasty, was the king (mepe) of Georgia from 1302 to 1308. He ruled during the Mongol dominance of Georgia.

A son of Demetrius II of Georgia by his Trapezuntine wife, Vakhtang was appointed, in 1302, by the Ilkhan Ghazan as a rival king to his brother David VIII, who had revolted against the Mongol rule. Vakhtang, however, controlled only the Georgian capital of Tbilisi and parts of the southern and eastern provinces of the kingdom. After an unsuccessful offensive against David's guerrillas, the brothers agreed to rule the kingdom jointly. However, Vakhtang was destined to spend most of his reign as a commander of the Georgian and Armenian auxiliaries in endless Mongol campaigns, particularly against Damascus (1303) and Gilan (1304).

== Family ==
Vakhtang III married Ripsime. The 18th-century Georgian Chronicle mentions her as a niece of Shabur. They had two known sons:

- Demetrius, ruler of Dmanisi.
- George, ruler of Samshvilde.

Preceded by David VIII	King of Georgia; 1302–1308	Succeeded by David VIII
