= Zakharyan =

Zakharyan is a surname. Notable people with the surname include:

- Arsen Zakharyan (born 2003), Russian football player
- Vanik Zakharyan (1936–2023), Armenian academic
- Yervand Zakharyan (born 1946), Armenian politician

The rulers of the Zakarid dynasty were known as Zakarians. They include:

- Avag Zakarian
- Avag-Sargis III Zakarian
- Ivane I Zakarian
- Ivane II Zakarian
- Khoshak Zakarian
- Khosrov Zakarian
- Sargis Zakarian
- Shahnshah Zakarian
- Shahnshah II Zakarian
- Tamta Mkhargrdzeli, or Tamta Zakarian
- Zakare I Zakarian
- Zakare II Zakarian
- Zakare III Zakarian
