= Hmayak =

Hmayak is an Armenian given name. Notable people with the name include:

- Hmayak Siras, Armenian writer, editor and translator
- Hmayak Babayan, Armenian Red Army major general
- Hmayak Sahaki Grigoryan, Armenian poet and translator
