= Taki ad-Din Tmogveli =

13th century Georgian noble and a commander of Tamar's army

- Ruler of Tmogvi
- Noble family: Mkhargrdzeli
- Father: Sargis Tmogveli

Taki ad-Din Tmogveli (Georgian: თაყაიდინ თმოგველი) was a 13th century Georgian noble and one of the commanders of Tamar's army. He belonged to the Tmogveli branch of the powerful Mkhargrdzeli family and owned estates in Tmogvi. He participated in battle of Basian in 1203 and raids into northern Iran in 1210, where he commanded detachment of five hundred horsemen against Marandian forces.
