= Tejharuyk Monastery =

Monastery in Meghradzor, Armenia

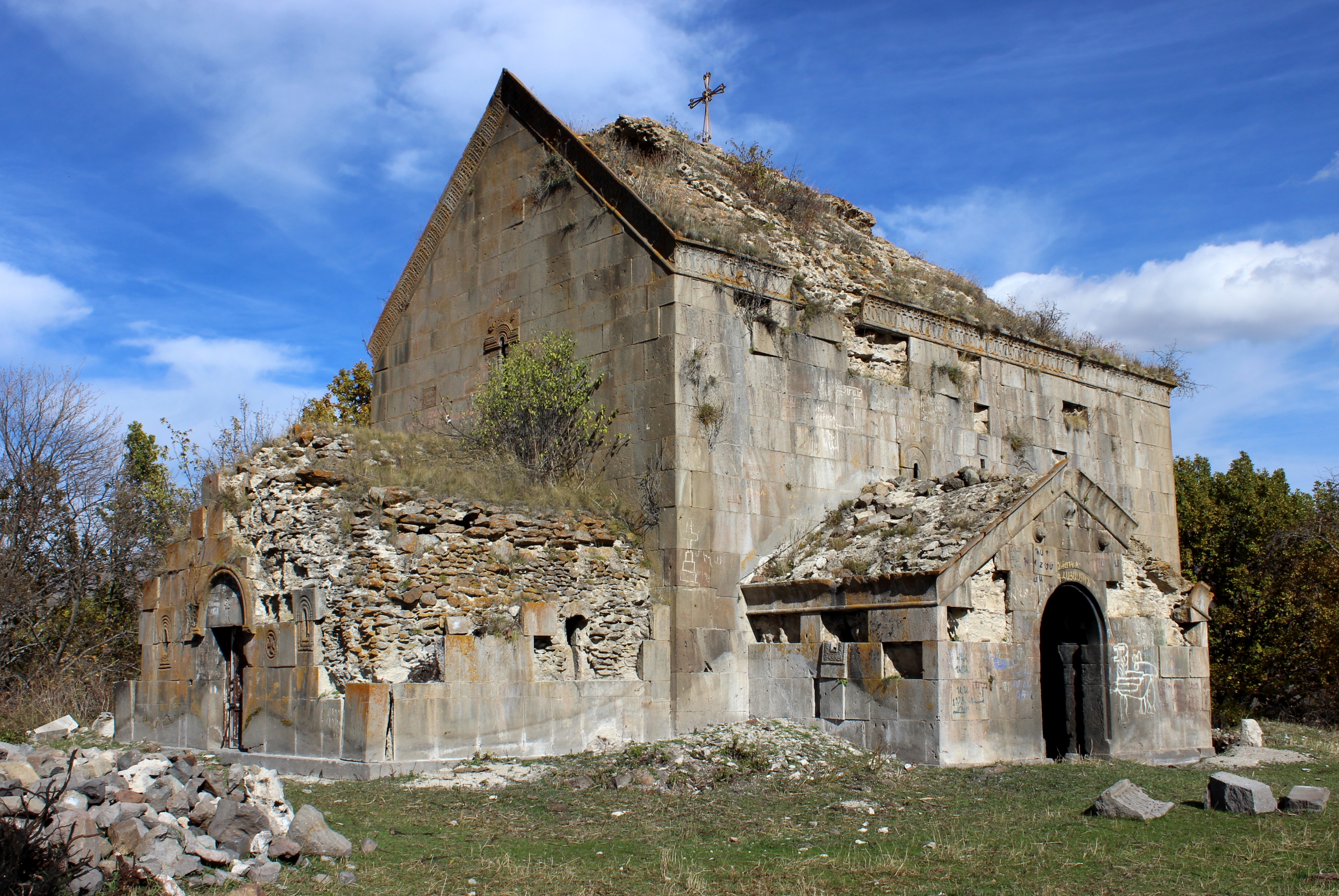
- Tejharuyk Monastery, October 2014

- Location within Armenia

Religion
- Affiliation: Armenian Apostolic Church
- Region: Caucasus
- Status: Inactive, ruins

Location
- Location: Meghradzor, Kotayk Province, Armenia
- Coordinates: 40.597816°N 44.644806°E

Architecture
- Type: Monastery
- Style: Armenian
- Groundbreaking: 1196
- Completed: 1196-99

Tejharuyk (Armenian: Թեժառույք) is a 12th-century walled Armenian monastery located upon a wooded hill just southwest of the village of Meghradzor in the Kotayk Province of Armenia. It was constructed between 1196–99 and commissioned by Ivane I Zakarian, a commander of the Armeno-Georgian Zakarian-Mkhargrzeli family, who was a convert to the Georgian Orthodox Church. His vassal, Prince Bubak, and the latter's heirs are buried in the gavit of the church.

== Architecture ==
The monastery of Tejharuyk is enclosed by a low stone wall that currently surrounds only sections of the complex. The basilica is the only relatively intact structure on the grounds and consists of a main hall, gavit, side chapel, and portico that leads into the church. The gavit is a small vaulted chamber, with open rooms adjacent to either side. Steps lead up to a portal that is adorned with decorations of grapes and vines in high-relief around the frame. The tympanum above the door, which may have once held an inscription, fresco, or other form of decoration, is now worn beyond recognition. Although, some of the original white plaster is still preserved around the lintel. Beyond the gavit is the main hall of the church; a large vaulted chamber that is relatively unadorned. Capitals of the six columns in high-relief are of interest since each contains a unique design. One in particular holds an image of a church with a drum and dome resting above (left), a cross standing on a stepped plinth (middle), and an individual (separated from the church and cross in a separate "scene") wearing a long tunic, with both arms bent and pointed in the upward direction (right). The large apse has four small niches at the lower level, and a larger niche/chamber to the right. There is another niche to the left of the altar, and to the left in the main hall of the church is a small attached chapel/prayer room. A second entry leads into the basilica from the exterior through the portico. There is some unique decorative relief around the frame of the portal. The exterior of the portico has a high-relief carving of a bird perched on its surrounding frame. The same imagery is visible again above the window to the apse, where there are two birds perched side-by-side on the rectangular frame that surrounds them. Georgian inscriptions in large script can be seen surrounding the walls of the basilica, especially below the decorative molding under the eaves of the roof.

There are still visible depressions that can be found surrounding the church where other monastic buildings had once stood. A few meters from the church are the lower walls of a small chapel, consisting of a single room with an apse. Excavations are currently underway (as of October 2014), where current soil levels have been removed to reveal the original foundations of the church. Sadly, much of the building's interior and exterior has been defaced by graffiti in recent years.

== Gallery ==
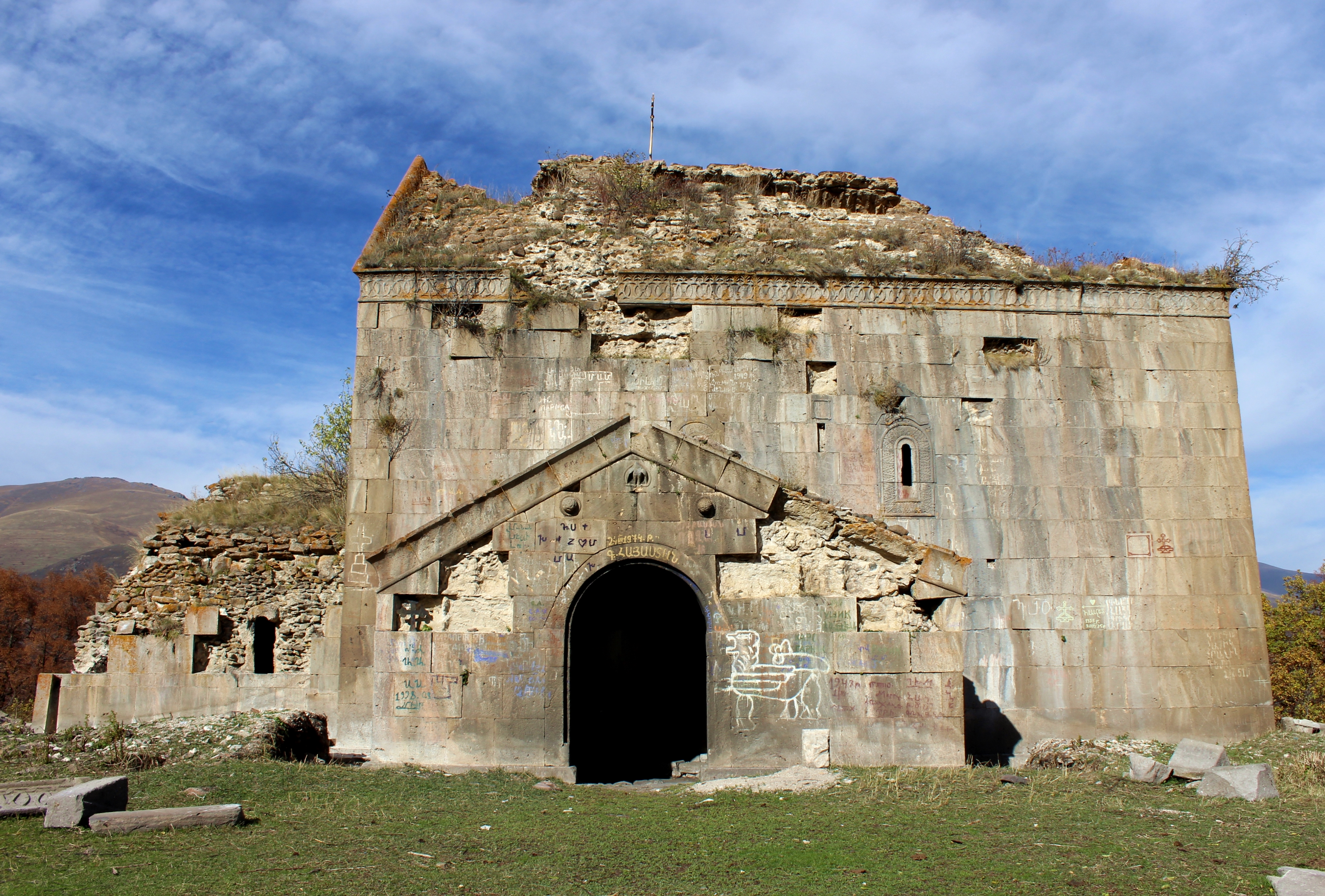
Tejharuyk Monastery, side view

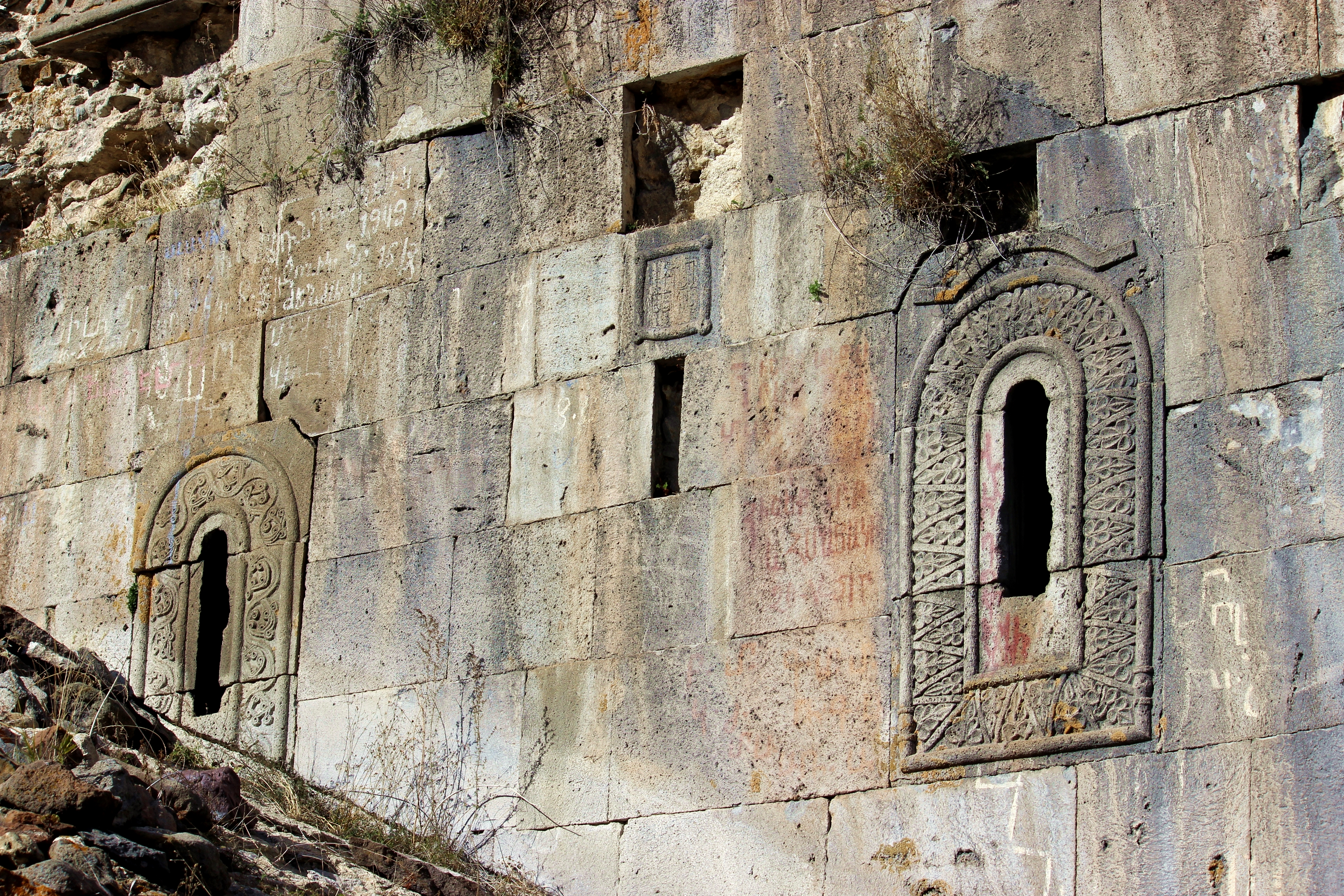
Decorative windows to the basilica.

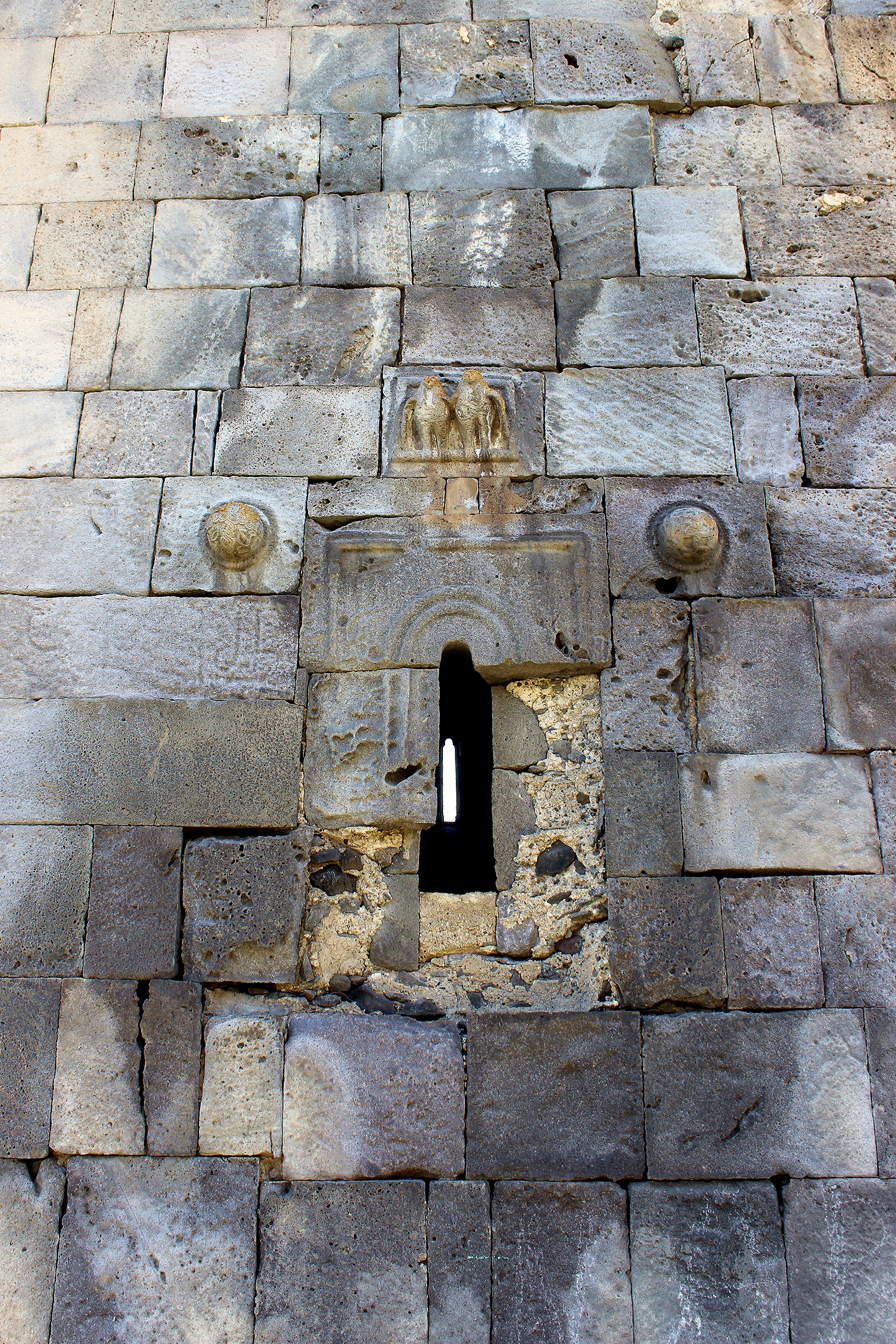
High-relief decoration of two birds perched on their surrounding frame (above window to apse).

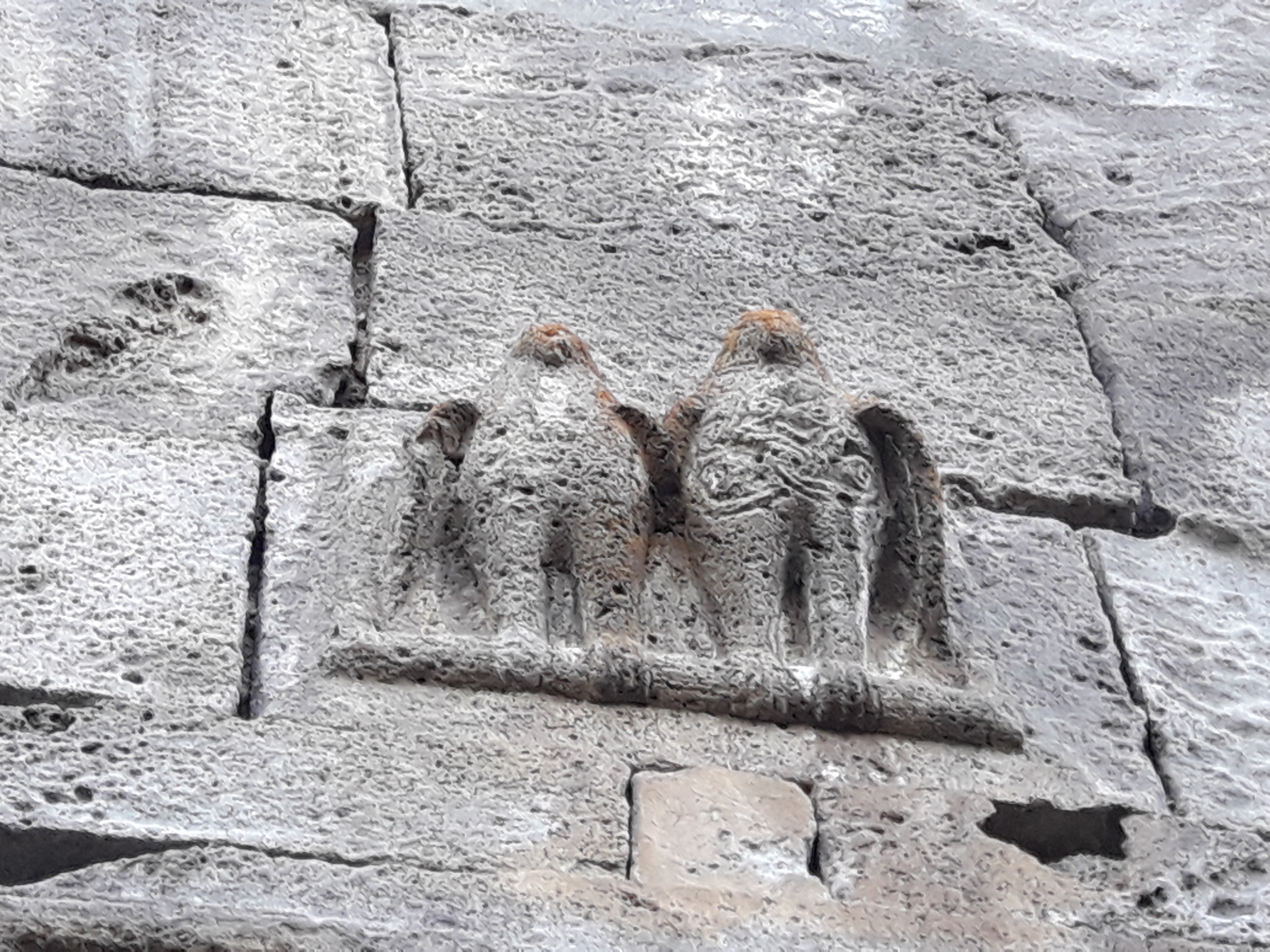

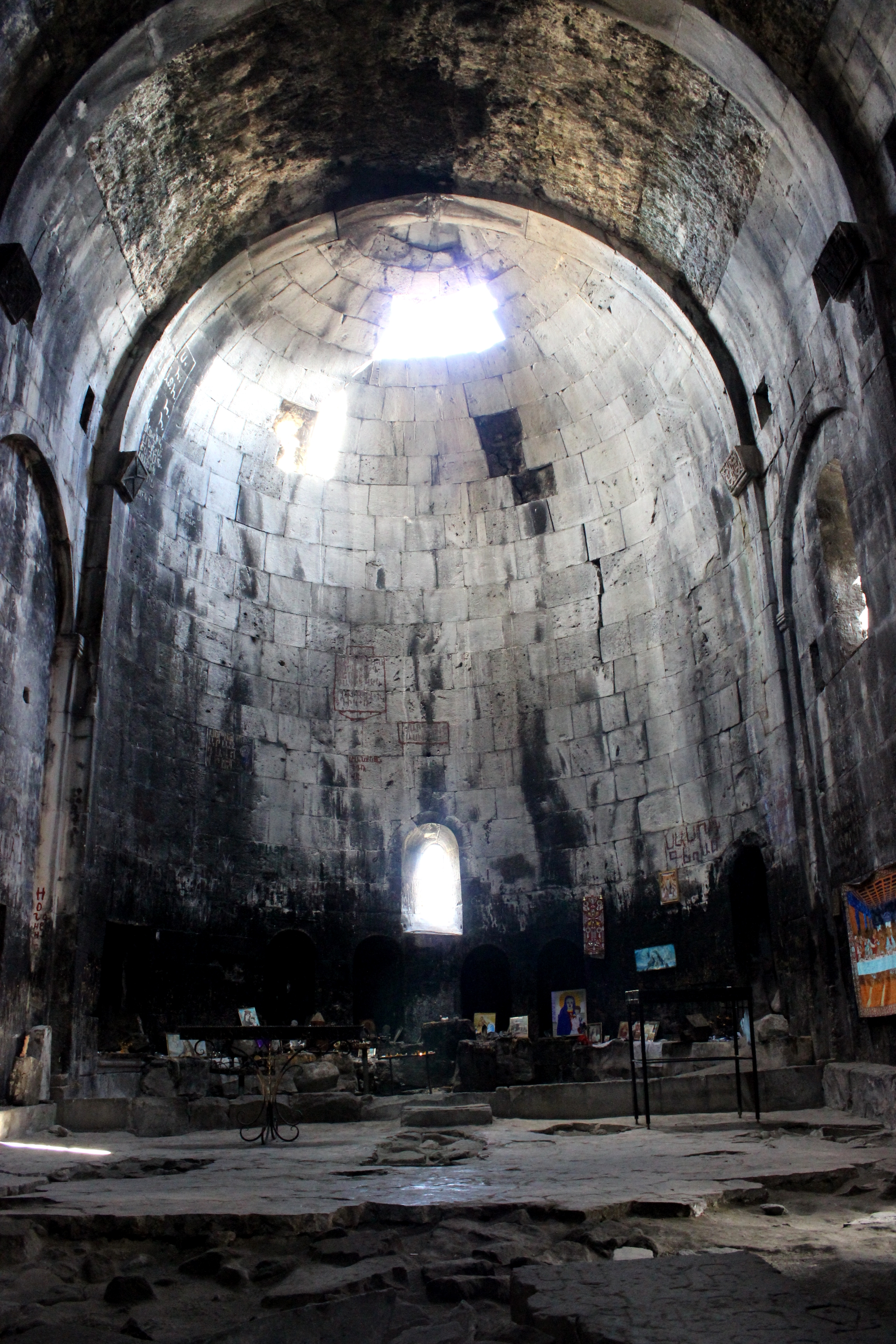
Church interior (view towards apse)

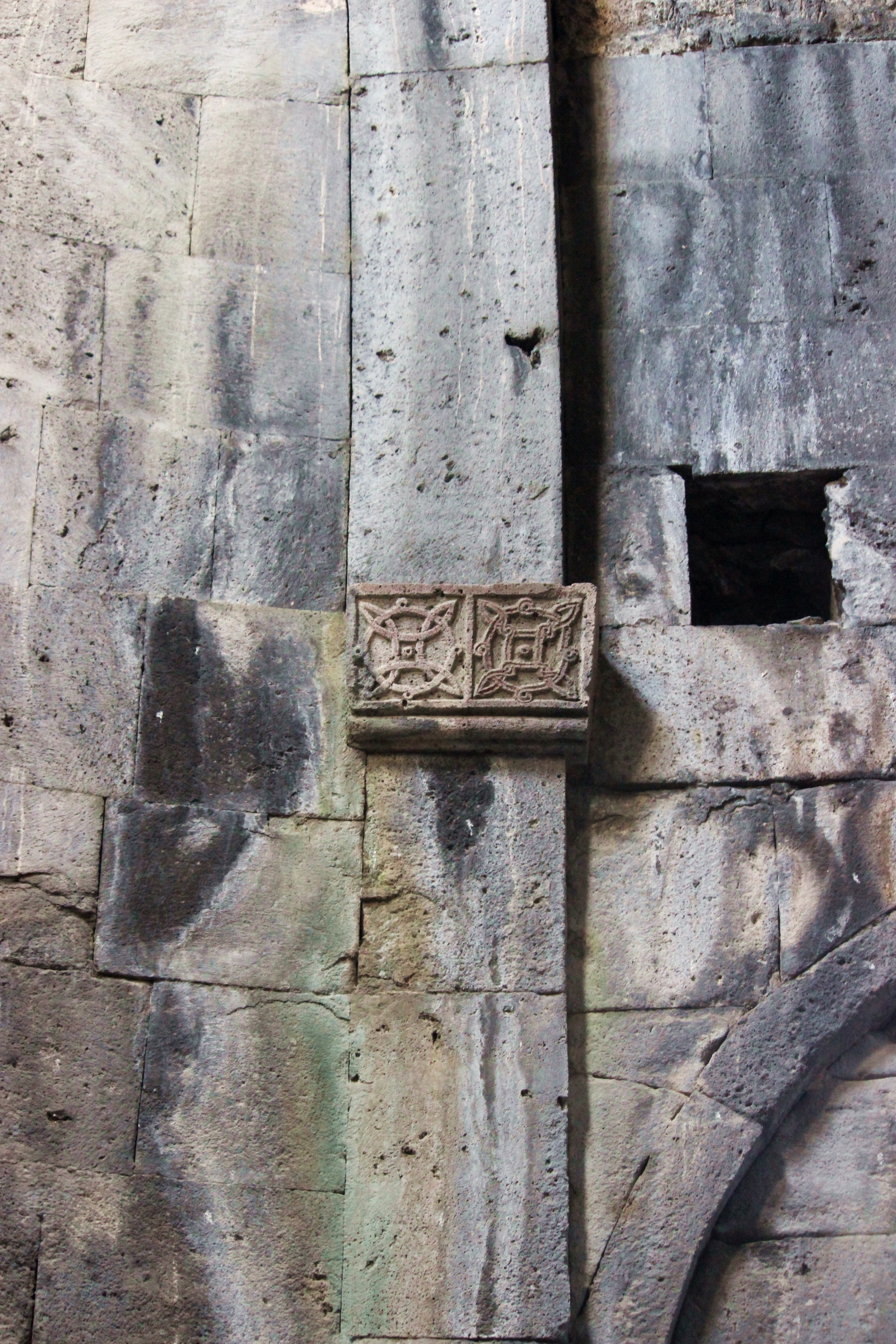
Decorative capital (right of the apse, church interior)

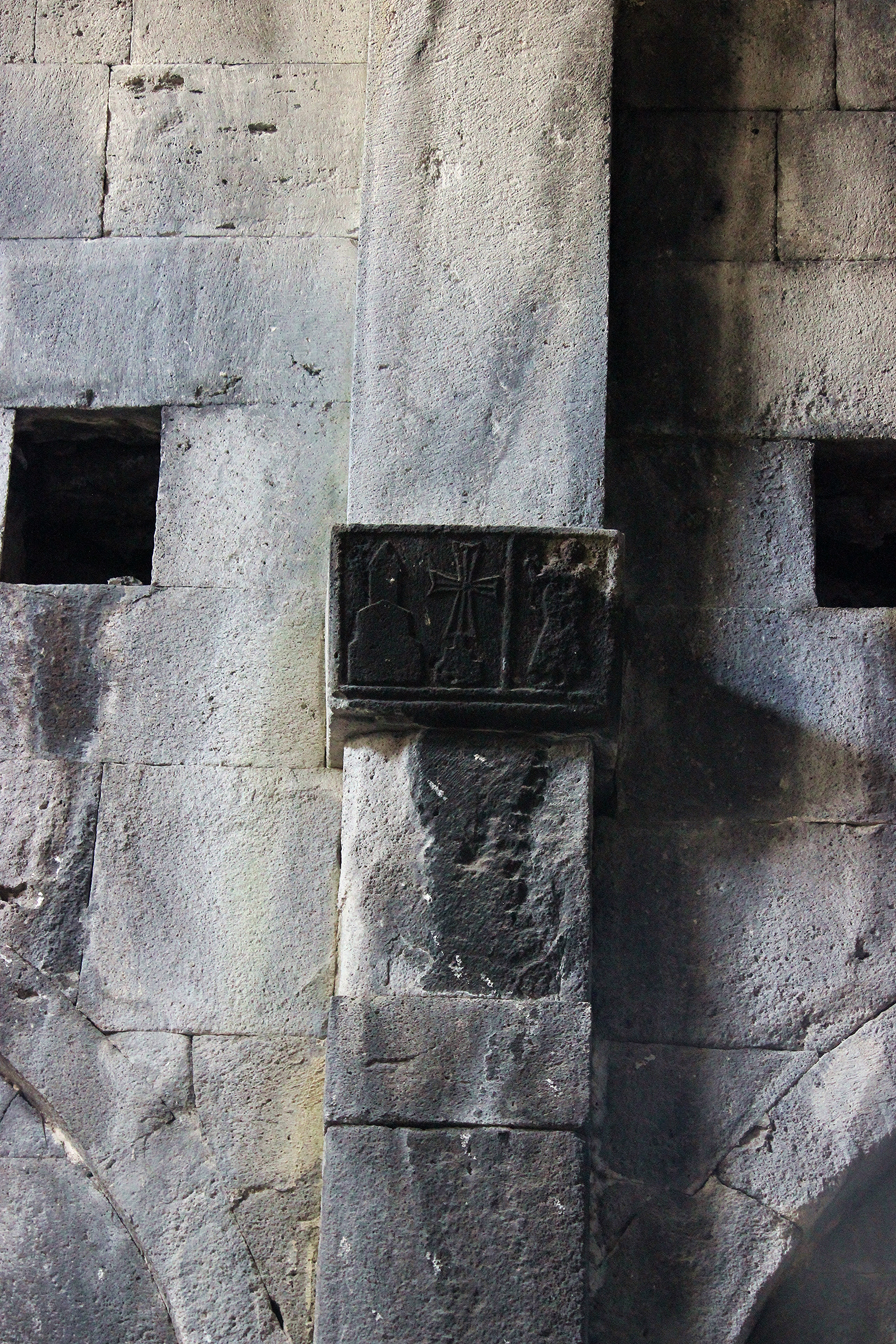
Decorative capital (right of the apse, middle, church interior)

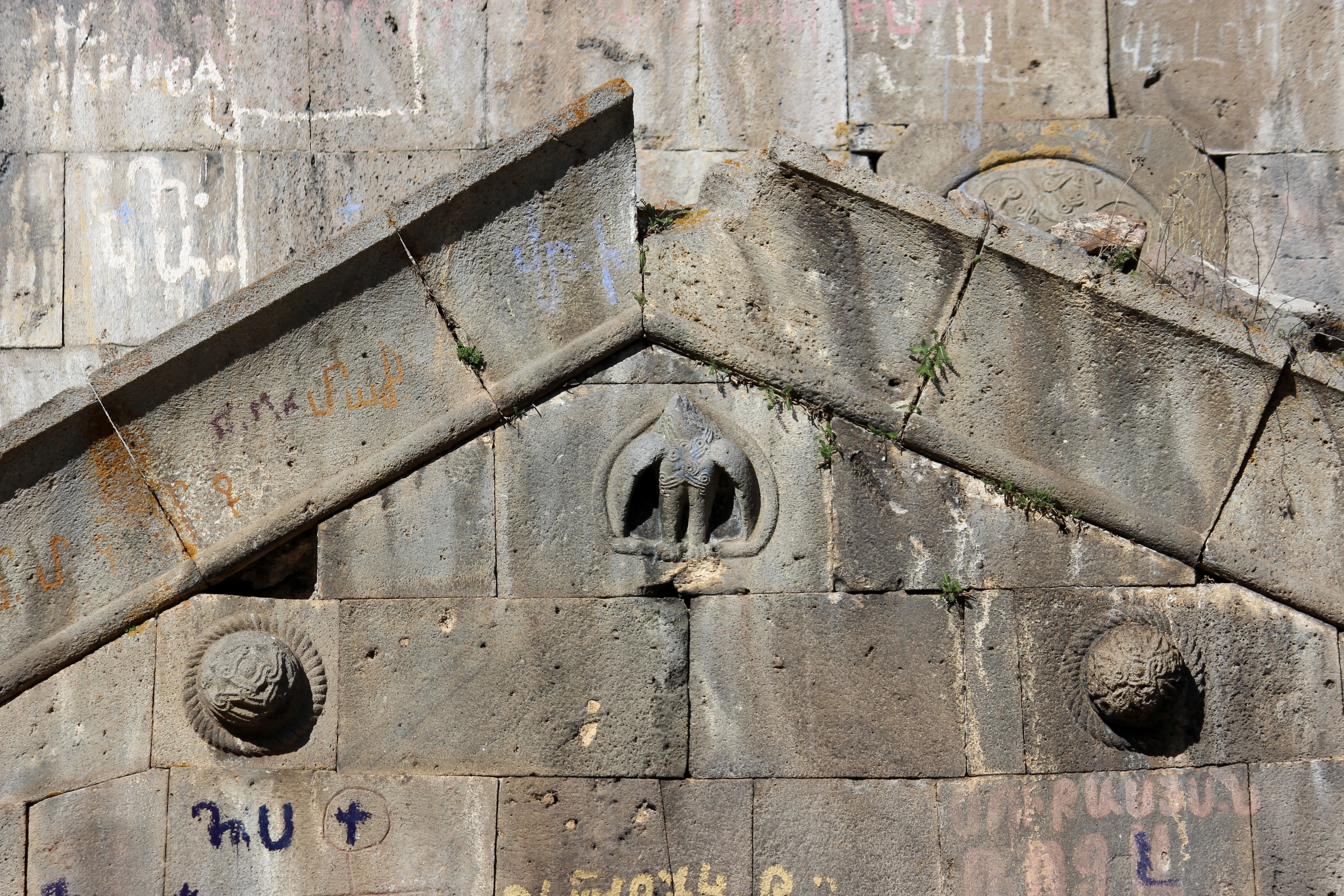
High-relief decoration of a bird perched on the surrounding frame (above the portico).

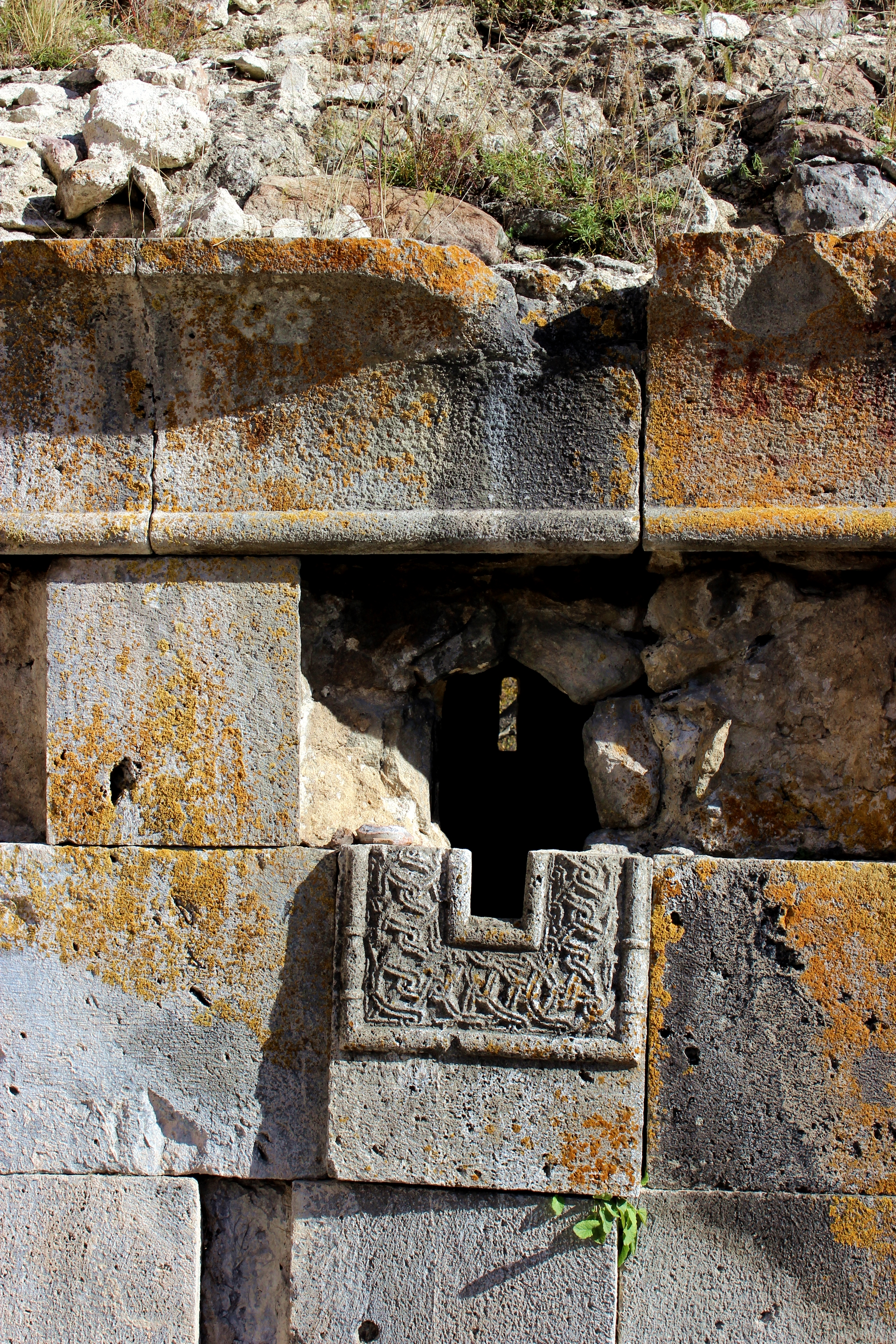
Portico window (left side, exterior)

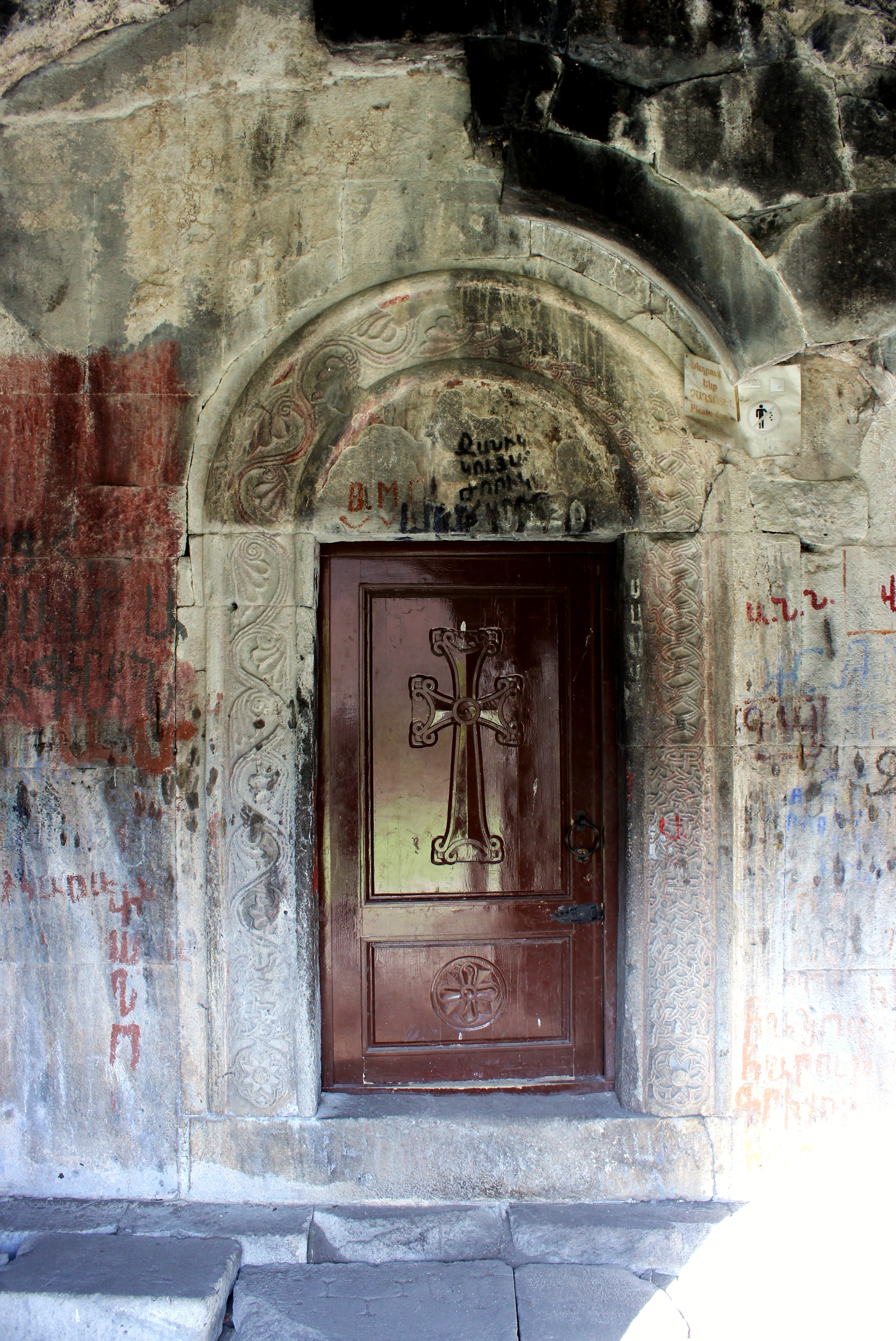
High-relief decoration surrounding the portal within the portico.

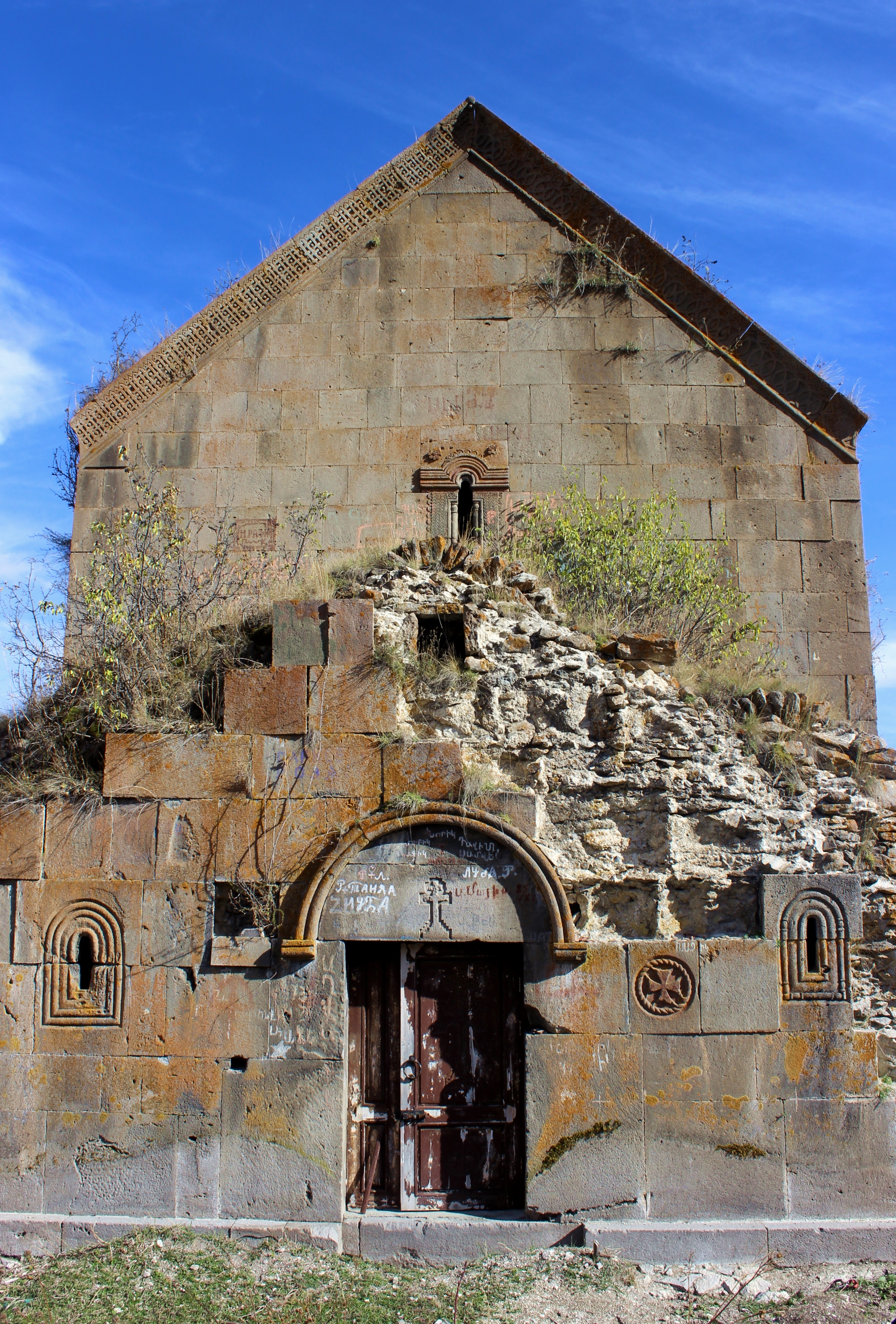
View of the gavit from the exterior.

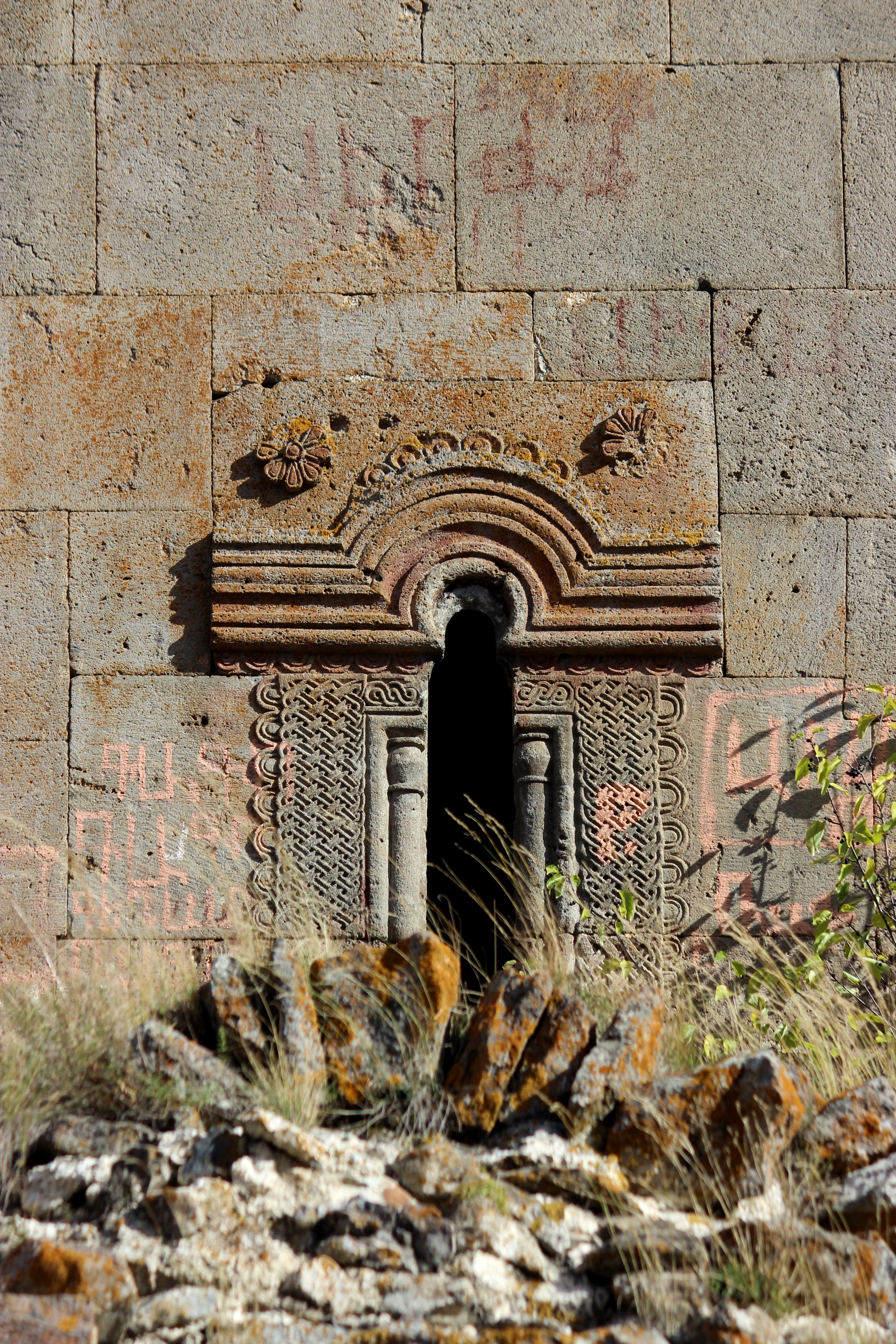
Basilica window resting above the gavit.

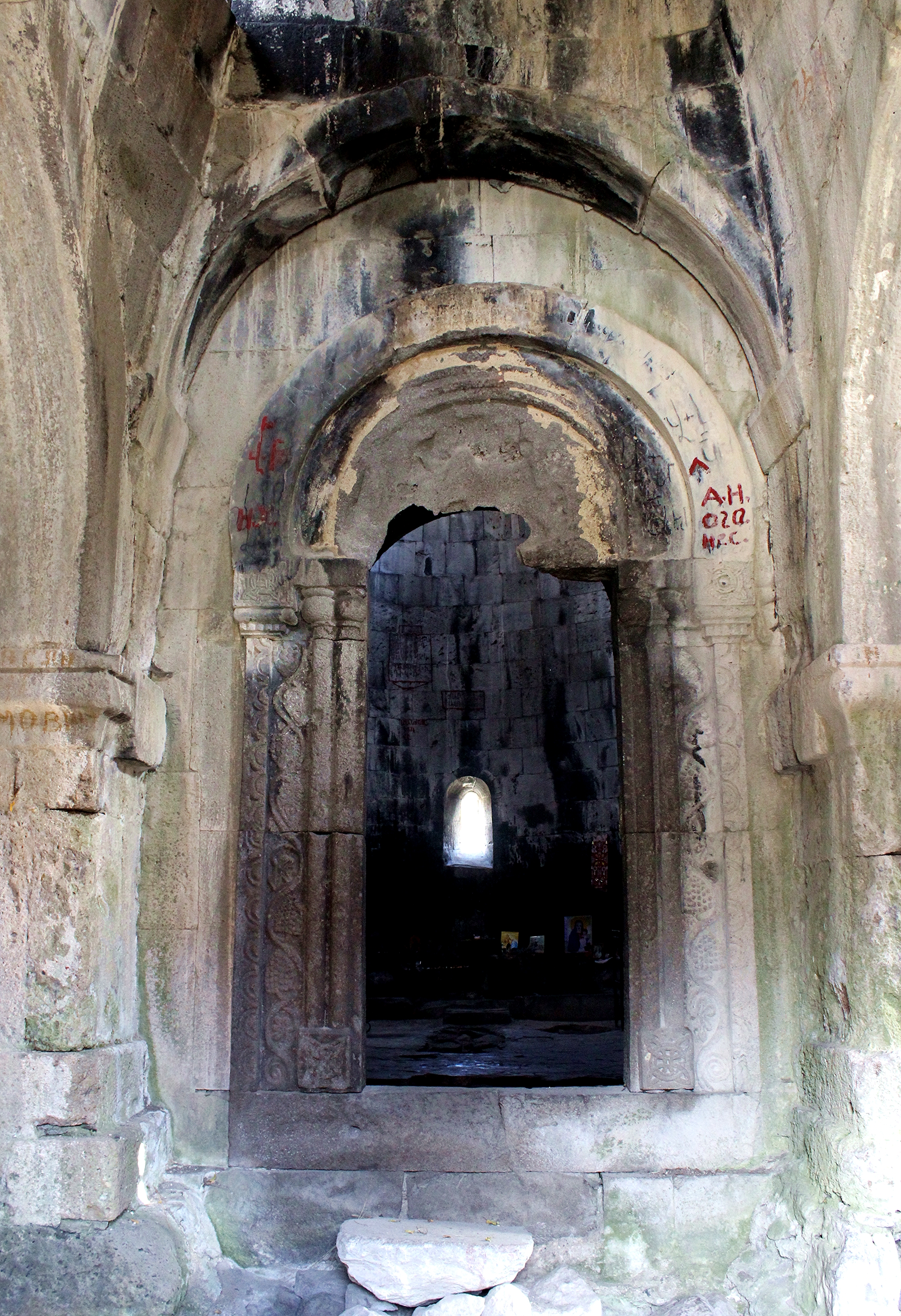
Interior portal within the gavit, leading into the main church.

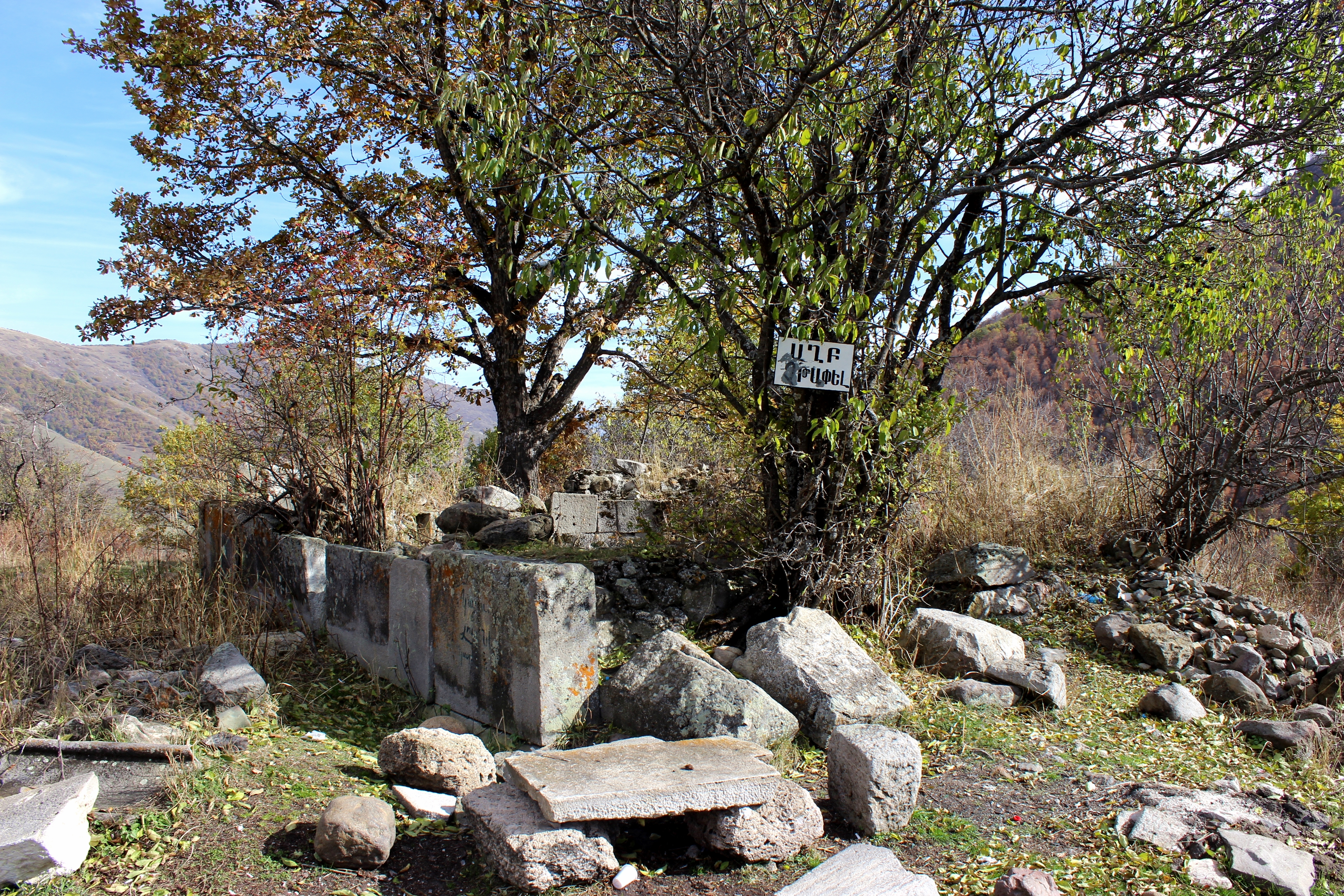
Lower walls of nearby chapel.

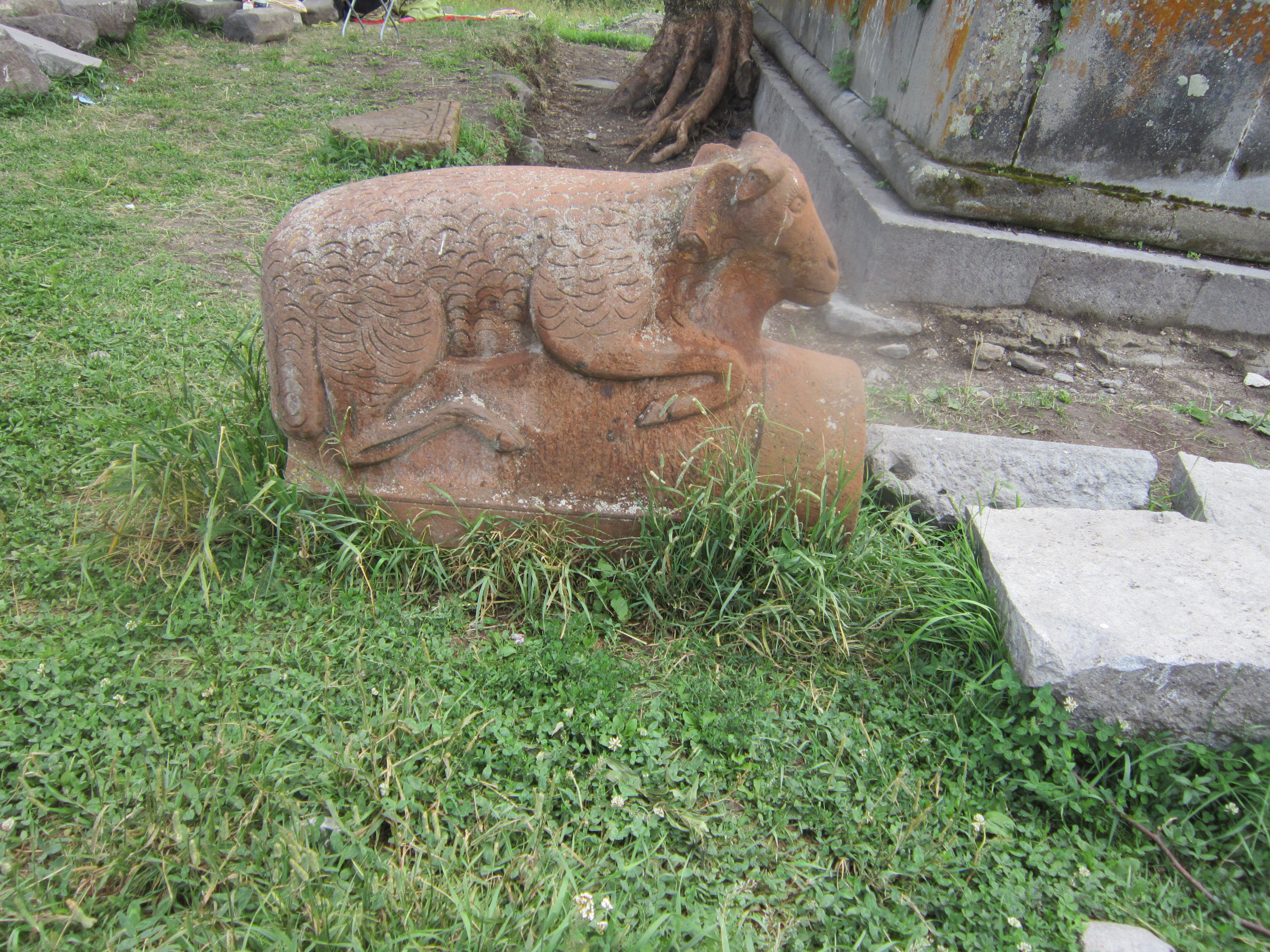
