= Sargis Zakarian =

Court official of the Kingdom of Georgia (died 1187)

Sargis Zakarian Սարգիս Զաքարյան
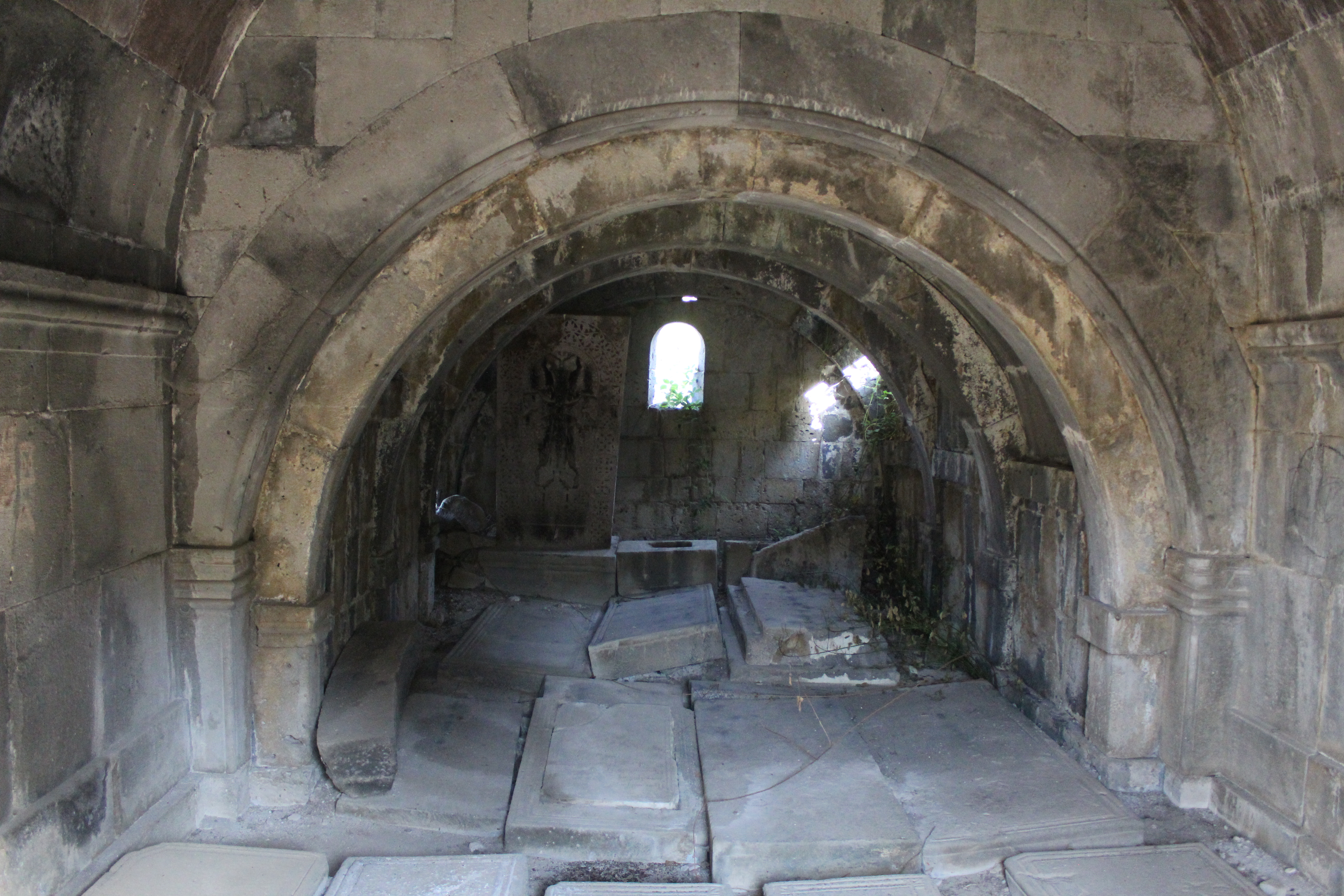
- Tomb of Sargis and his father Vahram in Sanahin Monastery. The structure was built by his sons Ivane and Zakare.

Amirspasalar
- In office 1181–1187
- Preceded by: Kubasar
- Succeeded by: Gamrekeli Toreli

Personal details
- Died: 1187
- Children: Zakare II Zakarian, Ivane I Zakarian, Nane (Inana), Dopi (Shushan), Tamta
- Parent: Zakare I Zakarian

Sargis Zakarian (Georgian: სარგის მხარგრძელი, romanized: sargis mkhargrdzeli; Armenian: Սարգիս Զաքարյան) was a founder of the Zakarid dynasty line. He was a Court official of the Kingdom of Georgia, holding the offices of Amirspasalar (Commander-in-Chief) for Queen Tamar of Georgia during the late 12th century. He was also ruler of feudal lands in the Kingdom of Georgia. He had two particularly famous sons: Ivane I Zakarian and Zakare II Zakarian.

Sargis rose to prominence at the Georgian court in 1177, when he supported George III of Georgia during a revolt of his feudal lords.

He was Commander-in-Chief of the Georgian army (Amirspasalar) from 1185, and he died in 1187 by the Georgian Queen Tamar. His son Zakare II Zakarian would inherit the title a few years later, from 1191.

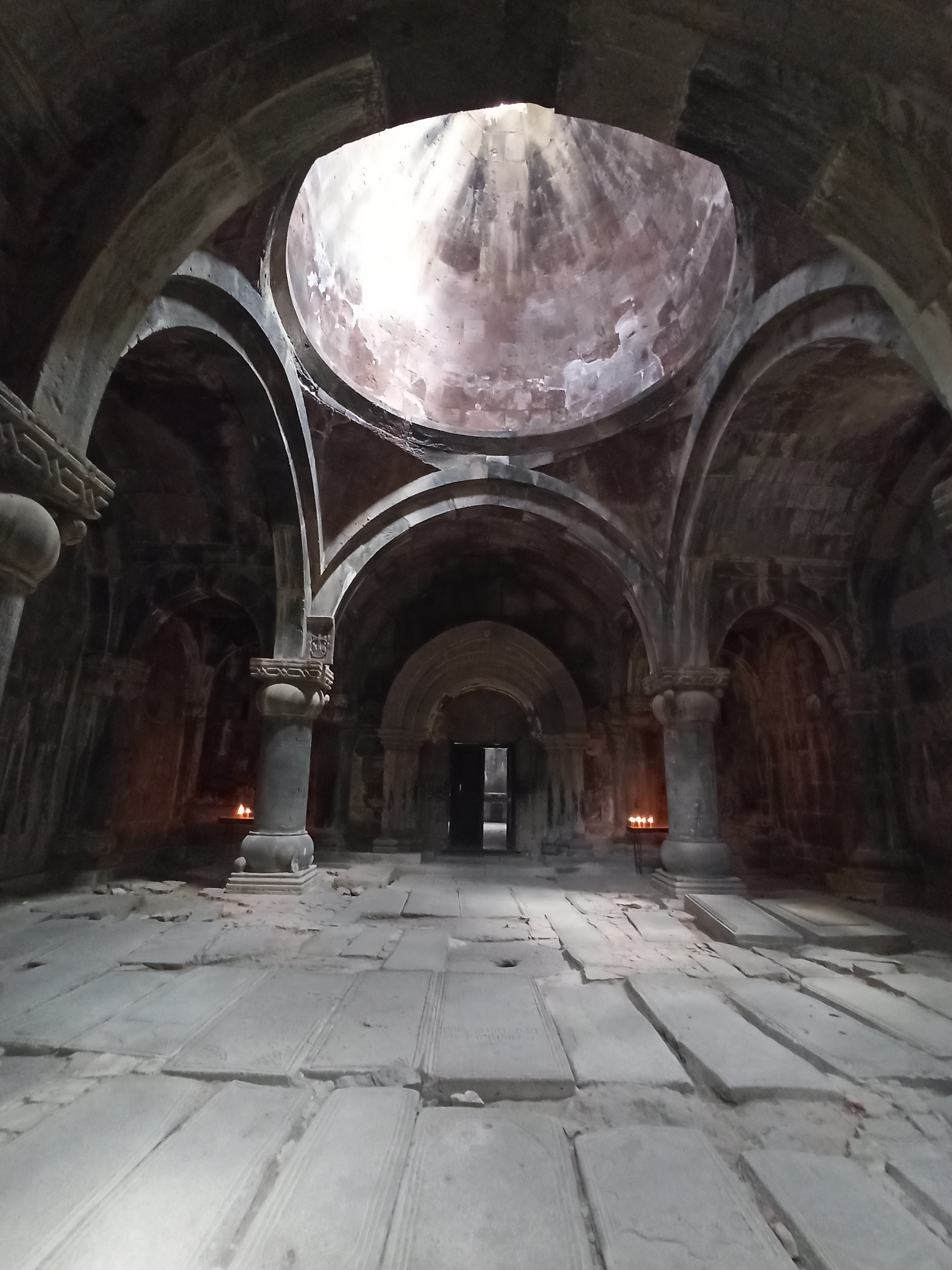
The gavit of the Church of St. Amenaprkitch in Sanahin Monastery, was built in 1181 and has an inscription mentioning Sargis.

Sargis appears in various inscriptions of the time, such as the dedicatory inscription for the repair of the Church of St. Amenaprkitch in Sanahin Monastery and the construction of a gavit adjoining it, by Abbot Yovhannēs in 1181:

In the year 630 (ie 1181 CE), at the time of the victorious king Georg, and amirspasalar Sargis and his sons Zak‘arē and Iwanē, and amira K‘urd, I, Yovannēs, Abbot of the holy monastery (re)built this once existing church and a gawit‘ from its foundations, with the help of amir K‘urd and the great vardapet Grigor and Christ God, with great hope...

== Family ==
He was married to Saakdukht Artsruni, of the House of Artsunids, their children were:

- Zakare II Zakarian;
- Ivane I Zakarian;
- Nerjis;
- Nana, who married Abbas II of Lori;
- Shushen;
- Tamta.
