= Meghradzor =

Meghradzor Մեղրաձոր
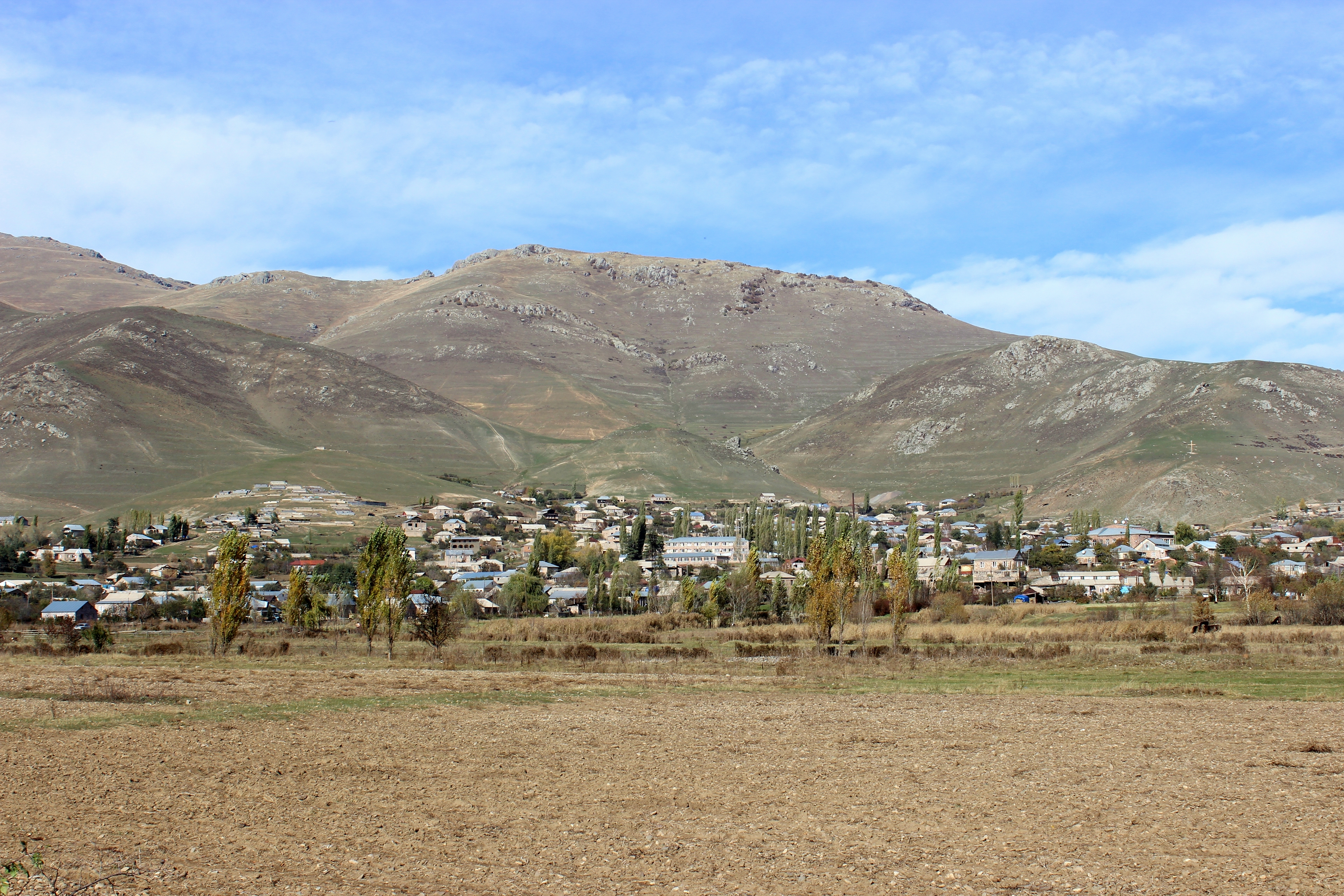
- Meghradzor

- Location within Armenia
- Coordinates: 40°36′53″N 44°38′59″E
- Country: Armenia
- Province: Kotayk
- Founded: 1830

Area
  - Total: 6.21 km^{2} (2.40 sq mi)
- Elevation: 1,820 m (5,970 ft)

Population (2011)
  - Total: 2,309
  - Density: 372/km^{2} (963/sq mi)
- Time zone: UTC+4

Meghradzor (Armenian: Մեղրաձոր, lit. 'valley of honey'; formerly known as Taycharukh) is a village in the Kotayk Province of Armenia, 15 kilometres (9 mi) northwest of Hrazdan. The village is located to the south of the Pambak mountain range, along the left bank of the Marmarik River.

The village was founded by immigrants from Aratsap in 1830 and is well known for its famous honey; hence, the name Meghradzor literally translates to valley of honey. The community has a secondary school, kindergarten, first aid station, house of culture, and library. The local economy is heavily dependent on agriculture, based predominantly on beekeeping, cattle-breeding, and farming (potatoes, cabbages, and grains). There is also a disused gold mine north of Meghradzor that has been in use since the 19th century. In the foothills nearby, to the south, is the 12th-century walled Chalcedonian Armenian Tejharuyk Monastery. The nearby village of Gorgoch is also included in the community of Meghradzor.

== Gallery ==
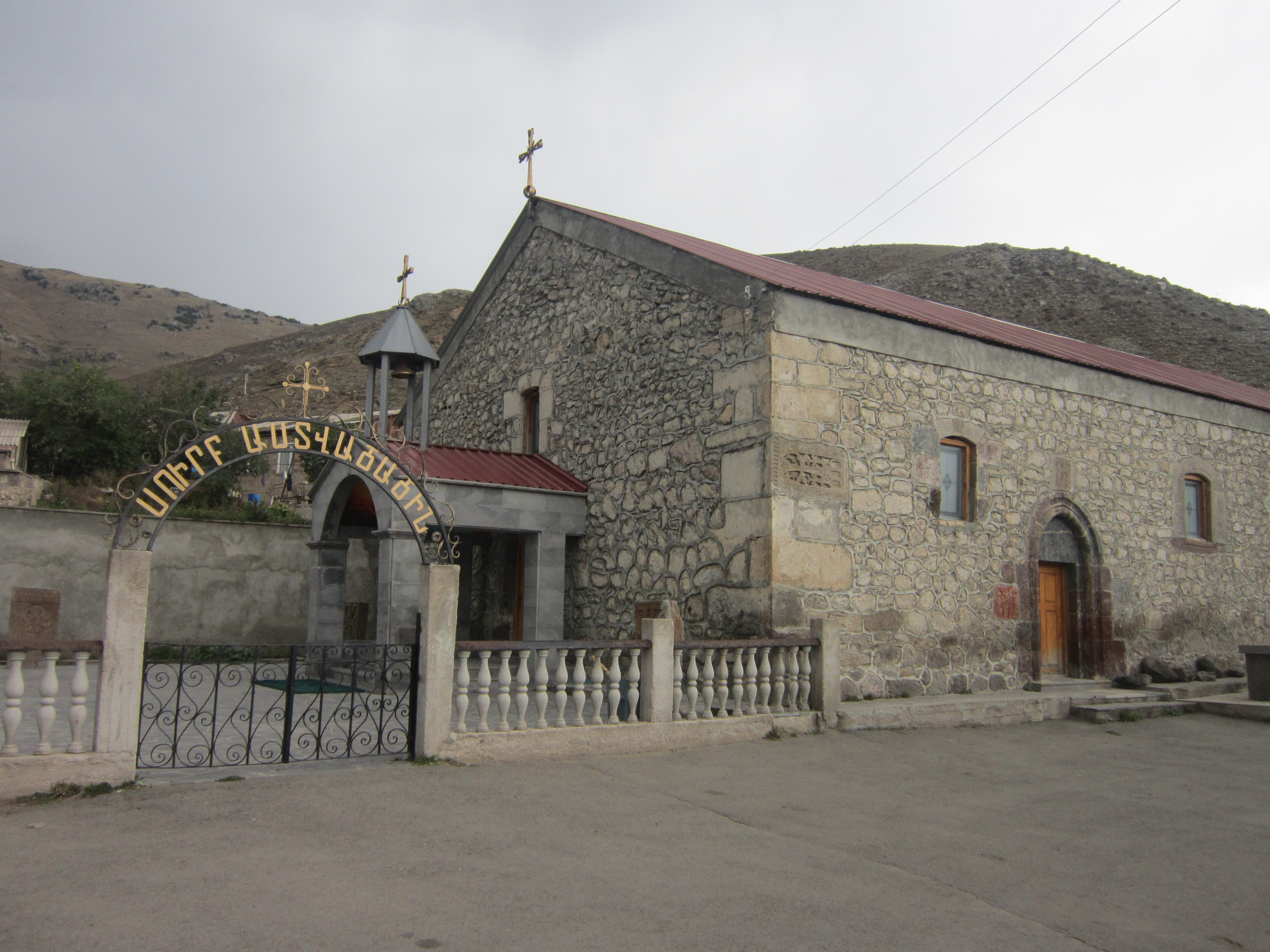
St. Astvatsatsin Church in the village, 1881

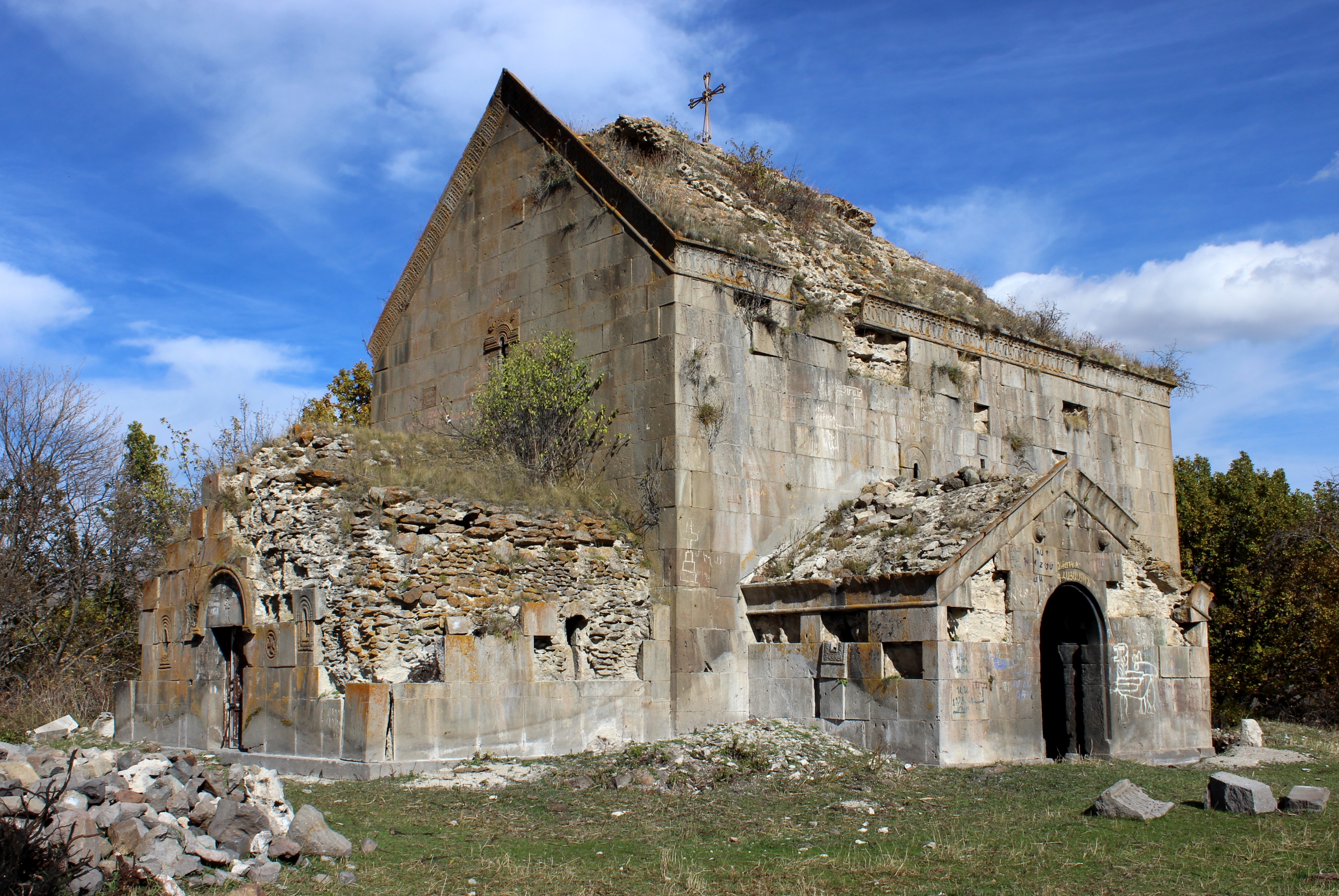
Tejharuyk Monastery, 1196–99

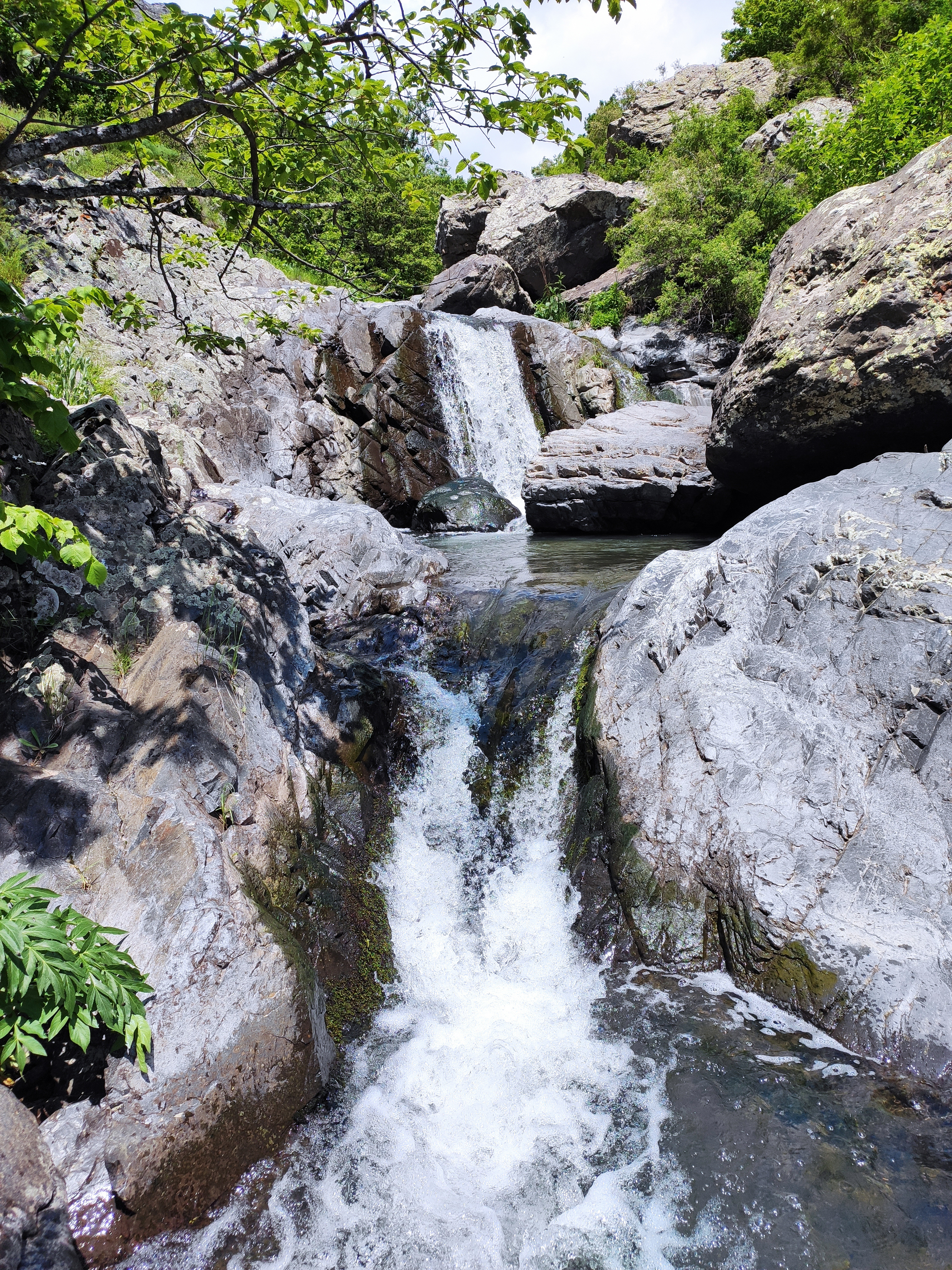
Meghradzor waterfall
