= Sargis Tmogveli =

12th-13th century Georgian statesman and writer

- Predecessor: Varam
- Successor: Taki ad-Din
- Noble family: House of Tmogveli
- Father: Varam Mkhargrdzeli

Sargis Tmogveli (Armenian: Սարգիս Թմոգվեցի, romanized: Sargis Tmogvec'i Georgian: სარგის თმოგველი), Sargis of Tmogvi or Sargis I Vahramian (Armenian: Սարգիս Ա Վահրամյան, romanized: Sargis A Vahramyan) was a 12th-13th century Armenian and Georgian statesman and writer active during the reign of Queen Tamar (c. 1184-1213). Sargis, son of Varam, belonged to the Tmogveli branch of the powerful Mkhargrdzeli family and owned estates in Tmogvi.

Tmogveli rendered the old Iranian love story Vīs and Rāmīn (written by Fakhruddin As'ad Gurgani) into Georgian prose; this Georgian version of the Persian original became known as Visramiani.

== Biography ==
During a revolt of Queen Tamar's disgraced husband, George the Rus', around 1191, Sargis was one of the few nobles who remained loyal to the queen. For this he was kindly rewarded; he was given Tmogvi to secure frontier borders in Javakheti. In 1195 he participated in the Battle of Shamkor. In the 1200s, Shalva and Sargis Tmogveli, commanded the Georgian troops during the victorious campaign against Kars. In 1203 he fought in a campaign in the country of Dvin.

== Sources ==
- Giunashvili, Jemshid (2013). "VISRAMIANI". Encyclopaedia Iranica.
- Gould, Rebecca Ruth (2018). "Sweetening the Heavy Georgian Tongue: Jāmī in the Georgian-Persianate World". In d'Hubert, Thibaut; Papas, Alexandre (eds.). Jāmī in Regional Contexts: The Reception of ʿAbd al-Raḥmān Jāmī's Works in the Islamicate World, ca. 9th/15th-14th/20th Century. Brill. ISBN 978-9004386600.
- Shoshiashvili, N. (1979). "თმოგველი სარგის". Georgian Soviet Encyclopedia. Vol. 4. Tbilisi. pp. 687–688.
