= Gorgoch =

Gorgoch Գոռգոչ
- Location within Armenia
- Coordinates: 40°36′N 44°37′E
- Country: Armenia
- Marz (Province): Kotayk

Population (2011)
  - Total: 28
- Time zone: UTC+4 ( )

Gorgoch (Armenian: Գոռգոչ); formerly known as Korchlu, Gorchulu, is a village in the Kotayk Province of Armenia. It is included in the community of Meghradzor village.

== See also ==
- Kotayk Province
