= Hmayak Siras =

Armenian writer, editor, translator

- Հմայակ Սիրաս
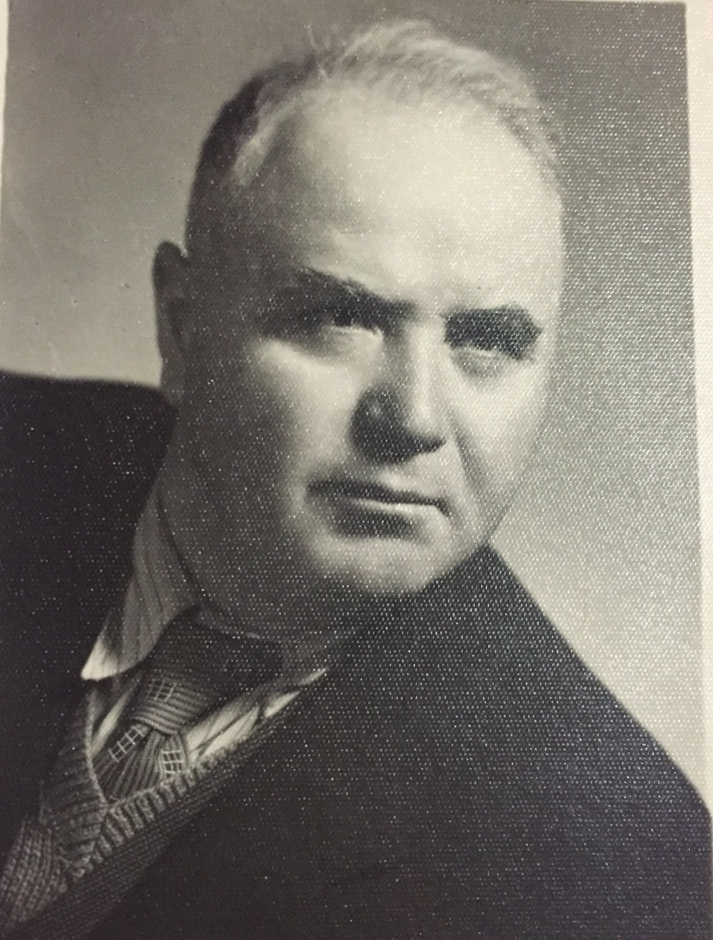
- 1955 portrait of Hmayak Siras
- Born: Hmayak Sahaki Voskanian; 15 February 1902; Karakilisa, Old Armenia, Republic of Turkey
- Died: 14 August 1983 (aged 81); Yerevan, Armenian SSR, Soviet Union
- Education: Yerevan State University Moscow State University
- Occupations: Writer, translator, editor
- Spouse: Tamara Askanazi Zagharian Voskanian (m. 1925; died 1967)
- Children: 3
- Writing career
- Genres: Romanticism, mythic fiction, military fiction

Signature
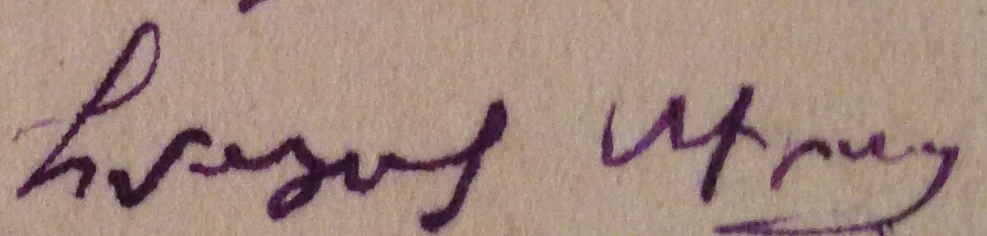

Hmayak Siras (born Hmayak Sahaki Voskanian (Armenian: Հմայակ Սահակի Ոսկանյան); 15 February 1902 – 14 August 1983) was an Armenian writer, editor, and translator. He is regarded as a significant figure in the development of twentieth-century Armenian literature. He was a member of the USSR Writers' Union and served twice as the executive secretary of the Writers Union of Armenia.

== Early life and career ==
Hmayak Siras was born Hmayak Sahaki Voskanian on 15 February 1902 in Karakilisa, a small town in Alashkert municipality in the historical region of Western Armenia (now part of Turkey). His parents were Sahak and Mariza Voskanian. He was the first of five children. His parents encouraged his love of literature, art, and music. He studied at a local school until the age of fourteen, when the Armenian genocide forced his family to flee to Tbilisi, the capital of Georgia.

In 1921, Siras returned to Armenia with his family. He enrolled at Yerevan State University, where he graduated from the History and Literature Department in 1925. He graduated from the MSU Faculty of Journalism at Moscow State University in 1932.

In 1922, Siras published his first story, "In a Boiling Cauldron," in Yerevan magazine Murch. Between 1922 and 1940, Siras continued to publish novels and short stories, ranging from strictly realistic to those incorporating legendary elements. In 1936, he published a story in Kurmanji called "Letîfe". By this time, he had adopted the pen name Hmayak Siras, which he took from the Henryk Sienkiewicz novel Kamo Ridge.

During this period, Siras worked as a journalist and editor at various newspapers and magazines in Armenia. From 1939 to 1941, Voskanian served as the Executive Secretary of the Writers' Union of Armenia.

== Service in the Red Army ==
Hmayak Siras in uniform, 1942

In 1941, Siras enlisted with the Soviet Red Army. After the completion of academic military courses, he was appointed to the rank of major and was made editor-translator of Armenian publications in the Main Political Department of the Ministry of Defence. He served until the end of World War II.

== Later career ==
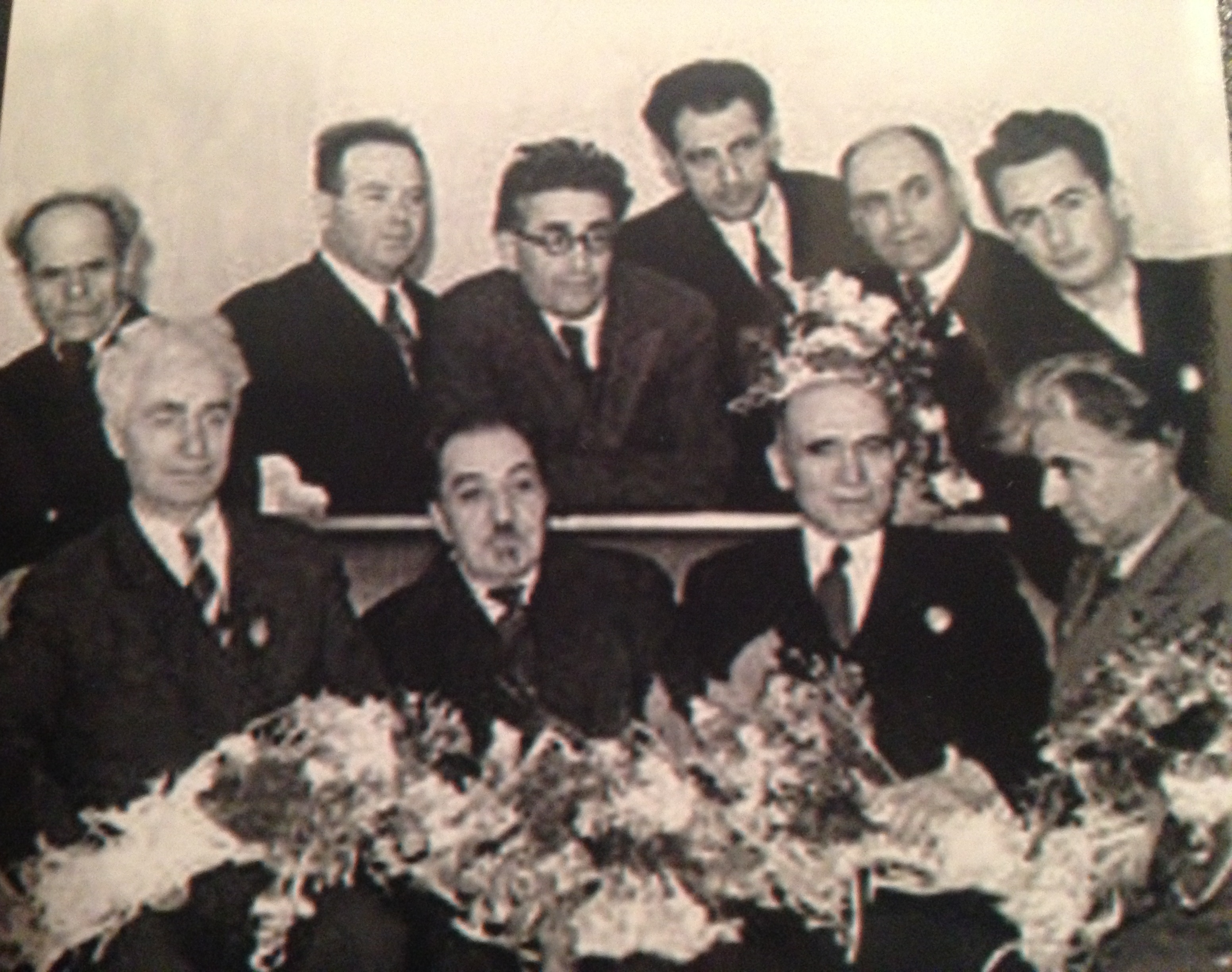
Writers Union of Armenia, 1947; Siras is second from the left, top row

After the war, Siras left the military. He was again elected as the Executive Secretary of the Writers' Union of Armenia, serving from 1946 to 1948. In 1946, Siras published his first war novel, Father and Son, followed by Singer in 1952 and Ararat in 1956. In 1968, he was given the honorary title Honorary Worker of Culture of Armenia.

Siras was well-known for translations of texts from Russian to Armenian. In 1972, he was made an honorary member of the Kalevala Society of Helsinki for his translation of the Finnish epic Kalevala. His most notable novel, a historical epic titled The Native Land, was published in Armenian in 1974 and in Russian in 1979. The Native Land is a lengthy historical portrait of the Armenian people. His last works are the novels In the Bindings of Time and his memoir, 21 Years with Avetik Isahakyan.

== Personal life ==
Hmayak Siras married Tamara Askanazovna Voskanian (née Zakharyan) in 1925. They had three daughters: Lusia, Mary, and Anahit.

== Death and legacy ==
Hmayak Siras died on 14 August 1983 in Yerevan. He is buried at the cemetery in Nubarashen District. Commemorative stamps bearing his portrait were released for his 100th and 110th birthdays. The Armenian government installed a memorial plaque on the building of the house in which he lived his final years.

== Gallery ==
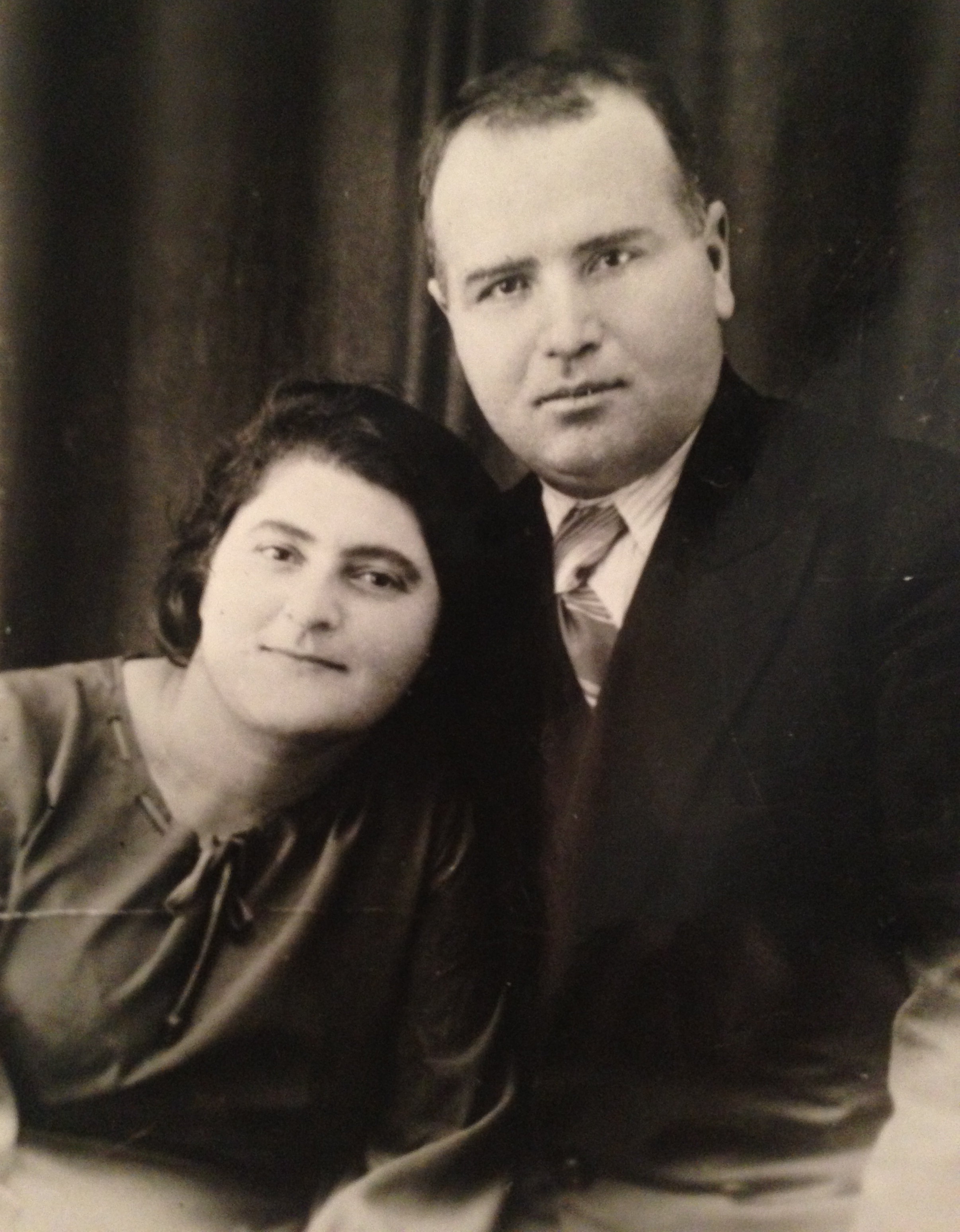
Siras with his wife Tamara in 1939

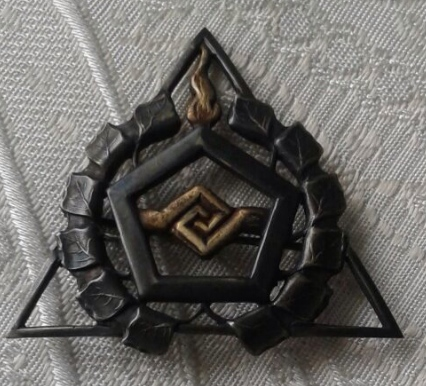
Kalevala Society medal awarded to Siras in 1972

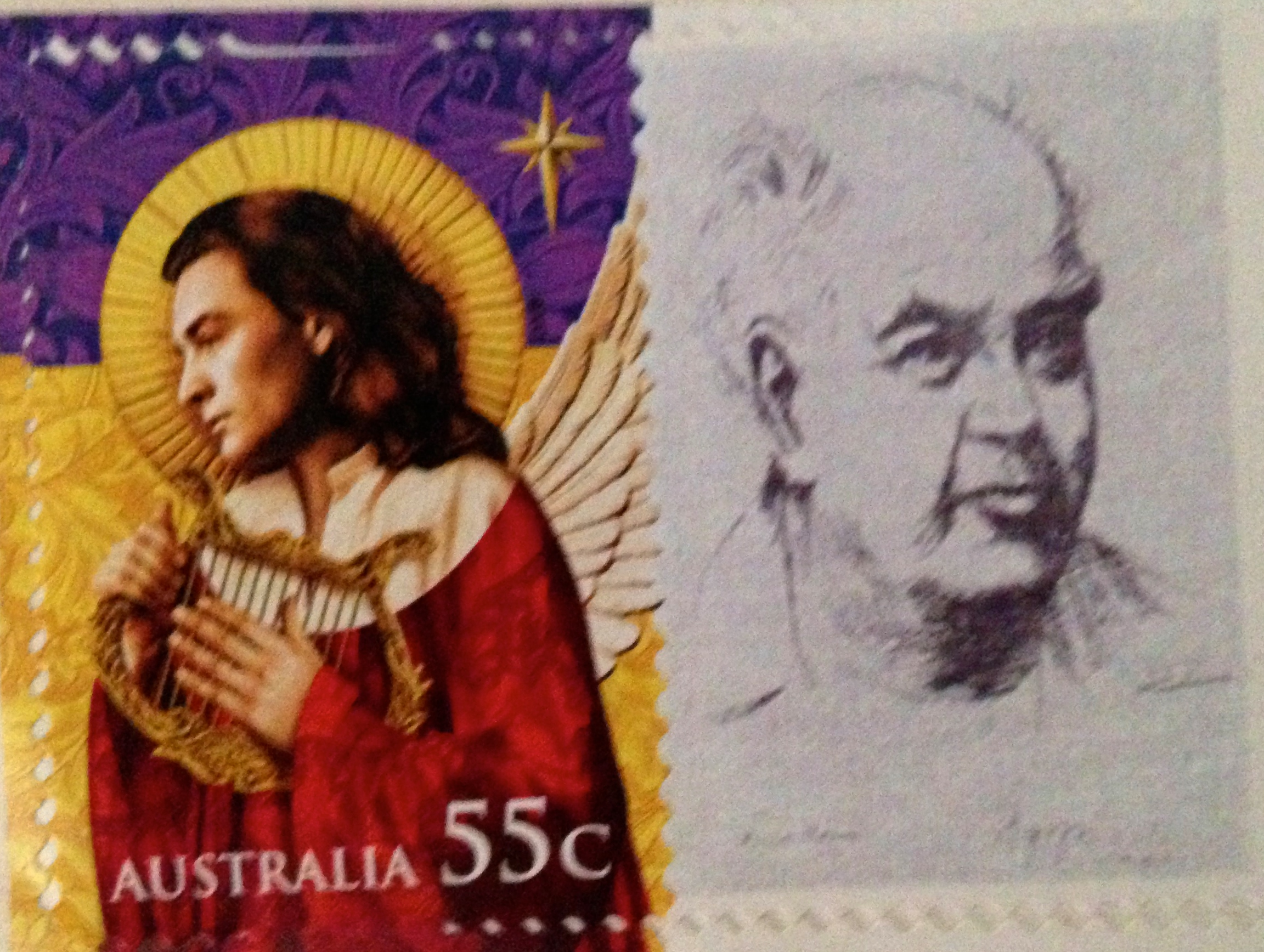
First commemorative stamp released in honor of Siras

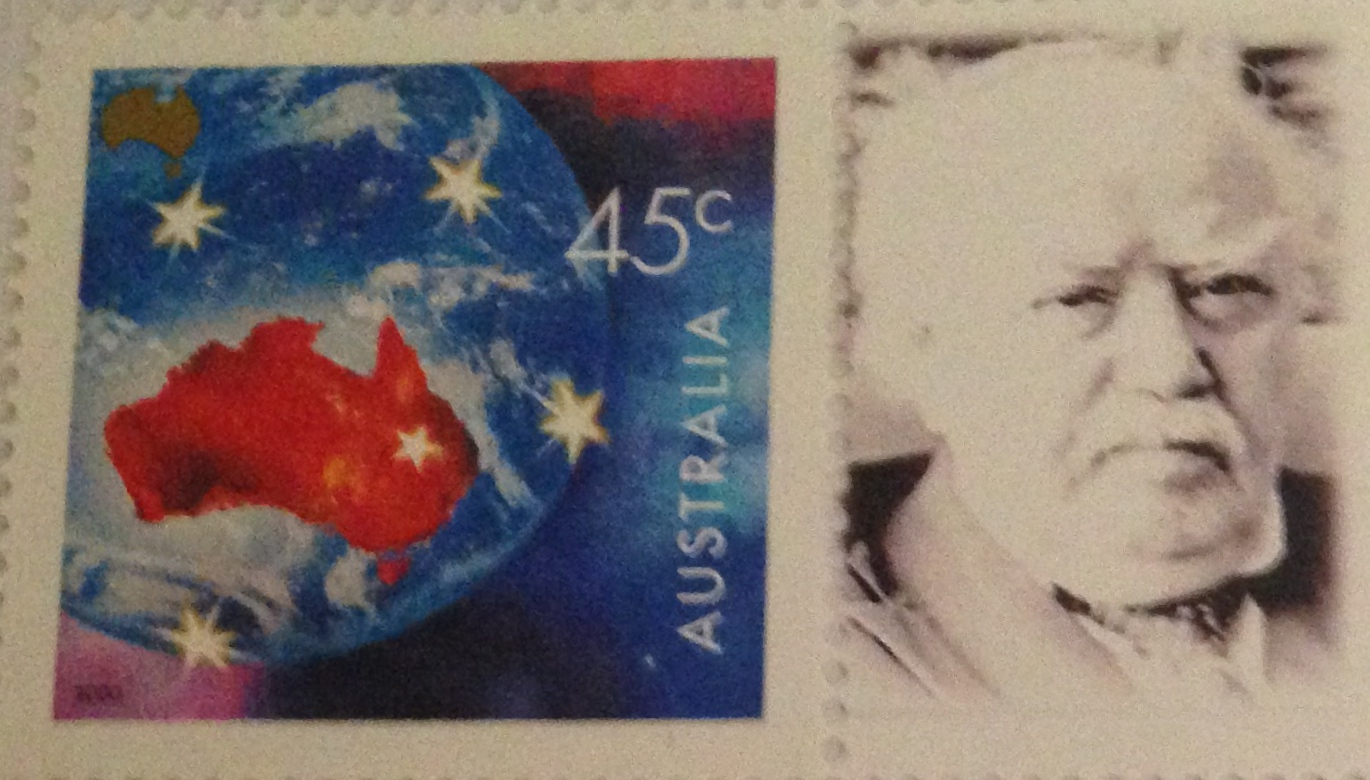
Second commemorative stamp released in honor of Siras

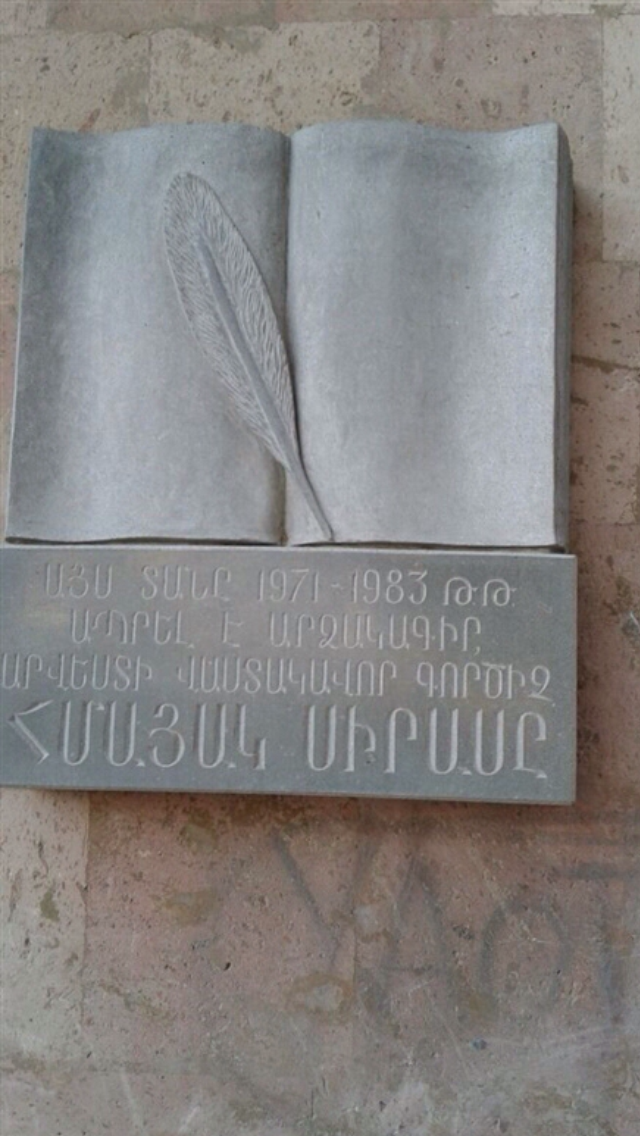
Memorial plaque on Siras' home in Yerevan
