= Zakaria Gageli =

- Ruler of Gagi
- Successor: Vahram Gageli
- Noble family: Mkhargrdzeli
- Father: Vahram Mkhargrdzeli

Zakaria Gageli or Zakaria of Gagi was a Georgian noble of Armenian descent and one of the commanders of Tamar's army during the late 12th and early 13th centuries. He was the ruler of feudal lands in the Kingdom of Georgia.

During a revolt of Tamar's disgraced husband in 1191, George the Rus, Zakaria, son of Vahram, was one of the few nobles who remained loyal to the Queen. Gracious to those who were loyal to her, Tamar bestowed Tavush, Parisos, Gardman and many towns, castles and villages to Zakaria, thus extending his possessions up to neighbouring Ganja. The centre of his realm was Gagi fortress, after of which this line of Mkhargrdzeli family became known as House of Gageli. In 1195 Zakaria participated in the Battle of Shamkor, where his horse was killed. In 1203 he participated in the Battle of Basian against Rum Sultanate.
