= Tmogvi =

Medieval fortress in Georgia

Tmogvi (Tmkaberd)
- თმოგვი
- Aspindza municipality, Samtskhe-Javakheti, Georgia
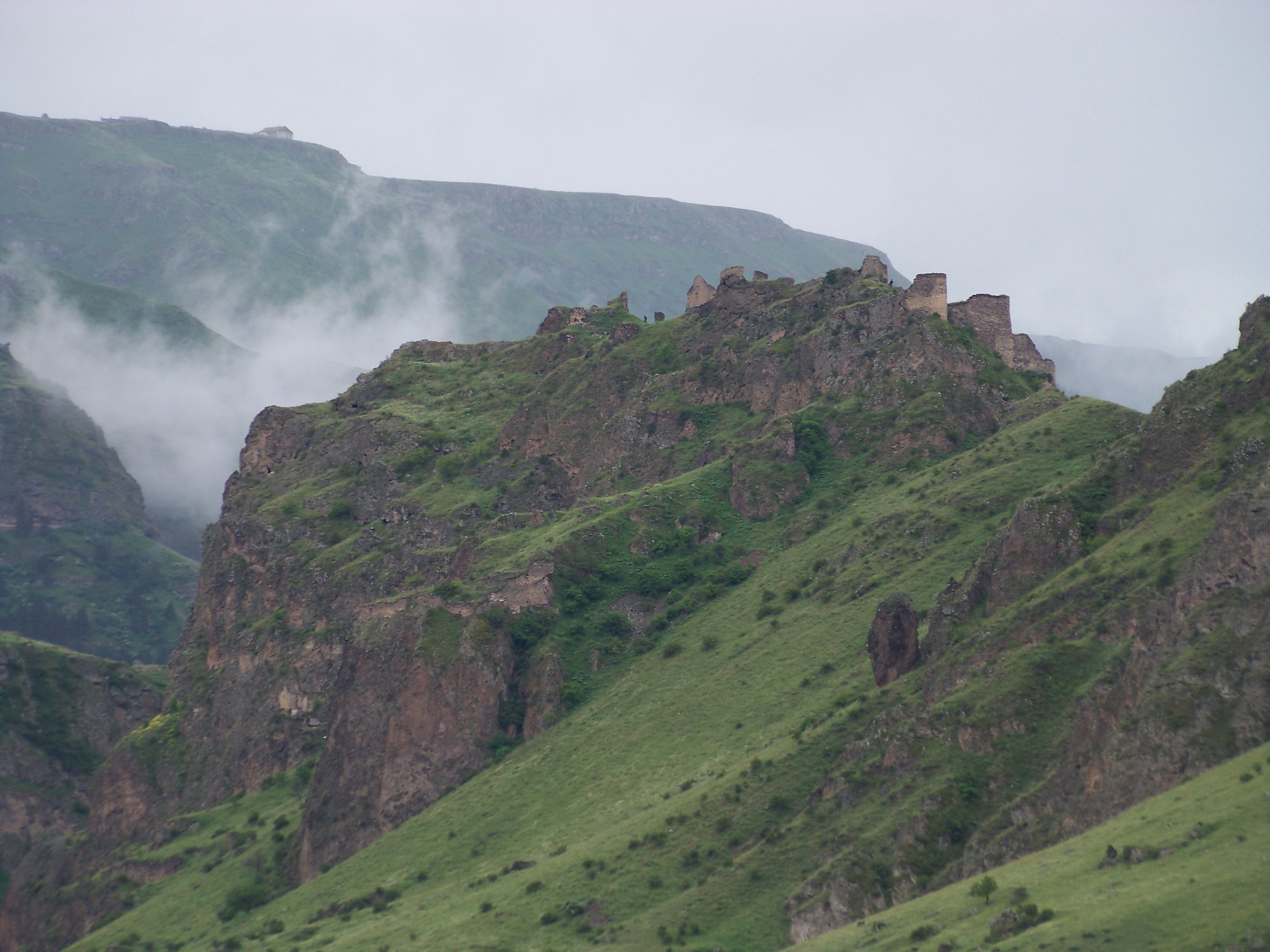
- The ruins of Tmogvi from the North

Site information
- Condition: Ruined

Location
- Location within Samtskhe-Javakheti Location within Georgia
- Coordinates: 41°24′18.0″N 43°19′44.4″E

Site history
- Built: 10th century

Immovable Cultural Monument of National Significance of Georgia
- Official name: Tmogvi Castle-Ruins complex
- Designated: November 7, 2006; 19 years ago
- Reference no.: 332
- Item Number in Cultural Heritage Portal: 8270;16454;17187;16453; 16452;10813;8288;8286; 8284;8281;8278;8274; 8270;8268;
- Date of entry in the registry: October 3, 2007; 18 years ago

Tmogvi or Tmkaberd (Georgian: თმოგვი, romanized: Tmogvi [tʰmoɡʷi]; Armenian: Թմկաբերդ, romanized: Tʼmkaberd) is a ruined fortress and medieval town in the southern Georgian region of Samtskhe-Javakheti, on the left bank of the Kura River, a few kilometers downstream of the cave city of Vardzia.

== History ==
The name "Tmogvi" is derived from the Armenian word mog, meaning "pagan priest" or "magus". The fortress is first mentioned in sources from the 9th century. It was built as a defensive work controlling the ancient trade route between the Javakheti plateau and the gorge of Kura, over a gorge formed by the Kura River. It was a crucial military stronghold in the region of Javakheti. The feudal lords of the region were at that time the Bagratids, the Georgian branch. The Georgian chronicles report numerous attempts to take the castle over, but they were rarely successful.

Tmogvi gained importance after the neighboring town and fortress of Tsunda was ruined around 900 AD. In 914 Yusuf ibn Abi'l-Saj approached Tmogvi, but retreated without an attempt to capture it. This was the first mention of the fortress in the chronicles. By the beginning of the 11th century, the fortress had passed under the direct control of the unified Kingdom of Georgia. The second mention is connected with this period, when the country was ruled by Bagrat III. The king imprisoned two rulers of the duchy of Klarjeti, Sumbat III and his brother Gurgen, in the fortress.

In 1073, it was given in apanage to the nobleman Niania Kuabulisdze; his descendants kept it in the following centuries, before it passed to other major feudal families such as the Toreli, the Tmogveli, the Shalikashvili or the Jaqeli. In 1088, the fortress collapsed in the first devastating earthquake, when its ruler Kakhaber and his wife both died. In 1191, the fortress was gifted to Sargis-Mkhargrdzeli by Queen Tamar. Mkhargrdzeli ruled in Tmogvi for a century. The most famous among them, Sargis Tmogveli was also a writer and poet, and philosopher. The town was restored and blossomed, after it was destroyed again in the second earthquake of 1283.

The third earthquake of 1319 destroyed Tmogvi again. It was restored during the rule of Murvan Katkhaidze by architect Theodor. The medieval Georgian writer Sargis Tmogveli was from Tmogvi. Shalikashvili family were the last rulers of the fortress in the 16th century. Ottoman Empire gained control of the fortress in 1578. In 1829, the Treaty of Adrianople transferred the fortress, among with the surrounding region, to the Russian Empire.

== Architecture ==
The castle of Tmogvi was built in picturesque surroundings, on top of a poorly accessible mountain high above the Kura River. It is protected from two sides by the river and from another from sides by deep gorges. Access to the castle is via narrow passages, protected by the walls. The castle expands over 3 hills, joined and encircled by a wall (150 meters long, 3 meters wide), which supplements the natural defense offered by the cliffs. A number of towers was built on each hill. A secret tunnel connects the castle with the river to provide access to water even during a siege. Within the walls two reservoirs accumulated water. The western part of the fortress is better preserved. A small number of buildings subsist inside the castle itself. A quadrangular building made of tuff on a basalt foundation is assumed to have been a church. Outside of the walls, on the western side, the church of Saint Ephrem subsists in ruined condition, with fragments of frescoes from the 13th century. Ruins of the town are spread far from the southeastern walls along the slope.

== In tradition, art and literature ==
In 1902, Armenia's national poet Hovhannes Tumanyan wrote one of his most famous poems, titled The Capture of Tmkaberd (Armenian: Թմկաբերդի առումը).

Based on Tumanyan's work, Russian poet Sophia Parnok wrote the libretto "The Capture of Tmbkaberd" (Russian: Взятие Тмкаберда). Soviet-Armenian composer Alexander Spendiaryan used the libretto to create his famous opera Almast in 1928.

According to an Armenian oral tradition recorded during a scientific expedition, the castle once belonged to an Armenian duke, who successfully repelled the attempts of invaders to storm the castle. But a Persian shah seduced his wife and took the castle by cunning. After poisoning her husband and making his army drunk, the duke's wife opened the castle gates for the enemy. After taking the castle the Persians perpetrated a brutal reprisal against its defenders and residents of nearby villages.

== See also ==
- Tsunda
