= Zakarid dynasty =

Armenian noble family

Zakarids Զաքարյաններ მხარგრძელი
- Nobility
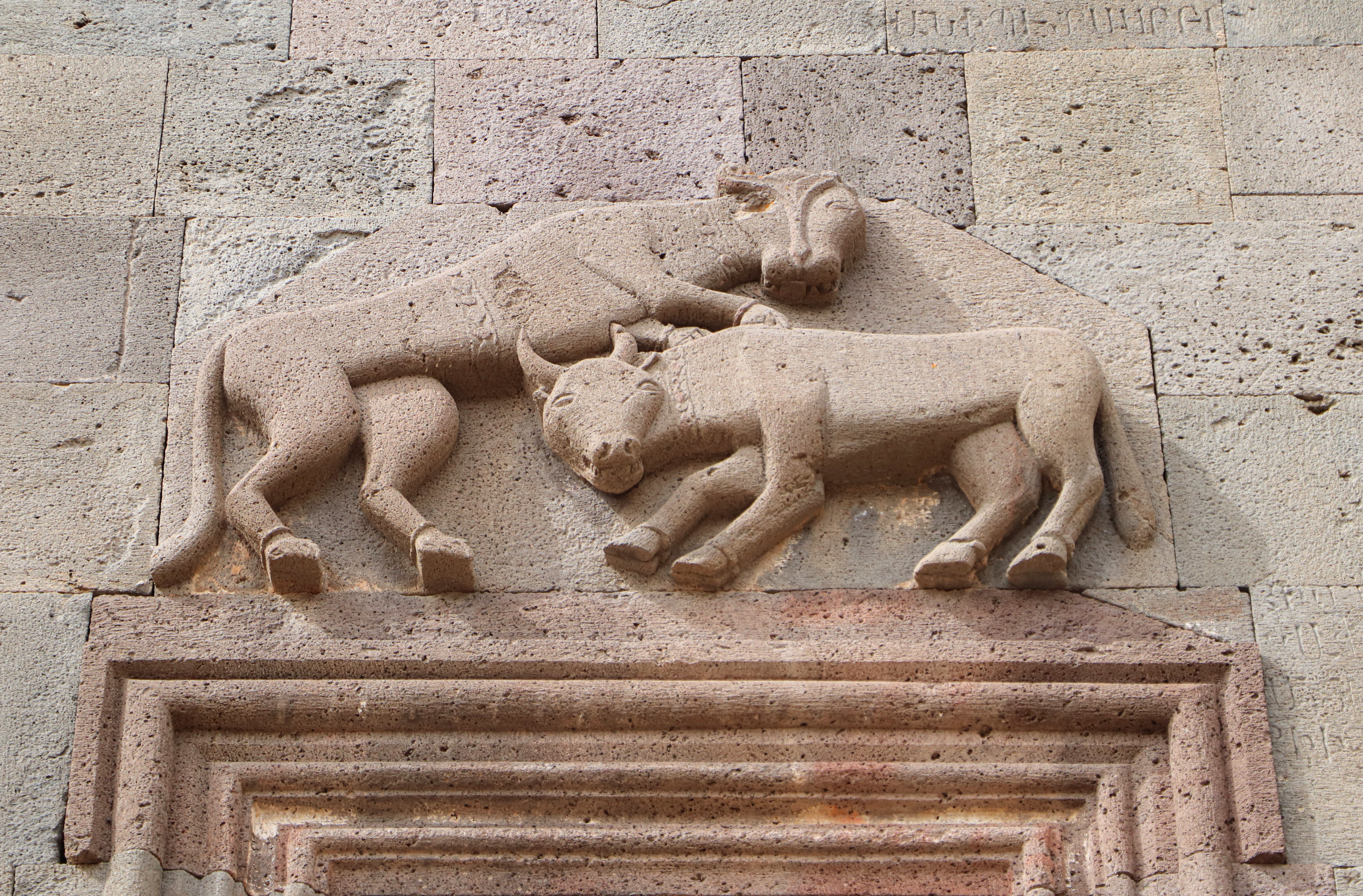
- Zakaryan's coat of arms with the iconography of a lion and a bull, at Geghard.
- Parent house: Pahlavuni
- Country: Zakarid Armenia
- Founder: Khosrov
- Cadet branches: Tmogveli; Gageli; Argutinsky-Dolgorukov

The Zakarid dynasty, also Zakarids or Zakarians (Armenian: Զաքարյաններ, romanized: Zak'aryanner) were an Armenian noble dynasty, rulers of Zakarid Armenia (1201–1350) under the suzerainty of the Kingdom of Georgia, and from 1256 under the control of the Mongol Ilkhanate of Persia. Their dynastic name was formed in honour of Zakare, the famous servant of the Georgian King Tamar. They were also known by their Georgian nickname Mkhargrdzeli (მხარგრძელი, "Long-armed", in Armenian: Երկայնաբազուկ, Yerkaynbazuk). The Zakarians considered themselves Armenians.

During the 13th century, the Zakarids held the highest offices in the Georgian court, as Atabegs (Governor General) and Amirspasalars (Commander-in-Chief of the Army) of the Kingdom of Georgia.

== Origins and Names ==
The dynasty's origins and identity have been debated, with different scholars suggesting Armenian or Kurdish origins on the basis of different sources. Zakarid inscriptions in Armenian and claims to Armenian titulature, along with most earlier members of the dynasty being Armenian Christians, are important in suggesting an Armenian origin.

A family legend says that their Georgian name of Mkhargrdzeli was a reference to their supposed Achaemenid ancestor Artaxerxes II the "Longarmed" (404–358 BC). Some scholars, notably Margaryan, have suggested that this is linked to the Kurdish origin story for the family, which might then be a constructed fabulous or foreign ancestry. This would link the Zakarians to similar potentially mythic foreign origin stories told about the Mamikonian and Orbelian families.

According to Cyril Toumanoff / Encyclopædia Iranica, they were an offshoot of the Armenian Pahlavuni family.

== 11th-12th Centuries ==
The first historically traceable Zakarid was Khosrov Zakarian in the early 11th century. During the next hundred years the Zakarids became vassals of the Bagrationi kings, and gained prominence at the Georgian court. In the 1120s, David IV of Georgia liberated parts of Armenia (Lori Province) from the grip of the Seljuk Empire, starting a period of Georgian political domination of about a hundred years, while Armenians became prominent in trade and among the urban populations of Gori and Tbilisi. The Zakarids became vassals of the House of Orbeli. Under George III of Georgia, Sargis Zakarian was appointed as governor of the Armenian city of Ani in 1161, however it was soon recaptured by the Shaddadids. In 1177, the Zakarids supported the monarchy against the insurgents during the rebellion of Prince Demna and the Orbeli family. The uprising was suppressed, and George III persecuted his opponents and elevated the Zakarids. Sargis was granted Lori during the reign of the Tamar of Georgia in 1186, starting a long period during which the Zakarids held some of the highest positions at the Georgian court, such as Atabeg (Governor General) and Amirspasalar (Commander-in-Chief of the Georgian army).

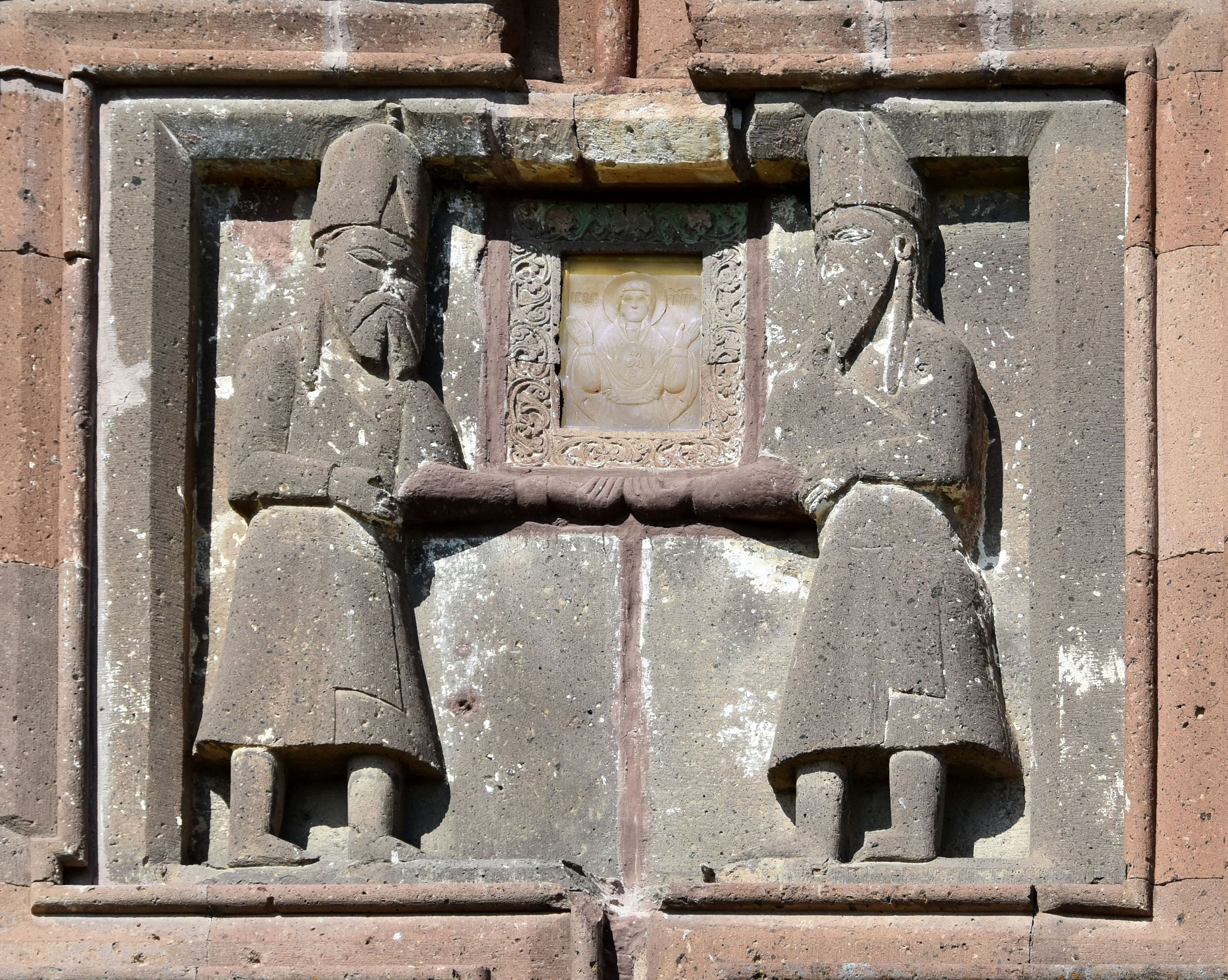
Zakare II and Ivane I on the east facade at Harichavank, Armenia, 1201. They wear the contemporary costume, with tall sharbush hat and kaftans.

The Zakarids were so successful and talentuous, with land holdings throughout Armenia and Georgia, that they were promoted to the highest posts in the Georgian government, despite their Kurdish-Armenian origins and the fact that they followed the Monophysite Christian faith rather than Diophysite faith of the Georgians. The brothers, Zakare and Ivane Zakarian, who were sons of Sargis, were the most successful representatives of the family, who were military commanders under King Tamar. Zakare and Ivane took Dvin in 1193. They also took Sevan, Bjni, Amberd and Bargushat, and all the towns above the city of Ani, up to the bridge of Khodaafarin bridge. Around the year 1199, they took the city of Ani, and in 1201, Tamar gave Ani to them as a principality. Eventually, their territories came to resemble those of Bagratid Armenia. Their achievements under King Tamar also facilitated the first large-scale migration of Kurdish tribes to the Caucasus. However, most of the migrants eventually converted to Christianity and became fully assimilated into the Georgian society, around the same time, Ivane converted to Georgian Orthodox Christianity, while Zakare remained Armenian Apostolic in faith. The brothers commanded the Armenian-Georgian armies for almost three decades, achieving major victories at Shamkor in 1195 and Basen in 1203 and leading raids into northern Iran in 1210 and suppression of rebellions of mountaineers in 1212. They amassed a great fortune, governing all of northern Armenia; Zakare and his descendants ruled in northwestern Armenia with Ani as their capital, while Ivane and his offspring ruled eastern Armenia, including the city of Dvin.

Both brothers left several bilingual inscriptions across the Armeno-Georgian border lands and built several churches and forts, such as the Harichavank Monastery and Akhtala Monastery in northern Armenia. The family went in decline with the establishment of Mongol power in the Caucasus.

=== Offices in the Georgian government ===
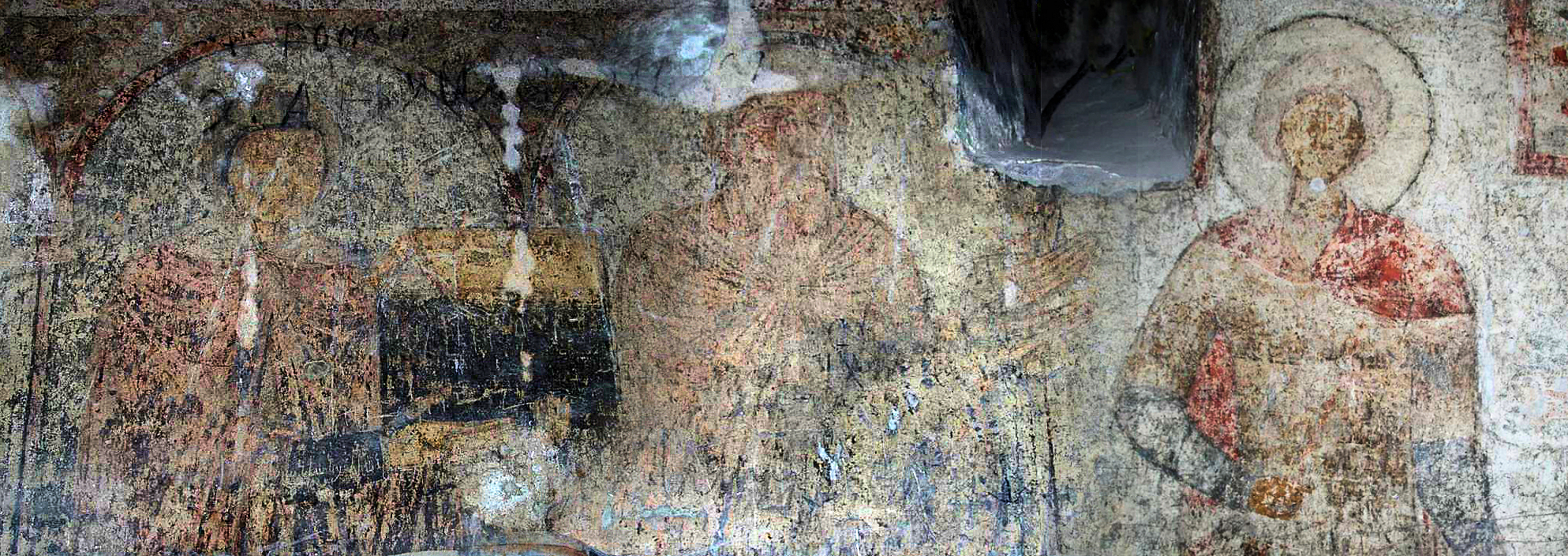
Probable depictions of Amirspasalar Shahnshah Zakarian (center), his wife Vaneni (left), and a kindred in military uniform (right), as donators at the Kobayr Monastery, Chapel-Aisle, 1282.

The Zakarids held some of the highest offices in the Georgian government. Ivane I Zakarian was the first Atabeg of the Georgian kingdom under King Tamar from 1207 and remaining in office until his death in 1227. From 1217, he also became Amirspasalar, Commander-in-Chief of the Georgian army, thus creating a new unified office of Atabeg-Amirspasalar. This high office was inherited by his son Avag Zakarian in 1227, and by Zakare III Zakarian in 1250. They resisted the invasions of the Khwarizmians of Jalal al-Din as well as the Mongol invasions of Georgia in 1221-1235, but the Mongol victors gave the office to the renegade Sadun of Mankaberd in 1272. In 1281, Demetrius II of Georgia blocked Sadun's son Khutlubuga from getting the office of atabeg, and instead promoted Tarsaich Orbelian of the Orbelians. Khutlubuga then conspired to have Demetrius II executed by the Mongols in 1289, and finally obtained the atabegate. The Zakarids recovered the office of atabeg in the early 14th century. From 1306, the office definitively went away from the Zakarids, as Sargis II Jaqeli was made Amirspasalar and Atabeg of the Kingdom of Georgia by his nephew, King George V "the Brilliant".

== Mongol and Later History ==
When the Khwarazmian Empire invaded the region, Dvin was ruled by the aging Ivane, who had given Ani to his nephew Shahnshah, son of Zakare. Dvin was lost, but Kars and Ani did not surrender. However, when Mongols took Ani in 1236, they had a friendly attitude towards the Zakarids. They confirmed Shanshe in his fief, and even added to it the fief of Avag, son of Ivane. Further, in 1243, they gave Akhlat to the princess Tamta, daughter of Ivane.

After the Mongols captured Ani in 1236, the Zakarids ruled not as vassals of the Bagratids, but rather the Mongols. The later kings of Zakarids continued their control over Ani until the 1360, when they lost to the Kara Koyunlu Turkoman tribes, who made Ani their capital.

In the 18th century the branch of the Zakarids–Mkhargrdzeli entered the ranks of the Russian Empire nobility and became known as Argutinsky-Dolgorukov.

== Genealogy ==
Zakarid family tree

Khosrov
Avag-Sargis	Karim
Zakare I
Sargis	Vahram
Zakare II	Nane (Inana)	Dopi (Shushan)	Tamta	Ivane	Zakare	Sargis
Shahnshah	Tamta	Avag	Vahram	Taki ad-Din
Artashir	Zakare III	Avag-Sargis	Ivane II	Zakarian	Agbugha	Beri; George	Khoshak	Agbugha	Sargis II
David	Shahnshah II	Vahram	Artashir	Agbugha	Zaza	Zakare	Vahram	Zakare	Ivane
Zakare	Shahnshah III

== Sources ==
- Sim, Steven. "The City of Ani: A Very Brief History". VirtualANI.
- Toumanoff, C. (2010). "KAMSARAKAN". In Yarshater, Ehsan (ed.). Encyclopædia Iranica. Vol. XV/5: Ḵamsa of Jamāli–Karim Devona. London and New York: Routledge & Kegan Paul. pp. 453–455. ISBN 978-1-934283-28-8.
