= Sargis II Tmogveli =

Sargis II Tmogveli (Georgian: სარგის თმოგველი) or Sargis of Tmogvi was a 13th century Georgian statesman and writer. Visramiani a medieval Georgian version of the old Iranian love story Vīs and Rāmīn, traditionally taken to have been rendered to him.

== Biography ==
Around 1246, Sargis was part of a failed plot aimed at overthrowing the Mongol hegemony, he survived arrest and torture in captivity that befell upon his fellow conspirators when their designs to stage a rebellion was betrayed to the Mongols. Exploiting the complicated issue of succession, the Mongols had the Georgian nobles divided into two rival parties, each of which advocated their own candidate to the crown. Sargis played an important role in having Prince David Ulu confirmed as co-ruler of Georgia. Following the coronation, David Ulu was sent to the Great Khan to receive an official recognition. King David Ulu made Sargis Tmogveli an escort for his journey to Karakorum. Sargis firmly opposed David Narin and those who were brought up with him, saying: "It is not proper for a woman's offspring to sit on the throne, which is a place of the son, an autocratic king - the son of a man."
