= Khosrov Zakarian =

Khosrov Zakarian (Armenian: Խոսրով Զաքարյան), also known as Khosrov Mkhargrdzeli (Georgian: ხოსრო მხარგრძელი), was an Armenian and Kurdish landholder during the 11th century in Armenian Kingdom of Tashir-Dzoraget and Kingdom of Georgia. Khosrov is first historically traceable member of Zakarids–Mkhargrdzeli dynasty.

== Biography ==
Khosrov was member of Zakarids–Mkhargrdzeli dynasty. Believed that Khosrov's ancestors belonged to Mesopotamian Kurdish tribe of Babir, or ancestry from Armenian Kamsarakan dynasty.

== Source ==
- Shoshiashvili, N. (1984). "მხარგრძელი ხოსრო (ხოსროვი)" (PDF). Georgian Soviet Encyclopedia (in Georgian). Vol. 7. Tbilisi. p. 272.
