= Zakare I Zakarian =

Zakare I Zakarian or Zakaria I Mkhargrdzeli was Armenian landholder in Kingdom of Georgia and vassal of Orbeli family during the 12th century. He belonged to the Zakarids–Mkhargrdzeli line.

He was the chief patron of the Haghpat Monastery.
