= Vakhtang II =

King of Georgia from 1289 to 1292

King of Georgia
- Reign: 1289–1292
- Predecessor: Demetrius II
- Successor: David VIII
- Died: 1292
- Burial: Gelati Monastery
- Spouse: Oljath
- Dynasty: Bagrationi
- Father: David VI
- Mother: Tamar Amanelisdze
- Religion: Georgian Orthodox Church

Vakhtang II (Georgian: ვახტანგ II; died 1292), of the dynasty of Bagrationi, was king (mepe) of the Kingdom of Eastern Georgia from 1289 to 1292.

After the execution of Demetrius II of Georgia, Vakhtang was appointed king by Arghun on the advice of Khutlubuga, with the expectation that this would unify Georgia under Mongol rule. Vakhtang firmly assumed control of the kingdom and did not allow Khutlubuga to act arbitrarily, which led to hostility between them. Khutlubuga then opposed Vakhtang by supporting Demetrius II’s son, David, but this effort was unsuccessful. Vakhtang II died unexpectedly and was buried at Gelati.

== Biography ==
Vakhtang was the son of King David VI Narin, ruler of Western Georgia, and his first wife Tamar Amanelisdze. He was designated as co-ruler and heir to his father’s throne. According to the Chronicles, Vakhtang was educated by a scholar, the son of a man named Parsman.

Vakhtang is first mentioned in historical sources in 1287–1288, when he confirmed a charter of loyalty granted by David Narin to the elder of Zardakhan, Vakhtang Tulaishvili. In this document, Vakhtang is referred to as “king,” indicating his status as co-regent. The charter is dated to the 10th indiction of his reign, suggesting that he had been appointed co-ruler alongside his father in 1279.

Following the death of Demetrius II, he was appointed to the throne of eastern Georgia by Arghun, acting on the advice of Khutlubuga, son of Sadun Mankaberdi, with the aim of bringing both Georgian kingdoms under Mongol authority. The Khan instructed: “Bring the son of the Abkhazian king David, named Vakhtang, and grant him the kingship, so that both kingdoms shall obey your command.” Khutlubuga then traveled to Imereti and offered David VI the proposal for Vakhtang’s accession in eastern Georgia. David escorted his son with an army to Tashiskari, where Vakhtang was received by Georgian and Mongol nobles, who swore allegiance to him. David subsequently returned to Kutaisi, while Vakhtang was taken to Arghun to be officially presented and confirmed as king.

Arghun conferred upon Vakhtang “the kingship over all of Georgia” and gave him his sister, Oljath, in marriage. Upon returning to Tbilisi, Vakhtang was formally crowned and enthroned: “He was placed on the royal seat of the kingdom, and the rites of coronation were completed. He ruled over all of Georgia from Nicopsia to Darband.” However, his authority did not extend to all regions, as he did not have control over the immediate vassal of the Khan, Beka I Jaqeli, the ruler of Samtskhe.

The Chronicles describe Vakhtang as “honorable, God-fearing, gentle and just, courageous and wise, and filled with the understanding of all three realms.”

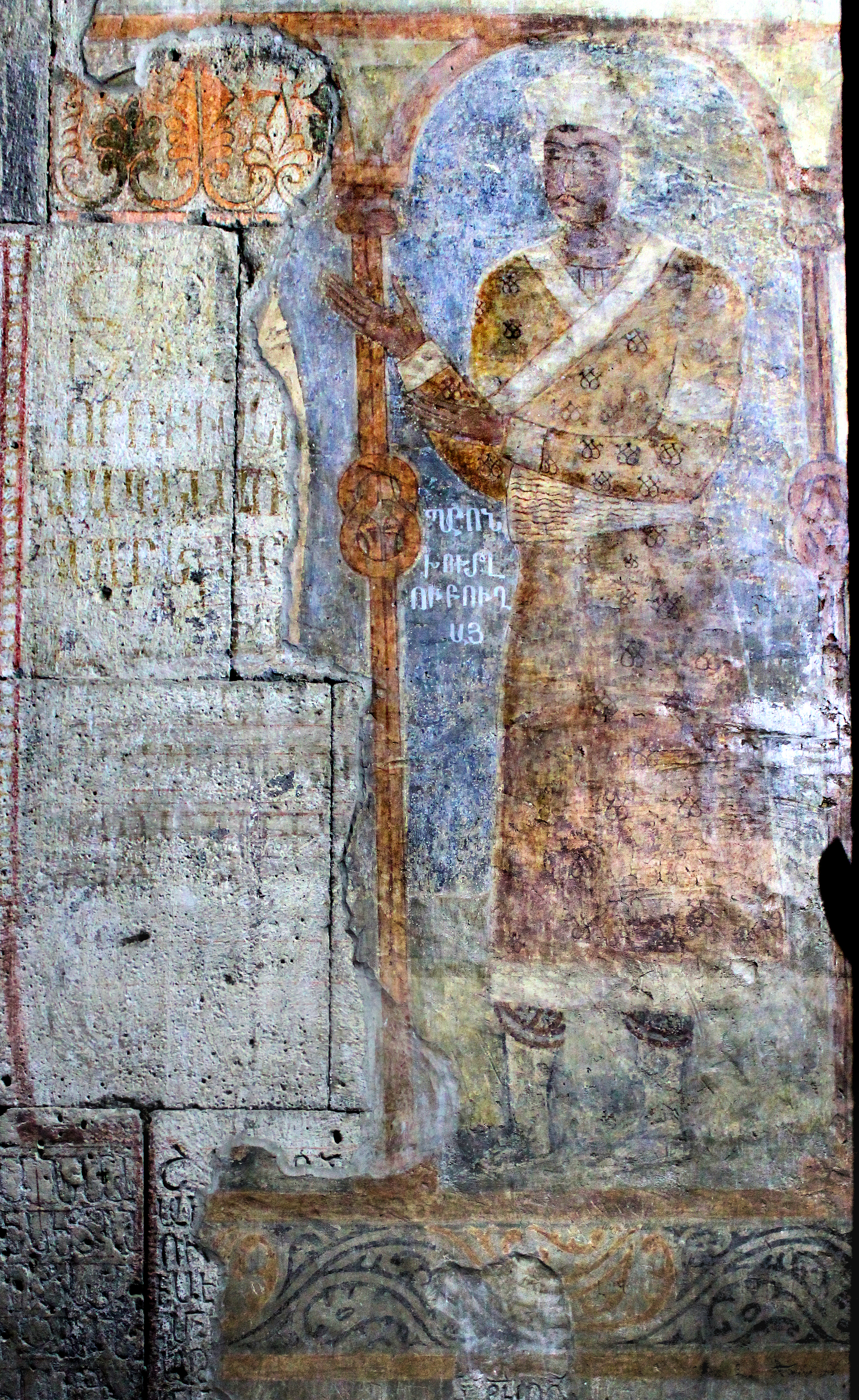
Khutlubuga. Church of the Holy Sign. Haghpat Monastery, southern wall. Late 13th century.

For his role in Vakhtang’s enthronement, Khutlubuga was rewarded with the titles of Atabeg and Amirspasalar. Before long, however, he attempted to take advantage of the serious illness of Vakhtang’s patron, Arghun, by promoting the candidacy of Demetrius II’s eldest son, David, as king. Georgian nobles and Mongol noyons, however, rallied to Vakhtang’s side, and Khutlubuga’s plans collapsed.

After Arghun’s death in 1291, Khutlubugha again attempted to challenge Vakhtang’s position but was once more unsuccessful. The new Khan, Gaykhatu, expressed clear favor toward Vakhtang, enabling him to retain a firm hold on the throne. David, by contrast, was left with only a small share of “scattered villages and lands.”

Vakhtang II reigned for only three years before his premature death in 1292, at a young age. His body was taken to western Georgia and buried at the Gelati Monastery. After his death, David, son of Demetrius II, was confirmed as king of Georgia by the Ilkhan, who also arranged for him to marry Vakhtang’s widow, Oljath.

== Bibliography ==
- Lortkipanidze, Mariam; Japaridze, Otar; Muskhelishvili, David; Metreveli, Roin (2012). History of Georgia in four volumes, vol. II - History of Georgia from the 4th century to the 13th century. Tbilisi: National Academy of Sciences of Georgia. ISBN 978-9941-19-585-3.

Preceded by Demetrius II	King of Georgia; 1289–1292	Succeeded by David VIII
