= Oljath =

Queen of Georgia from 1289 to 1302

Queen consort of Georgia
- Tenure: 1289–1292; 1292–1302
- Spouse: Vakhtang II (m. 1289; died 1292) David VIII (m. 1292; div. 1302) Qara Sonqur (m. 1314)
- House: Borjigin
- Father: Abaqa Khan
- Mother: Maria Palaiologina or Bulujin egechi

Oljath (Öljätäi; Georgian: ოლჯათი, romanized: oljati; fl. 1289–1314) was a Queen consort of Georgia as the wife of two successive kings, Vakhtang II (r. 1289–1292) and David VIII (r. 1292–1311). She was the daughter of Abaqa Khan, the Mongol Ilkhan of Iran.

== Origin ==
Oljath was a younger daughter of Abaqa Khan. Her mother was either Abaqa's wife Maria Palaiologina, an illegitimate daughter of the Byzantine emperor Michael VIII Palaiologos, or Bulujin egechi, a concubine. She was, thus, a great-great-granddaughter of Genghis Khan.

== First marriage ==
The anonymous 14th-century Chronicle of a Hundred Years, part of the Georgian Chronicles, relates that, after having Demetrius II of Georgia put to death in 1289, the Ilkhan Arghun sent the influential Georgian nobleman Khutlubuga to David I of Imereti, an uncle of the executed monarch, bidding him to send his son Vakhtang, whom he intended to put on the throne of Georgia, and to give him his sister Oljath in marriage. Vakhtang's reign was short-lived and he died in 1292, without known issue.

== Second marriage ==
After the death of her husband, Oljath married, with the consent of the Ilkhan, Vakhtang's cousin and successor, David VIII, a son of Demetrius II. David soon raised a rebellion against the Mongol hegemony and entrenched himself in the mountains of Mtiuleti. In 1298, Oljath was part of the delegation sent by David for negotiations with the Mongol commander Kutlushah, who treated the queen with special honor, she being a Mongol princess. Oljath was given assurances for the king's safety, as well as the ring and the napkin, the latter being a gage of pardon, while Sibuchi, son of Kutlushah, was offered as a hostage. The queen, however, was detained and, after David refused to arrive at negotiations in person, carried off to Iran. The Ilkhan determined that she should not again return to her husband. When David learned this, he, in 1302, married the daughter of Hamada Surameli. No children are reported in the medieval annals from the union of Oljath with David, but a modern hypothesis makes Melchizedek and Andronicus, the 13th-century princes of Alastani, known from the contemporaneous documents, their sons.

== Third marriage ==
Oljath's grand-nephew Öljaitü briefly took Damascus from the Mamluks in 1312. It was when Mamluk emirs, former governor of Aleppo - Shams al-Din Qara Sonqur and governor of Tripoli - al-Afram defected to Öljaitü. Despite extradition requests from Egypt, ilkhan invested Qara Sonqur (now under the new name - Aq Sonqur) with the governorate of Maragheh and al-Afram with Hamadan. Qara Sonqur was given the hand of Oljath on 17 January 1314 in exchange of a dowry worth 30.000 dinars. Qara Sonqur was killed by Abu Sa'id in 1328 in exchange of Timurtash's execution in 1327. Oljath's further life is unknown.

== Notes ==
Royal titles
Preceded by Natela Jaqeli	Queen consort of Georgia; 1289–1302	Succeeded by Princess Surameli
