= Sadun Artsruni =

Sadun III Artsruni Mankaberdeli Սադուն Բ Արծրունի

Atabeg and Amirspasalar of Georgia
- In office 1272–1282
- Preceded by: Ivane III Abuletisdze
- Succeeded by: Khutlubuga

Personal details
- Died: 1282
- Children: Khutlubuga

Sadun Artsruni, also Sadun of Mankaberd (Georgian: სადუნ მანკაბერდელი; Armenian: Սադուն Բ Արծրունի) of the House of the Artsrunids, was an Armenian prince, Prince of Haghbat and Mankaberd. He was a court official and became Atabeg (Governor General) and Amirspasalar (Commander-in-Chief of the army) of the Kingdom of Eastern Georgia, and later chamberlain of Avag's daughter Khoshak. He was concurrently "Prime Minister" of the Mongol Il-Khan Abaqa.

== Biography ==
Sadun was a great-grandson of Amir K'urd (Abulasan), governor of Tbilisi during Queen Tamar's reign in Georgia. In 1258, Sadun won a wrestling match in front of the Mongol ruler Hulegu Khan, who gave him the title of Tarkhan. Sadun then accompanied Hulegu in his military campaigns in Syria in 1259, in the conquest of Sasun, and in the capture of the citadel of Aleppo. He was then awarded the district of Sasun from Hulegu.

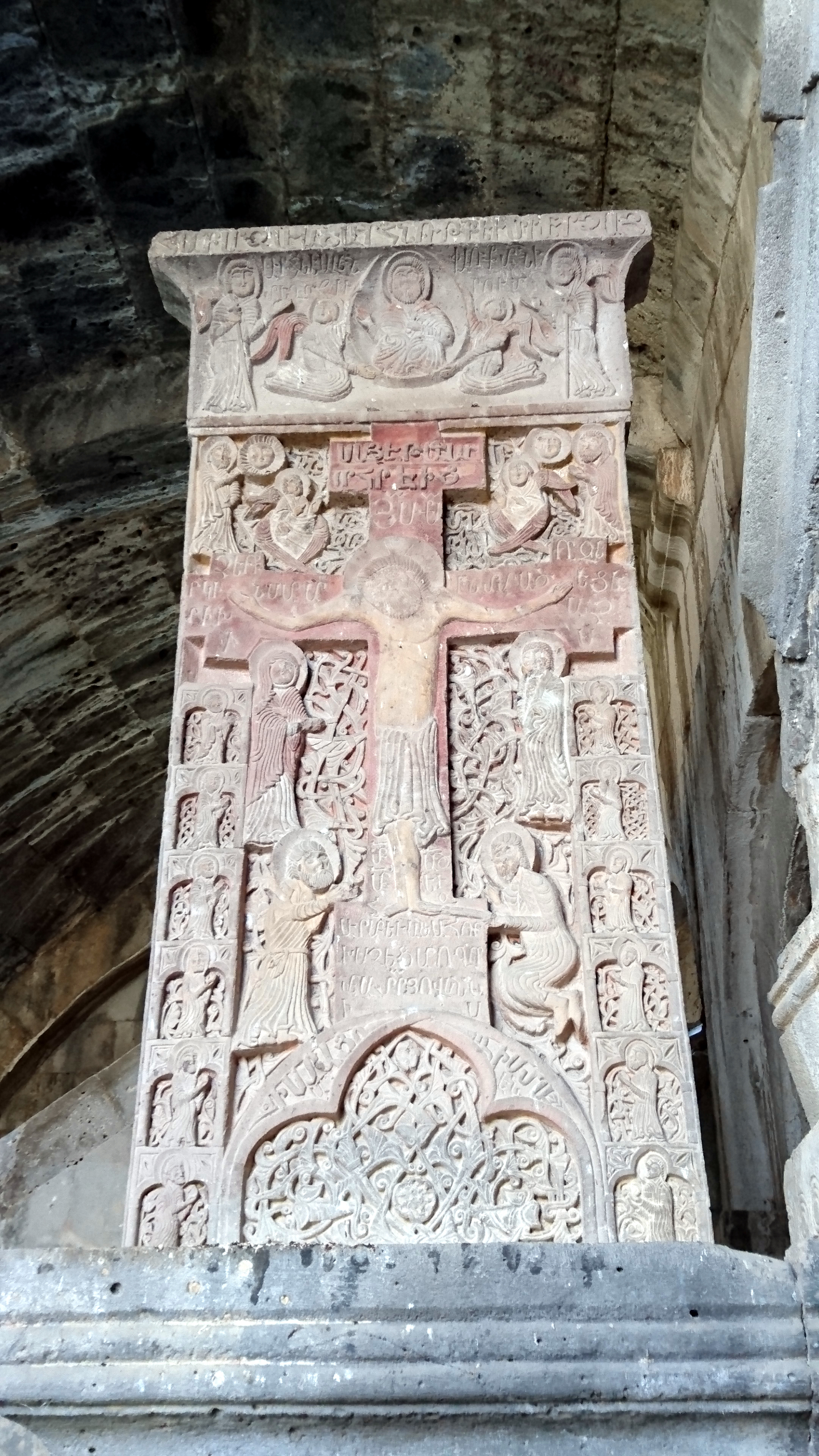
Figural Khatchkar cross of Sadun Artsruni, Haghpat Monastery, 1273.

Throughout the 13th century, the high offices Atabeg (Governor General) and Amirspasalar (Commander-in-Chief of the Georgian army) had been held by the Zakarids, but following the Mongol invasions of Georgia the Mongol victors gave these offices to the "renegade" Sadun of Mankaberd in 1272. When Abaqa became the new Mongol ruler, Sadun received from him the title of Atabeg Amirspasalar for the Georgian Bagratid Kingdom. He was said to be close to the Mongols, and had been promoted by them: "Sadun Artsruni was appointed as atabeg of Georgia by Abaqa Khan". In his position, he especially controlled the policies of Eastern Georgia, which, while being ruled by Demetrius II, remained pro-Mongol throughout. Sadun was also awarded control of the royal domains of Telavi, Belakani and Kars, and acquired Dmanisi from Demetrius II. His estate in Georgian Armenia was next to that of the Zakarids.

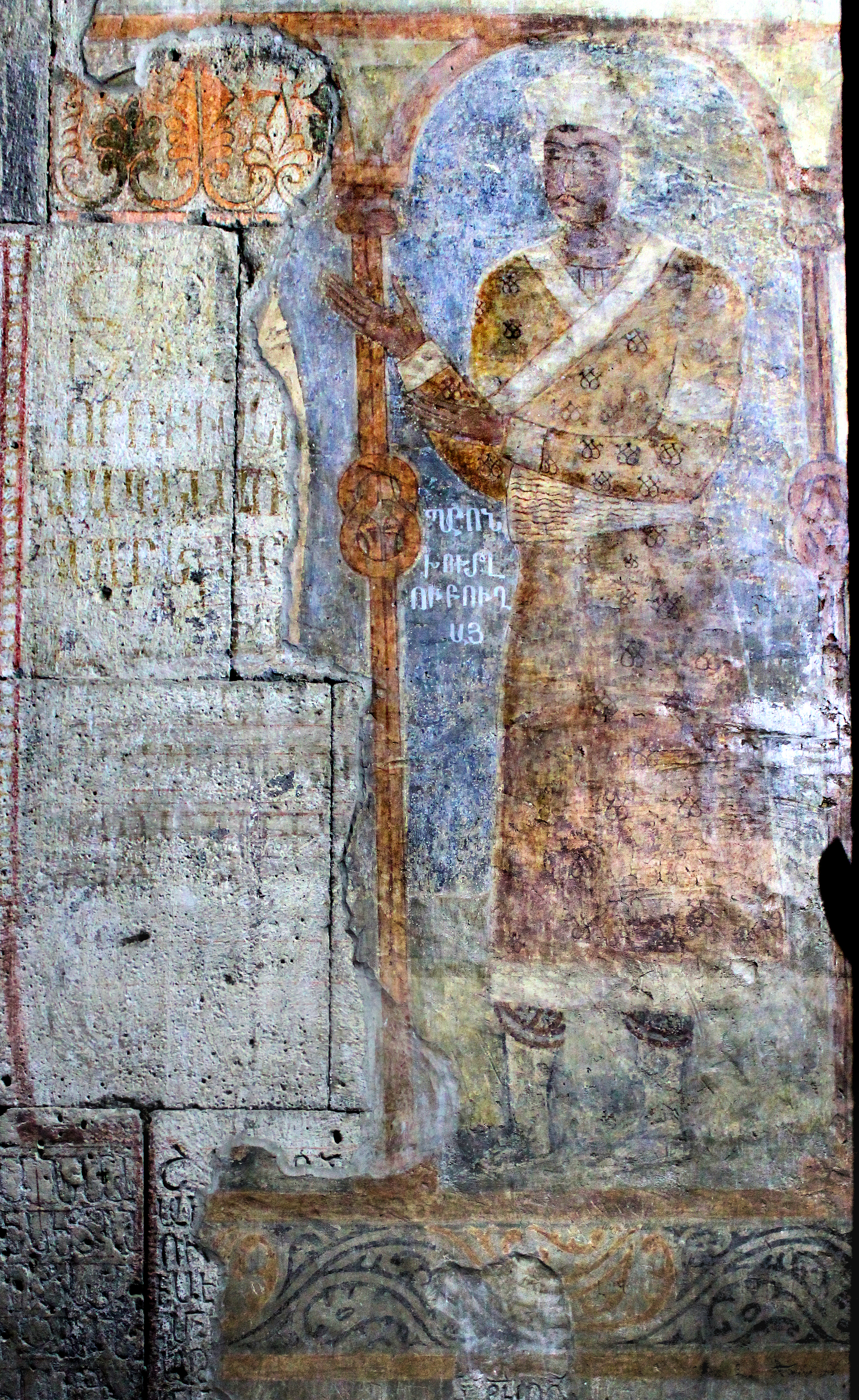
Khutlubuga, son of Sadun Artsruni. Church of the Holy Sign. Haghpat Monastery, southern wall. Late 13th century.

The rise of Sadun exemplifies the way the Mongol maintained control over the Georgian territory, by maintaining the original kingship within the original Bagratid family, through the offices of the atabegi and the amir-spasarali, given to those who were collaborating with them.

He was an acquaintance of Shams al-Din Juvayni, a vizier in the service of the Mongols, and organized his marriage with Khoshak, daughter of Avag Zakarian, whom he had had under his supervision.

Sadun married the daughter of Xoja Aziz, a powerful Persian official active in the administration of Georgia. Sadun died in 1282, and his title of Amirspasalar was transmitted to his son Khutlubuga. However, Demetrius II of Georgia blocked Sadun's son Khutlubuga from getting the office of atabeg, and instead promoted Tarsaich Orbelian of the Orbelians.

== Sources ==
- Kitagawa, Sei-ichi'. The Rise of the Artsrunisand the rl-Kha-nid Rule over Georgia. The Historical Society of Japan.
- Dashdondog, Bayarsaikhan (2020). Armenian Lords and Mongol Court. Conference: Armenology in Mongolia.
- Dashdondog, Bayarsaikhan (2011). The Mongols and the Armenians (1220-1335) (PDF). Brill. ISBN 978-90-04-18635-4.
