= Khutlubuga =

Armenian prince

Khutlubuga Խութլու Բուղա Արծրունի
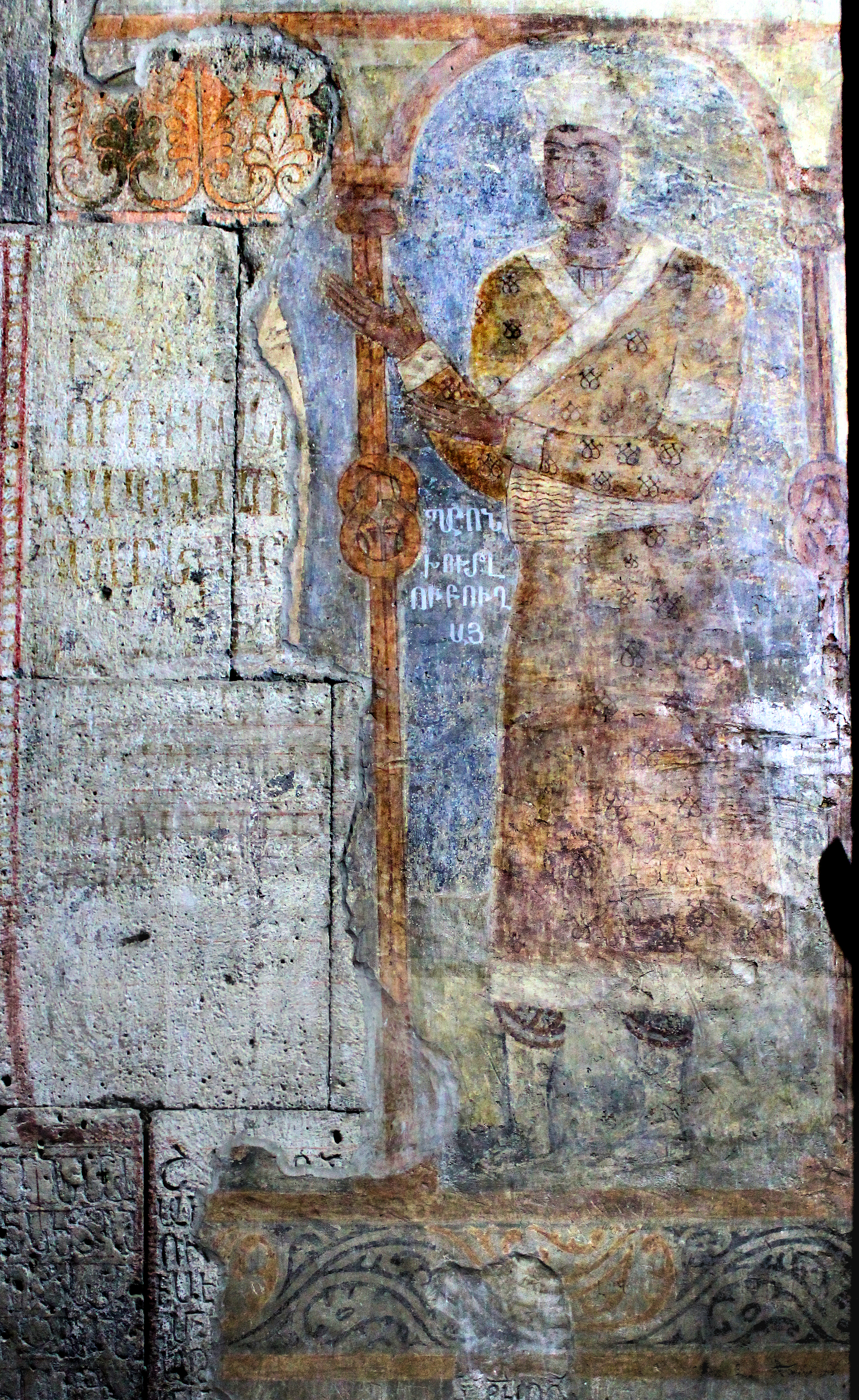
- Khutlubuga. Church of the Holy Sign. Haghpat Monastery, southern wall. Late 13th century.

Amirspasalar
- In office 1270–1293
- Preceded by: Sadun Mankaberdeli
- Succeeded by: Shahnshah II Zakarian

Atabeg
- In office 1292–1293
- Preceded by: Tarsaich Orbelian
- Succeeded by: Shahnshah II Zakarian

Personal details
- Died: 1293
- Parent: Sadun Mankaberdeli

Khutlubuga (Armenian: Խութլու Բուղա), also Khutlu Buga or Qutlugh Buqa (Georgian: ხუტლუბუღა; died August, 1293), was an Armenian prince of the House of the Artsrunids, and a court official of the Kingdom of Eastern Georgia in the second half of the 13th century, the son of Atabeg-Amirspasalar Sadun Mankaberdeli. He himself became Amirspasalar (Commander-in-Chief) of the Georgian army, and for a short time towards the end of his life Atabeg (Governor General of Georgia). He also received the title of Paron (derived from the Crusader title "Baron") from the Armenian Kingdom of Cilicia. Khutlubuga and his father Sadun were attached the name of Artsruni in Armenian texts (after the name of their dynasty), and Mankaberdeli in Georgian ones (after the name of their territory).

After the Mongol ruler Arghun executed the Georgian king Demetrius II, Khutlubuga collaborated with Arghun for the selection of the next king Vakhtang II.

== Biography ==
Through a designation by the Mongols, Khutlubuga's father Sadun had been the regent (Atabeg) and Commander-in-Chief (Amirspasalar) for the young Demetrius II of Georgia when he succeeded his father on the throne in 1270 at the age of 11 years old. After the death of Sadun, King Demetrius II denied Khutlubuga the position of Atabeg to succeed his father Sadun, and only gave him the position of Amirspasalar, and made him a sworn enemy. Demetrius II gave Atabeg to Tarsaich Orbelian, because of which Khutlubuga turned against the king (it was also added that he was the grandson of Khoja Aziz, who was executed by David VII Ulu, on his mother's side).

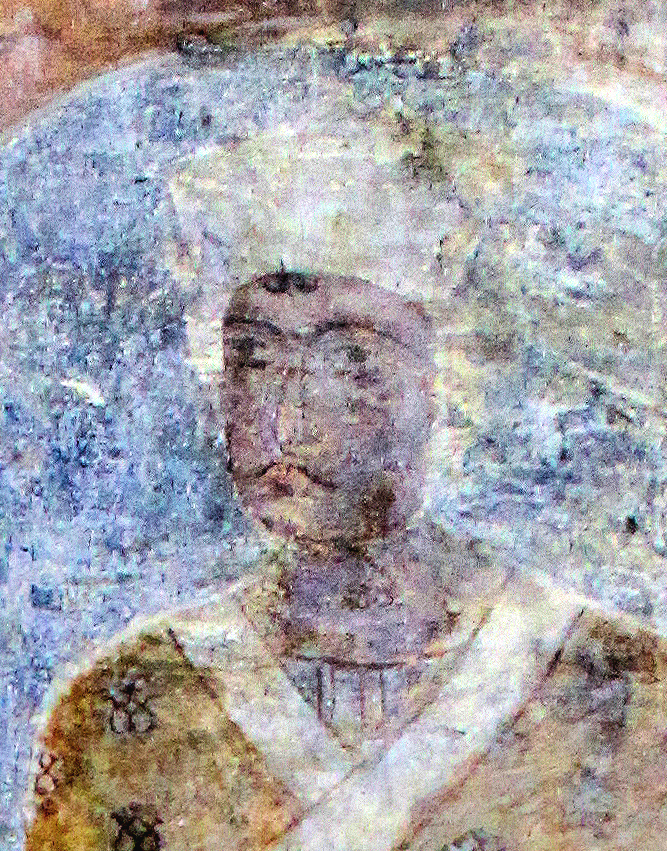
Portrait of Khutlubuga

Khutlubuga contributed to the fact that Demetrius was executed by the Mongol horde (1289), and Vakhtang II (r.1289–1292), the son of David VI Narin, was placed on the royal throne by Arghun, who in return gave Khutlubuga the abdication and amirship. Khutlubuga was a proud, arrogant and disobedient man by nature. He was deprived of his Sadun property and estate several times, and after repenting of his crime, it was returned to him again. Soon he stood up to Vakhtang and tried to enthrone Prince David, the son of Demetrius, who was at the court of Mongolian Ilkhan. The Georgian nobles did not support Khutlubuga and he was forced to remain in the Horde.

Finally, after the premature death of Vakhtang II and the accession of David, the son of Demetrius (1293), as David VIII of Georgia (r. 1292–1302), Khutlubuga became so powerful that, according to the historian, he behaved like a king. David VIII was forced to turn to Ilkhan Gaykhatu. Khutlubuga was reminded of all his crimes and sentenced to death. He had no children and all his property was left to David VIII.

Khutlubuga was a patron for the murals at the Church of the Holy Sign, in the Haghpat Monastery, probably during his time as Amirspasalar in the 1280s. He appears in person, with the inscription of his name. He wear a wrap-around caftan with decorative inserts, and has a low triangular headgear. This is a very useful marker for the clothing styles and for the dating of works of art of the period. They are contemporary with the mural at Kobayr.

He was brother-in-law with Prosh Khaghbakian, whose wife was named "Khutlu Khatun".
