= Haghpat Monastery =

Cultural heritage monument of Armenia

- Հաղպատավանք
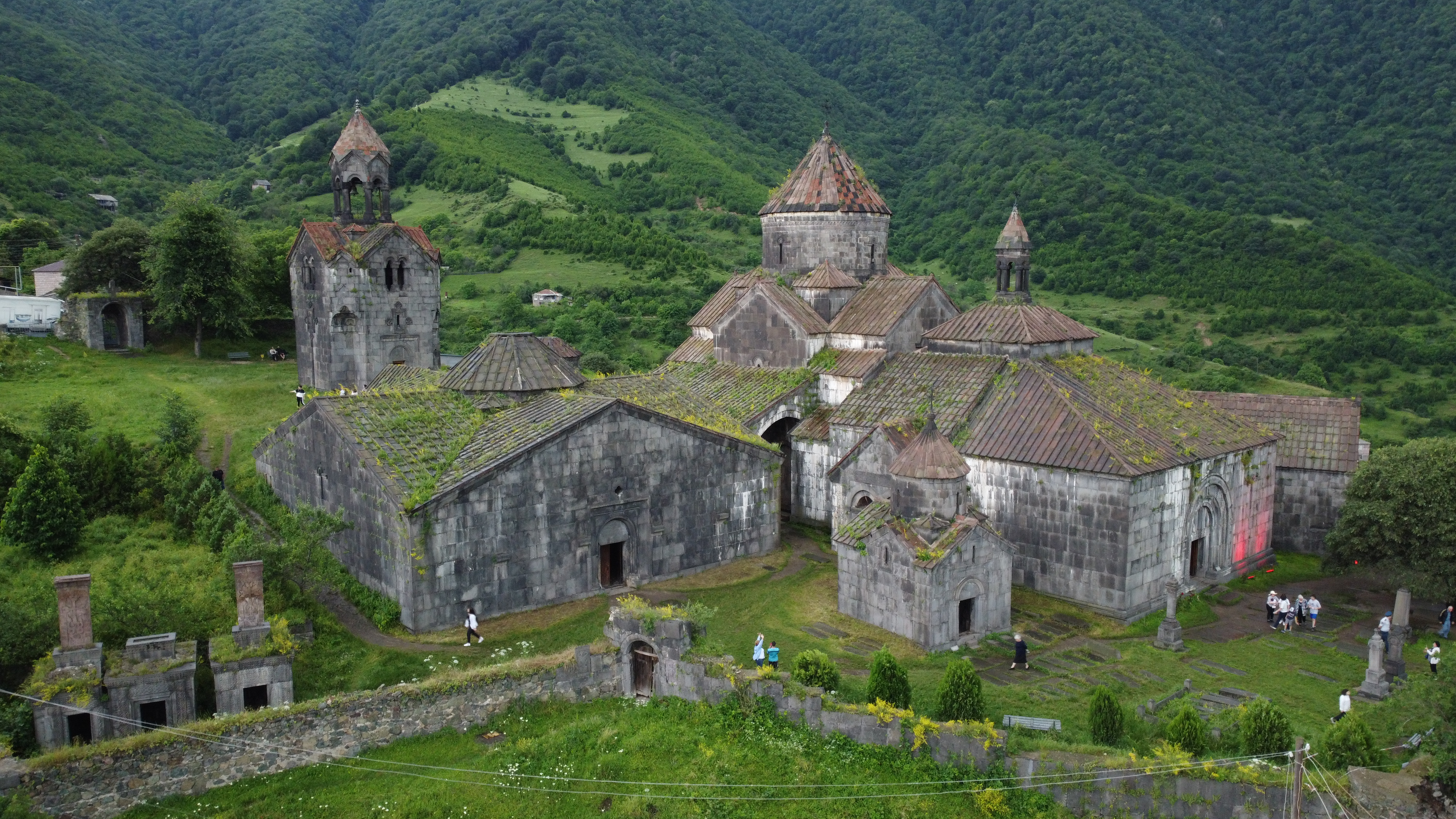
- An aerial view of the monastery

- Location within Armenia

Religion
- Affiliation: Armenian Apostolic Church
- Rite: Armenian Apostolic Church

Location
- Location: Haghpat, Lori Province, Armenia
- Coordinates: 41.093889°N 44.711944°E

Architecture
- Style: Armenian
- Groundbreaking: 10th century
- UNESCO World Heritage Site
- Official name: Monasteries of Haghpat and Sanahin
- Type: Cultural
- Criteria: ii, iv
- Designated: 1996 (20th session)
- Reference no.: 777-001
- UNESCO Region: Western Asia

Haghpat Monastery, also known as Haghpatavank (Armenian: Հաղպատավանք), is a medieval Armenian monastery complex in Haghpat, Armenia, built between the 10th and 13th century.

== Location ==
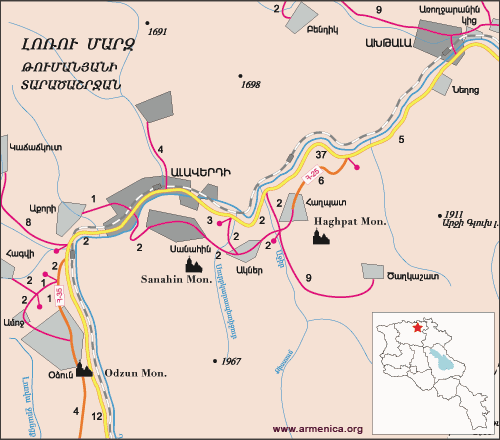
Road map of the Haghpat-Sanahin area

The location of Haghpat Monastery was chosen so that it overlooks the Debed River in northern Armenia's Lori region. It was built partway up a hillside on a site chosen to afford protection and concealment while inconspicuous. It is built on a fertile promontory in the Javakheti Range. The monastery is not isolated and is surrounded by many hamlets.

== History and description ==
The monastery was founded by Queen Khosrovanuysh, wife of the Bagratid king Ashot III, probably in 976. The nearby monastery at Sanahin was built around the same time.

=== Construction ===
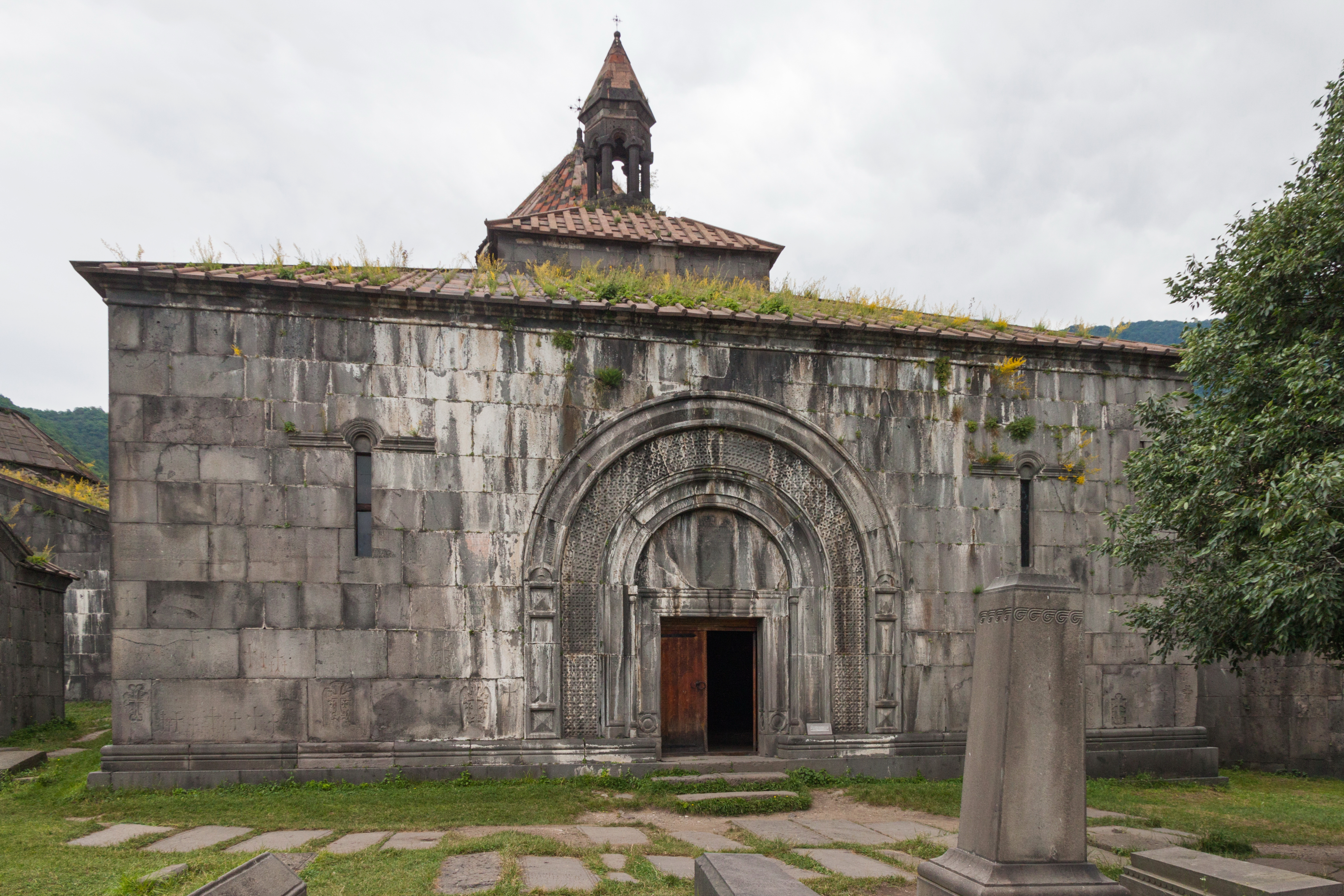
Gavit

==== Cathedral of Surb Nshan ====
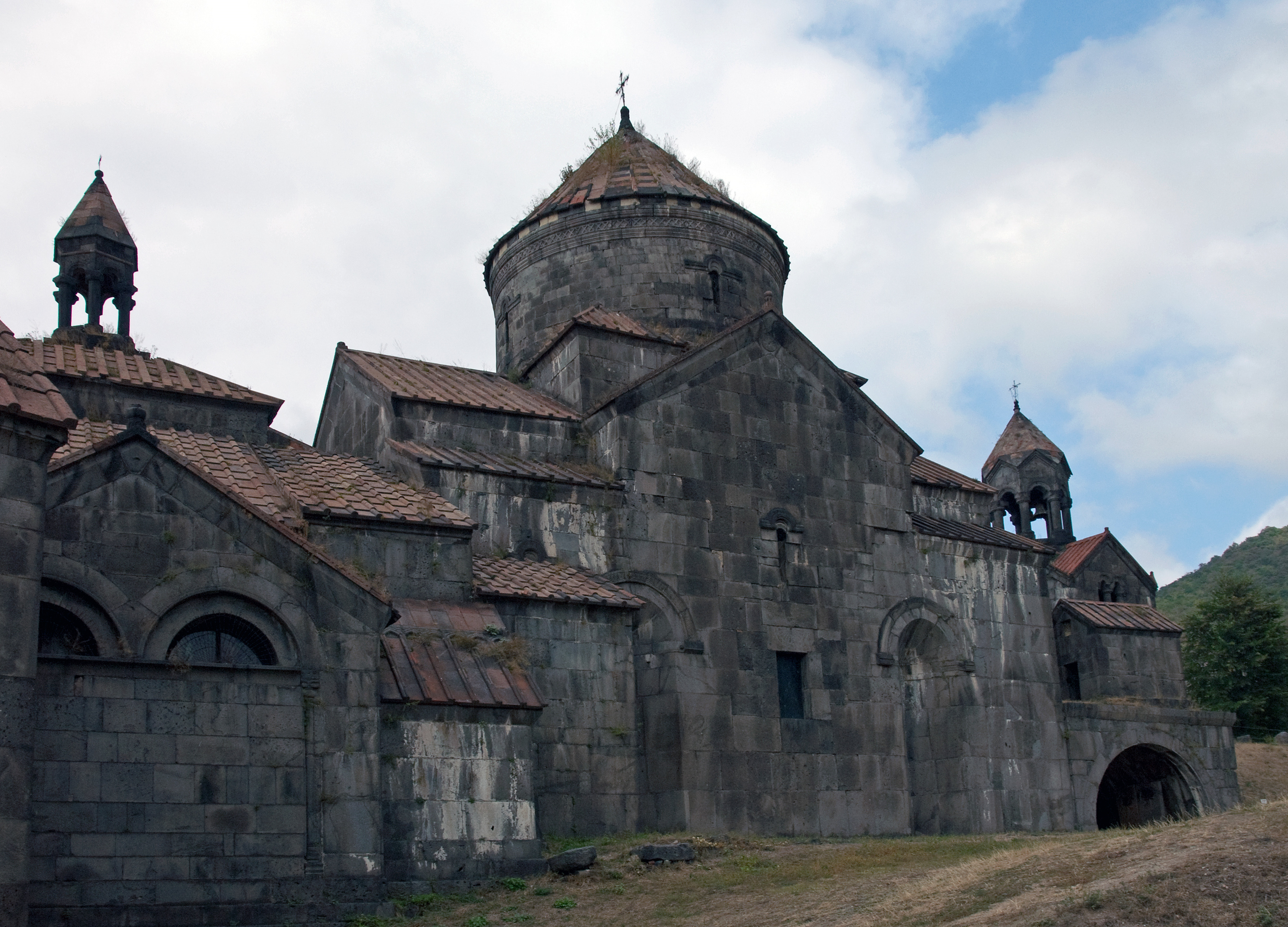

The largest church in the complex, the Cathedral of Surb Nshan, was probably begun in 967–976 by Queen Khosrovanuysh, wife of Ashot III, and completed in 991 by King Smbat II. It is a typical example of tenth-century Armenian architecture, its central dome rests on the four large pillars of the lateral walls. The outside walls are dotted with triangular recesses. A fresco in the apse depicts Christ Pantocrator. Its donor, the Armenian Prince Khutulukhaga, is depicted in the south transept (a transversal nave intersecting the main nave). The sons of the church's founder, Princes Smbat and Kurike, are shown with Queen Khosravanuysh in a bas-relief on the east gable.

==== Other structures ====
The small domed Church of Sourb Grigor (St. Gregory) is from 1005. Two side chapels were added to the original church; the larger one built in the beginning of the 13th century and the smaller, known as "Hamazasp House", built in 1257. In 1245, a three-story tall free-standing belltower was constructed. Other 13th-century additions include the chapel of Sourb Astvatsatsin, a library and scriptorium (later converted into a storeroom), and a large refectory (which is outside monastery limits).

There are also a number of khachkars (cross-stones) of the 11th-13th centuries standing in monastery grounds, best known among them is the "Amenaprkich" (All-Savior) khachkar which has been standing since 1273.

=== Crusades ===
In 1260, Prosh Khaghbakian, with his Armenian Zakarid suzerains Avag and Shahnshah, led a large force of Georgians and Armenians to support the much smaller force of Mongol troops of Hulegu in the Siege of Mayyafariqin, which was defended by Ayyubid ruler Al-Kamil Muhammad. The Armenian Prince Sevata of Kachen was killed in the conflict. When the city was captured after two years of siege, the Muslims were massacred, but the Christians were spared. Christian relics were collected and brought back to Armenia, many to the Haghpat Monastery, which received the hand of the Apostle St Bartholomew.

=== Survival throughout history ===
The monastery has been damaged many times. Sometime around 1130, an earthquake destroyed parts of Haghpat Monastery, and it was not restored until fifty years later. The monastery also suffered numerous attacks by armed forces in the centuries of its existence, and was damaged by another major earthquake in 1988. Nevertheless, much of the complex is still intact and stands today without substantial alterations.

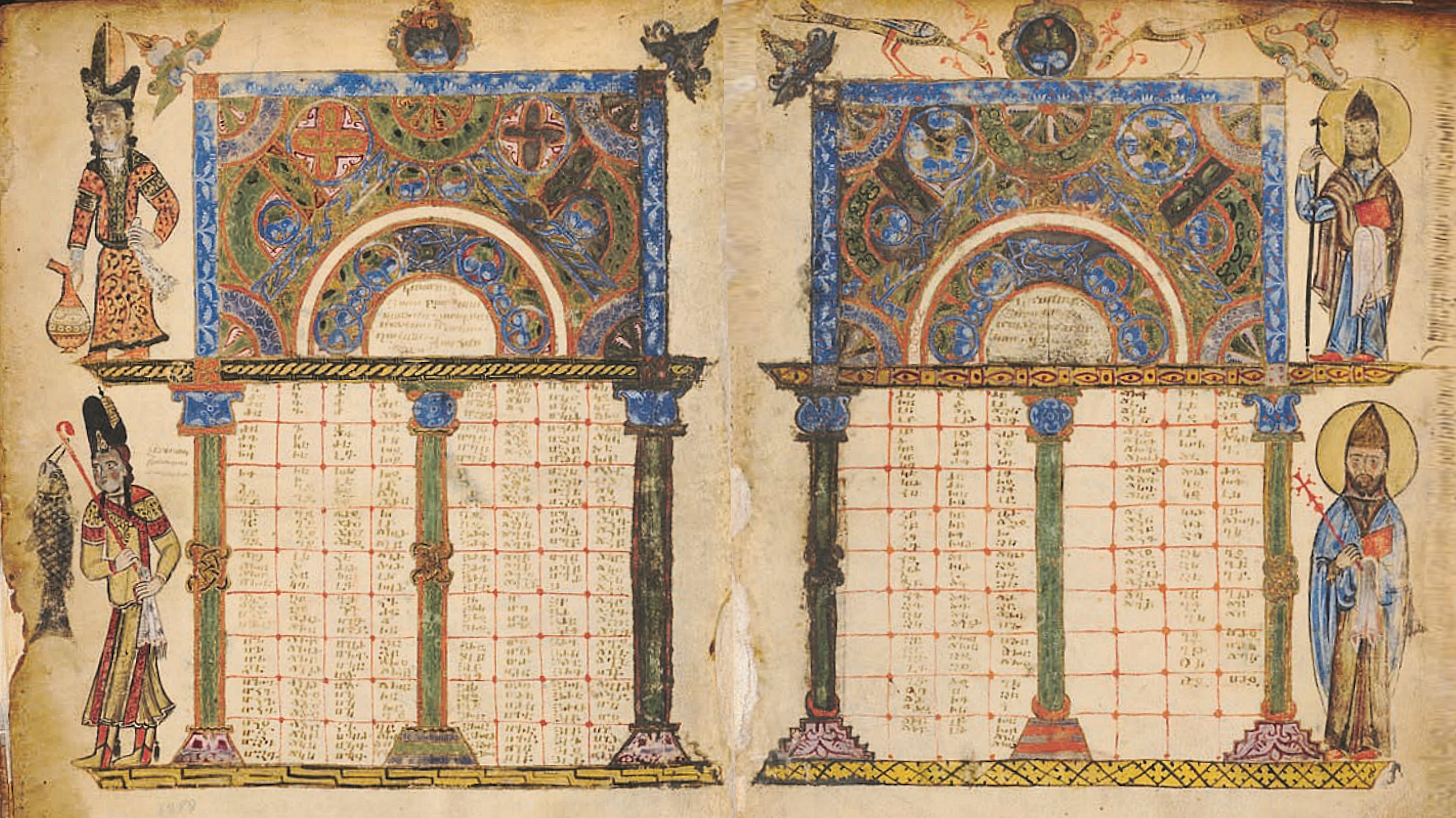
Canon tables from the Haghbat Gospels, created at Horomos Monastery and given to the Haghpat Monastery soon after; 1211 (Matendaran, MS 6288, fols. 8v–9r).

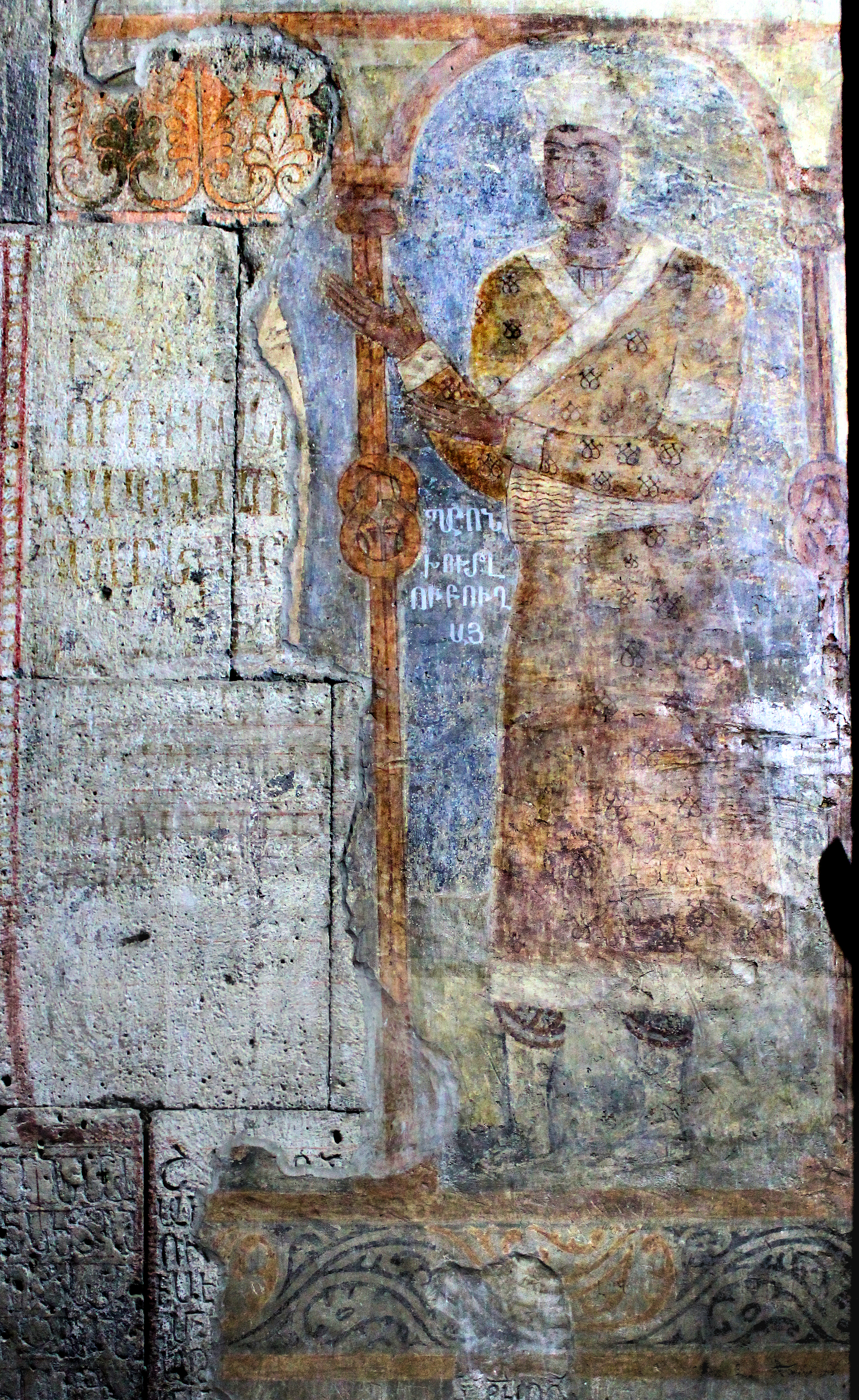
Mural representing Khutlubuga. Church of the Holy Sign. Haghpat Monastery, southern wall. Late 13th century.

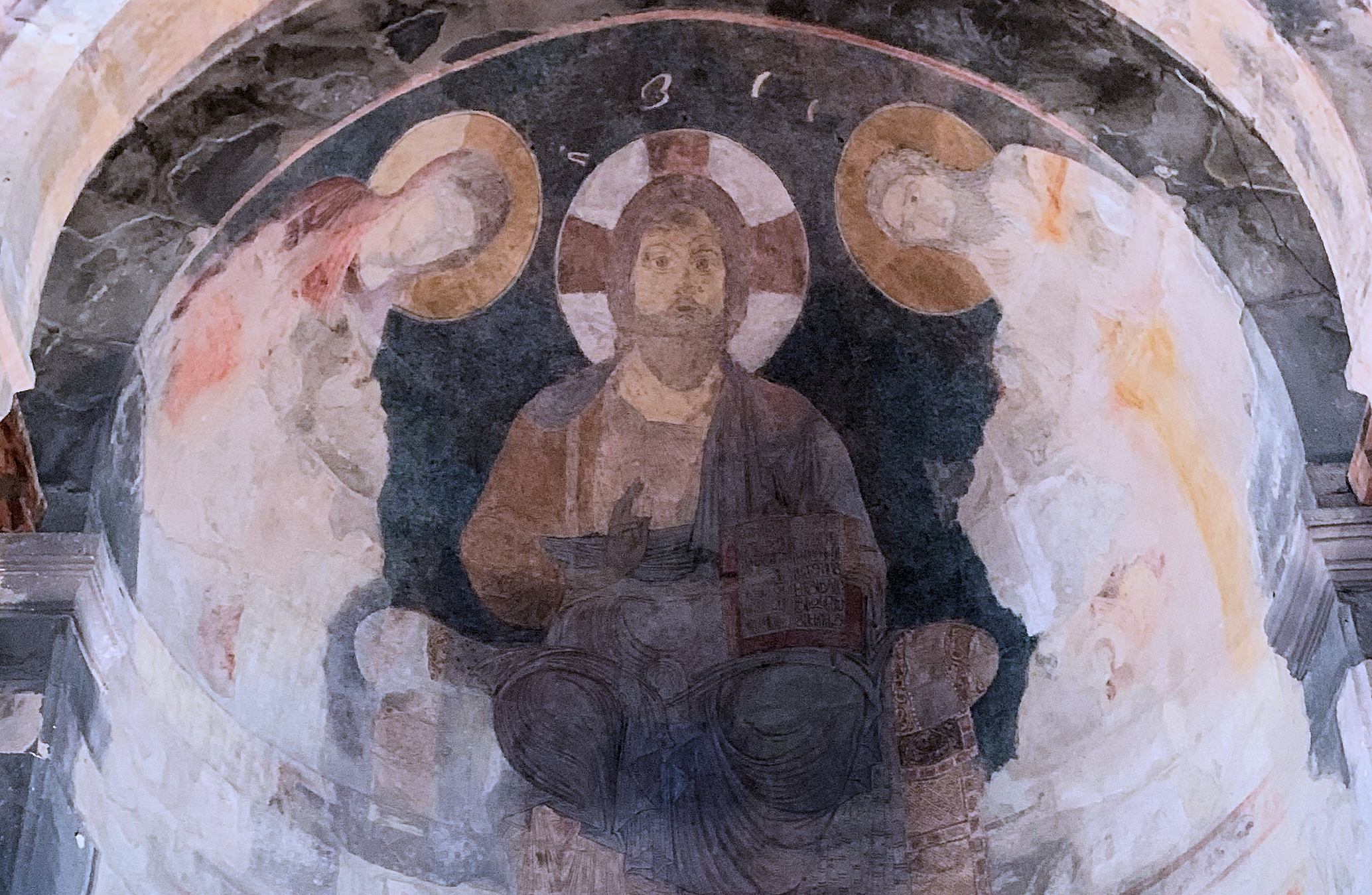
Deesis. Church of the Holy Sign. Haghpat Monastery. Wall painting in the semi-dome. Early 13th century.

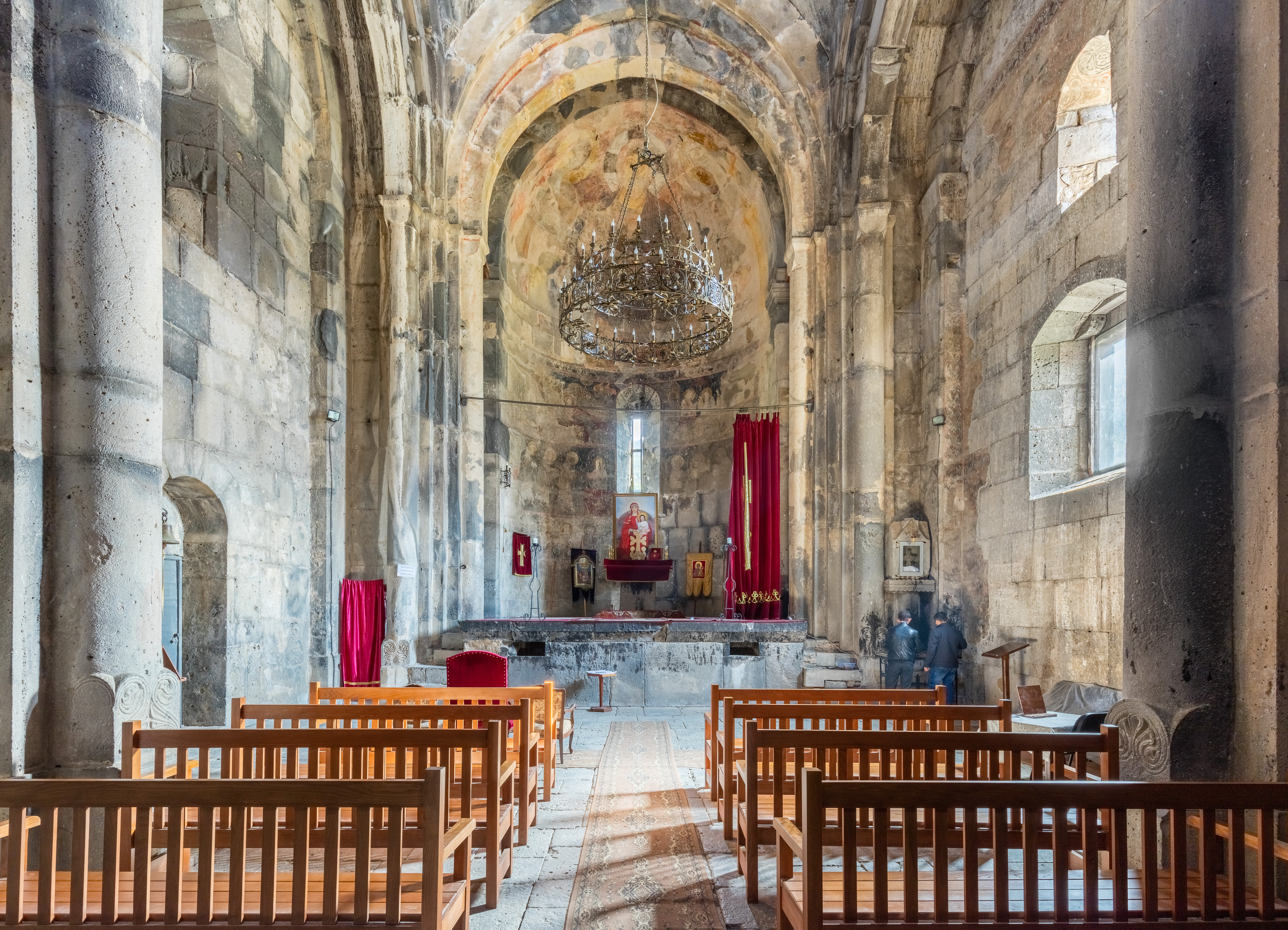
Church interior, nave and altar

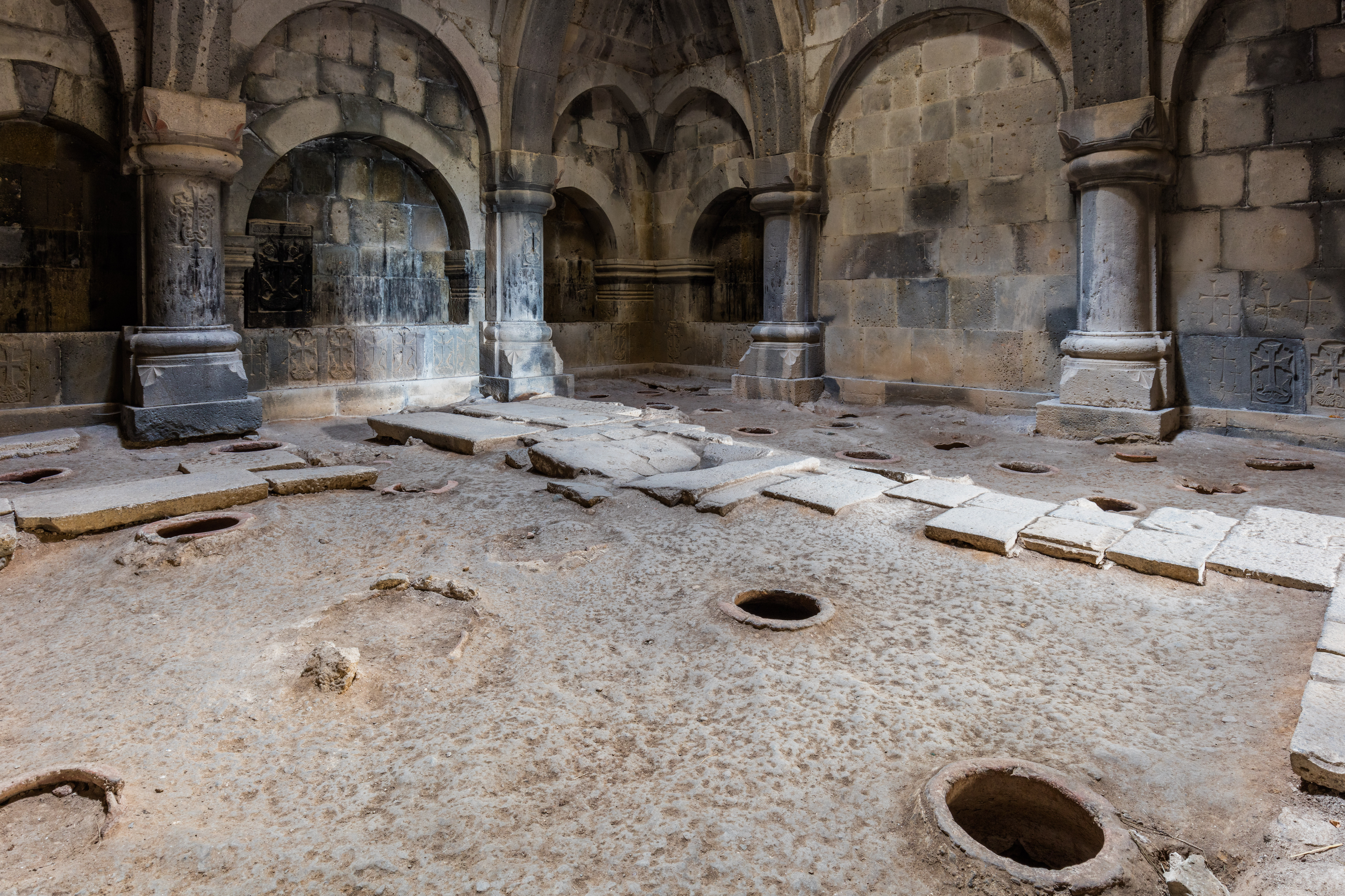
Library and scriptorium (storage jars were later inserted into the floor)

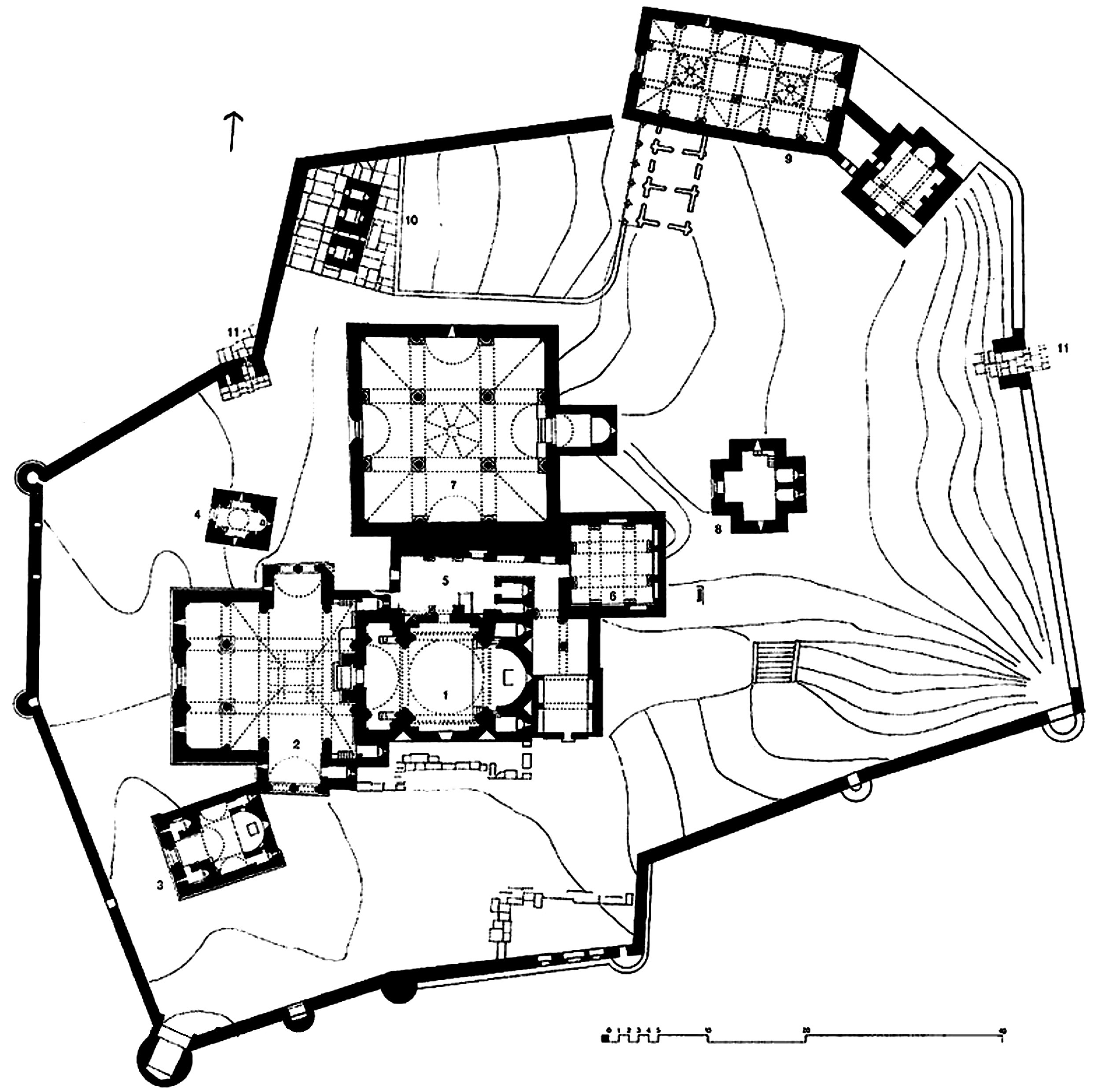
Plan of Haghpat

== UNESCO World Heritage Listing ==
Described as a "masterpiece of religious architecture and a major center of learning in the Middle Ages", Haghpat Monastery, together with Sanahin Monastery, was placed on UNESCO's World Heritage List in 1996. The monasteries at Haghpat and Sanahin were chosen as UNESCO World Heritage Sites because:

The two monastic complexes represent the highest flowering of Armenian religious architecture, whose unique style developed from a blending of elements of Byzantine ecclesiastical architecture and the traditional vernacular architecture of the Caucasian region.

== Gallery ==
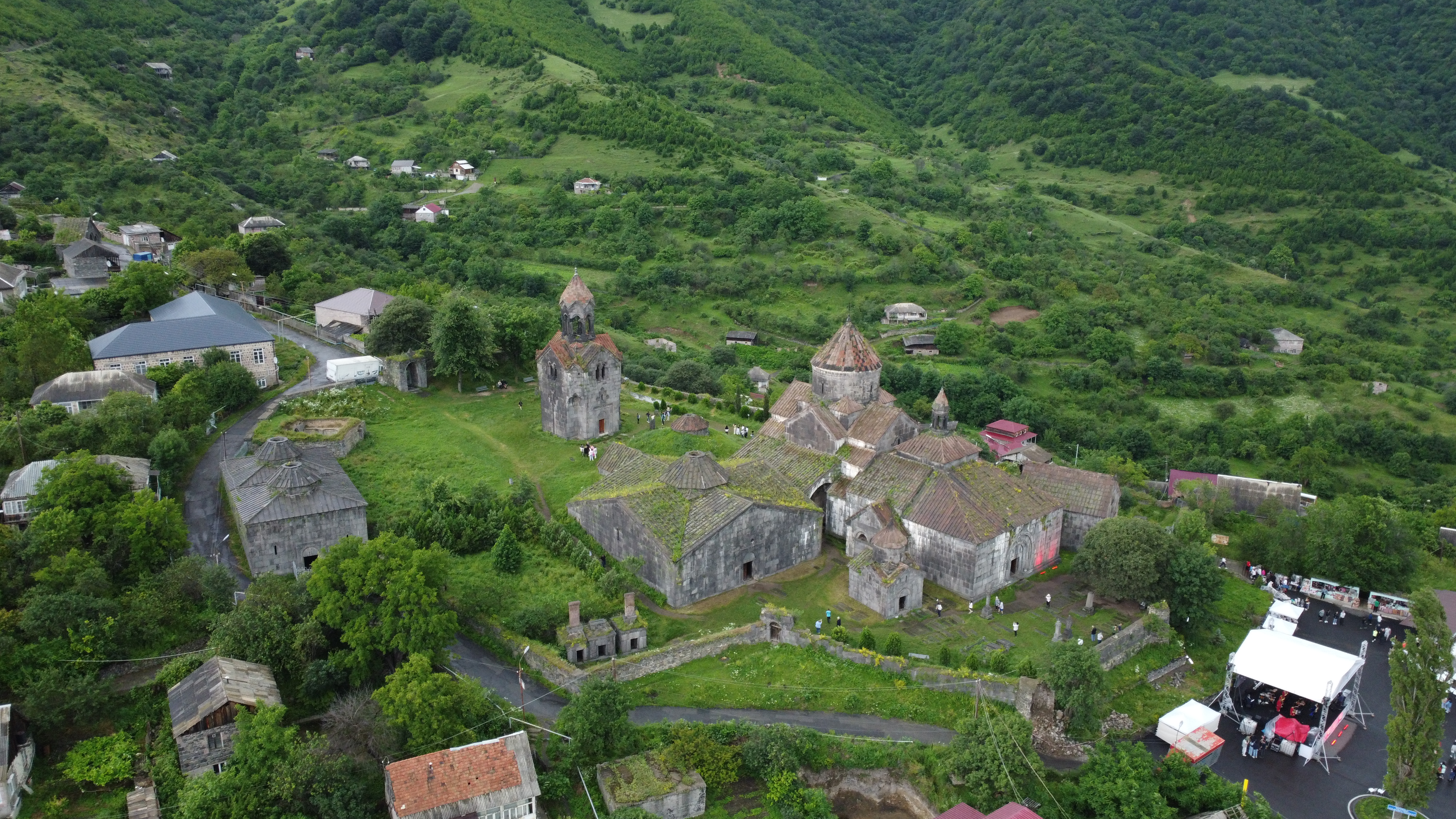
An aerial view

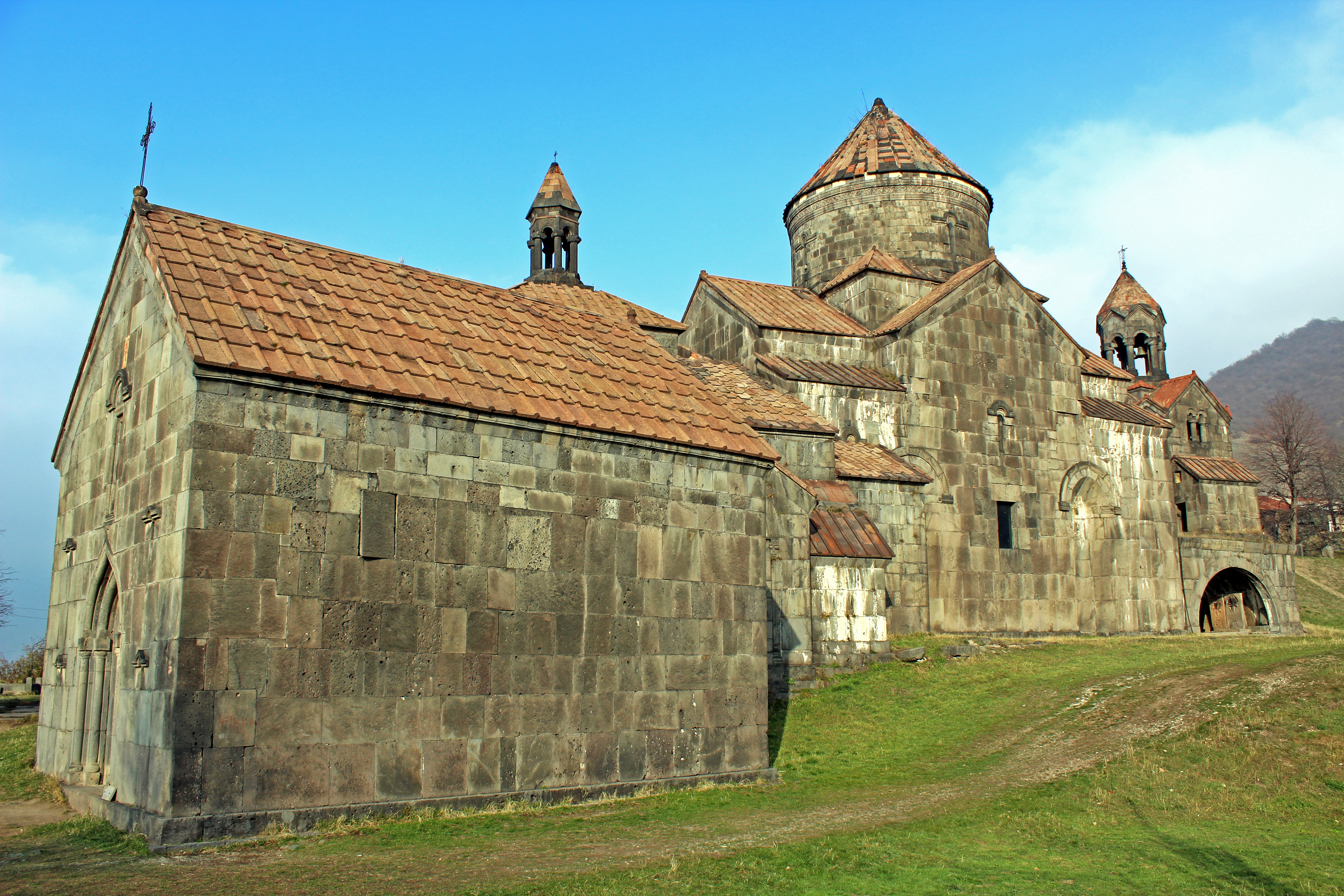

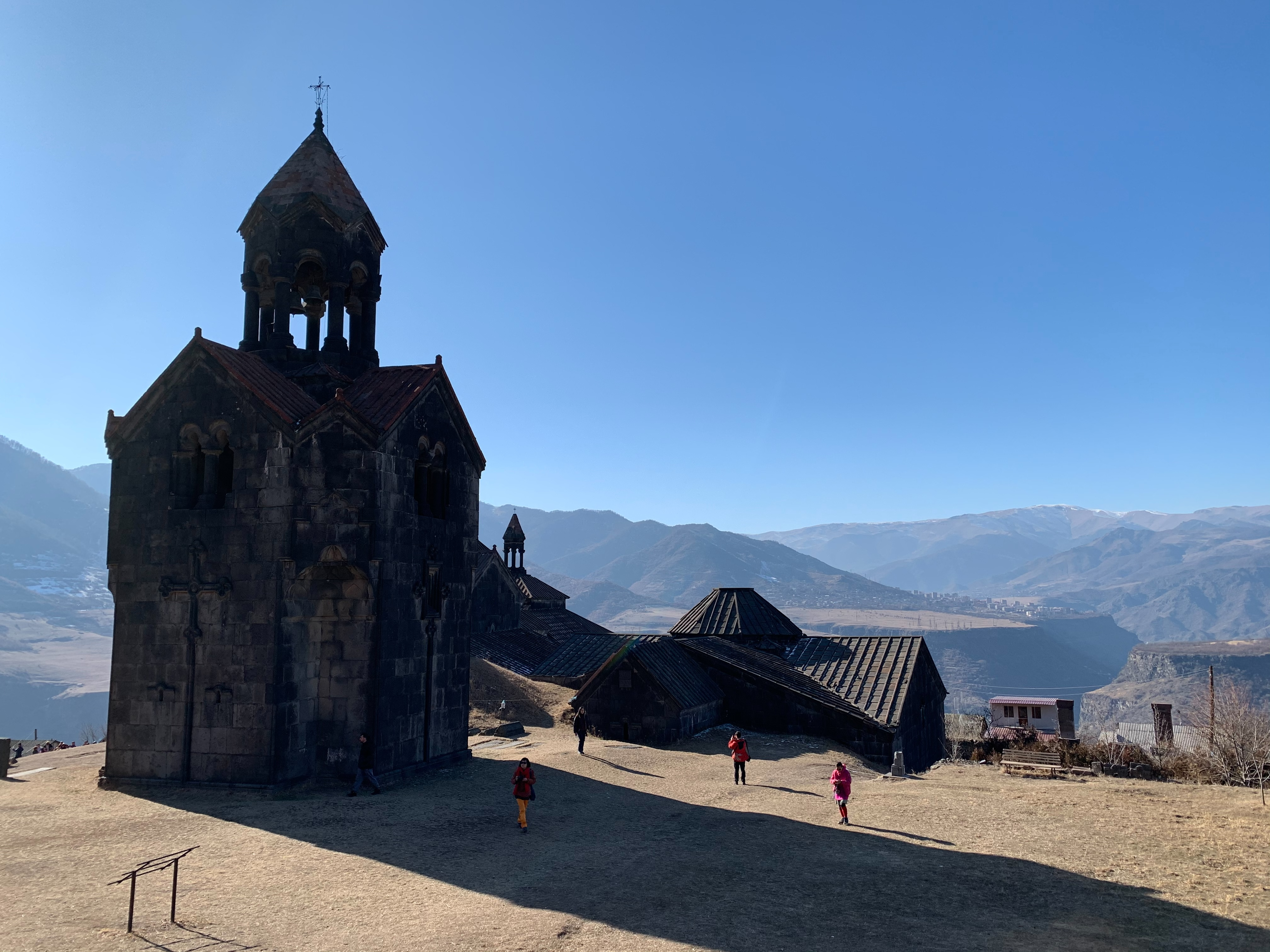
The bell tower

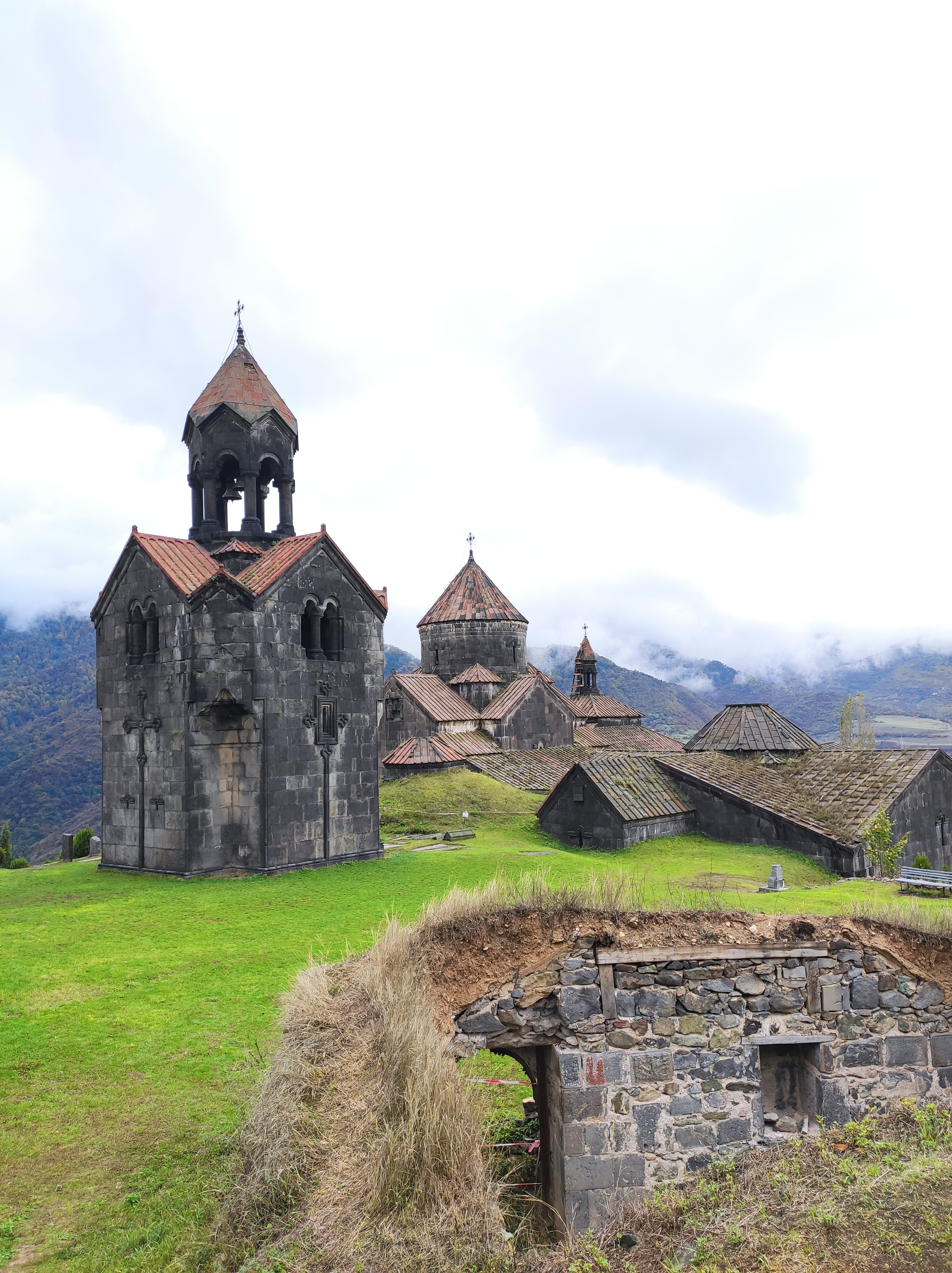

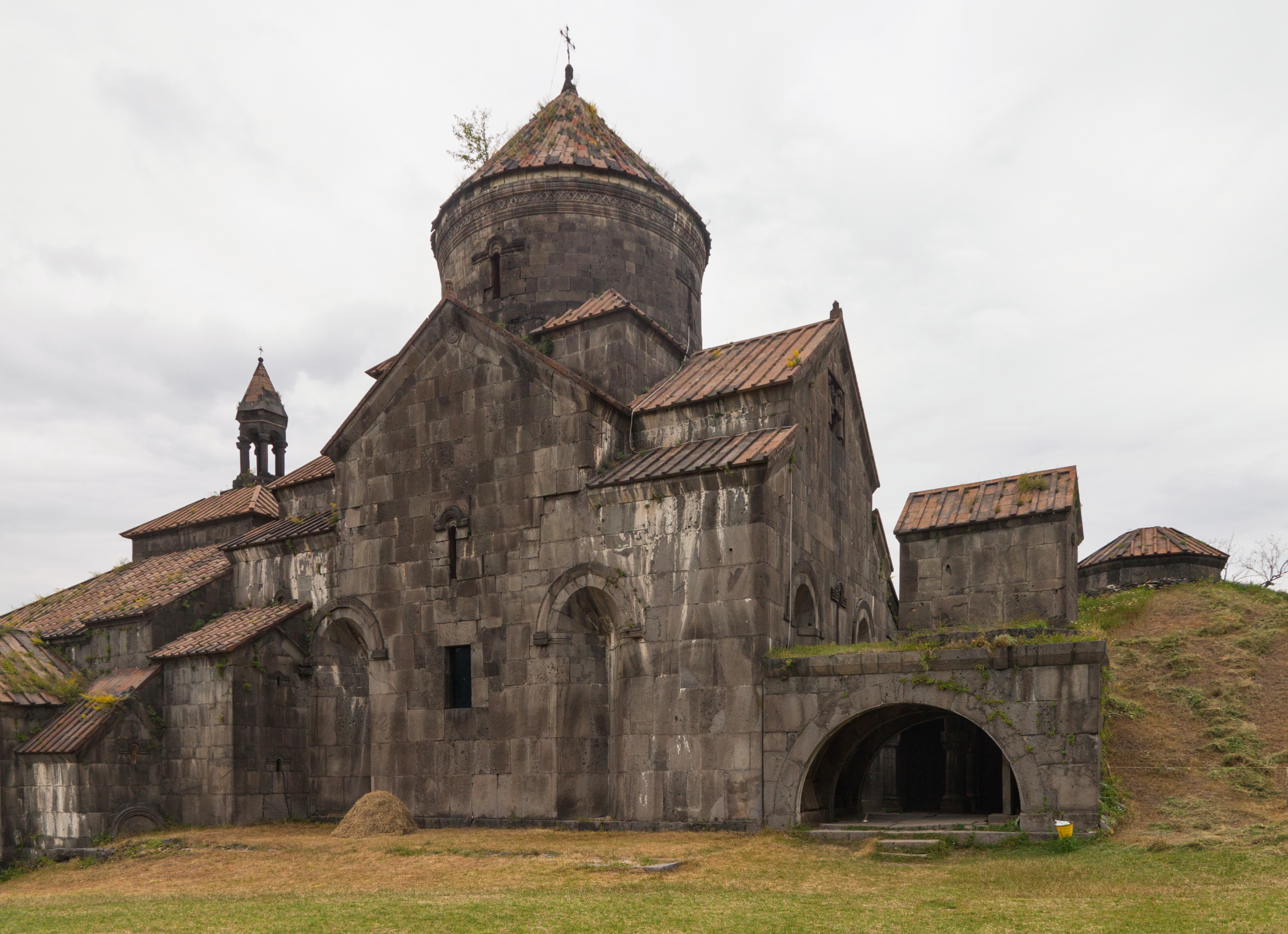

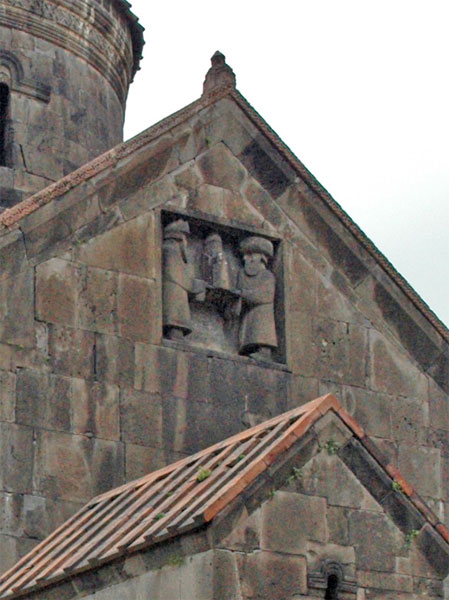

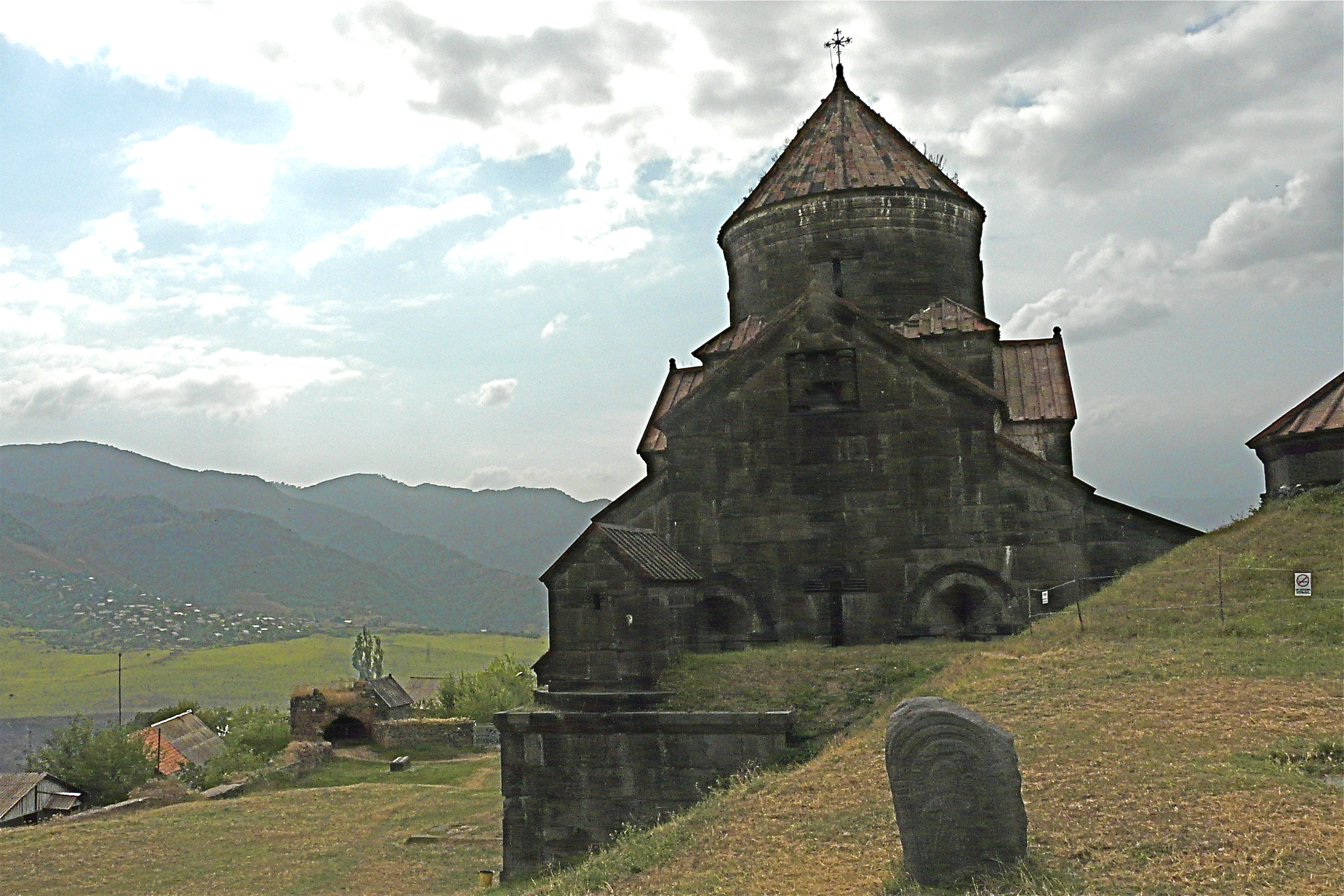

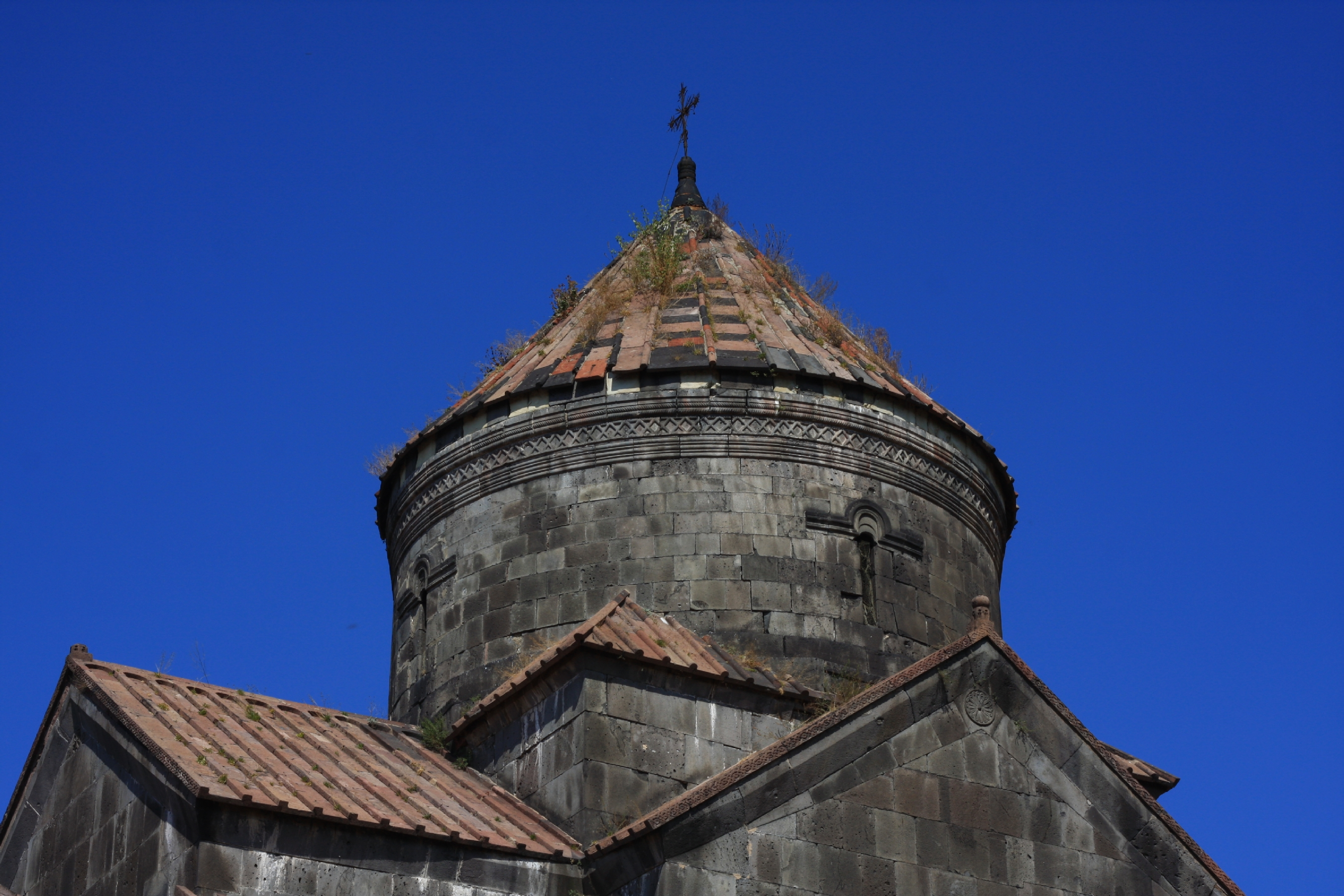

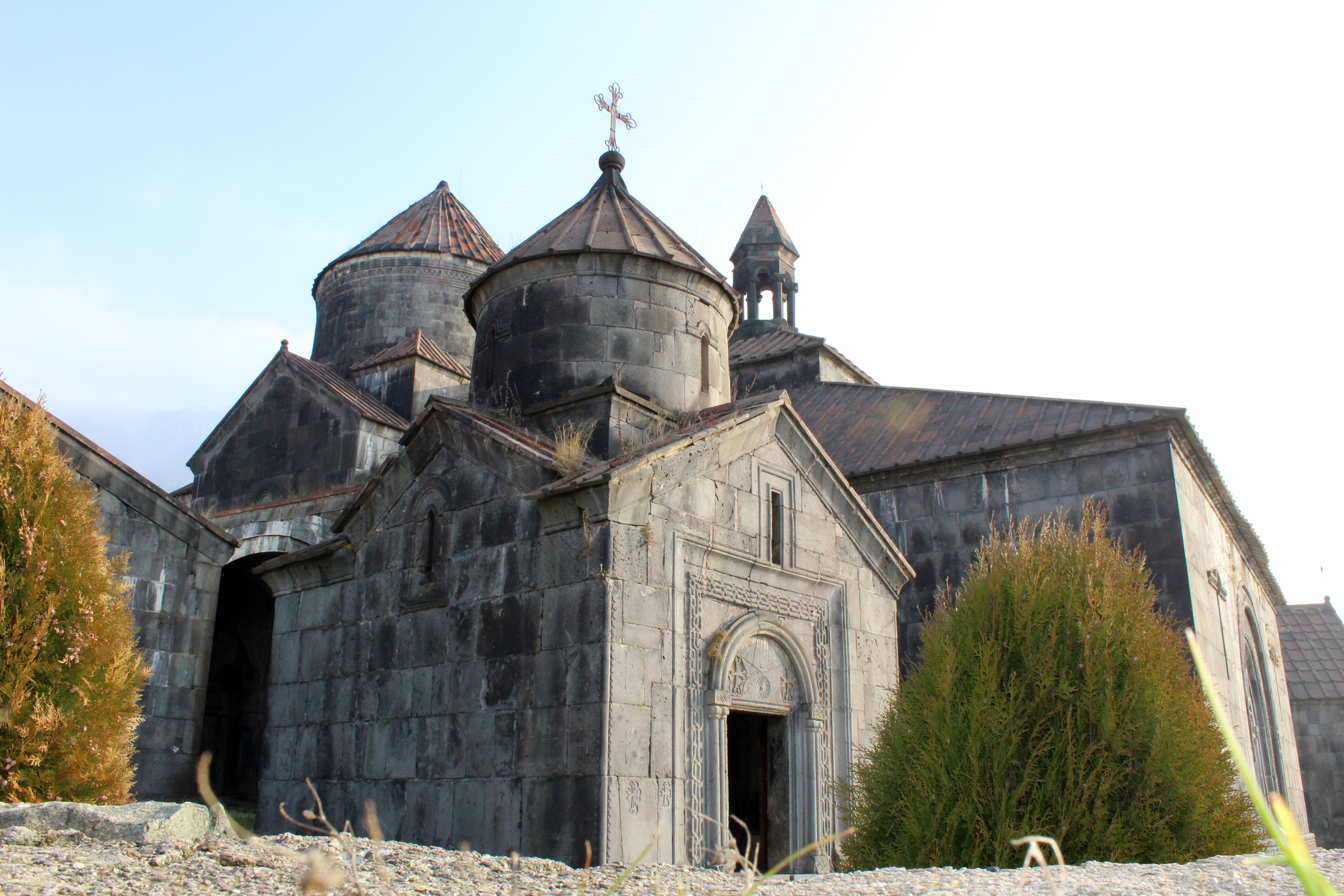
Mother of God Church

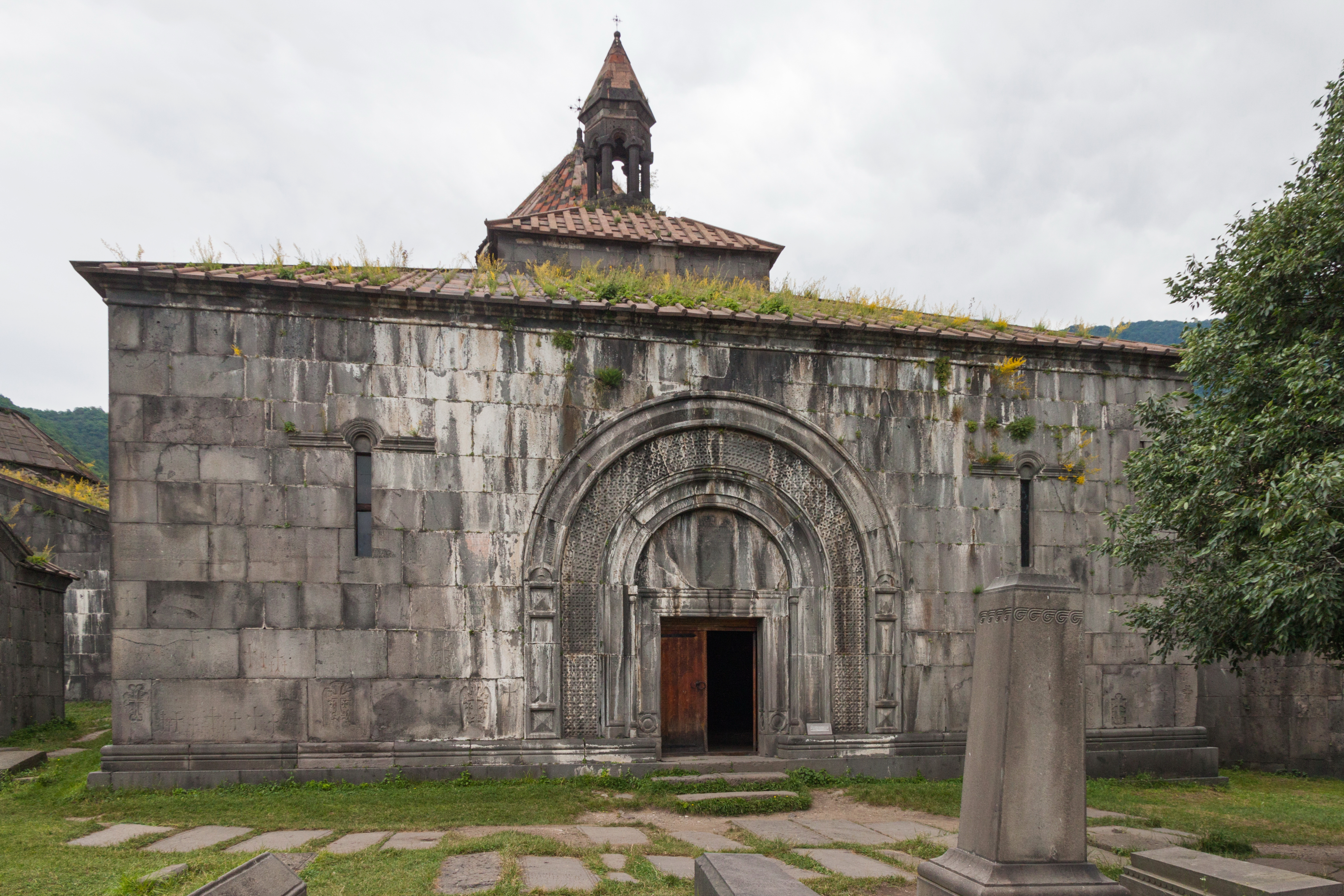
The gavit of Holy Cross Church

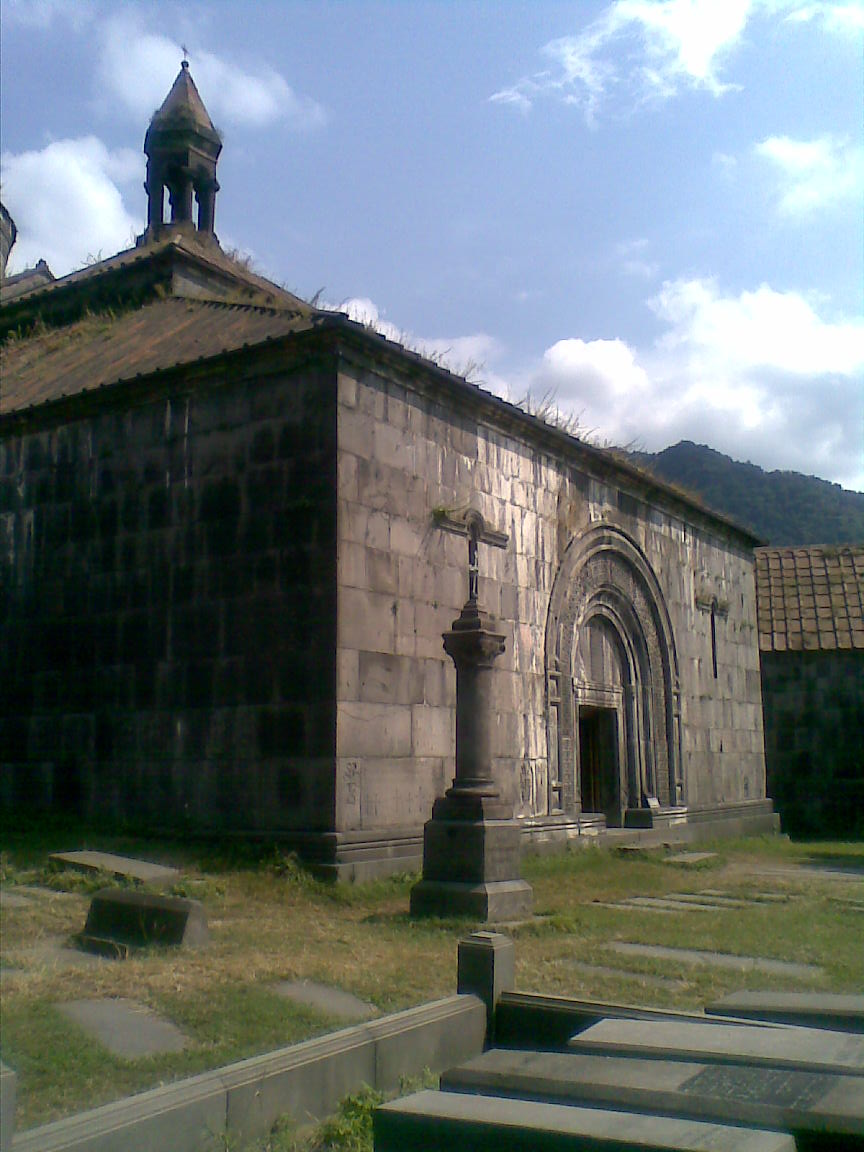
The gavit of Holy Cross Church

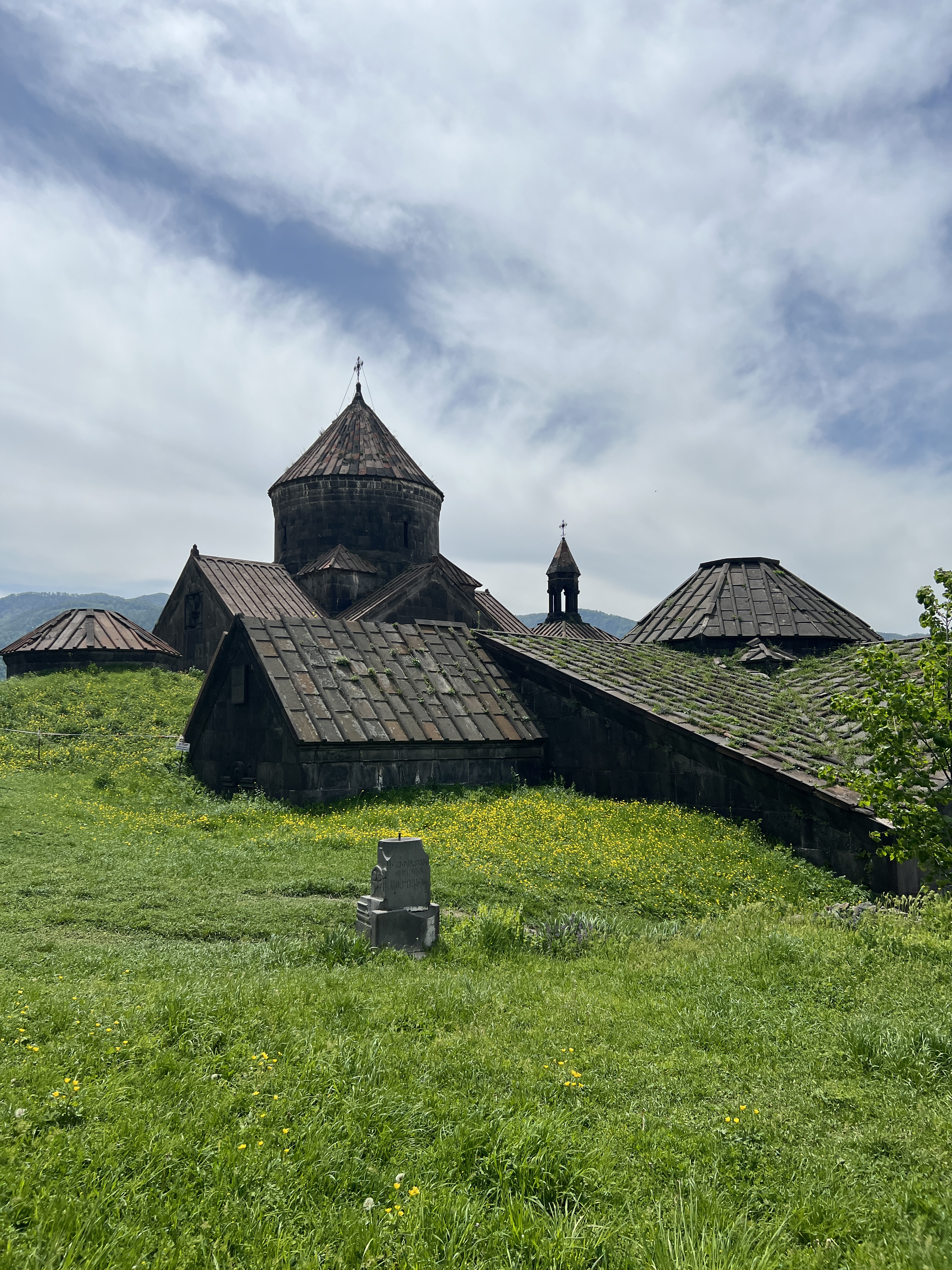

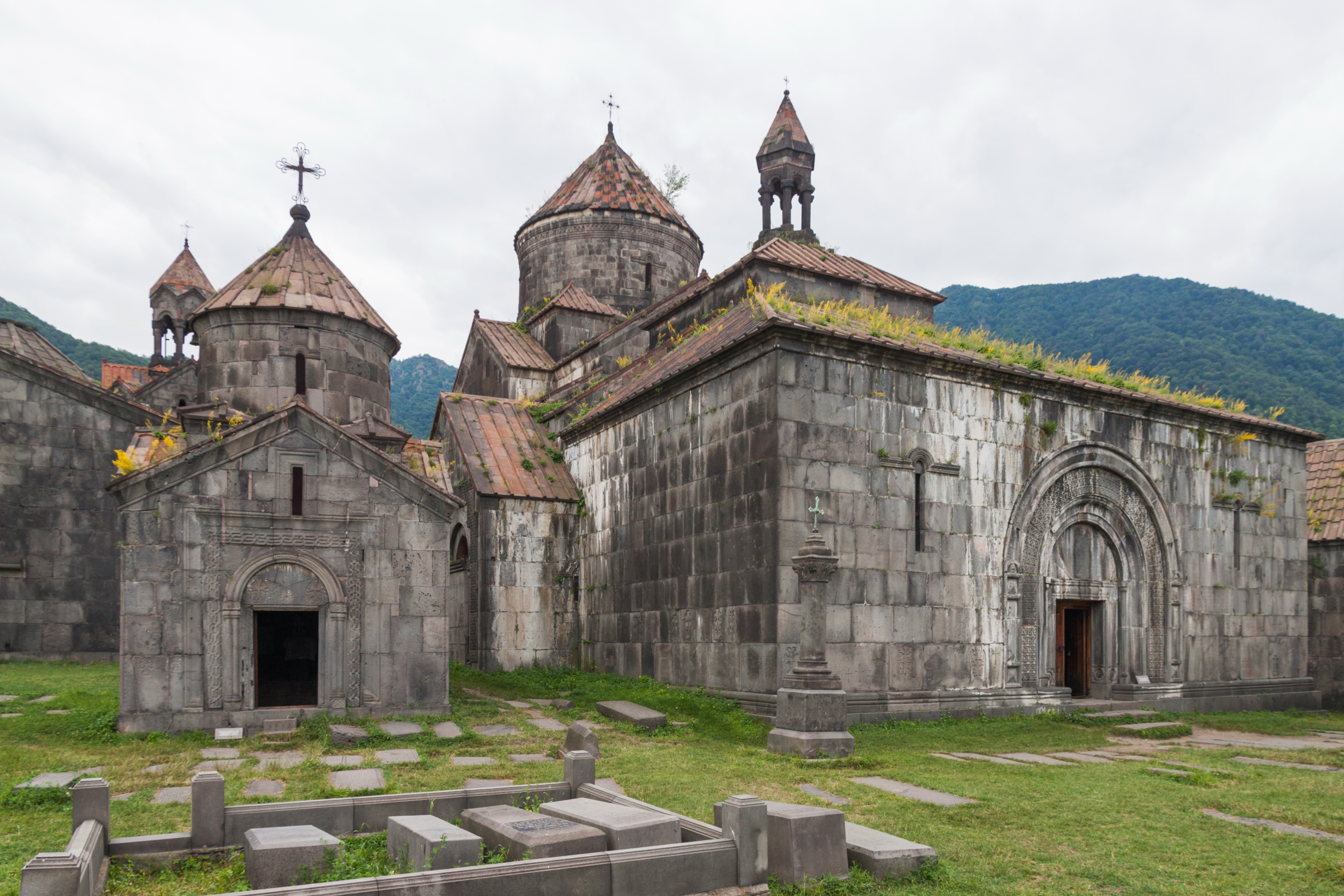

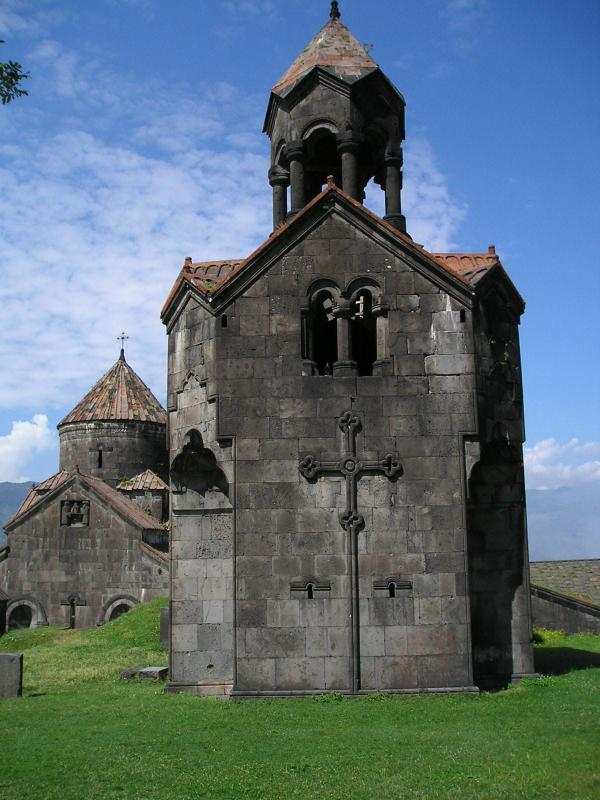
Belltower, 1245

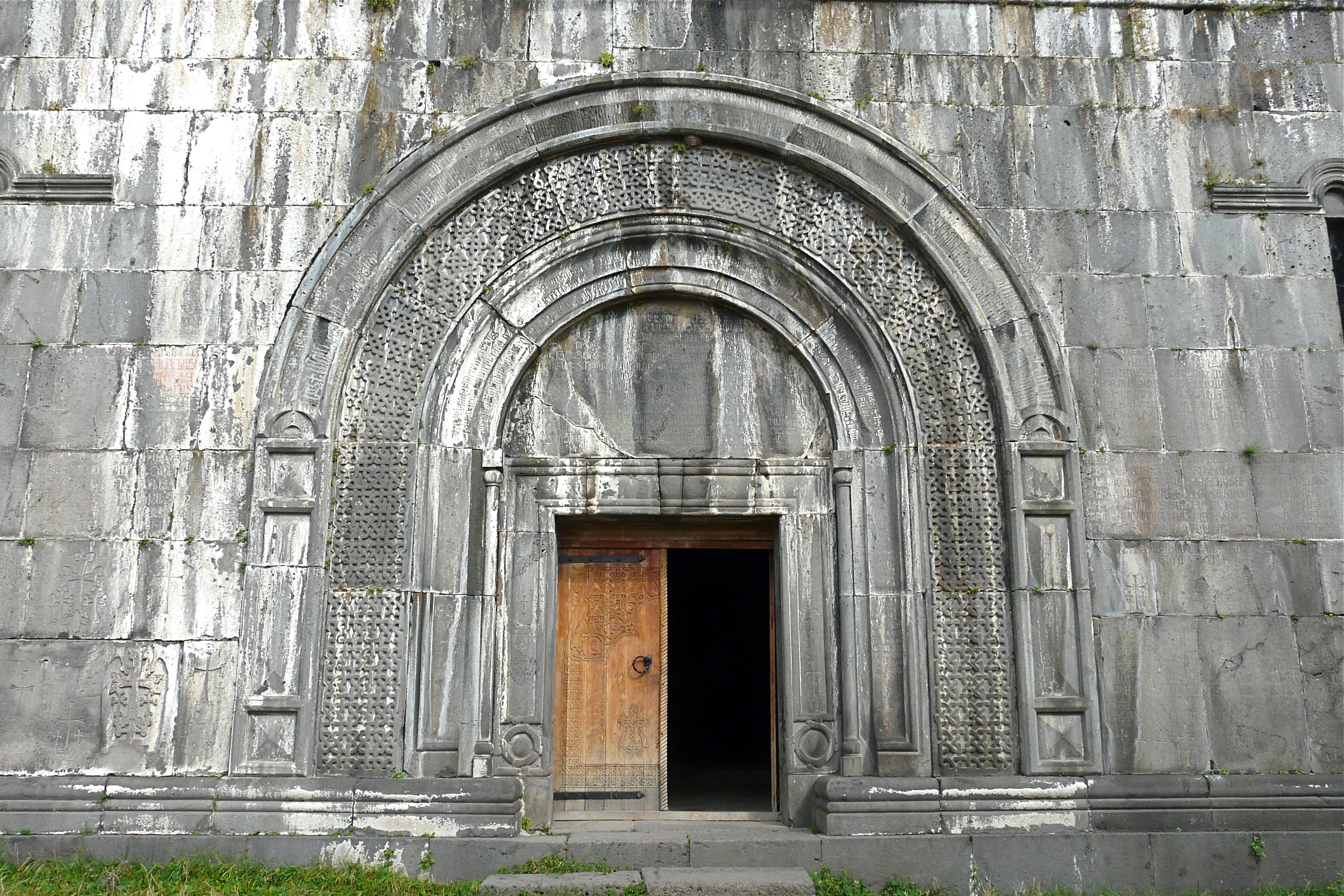
The gavit of Holy Cross Church

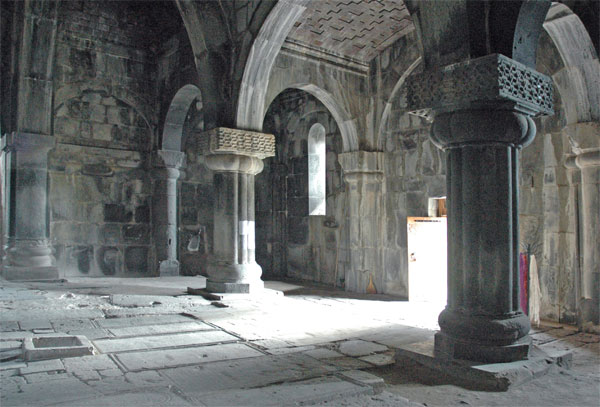
The gavit of Holy Cross Church

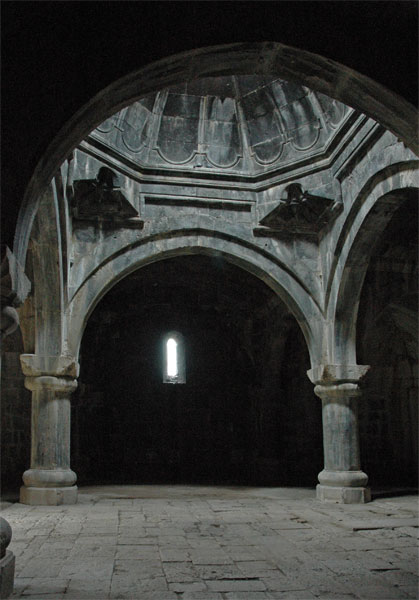
Hamazasp Gavit

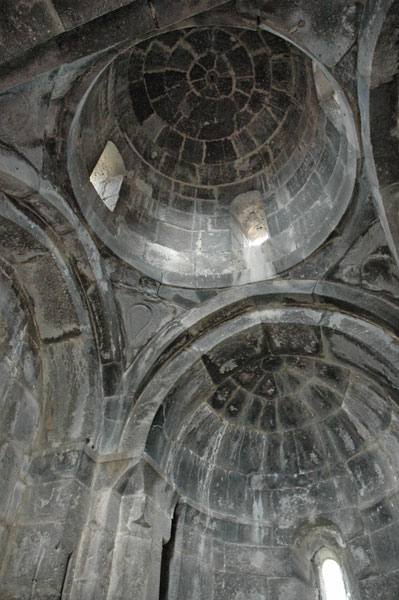

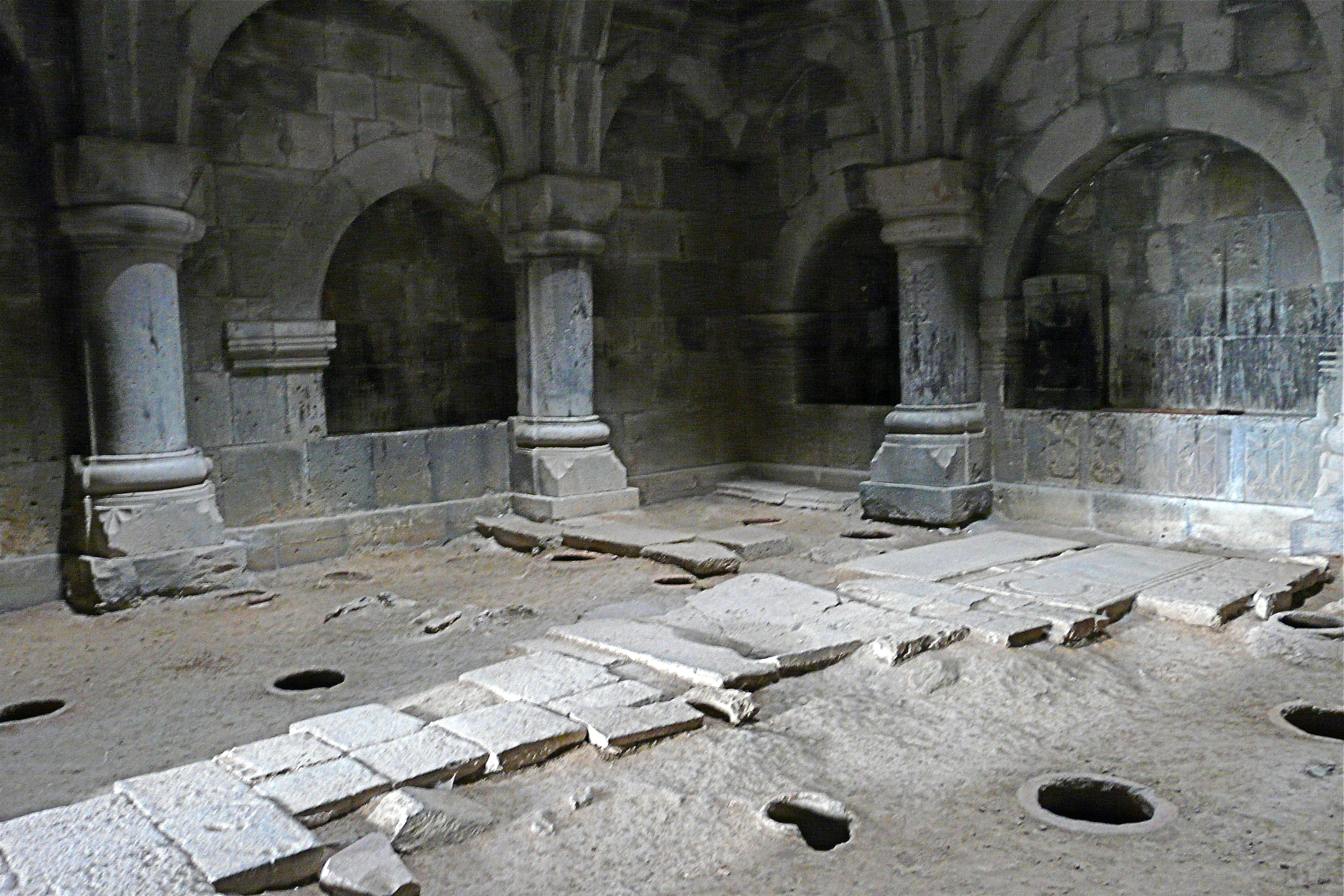

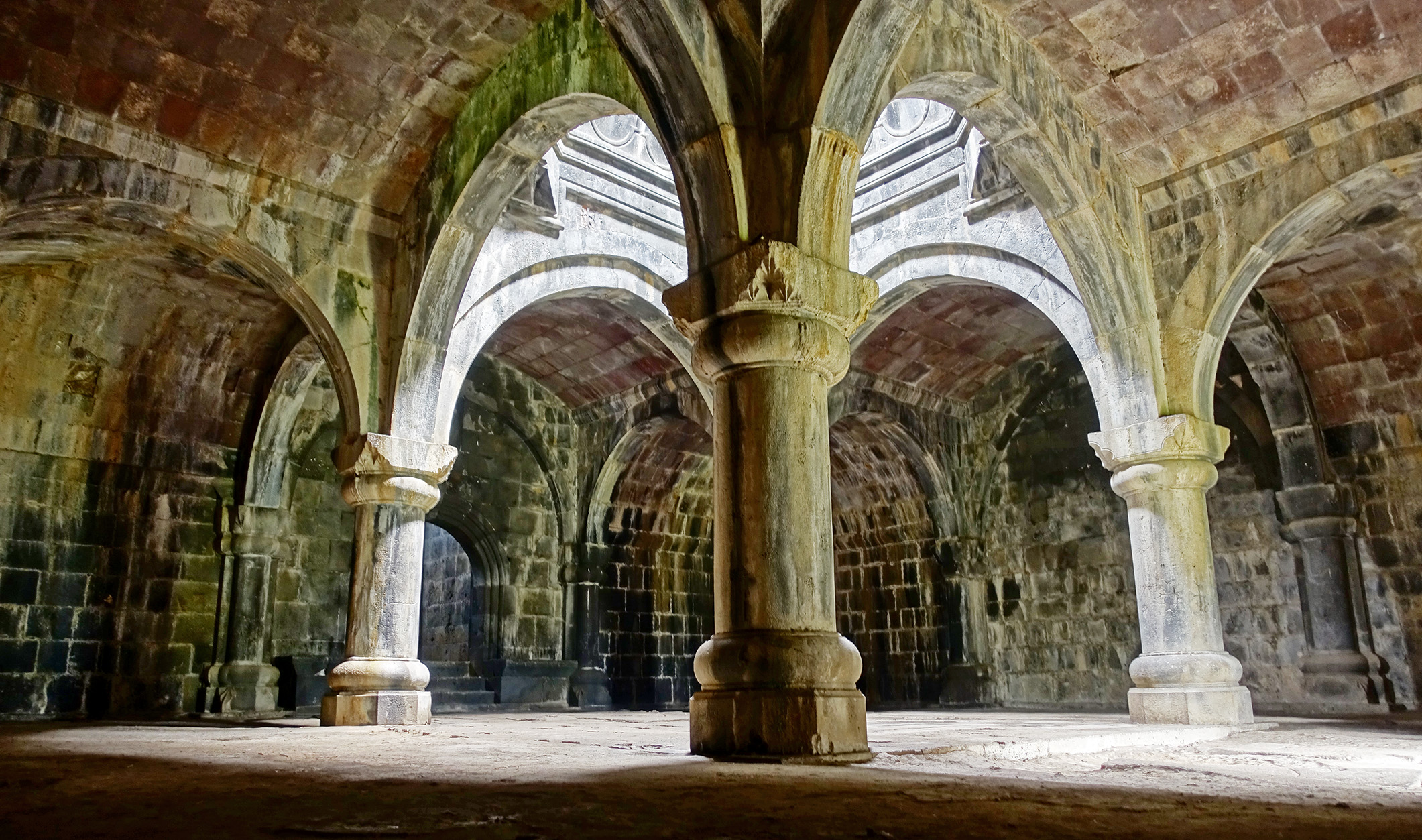
Hamazasp Gavit

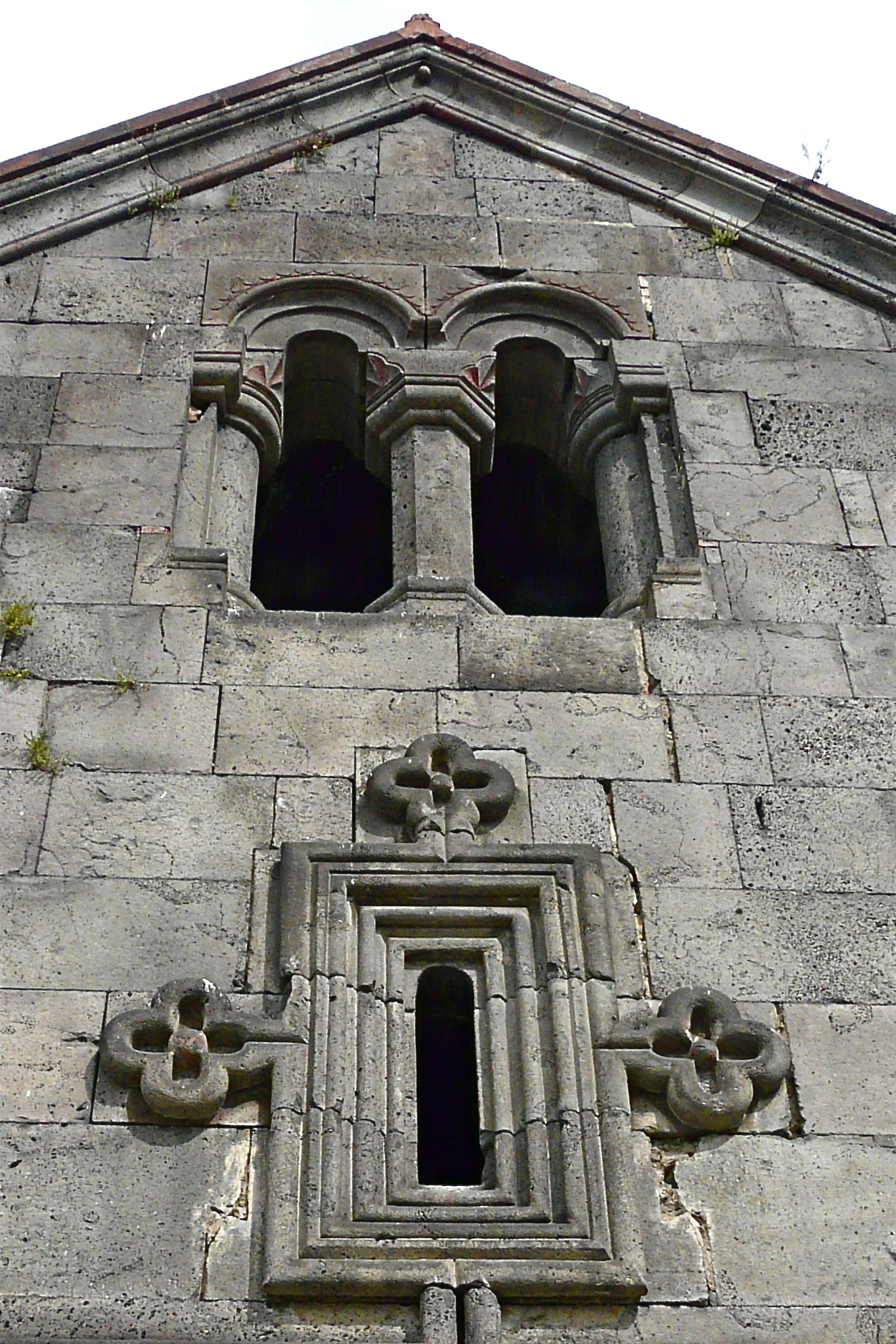

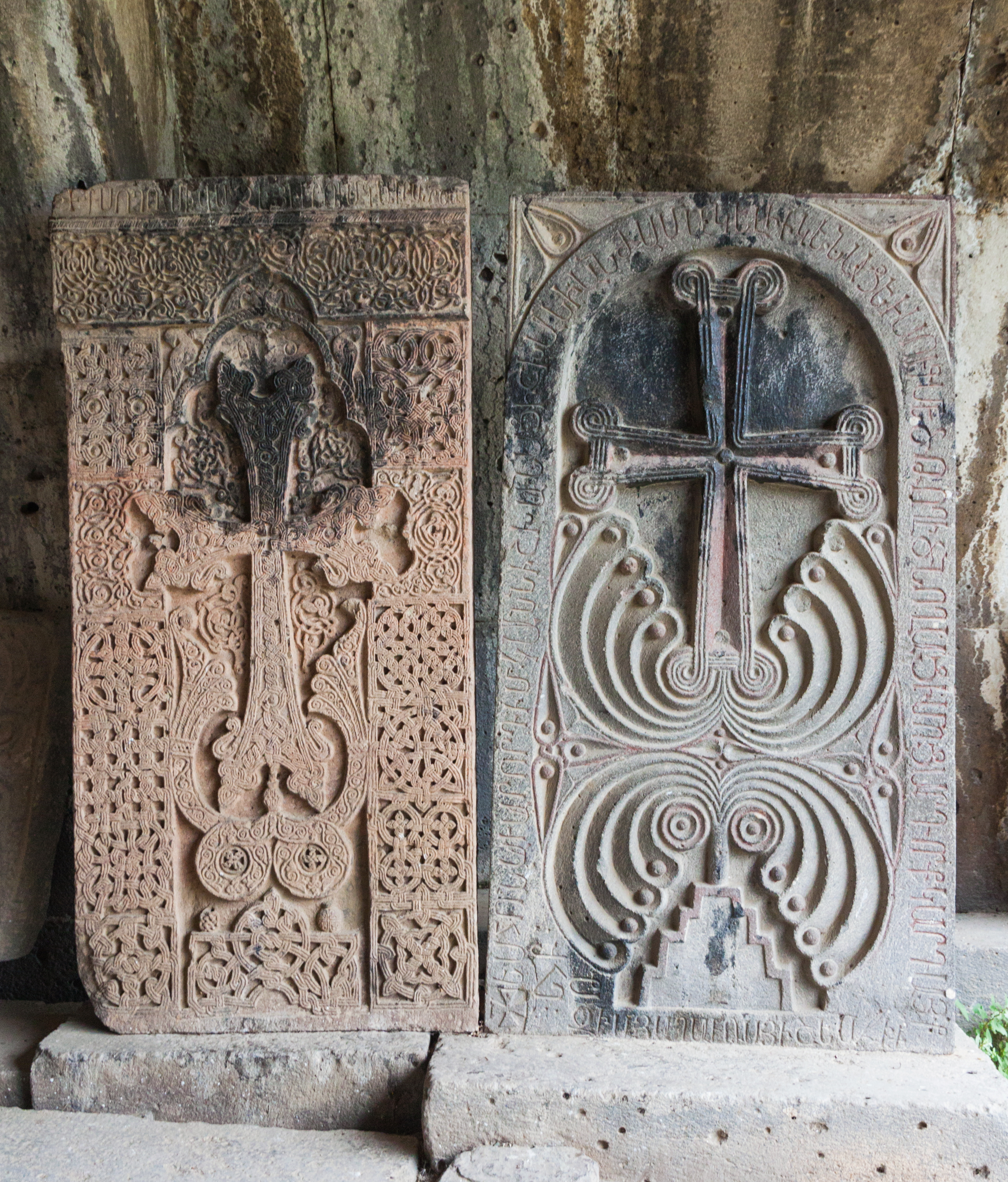
Khachkars

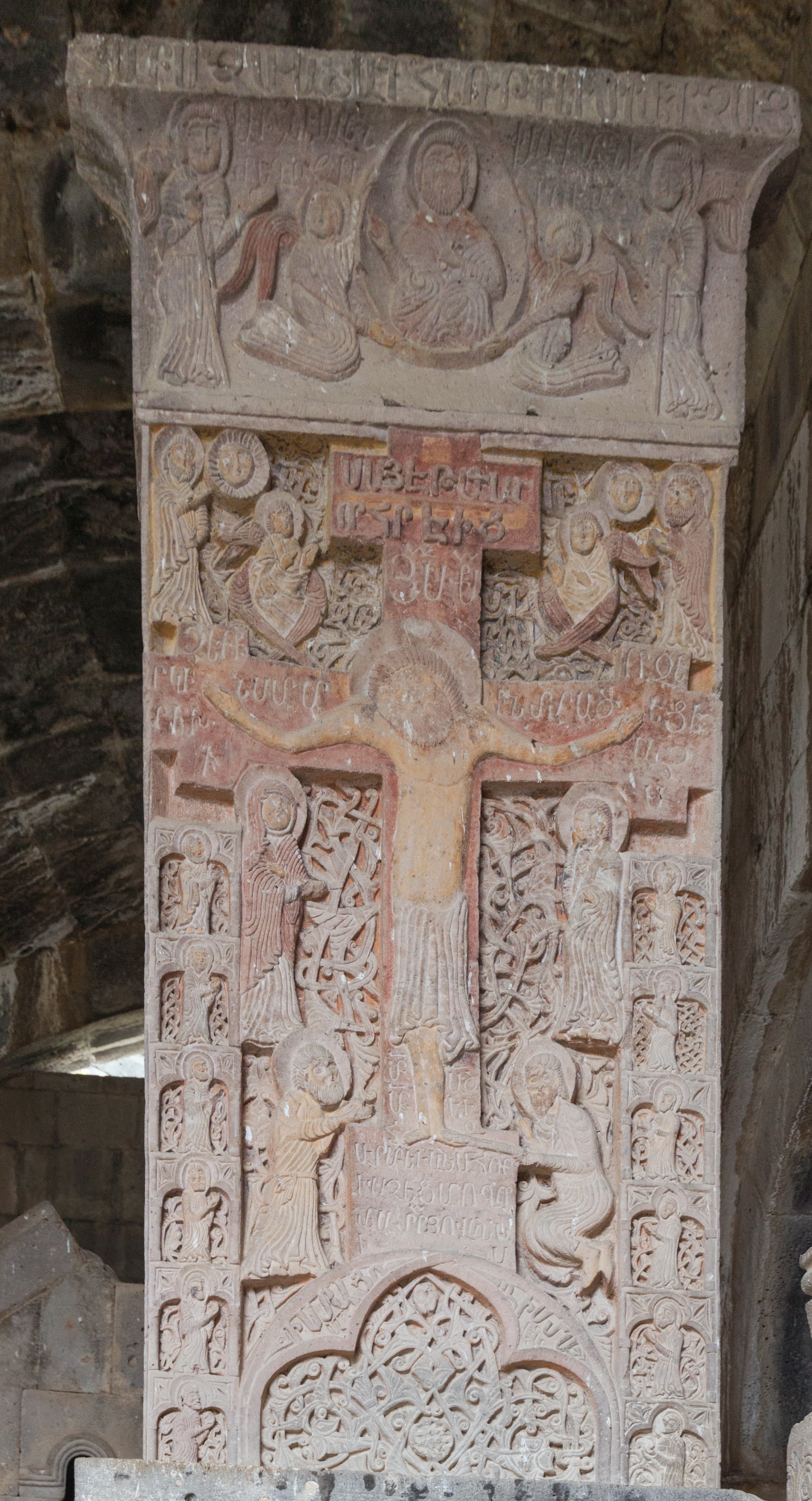
Holy Redeemer Khachkar (1273), in the gallery of the library

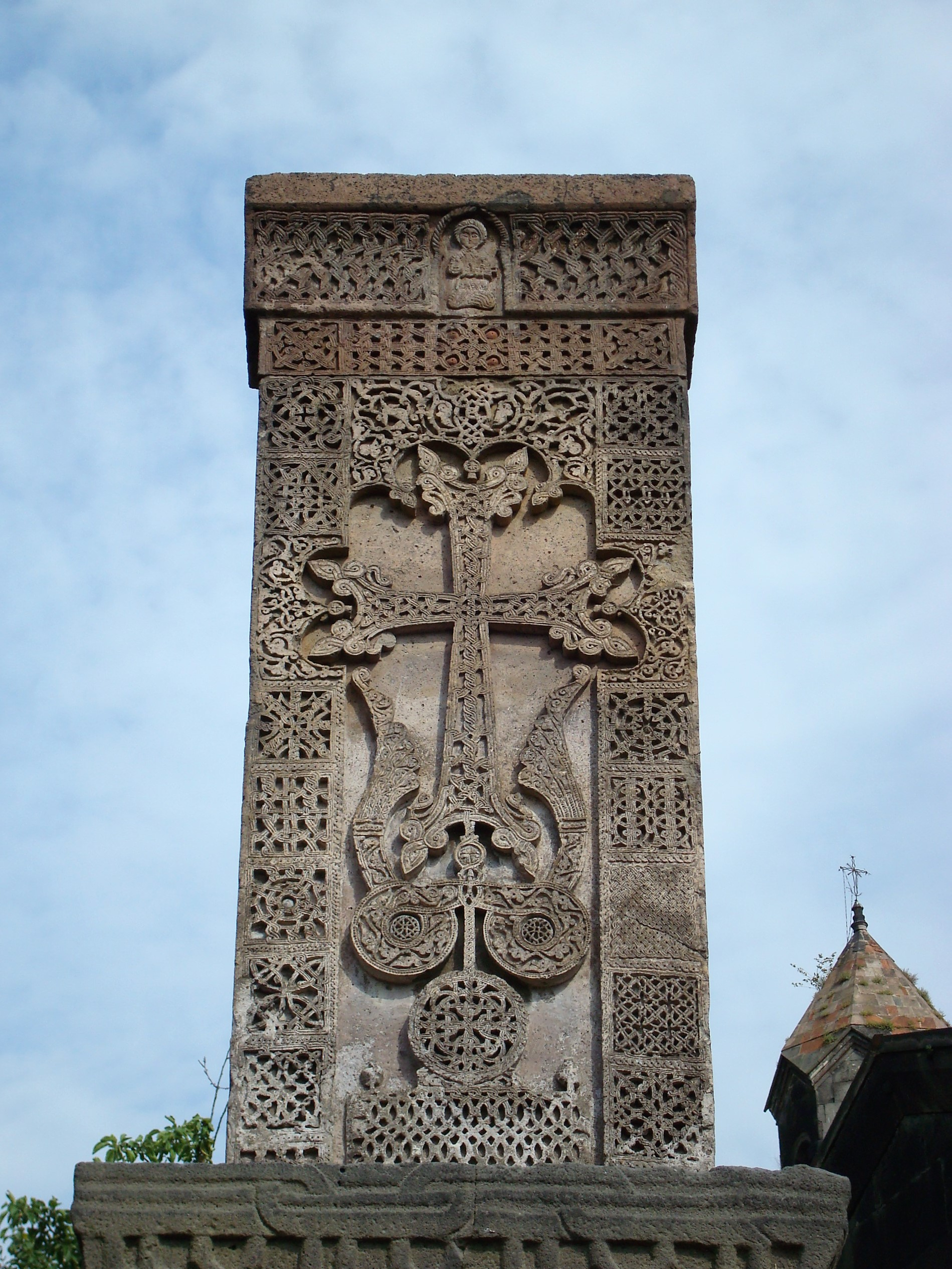
