= Amirtamira =

Political position in feudal Georgia

Amirtamira (Georgian: ამირთამირა) was a mayor or head of the large cities in feudal Georgia, that enjoyed military and administrative authority. The position was introduced after the initial Arab conquest of Georgia in the mid-7th century, when Abbasid caliphs appointed emirs of Tbilisi. The ascendancy of emirs ended in 1122 when King David IV of Georgia seized the city following his decisive victory at Didgori. Thereafter, the emirs became subordinated to the Mechurchletukhutsesi (Finance Minister) of Georgian crown. In the 17th century, the term was replaced by Mouravi. The last amirtamira of Tbilisi was Giorgi Saakadze.

One of the few attempts of third estate to gain power in feudal Georgia can be traced to Qutlu-Arslan, as a Finance Minister, he led a party who proposed an idea of limiting the royal power by a parliamentary-type legislature which, in the view of Qutlu Arslan and his followers, would be consist of two chambers: Darbazi (Royal Council) or an assembly that would meet occasionally to follow the developments in the kingdom, and Karavi, a legislature in permanent sessions. The dispute between the “party of Karavi” and that of the unlimited royal power concluded with the arrest of Qutlu Arslan. In retaliation, the latter’s supporters rose in rebellion, and marched to the Queen’s palace. Tamar agreed to release the oppositionist leader, but his ideas were never materialised. However some other historians believe that in addition to members of the higher secular and ecclesiastical nobility, the "Darbazi" now included representatives of the merchant-class, such as Abulasan.

== See also ==
- Amirspasalar
- Mandaturtukhutsesi

== Sources ==
- D. Muskhelishvili, Georgian Soviet Encyclopedia, I, p. 398, Tbilisi, 1975
