= Abulasan =

Abulasan (Georgian: აბულასანი) was a 12th-century Georgian politician, who served as mayor of Tbilisi and Eristavi of Kartli (1185–1188).

== Biography ==
During a revolt of treasurer Qutlu Arslan, Abulasan joined a group of unranked class and wealthy citizens in a struggle to limit the royal authority in 1191, which concluded with the arrest of Qutlu Arslan; his supporters were inveigled into submission. In case to avoid next waves of rebellion, Queen Tamar elevated Abulasan to the office of amirtamira of Tbilisi, thus making him assistant of mechurchletukhutsesi (treasurer). some other historians believe that he was also invited in the "Darbazi" (Royal Council) as a representative of the merchant-class.

The queen Tamar's marriage was a question of state-importance. Every group strove to select and secure the acceptance of its candidate in order to strengthen its position and influence at court. Two main factions fought for the influence in Tamar's court: clan of Mkhargrdzeli and Abulasan. The faction of the Abulasan won, the choice was approved by Tamar's aunt Rusudan and council of feudal lords. Their choice fell on Yuri, son of the murdered prince Andrey Bogolyubsky of Vladimir-Suzdal, who then lived as a refugee among the Kipchaks of the North Caucasus. Abulasan called an influential person in the kingdom, the great merchant Zankan Zorababeli. and ordered him to bring the bridegroom to Tbilisi, the latter fulfilled his mission with zeal, the prince was brought to Georgia to marry the queen in 1185. Favoured by Yuri, Abulasan obtained promotion and became the "mechurchletukhutsesi" (1187–1188) of the state, he was also appointed as Eristavi of Kartli (which was deprived of from Rati I Surameli). After the banishment of Yuri from the Georgian court, Abulasan was deprived all the office and his possessions were confiscated.
