= Burdukhan of Alania =

Queen of Georgia from 1156 to 1184

Burdukhan
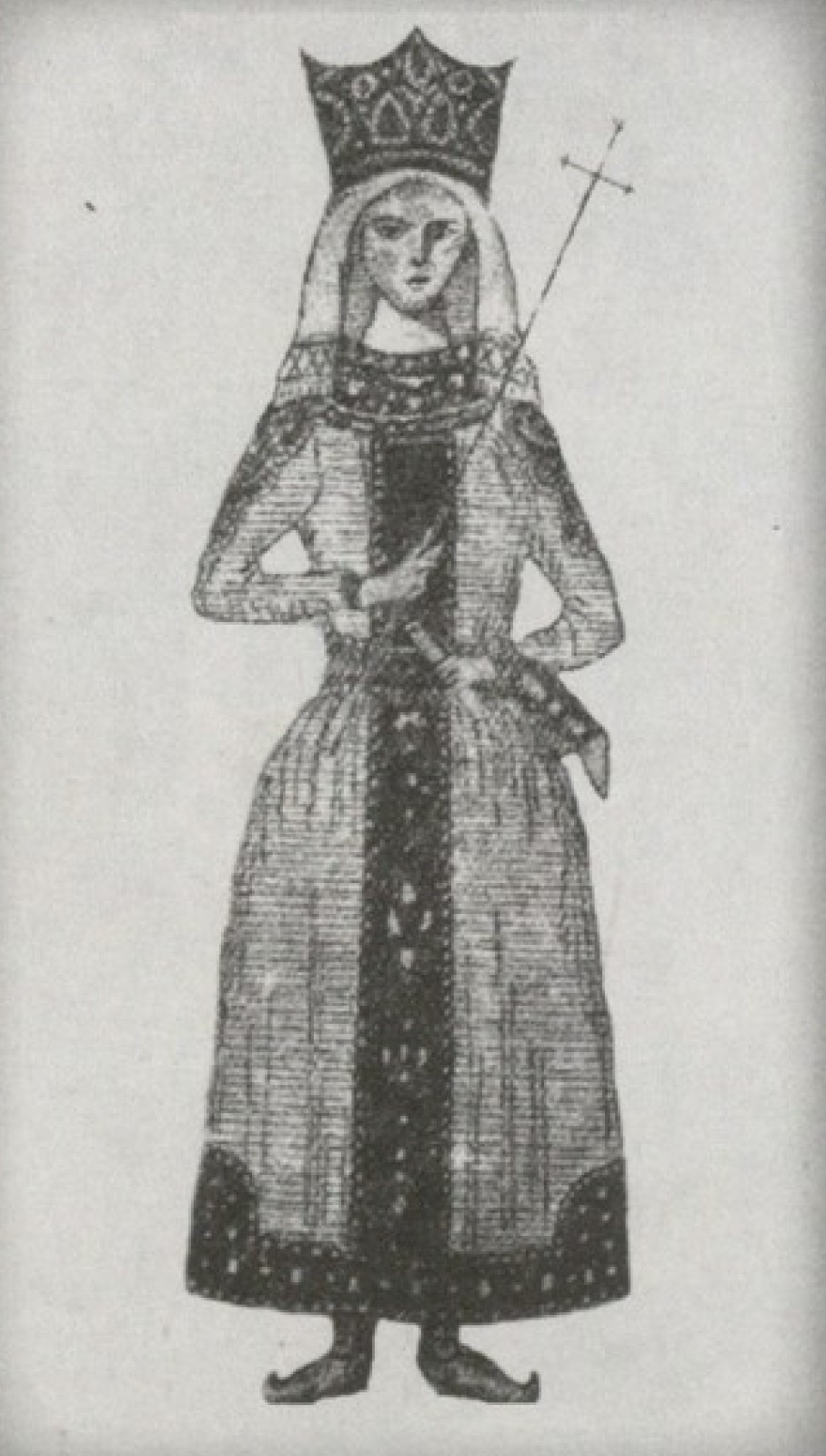

Queen consort of Georgia
- Tenure: 1156–1180s
- Spouse: George III of Georgia
- Issue: Tamar of Georgia; Rusudan
- Father: Khuddan of Alania

Burdukhan (Georgian: ბურდუხანი; died before 1184), also known as Bordokhan (ბორდოხანი), was an Alan princess and Queen consort of Georgia as the wife of George III of Georgia (r. 1156–1184). She was mother of Queen Tamar, who would preside over the apogee of the medieval Georgian monarchy.

== Biography ==
Burdukhan was a daughter of Khuddan, whom the Georgian chronicles call "king of the Osi", a Georgian designation of the Alan tribe in the North Caucasus. She married George, then a crown-prince of Georgia, in the lifetime of his father, King Demetrius I, in the 1150s. She gave birth to Tamar, subsequently queen regnant of Georgia. It is possible that the couple had another daughter Rusudan; but she is only mentioned once in all contemporary accounts of Tamar's reign. The medieval historians extol Burdukhan's piety and fidelity. One of them, an anonymous author of the Histories and Eulogies of Sovereigns, compares her to the Christian saints Catherine and Irene-Penelope.

Burdukhan died before her husband, that is, prior to 1184. Beyond the medieval chronicles, her name survives on the Icon of the Theotokos of Khobi, now on display at the Dadiani Palace Museum in Zugdidi, and in a wall inscription from Ruisi, where she is mentioned as a benefactor to the local cathedral.

== Notes ==
Royal titles
Preceded by Anonymous wife of Demetrius I	Queen consort of Georgia c. 1150/55–1180/84	Succeeded by Yury Bogolyubsky
