= Rebellion in Pkhovi and Didoya =

Rebellion in Modern day Dagestan against Georgia

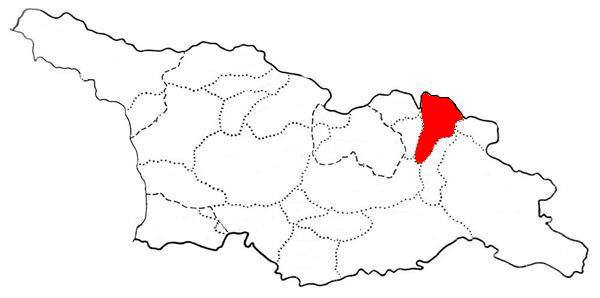
- Map of Pkhovi
Date	c. 1212
Location	Pkhovi, Didoya (Dagestan)
Result	Georgian-Durdzuks victory: Rebellion suppressed

Belligerents
Pkhovi; Didoya	Kingdom of Georgia; Durdzuk confederation

Commanders and leaders
Unknown	Ivane I Zakarian

The Rebellion in Pkhovi and Didoya (Georgian: ფხოველთა და დიდოელთა აჯანყება, romanized: pkhovelta da didoelta ajanq'eba) was a 1212 uprising of the mountainous communities in the Kingdom of Georgia, against the attempts of transplanting feudal practices and forceful Christianization of the locals. In the last years of Queen Tamar's reign, an uprising began in the mountain areas of Pkhovi, Mtiuleti, and Didoeti.

== History ==
Although mountainous communities were nominally under the direct rule of the Georgian crown, they had never been completely integrated into the feudal system of medieval Georgia, and remained relatively little affected by implantation of aristocratic landowners. Local patriarchal communities were rather electing their own council of elders and leaders, known as Khevisberi who functioned as a judge, priest and military leader.

During the reign of Queen Tamar, who presided over the Golden Age of the Kingdom of Georgia. Georgian feudal lords gradually increased their rights. This was a classical period in the history of Georgian feudalism. Georgia's northeastern frontier became the object of the Kakhetian Eristavis avarice. Attempts at transplanting feudal practices in the areas where they had previously been almost unknown did not pass without resistance. Thus, there was a revolt among the mountaineers of Pkhovi and Didoya in 1212. The refractory independence of Mountainous clans led to the sporadic incursions of royal troops aided by Durdzuks tribes bent on forcing them into submission. One of the most devastating expeditions against the Mountaineers was organized in c. 1212, at the behest of Queen Tamar herself. The contemporary chronicle recounts a bloody three-month campaign of pacification by Tamar's general Ivane Mkhargrdzeli, that left several villages and shrines destroyed.

== Sources ==
- Metreveli, R. (1986). "ფხოველთა და დიდოელთა აჯანყება" [Rebellion in Pkhovi and Didoya]. In Abashidze, I. (ed.). Georgian Soviet Encyclopedia (in Georgian). Tbilisi. p. 439.
