= Basil the Treasurer =

Basil Ezosmodzgvari (Georgian: ბასილი ეზოსმოძღვარი) was a Lord and ezosmodzgvari (steward) of the Royal Court in feudal Georgia, who lived in the late 12th and early 13th centuries. According to I. Javakhishvili he is Queen Tamar's historian and author of "The Life of Monarch of Monarchs Tamar".

== Sources ==
- The Great Soviet Encyclopedia, 3rd edition (1970-1979)
