= Anton Kutateli =

Anton Sagirisdze or Anton Kutateli (Georgian: ანტონ ქუთათელი) was a 12th-century Georgian archbishop of Kutaisi.

After the death of George III, the archbishop of Kutaisi, the worthy and blessed monk Anton Sagirisdze was invited, and asked him to take the crown in his hands, because according to church rankings, Imereti, was charged with the task of crowning the sovereign at the coronation ceremony. Encouraged by the confidence of the Queen Tamar and her supporters, Anton Kutateli, who directed the synod with the latter, wanted to prevent Michael IV from attending the synod, However the synod failed to prove that Michael was holding his office illegitimately and was unable to remove him. During the revolt of Queen Tamar's disgraced husband, George the Rus', around 1191, Anton Kutateli and other Church and secular dignitaries were sent to talk to the rebels to find out the reason for this rebellion. but their mission failed.
