= Zankan Zorababeli =

Zankan Zorababeli (Georgian: ზანქან ზორაბაბელი) was a 12th-century, Georgian Jewish merchant from Tbilisi.

The Queen Tamar's marriage was a question of state importance. Every group strove to select and secure the acceptance of its candidate in order to strengthen its position and influence at court. Two factions fought for the influence in Tamar's court: clan of Mkhargrdzelis and Abulasan, amirtamira of Tbilisi. Then the Abulasan, came forward and said: "I know one prince, the son of the great Rus' prince Yury; he was a child when his father died, and, persuaded by his uncle Salavat, moved away to other country; He lives now in the city of Sevinj, king of the Kipchaks." Candidature was approved by the council of feudal lords. They called an influential person in the kingdom, the great merchant Zankan Zorababeli. He was given the mission of bringing the bridegroom to Tbilisi. He fulfilled his mission with zeal, changing his horses on the way, he quickly reached his destination, and brought back the young man - valiant, perfect of body and pleasant to behold - sooner than the fixed time.
