= Anton Gnolistavisdze =

12th-century Georgian politician and monk

Anton Gnolistavisdze (Georgian: ანტონ გნოლისთავისძე) was a 12th-century Georgian politician and monk.

During George III's reign Anton – "a wise and reasonable man faithful to his masters and an able manager" – served as Mtsignobartukhutses-Chkondideli (chancellor) and Grand vizier (c.1179-1184) at Georgian royal court, however after the king's death, Catholicos-Patriarch Michael IV took that office from him. Afterward Anton left secular life to become a monk at Gareja monastery. The turning point in Anton's fortunes came with the death of the powerful Catholicos-Patriarch Michael whom the Queen Tamar replaced, as a chancellor, with her supporter, Anton Gnolistavisdze. Tamar also granted him episcopate at Samtavisi. Anton Gnolistavisdze "a real knight by his appearance and origin" participated in Battle of Shamkor in 1195. He was ordered to bear in front the "Life-creating Cross", which is the scepter and armor of kings. Being a monk, Anton did not keep a sword, but with his two knights, he seized from the enemy three hundred mules and camels.
