= Queen Tamara (play) =

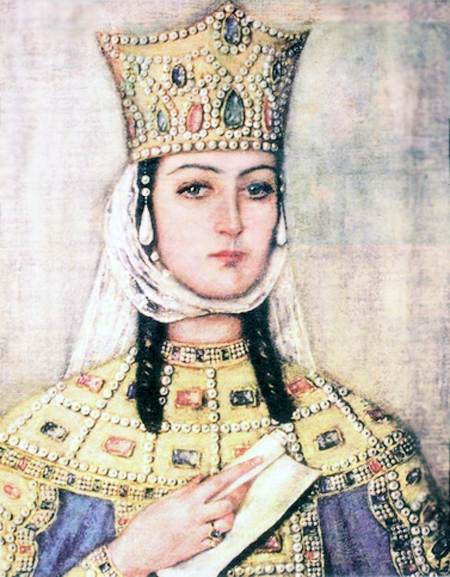
Queen Tamar of Georgia

Queen Tamara (Norwegian: Dronning Tamara) is a three-act play by Knut Hamsun about Tamar of Georgia. It was published in 1903.

== Characters ==
- Tamara, Queen of Georgia
- Prince Giorgi, her husband
- Giorgi and Rusdan, their children
- The prior
- The abbot
- Fatimat, the queen's servant
- The khan of Tovin
- Zaidata
- Juanata
- Sofiat
- Mecedu
- Prince Giorgi's adjutant
- Two Tatar officers
- Two Georgian prisoners
- A hetman
- The queen's officers and soldiers, Tovin officers and soldiers, monks, scribes, musicians, dancers, girls, servants

== Reception ==
Hamsun's play was poorly received. Reviews characterized it as uninteresting or even a failure, and Hamsun is considered to have known too little about the subject matter to convincingly develop the plot.
