= Rusudan (daughter of Demetrius I of Georgia) =

12th-century Georgian princess

Rusudan (Georgian: რუსუდანი) was a 12th-century Georgian princess of the Bagrationi royal family. She was a daughter of King Demetrius I of Georgia, sister of the kings David V and George III, and a paternal aunt of the famous Queen Tamar of Georgia. She was referred as dedopali in Georgian which translates to queen. In the Seljuk Empire, she was known as Abkhaziyya Khatun.

In 1143, Rusudan married Seljuk Sultan Ghiyath ad-Din Mas'ud, and was given Ganja as a dowry. However, the marriage only lasted a few years before his death in 1152. She then married his uncle Sultan Ahmad Sanjar. After Sanjar's death in 1157, she married his nephew Sultan Suleiman. The marriage lasted until his death in 1161, after which she returned to Georgia. She was childless and never remarried. Her brother George's daughters, Tamar and Rusudan, were educated at her court in Samshvilde.

After Rusudan's brother died in 1184, her niece Tamar ascended the throne. Rusudan was influential during her reign. In 1185, Yury Bogolyubsky joined a political conspiracy aimed at restraining the authority of Tamar. During this period, Rusudan, collaborated with the Catholicos (the leader of the Georgian Church) to orchestrate the marriage between Yury and Tamar. Despite Tamar being initially crowned as mepe (ruler) by her father, their union resulted in Yury also holding the title of mepe, altering Tamar's designation to 'king of kings and queen of queens.' She was also foster-mother to Alan prince David Soslan whom Tamar married as her second husband in 1189, after her divorce from her first husband in 1187.
