= David Soslan =

King consort of Georgia c.1189–1207

- King consort
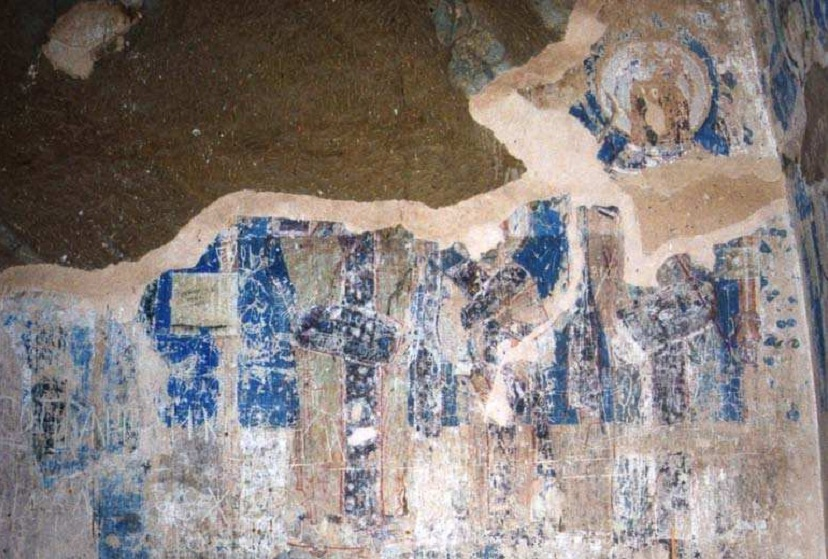
- Fresco of David Soslan, Tamar, and their son George

King consort of Georgia
- Tenure: c. 1187/1189 – c. 1207
- Died: 1207
- Spouse: Tamar of Georgia
- Issue: George IV of Georgia; Rusudan of Georgia
- House: Bagrationi dynasty
- Father: Jadaron
- Religion: Georgian Orthodox Church
- Khelrtva

David Soslan (Georgian: დავით სოსლანი, romanized: davit soslani [ˈd̪ävit̪ʰ ˈs̪o̞s̪län̪i]), (died 1207) was a prince from Alania and second husband of Queen Tamar of Georgia, whom he married in c. 1189. He is chiefly known for his military exploits during Georgia's wars against its Muslim neighbors.

== Name ==
David's second name "Soslan" is the first known instance of it being used as a personal name. The name is derived from the mythological figure Soslan, who is one of the leading figures of the Ossetian Nart epics.

== Origins ==
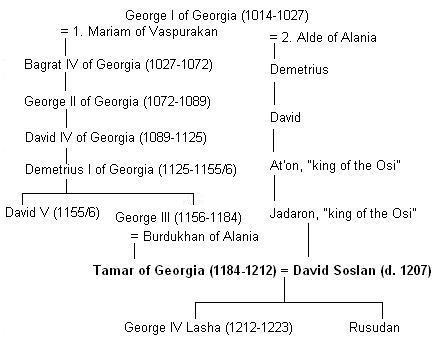
David Soslan's genealogy suggested by Prince Vakhushti of Georgia.

David Soslan was a member of the royal house which ruled Alania (Ovseti or Oseti in the Georgian sources; hence, the modern designation of Ossetia), an Orthodox Christian kingdom in the North Caucasus, and frequently intermarried with the Bagrationi dynasty of Georgia. An anonymous chronicler, writing during the reign of George IV Lasha (son of Tamar and David Soslan; r. 1213–1223), ascribes to Soslan a Bagratid ancestry. A version of his Bagratid origin found further development in the works of the 18th-century Georgian scholar Prince Vakhushti of Kartli: He considered Soslan to be a descendant of George I of Georgia (r. 1014–1027) and his Alan wife Alde who were the parents of Prince Demetrius (Demetre), an unfortunate pretender to the Georgian crown whose son, David, was forced by Bagrat IV of Georgia to flee to Alania. According to Vakhushti, David and his descendants - Aton and Jadaron - married into the Alan ruling family and became "kings of the Osi" [i.e., Alans]. This Jadaron is said to have been Soslan's father. While this account is considered credible by the modern scholars such as Mariam Lordkipanidze and Cyril Toumanoff the issue of Soslan's origin still remains uncertain.

A passage from the 13th-century anonymous Georgian Histories and Eulogies of Sovereigns relates that David was under the patronage of Tamar's paternal aunt Rusudan and came of "the descendants [ძენი; literally, "sons"] of Ephraïm, which are Osi, handsome and strong in battle." The Georgian scholar Korneli Kekelidze suggested that David Soslan's family – the "Ephraïmids" – might have claimed descent from the biblical Ephraim, and compared this family legend to that of the Bagratids who considered themselves descendants of David, the second king of the Israelites.

In 1946, the North Ossetian archaeologist Evgeniya Pchelina announced that, during the digs at the Nuzal chapel in the Ardon Gorge, North Ossetian ASSR, she discovered the tomb allegedly belonging to David Soslan whom she identified with the certain Soslan mentioned in the Georgian asomtavruli inscription in the chapel, potentially reinforcing the popular theory of David Soslan being a member of the Tsarazon family (Iron Ossetic: Цæразонтæ), a heroic clan from Nuzal known to the Ossetian oral folk tradition. The hypothesis has not been accepted by most scholars, but enjoys popularity among the Ossetian historians.

== Biography ==
Tamar married David Soslan at the Didube Palace near Tbilisi between 1187 and 1189 after she divorced her first husband, the Rus' prince Yury Bogolyubsky. As the Armenian chronicler Mkhitar Gosh reports in his Ishatarakan ("Memorabilia"), Tamar "married a man from the Alan kingdom, her relative on the mother's side, whose name was Soslan, named David upon his ascension to the [Georgian] throne".

In contrast to Yuri who was a candidate of the powerful nobles party, David was Tamar's personal choice. David, a capable military commander, became Tamar's major supporter and was instrumental in defeating the rebellious nobles rallied behind Yuri. Tamar and David had two children. In 1192, the queen gave birth to a son, George – the future king George IV (Lasha) – an event widely celebrated in the kingdom. The daughter, Rusudan, was born in 1194 and would succeed her brother as sovereign of Georgia.

David Soslan's status as Tamar's husband, as well as his presence in art, on charters and on coins, was strictly dictated by the necessity of male aspects of kingship, but he remained a subordinate ruler who shared the throne with Tamar but had no independent authority, his power being derived from his reigning spouse.

David energetically supported Tamar's expansionist policy and was responsible for Georgia's military successes in a series of conflicts of those years. Medieval Georgian sources praise his handsomeness, military talents, valor, and devotion to Tamar. In the 1190s, David Soslan led the Georgian raids against Barda, Erzurum, Geghark'unik', Beylaqan and Ganja. His victories over the Ildegizids of Azerbaijan at Shamkor (1195) and the Seljuqids of Rüm at Basian (1202) secured the Georgian positions in the eastern and western Caucasian marches, respectively. He died shortly thereafter, c. 1207.

== Sources ==
- Salbiev, Tamerlan (2021). "Šošlan". In Yarshater, Ehsan (ed.). Encyclopædia Iranica (Online ed.). Encyclopædia Iranica Foundation.

Royal titles
Preceded by Yury Bogolyubsky	King consort of Georgia c. 1187/1189 – c. 1207	Succeeded by Ghias ad-din
