= Tsatsloba =

Traditional Georgian custom

Tsatsloba (წაწლობა), also known as stsorproba in Khevsureti, was a traditional Georgian custom in which a young man and woman shared a bed overnight without engaging in sexual relations. In certain regions, this arrangement could involve an older male guest and the host's daughter, though it more commonly took place between peers. The practice was explicitly distinct from courtship, as there was a strong cultural taboo against such encounters leading to marriage.

This custom persisted in Georgian highland communities until the mid-20th century, reportedly remaining in practice into the 1950s.

== History ==
Tsatsloba (or Stsorproba) was a traditional social custom historically practiced in the highland regions of eastern Georgia, notably among the Khevsurians (who termed it stsorproba) and Pshavians (who called it tsatsloba). The custom has been the subject of considerable scholarly attention, with varying interpretations regarding its origins, functions, and social significance.

According to local oral traditions the custom originated during periods of frequent incursions by neighboring groups. During these times, women, children, and the elderly sought refuge in defensive towers, sharing living quarters under one felt covering. In the aftermath of conflict, these close communal living arrangements continued, eventually evolving into regulated courtship practices prior to marriage, which later formalized as tsatsloba.

The practice was primarily observed by adolescents and unmarried young people, with implicit approval from the elder generation. It involved pairs meeting and lying beside one another fully clothed, with limited forms of physical affection permitted—such as embracing or kissing—while sexual intercourse was strictly prohibited. Violations of this proscription, particularly resulting in childbirth, were met with severe communal sanctions, including public execution by stoning or lifelong social exclusion for the mother, according to ethnographic accounts by Sergi Makalatia and references in the works of Vazha-Pshavela.

Scholars have variously interpreted tsatsloba as a form of social initiation, designed to prepare the youth for adult responsibilities, instill communal values, and foster emotional restraint and endurance. The practice functioned within a broader framework of artificial kinship and social regulation characteristic of traditional highland Georgian societies.
