= Four Gospels (disambiguation) =

The Four Gospels may refer to:

- Canonical gospels, the four Christian gospels included in the New Testament
  - Four Gospels of Ivan Alexander, a 14th-century illuminated manuscript prepared and illustrated during the rule of Tsar Ivan Alexander
  - Vani Four Gospels, a 12th to 14th-century illuminated manuscript of the gospels in the Georgian Nuskhuri script
  - The Four Gospels (Gundulić), the first book printed in Belgrade, by Trojan Gundulić in 1552
  - Четвероевангеліе (The Four Gospels), a manuscript of the canonical Gospels printed by Pyotr Mstislavets in 1574–1575
- The Four Gospels: A Study of Origins, a 1924 book of biblical scholarship by Burnett Hillman Streeter

== See also ==
- Gospel harmony, attempts to compile the canonical gospels into a single account
- Four Evangelists, the authors of the canonical gospels
