= Tamar of Georgia =

Queen of Georgia from 1184 to 1213

Tamar the Great თამარ მეფე
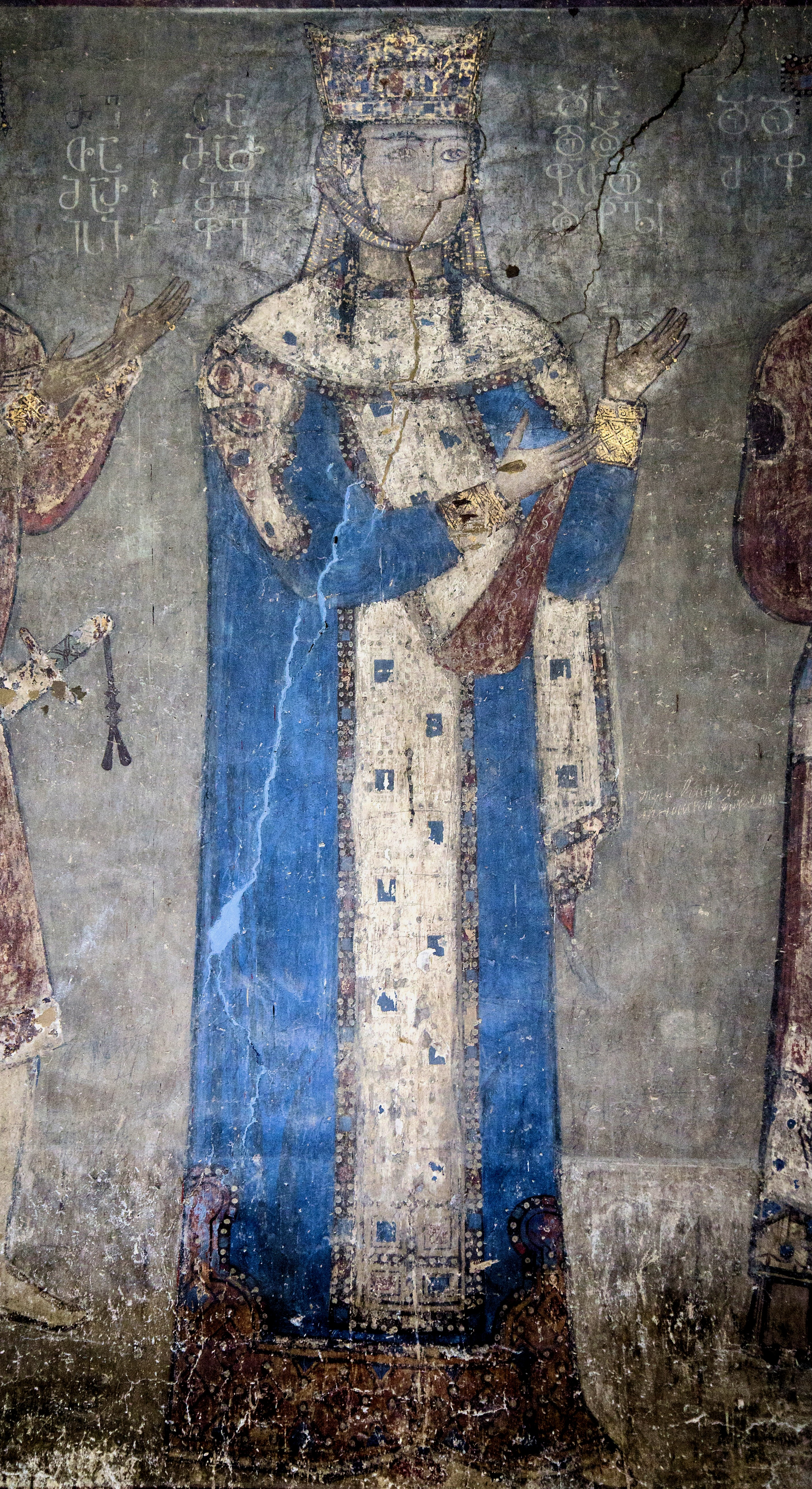
- An early 13th-century fresco of Queen Tamar from Betania Monastery

Queen of Georgia
- Reign: 27 March 1184 – 18 January 1213
- Coronation: 1178 as co-regent 1184 as sole queen Gelati Monastery
- Predecessor: George III
- Successor: George IV
- Born: c. 1160 or c. 1166
- Died: 18 January 1213; Agarani Castle
- Spouse: Yury Bogolyubsky (m. 1185; div. 1187) David Soslan (m. 1191; died 1207)
- Issue: George IV of Georgia; Rusudan of Georgia
- Dynasty: Bagrationi
- Father: George III of Georgia
- Mother: Burdukhan of Alania
- Religion: Georgian Orthodox Royal monogram

- Khelrtva

Tamar the Great (Georgian: თამარ მეფე, romanized: tamar mepe [ˈt̪ʰämäɾ ˈme̞pʰe̞], lit. 'King Tamar'; c. 1160 or c. 1166 – 18 January 1213) reigned as the Queen of Georgia from 1184 to 1213, presiding over the apex of the Georgian Golden Age. A member of the Bagrationi dynasty, her position as the first woman to rule Georgia in her own right was emphasized by the title mepe ("King"), afforded to Tamar in the medieval Georgian sources.

Tamar was proclaimed heir and co-ruler by her reigning father George III in 1178, but she faced significant opposition from the aristocracy upon her ascension to full ruling powers after George's death. Tamar was successful in neutralizing this opposition and embarked on an energetic foreign policy aided by the decline of the hostile Seljuk Turks. Relying on a powerful military elite, Tamar was able to build on the successes of her predecessors to consolidate an empire which dominated the Caucasus until its collapse under the Mongol attacks within two decades after Tamar's death.

Tamar was married twice, her first union being, from 1185 to 1187, to Yury Bogolyubsky of the Grand Principality of Vladimir, whom she divorced and expelled from the country, defeating his subsequent coup attempts. For her second husband Tamar chose, in 1191, the Alan prince David Soslan, by whom she had two children, George and Rusudan, the two successive monarchs on the throne of Georgia.

Tamar's reign is associated with a period of marked political and military successes and cultural achievements. This, combined with her role as a female ruler, has contributed to her status as an idealized and romanticized figure in Georgian arts and historical memory. She remains an important symbol in Georgian popular culture.

== Early life and ascent to the throne ==
Born around 1160, or 1166, Tamar was the daughter of George III, King of Georgia, and his consort Burdukhan, a daughter of the king of Alania. While it is possible that Tamar had a younger sister, Rusudan, she is only mentioned once in all contemporary accounts of Tamar's reign. The name Tamar is of Hebrew origin and, like other biblical names, was favored by the Georgian Bagrationi dynasty because of their claim to be descended from David, the second king of Israel.

Tamar's youth coincided with a major upheaval in Georgia; in 1177, her father, George III, was confronted by a rebellious faction of nobles. The rebels intended to dethrone George in favor of the king's fraternal nephew, Prince Demna, who was considered by many to be a legitimate royal heir of his murdered father, David V. Demna's cause was little but a pretext for the nobles, led by the pretender's father-in-law, the amirspasalar ("high constable") Ivane II Orbeli, to weaken the crown. George III was able to crush the revolt and embarked on a crackdown campaign on the defiant aristocratic clans; Ivane Orbeli was put to death and the surviving members of his family were driven out of Georgia. Demna, castrated and blinded on his uncle's order, did not survive the mutilation and soon died in prison. Once the rebellion was suppressed and the pretender eliminated, George went ahead to co-opt Tamar into government with him and crowned her as co-ruler in 1178. By doing so, the king attempted to preempt any dispute after his death and legitimize his line on the throne of Georgia. At the same time, he raised men from the Kipchaks as well as from the gentry and unranked classes to keep the dynastic aristocracy away from the center of power.

== Early reign ==
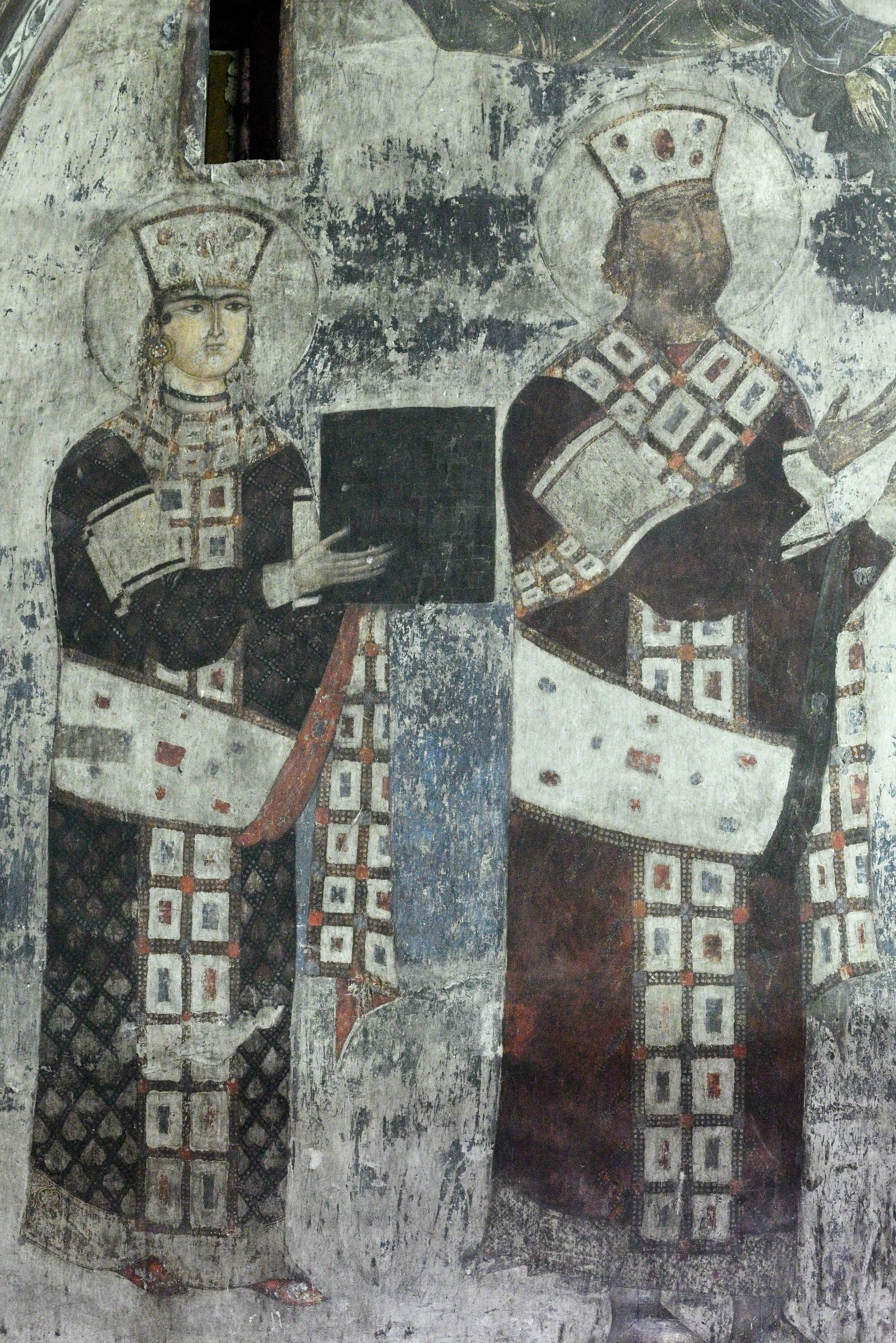
Tamar (left) and George III (right). The earliest surviving portrait of Tamar from the church of the Dormition at Vardzia, c. 1184–1186.

For six years, Tamar was a co-ruler with her father. Upon his death, in 1184, Tamar continued as the sole monarch and was crowned a second time at the Gelati cathedral near Kutaisi, western Georgia. She inherited a relatively strong kingdom, but the centrifugal tendencies fostered by the great nobles were far from being quelled. There was considerable opposition to Tamar's succession; this was sparked by a reaction against the repressive policies of her father and encouraged by the new sovereign's other perceived weakness, her sex. As Georgia had never previously had a female ruler, a part of the aristocracy questioned Tamar's legitimacy, while others tried to exploit her youth and supposed weakness to assert greater autonomy for themselves. The energetic involvement of Tamar's influential aunt Rusudan and the Catholicos-Patriarch Michael IV was crucial for legitimizing Tamar's succession to the throne. However, the young queen was forced into making significant concessions to the aristocracy. She had to reward the Catholicos-Patriarch Michael's support by making him a chancellor, thus placing him at the top of both the clerical and secular hierarchies.

Tamar was also pressured into dismissing her father's appointees, among them the constable Kubasar, a Georgian Kipchak of ignoble birth, who had helped George III in his crackdown on the defiant nobility. One of the few untitled servitors of George III to escape this fate was the treasurer Qutlu Arslan who now led a group of nobles and wealthy citizens in a struggle to limit the royal authority by creating a new council, karavi, whose members would alone deliberate and decide policy. This attempt at "feudal constitutionalism" was rendered abortive when Tamar had Qutlu Arslan arrested and his supporters were inveigled into submission. Yet, Tamar's first moves to reduce the power of the aristocratic élite were unsuccessful. She failed in her attempt to use a church synod to dismiss the Catholicos-Patriarch, and the noble council, Darbazi, asserted the right to approve royal decrees.

=== Marriages ===
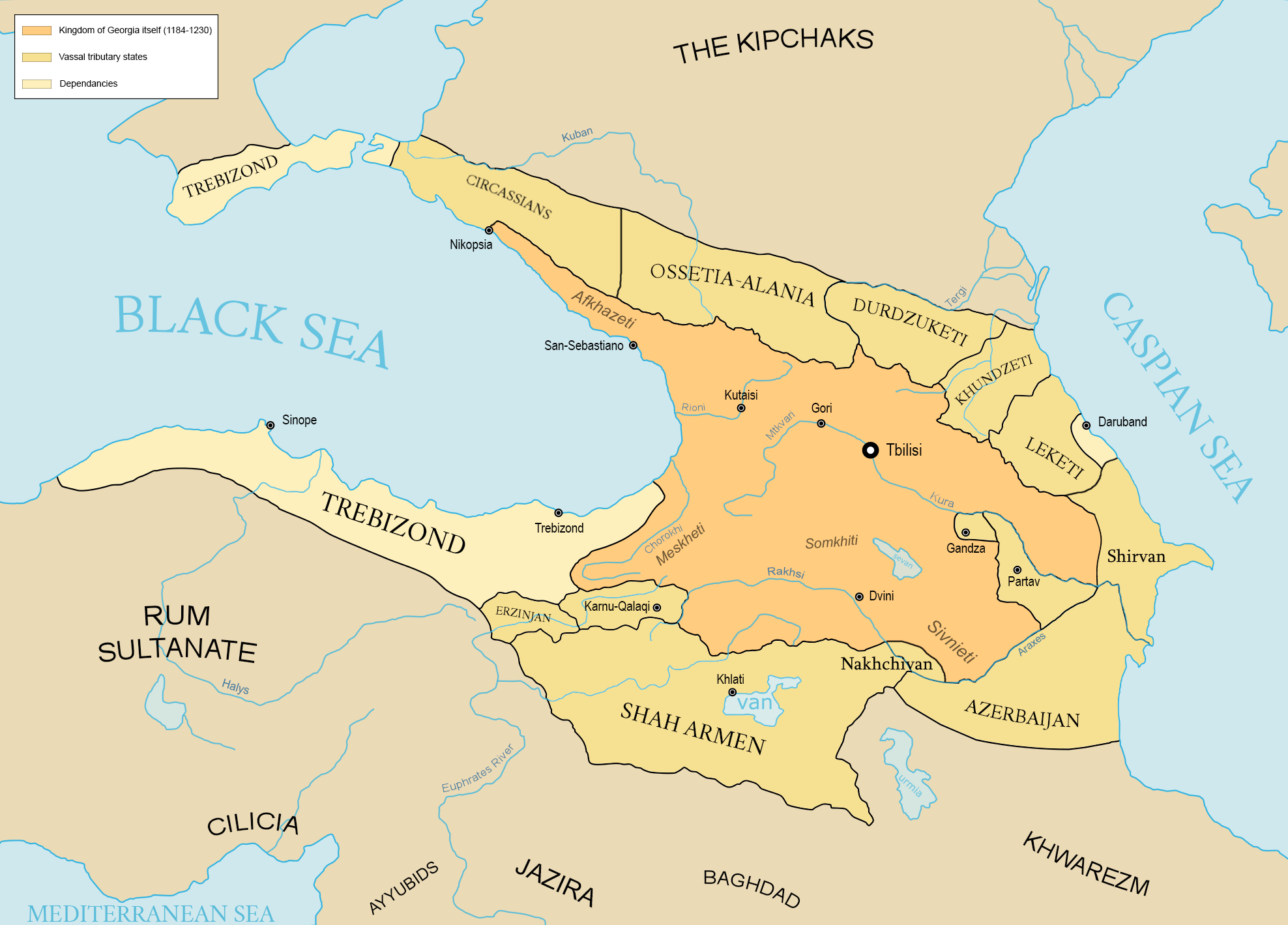
The Kingdom of Georgia at its greatest extent, with its tributaries and spheres of influence in the reign of Tamar.

Queen Tamar's marriage was a question of state importance. Pursuant to dynastic imperatives and the ethos of the time, the nobles required Tamar to marry in order to have a leader for the army and to provide an heir to the throne. Every group strove to select and secure the acceptance of its candidate in order to strengthen its position and influence at court. Two main factions fought for the influence in Tamar's court: the clans of Mkhargrdzeli and Abulasan. The faction of the Abulasan won, the choice was approved by Tamar's aunt Rusudan and the council of feudal lords. Their choice fell on Yury, son of the murdered prince Andrey Bogolyubsky of Vladimir-Suzdal, who later lived as a refugee among the Kipchaks of the North Caucasus. They called an influential person in the kingdom, the great merchant Zankan Zorababeli. He was given the mission of bringing the bridegroom to Tbilisi. He fulfilled his mission with zeal, and the prince was brought to Georgia to marry the queen in 1185.

The young man – "valiant, perfect of body and pleasant to behold" – Yury proved to be an able soldier, but a difficult person, and he soon ran afoul of his wife. The strained spousal relations paralleled a factional struggle at the royal court in which Tamar was becoming more and more assertive of her rights as a queen regnant. The turning point in Tamar's fortunes came with the death of the powerful Catholicos-Patriarch Michael, whom the queen replaced as a chancellor with her supporter Anton Gnolistavisdze. Tamar gradually expanded her own power-base and elevated her loyal nobles to high positions at the court, most notably the Mkhargrdzeli.

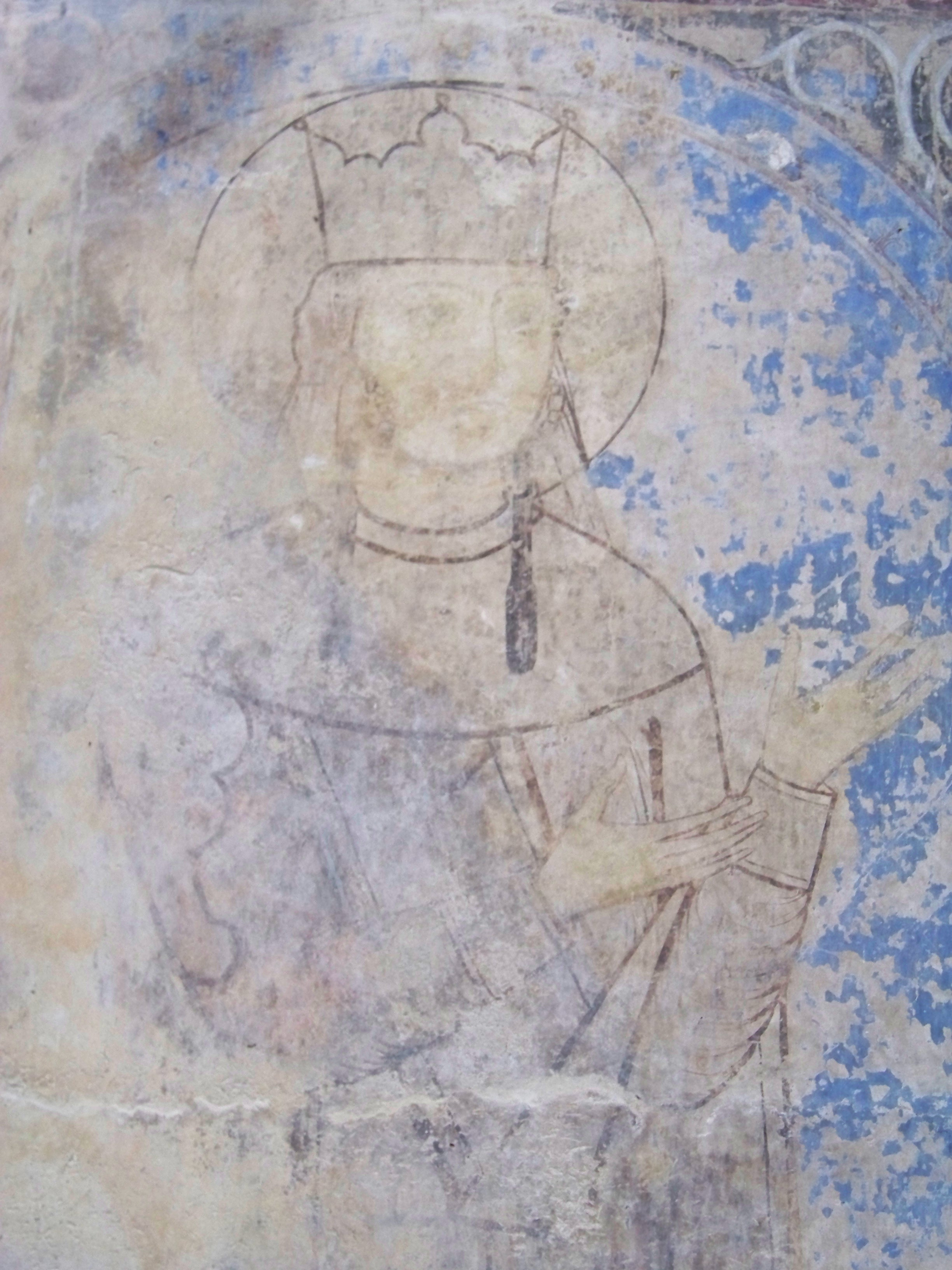
Tamar as depicted on a 13th-century mural from the Kintsvisi monastery.

In 1187, Tamar persuaded the noble council to approve her divorce from Yury, who was accused of drunkenness and "sodomy" and was sent off to Constantinople. Assisted by several Georgian aristocrats anxious to check Tamar's growing power, Yury made two coup attempts, but failed and went off to obscurity after 1191. The queen chose her second husband herself. He was David Soslan, an Alan prince, to whom the 18th-century Georgian scholar Prince Vakhushti ascribes descent from the early 11th-century Georgian king George I. David, a capable military commander, became Tamar's major supporter and was instrumental in defeating the rebellious nobles who rallied behind Yury.

Tamar and David had two children. In 1192 or 1194, the queen gave birth to a son, George-Lasha, the future king George IV. The daughter, Rusudan, was born c. 1195 and would succeed her brother as a sovereign of Georgia.

David Soslan's status of a king consort, as well as his presence in art, on charters, and on coins, was dictated by the necessity of male aspects of kingship, but he remained a subordinate ruler who shared the throne with and derived his power from Tamar. Tamar continued to be styled as mepeta mepe – "king of kings". In Georgian, a language with no grammatical genders, mepe ("monarch, king, queen") does not necessarily imply a masculine connotation and can be rendered as a "sovereign". The female equivalent of mepe is dedopali ("queen"), which was applied to wives or other senior female relatives of kings. Tamar is occasionally called dedopali and dedopalta dedopali in the Georgian chronicles and on some charters. Thus, the title of mepe might have been applied to Tamar to mark out her unique position among women.

== Foreign policy and military campaigns ==
=== Muslim neighbors ===
Approximate dates of Georgian control. Mouseover for name.
Blue circle=Capital
Black dot=Georgian held cities and fortresses
Red dot=Conquered cities and fortresses
X=Major battles

Once Tamar succeeded in consolidating her power and found a reliable support in David Soslan, the Mkhargrdzeli, Toreli, and other noble families, she revived the expansionist foreign policy of her predecessors. Repeated occasions of dynastic strife in Georgia combined with the efforts of regional successors of the Seljuk Empire such as the Eldiguzids, Shirvanshahs, and Shah-Armens, had slowed down the dynamic of conquest the Georgians had achieved during the reigns of Tamar's great-grandfather, David IV, and her father, George III. However, the Georgians became again active under Tamar, more prominently in the second decade of her rule. Early in the 1190s, the Georgian government began to interfere in the affairs of the Eldiguzids and of the Shirvanshahs, aiding rivaling local princes and reducing Shirvan to a tributary state. The Eldiguzid atabeg Abu Bakr attempted to stem the Georgian advance, but suffered a defeat at the hands of David Soslan at the Battle of Shamkor and lost his capital to a Georgian protégé in 1195. Although Abu Bakr was able to resume his reign a year later, the Eldiguzids were only barely able to contain further Georgian forays.

The question of the liberation of Armenia remained of prime importance in Georgia's foreign policy. Tamar's armies led by two Armenian generals, Zakare and Ivane Mkhargrdzeli (Zakarian), overran fortresses and cities towards the Ararat Plain, reclaiming one after another fortresses and districts from local Muslim rulers.

Alarmed by the Georgian successes, Suleiman II, the resurgent Seljukid Sultan of Rum, rallied his vassal emirs and marched against Georgia, but his camp was attacked and destroyed by David Soslan at the Battle of Basian in 1202, 1203 or 1204. The chronicler of Tamar describes how the army was assembled at the rock-hewn town of Vardzia before marching on to Basian and how the queen addressed the troops from the balcony of the church. Exploiting her success in this battle, between 1203 and 1205 Georgians seized the town of Dvin and entered Shah-Armens possessions twice and subdued the emir of Kars (vassal of the Saltukids in Erzurum), the Shah-Armens, and the emirs of Erzurum and Erzincan.

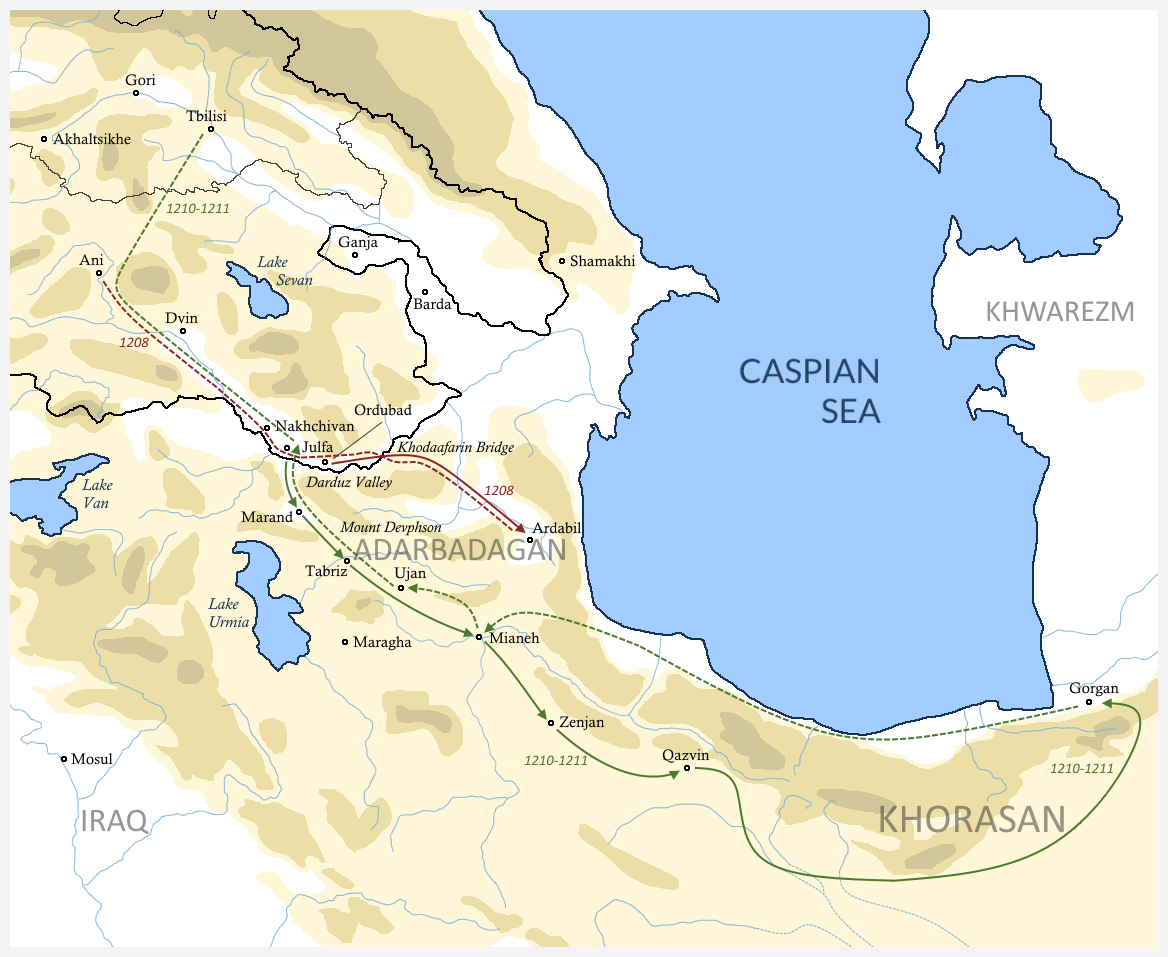
Eldiguzid campaign of Tamar of Georgia in 1208 and 1210–1211 years.

In 1206, the Georgian army, under the command of David Soslan, captured Kars and other fortresses and strongholds along the Araxes. This campaign was evidently started because the ruler of Erzerum refused to submit to Georgia. The emir of Kars requested aid from the Shah-Armens, but the latter was unable to respond, it was soon taken over by the Ayyubid Sultanate in 1207. By 1209 Georgia challenged Ayyubid rule in eastern Anatolia and led a liberation war for south Armenia. The Georgian army besieged Khlat. In response Ayyubid Sultan al-Adil I assembled and personally led a large Muslim army that included the emirs of Homs, Hama, and Baalbek as well as contingents from other Ayyubid principalities to support al-Awhad, emir of Jazira. During the siege, Georgian general Ivane Mkhargrdzeli accidentally fell into the hands of the al-Awhad on the outskirts of Ahlat. Using Ivane as a bargaining chip, al-Awhad agreed to release him in return for a thirty year truce with Georgia, thus ending the immediate Georgian threat to the Ayyubids. This brought the struggle for the Armenian lands to a stall, leaving the Lake Van region to the Ayyubids of Damascus.

In 1209, starting the Georgian campaign against the Eldiguzids, the brothers Mkhargrzeli laid waste to Ardabil – according to the Georgian and Armenian annals – as a revenge for the local Muslim ruler's attack on Ani and his massacre of the city's Christian population. In a great final burst, the brothers led an army marshaled throughout Tamar's possessions and vassal territories in a march, through Nakhchivan and Julfa, to Marand, Tabriz, and Qazvin in northwest Iran, pillaging several settlements on their way.

=== Trebizond and the Middle East ===
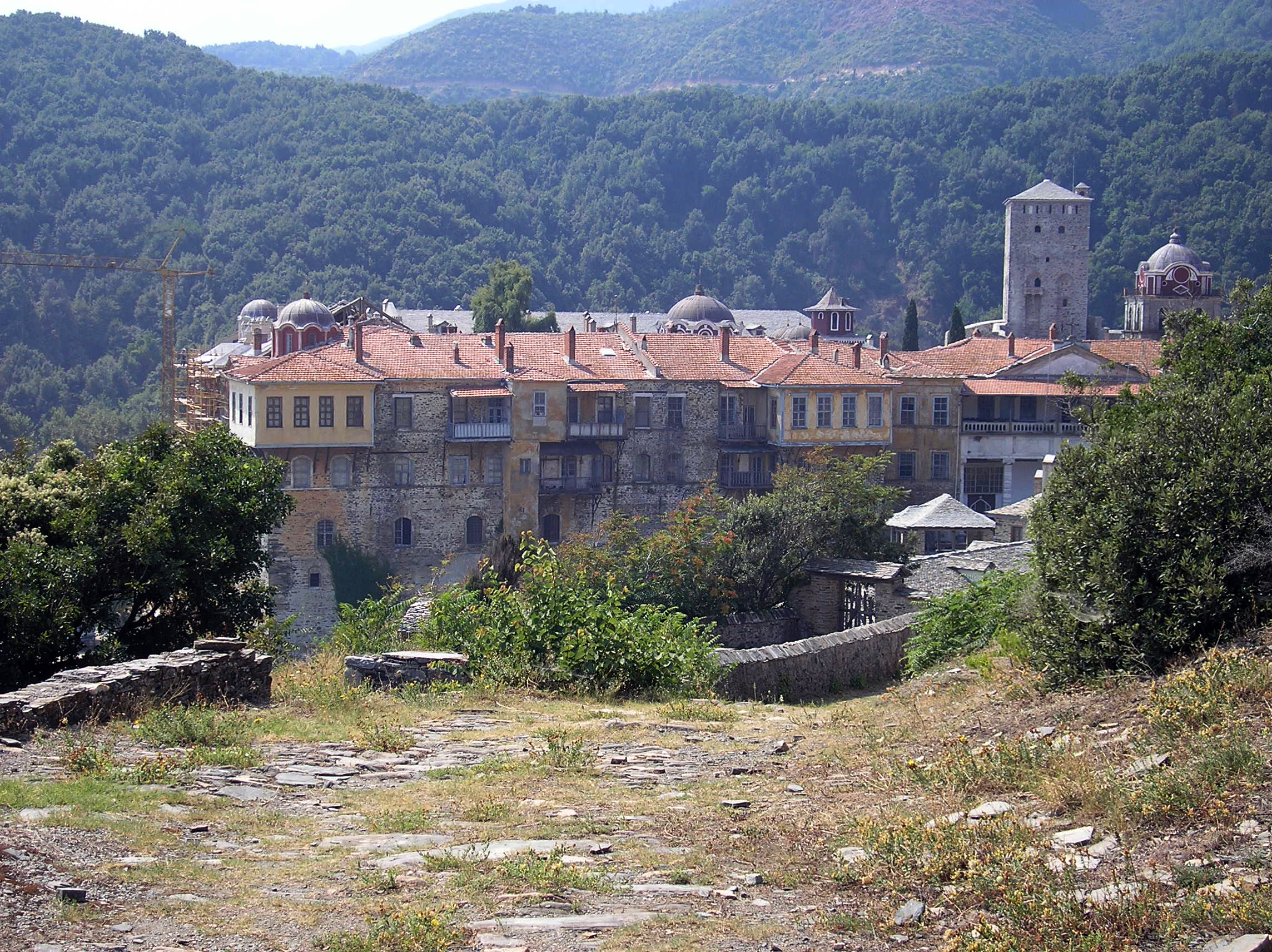
The Iviron monastery on Mount Athos, a major center of Christian culture favored by the Georgian crown.

Among the remarkable events of Tamar's reign was the foundation of the Empire of Trebizond on the Black Sea coast in 1204. This state was established by Alexios I Megas Komnenos (r. 1204–1222) and his brother, David, in the northeastern Pontic provinces of the crumbling Byzantine Empire with the aid of Georgian troops. Alexios and David, Tamar's nephews, were fugitive Byzantine princes raised at the Georgian court. According to Tamar's historian, the aim of the Georgian expedition to Trebizond was to punish the Byzantine emperor Alexios IV Angelos (r. 1203–1204) for his confiscation of a shipment of money from the Georgian queen to the monasteries of Antioch and Mount Athos. However, Tamar's Pontic endeavor can better be explained by her desire to take advantage of the Western European Fourth Crusade against Constantinople to set up a friendly state in Georgia's immediate southwestern neighborhood, as well as by the dynastic solidarity to the dispossessed Komnenoi. Tamar sought to make use of the weakness of the Byzantine Empire and the Crusaders' defeat at the hands of the Ayyubid sultan Saladin in order to gain Georgia's position on the international stage and to assume the traditional role of the Byzantine crown as a protector of the Christians of the Middle East. Christian Georgian missionaries were active in the North Caucasus and the expatriate monastic communities were scattered throughout the Eastern Mediterranean. Tamar's chronicle praises her universal protection of Christianity and her support of churches and monasteries from Egypt to Bulgaria and Cyprus.

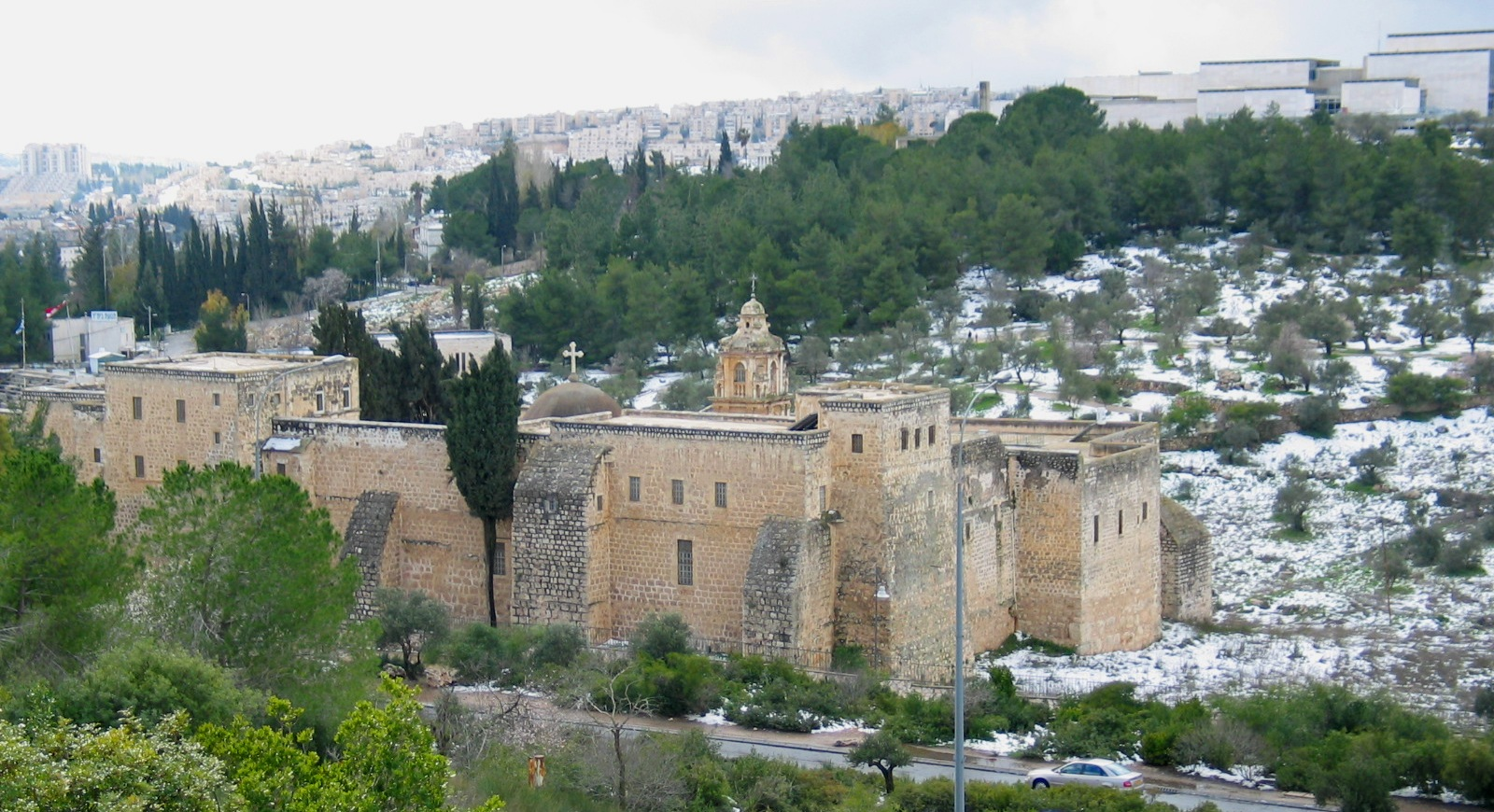
The Monastery of the Cross in Jerusalem was formerly populated by the Georgian monks and patronized by Queen Tamar.

The Georgian court was primarily concerned with the protection of the Georgian monastic centers in the Holy Land. By the 12th century, eight Georgian monasteries were listed in Jerusalem. Saladin's biographer, Baha ad-Din ibn Shaddad, reports that after the Ayyubid conquest of Jerusalem in 1187, Tamar sent envoys to the sultan to request that the confiscated possessions of the Georgian monasteries in Jerusalem be returned. Saladin's response is not recorded, but the queen's efforts seem to have been successful: James of Vitry, who attained to the bishopric of Acre shortly after Tamar's death, gives further evidence of the Georgians' presence in Jerusalem. He writes that the Georgians were – in contrast to the other Christian pilgrims – allowed a free passage into the city, with their banners unfurled. Ibn Shaddad furthermore claims that Tamar outbid the Byzantine emperor in her efforts to obtain the relics of the True Cross, offering 200,000 gold pieces to Saladin who had taken the relics as booty at the Battle of Hattin – to no avail, however.

== Golden age ==
=== Feudal monarchy ===
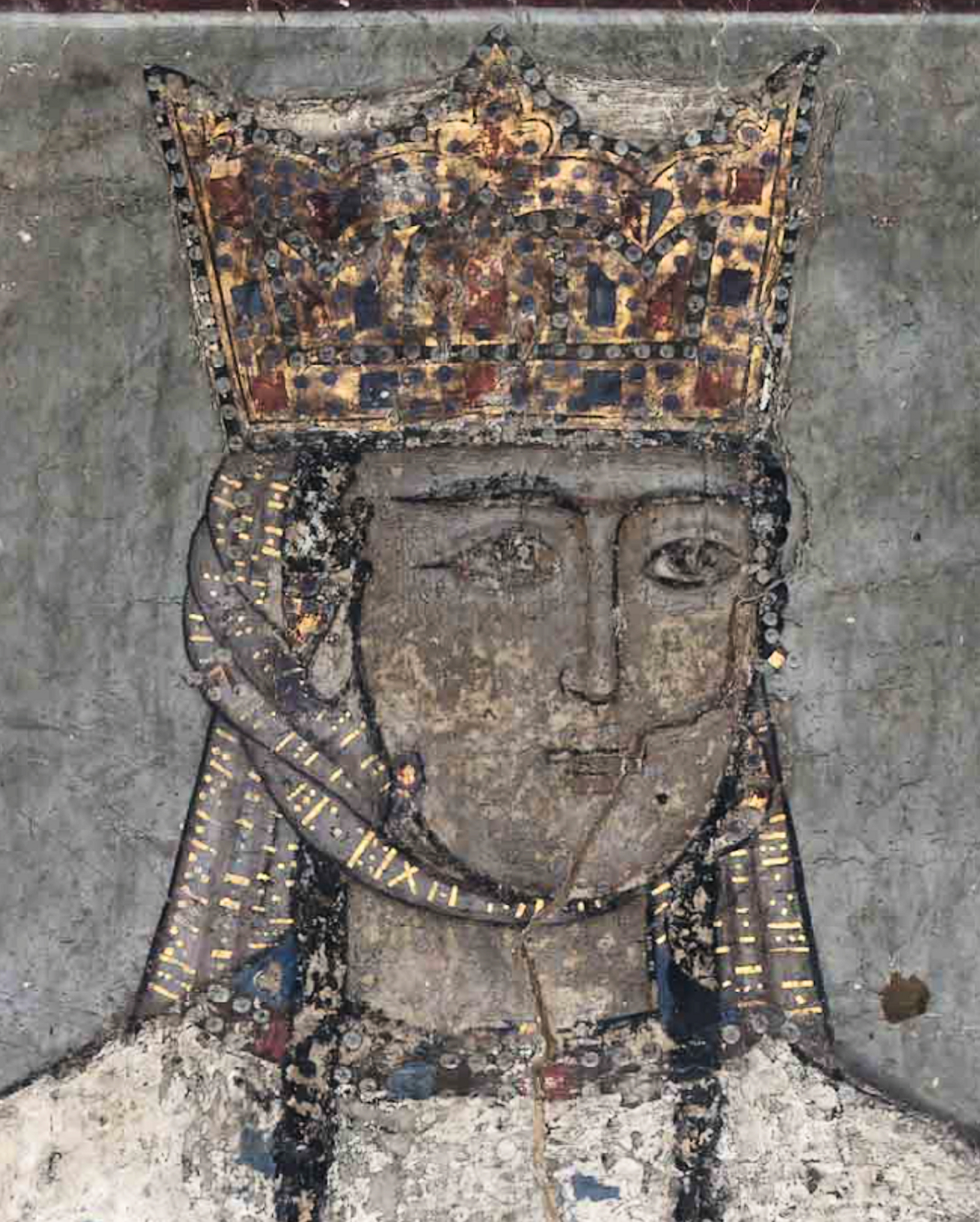
A fragment of the early 13th-century fresco of Queen Tamar from Betania.

Georgia's political and cultural exploits of Tamar's epoch were rooted in a long and complex past. Tamar owed her accomplishments most immediately to the reforms of her great-grandfather David IV (r. 1089–1125) and, more remotely, to the unifying efforts of David III and Bagrat III who became architects of a political unity of Georgian kingdoms and principalities in the opening decade of the 11th century. Tamar was able to build upon their successes. By the last years of Tamar's reign, the Georgian state had reached the zenith of its power and prestige in the Middle Ages. Tamar's realm stretched from the Greater Caucasus crest in the north to Erzurum in the south, and from the Zygii in the northwest to the vicinity of Ganja in the southeast, forming a pan-Caucasian empire, with the loyal Zachariad regime in northern and central Armenia, Shirvan as a vassal and Trebizond as an ally. A contemporary Georgian historian extols Tamar as the master of the lands "from the Sea of Pontus [i.e., the Black Sea] to the Sea of Gurgan [i.e., the Caspian Sea], from Speri to Derbend, and all the Hither and the Thither Caucasus up to Khazaria and Scythia."

The royal title was correspondingly aggrandized. It now reflected not only Tamar's sway over the traditional subdivisions of the Georgian realm, but also included new components, emphasizing the Georgian crown's hegemony over the neighboring lands. Thus, on the coins and charters issued in her name, Tamar is identified as:

By the will of God, King of Kings and Queen of Queens of the Abkhazians, (Note: In the Middle Ages, the terms "Abkhazia" and "Abkhazians" were predominantly used in a wider sense, covering, for all practical purposes, the whole of western Georgia. It was not until the 15th/16th century, after the fragmentation of the unified Georgian kingdom, that these terms resumed their original, restricted sense, referring to the territory that corresponds to modern-day Abkhazia and to the ethnic group living there. Barthold, Wasil & Minorsky, Vladimir, "Abkhaz", in The Encyclopaedia of Islam, Vol. 1, 1960.) Kartvelians, (Note: "Kartvelians", the modern self-designation of the Georgians, originally referred to the inhabitants of the core central Georgian province of Kartli (Iberia in Classical and Byzantine Greek sources). By the early 9th century, the Georgian literati had expanded the meaning of "Kartli" to other areas of medieval Georgia held together by religion, culture, and language (Rapp 2003, pp. 429–430).) Arranians, Kakhetians, and Armenians; Shirvanshah and Shahanshah; Autocrat of all the East and the West, Glory of the World and Faith; Champion of the Messiah.

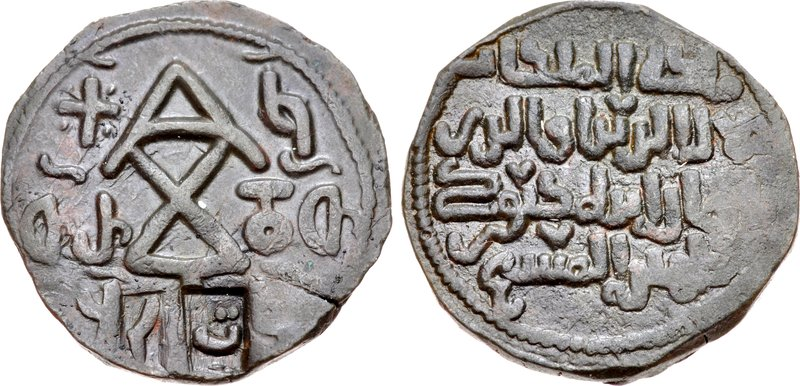
A copper coin with Georgian and Arabic inscriptions featuring Tamar's monogram (1200).

The queen never achieved autocratic powers and the noble council continued to function. However, Tamar's own prestige and the expansion of patronq'moba – a Georgian version of feudalism – kept the more powerful dynastic princes from fragmenting the kingdom. This period marked the apex of Georgian feudalism. Attempts at transplanting feudal practices in the areas where they had previously been almost unknown did not pass without resistance. There was a revolt among the mountainers of Pkhovi and Dido on Georgia's northeastern frontier in 1212, which was put down by Ivane Mkhargrzeli after three months of heavy fighting.

With flourishing commercial centers now under Georgia's control, industry and commerce brought new wealth to the country and the court. Tribute extracted from the neighbors and war booty added to the royal treasury, giving rise to the saying that "the peasants were like nobles, the nobles like princes, and the princes like kings."

=== Culture ===
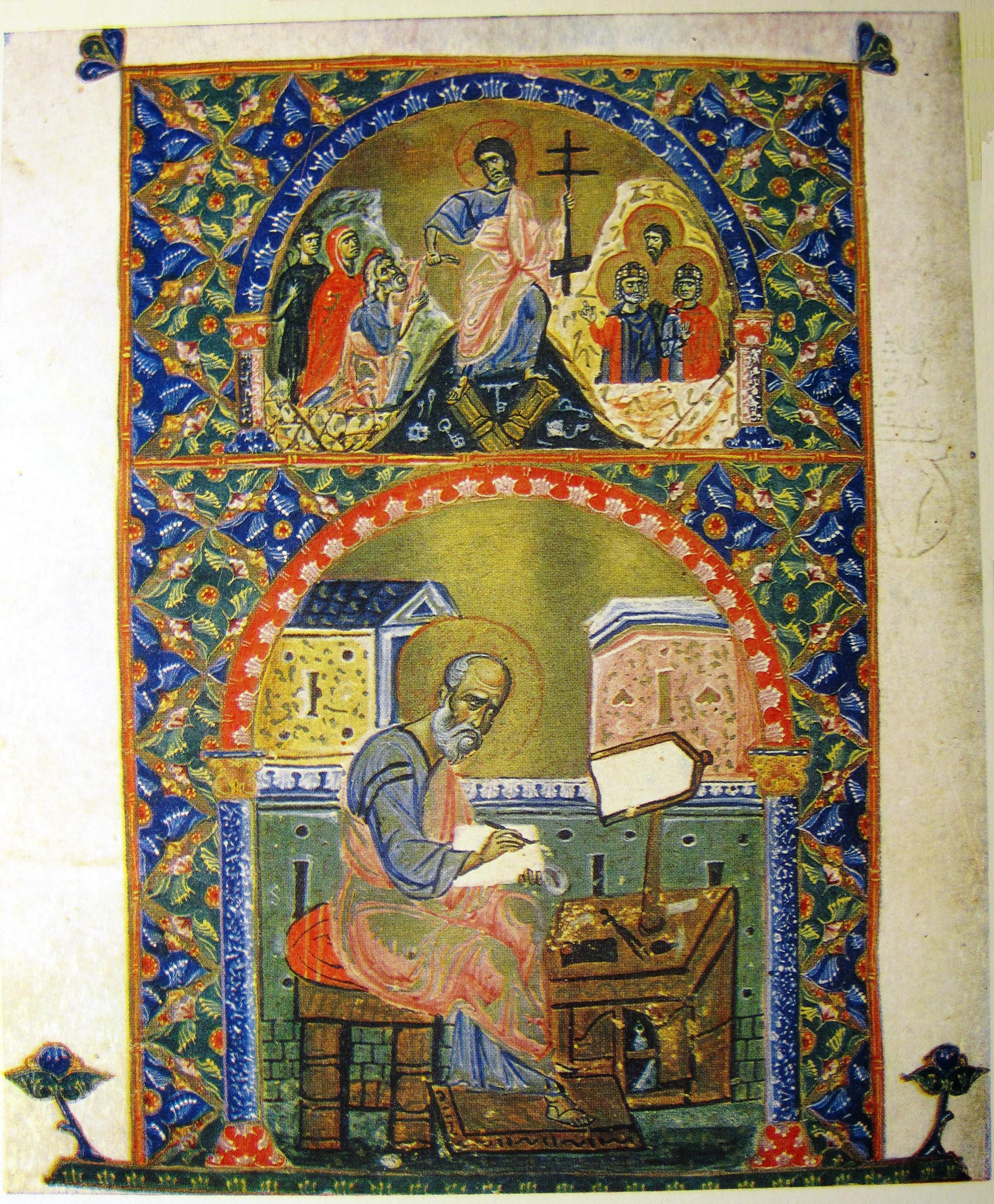
A folio from the Vani Gospels manuscript, copied at the behest of Queen Tamar.

With this prosperity came an outburst of the distinct Georgian culture, emerging from the amalgam of Christian, secular, as well as Byzantine and Iranian influences. Despite this, the Georgians continued to identify with the Byzantine West, rather than Islamic East, with the Georgian monarchy seeking to underscore its association with Christianity and present its position as God-given. It was in that period that the canon of Georgian Orthodox architecture was redesigned and a series of large-scale domed cathedrals were built. The Byzantine-derived expression of royal power was modified in various ways to bolster Tamar's unprecedented position as a woman ruling in her own right. The five extant monumental church portraits of the queen are clearly modeled on Byzantine imagery, but also highlight specifically Georgian themes and Persian-type ideals of female beauty. Despite Georgia's Byzantine-leaning culture, the country's intimate trade connections with the Middle East is evidenced on contemporary Georgian coinage, whose legends were composed in Georgian and Arabic. A series of coins minted in circa 1200 in the name of Queen Tamar depicted a local variant of the Byzantine obverse and an Arabic inscription on the reverse proclaiming Tamar as the "Champion of the Messiah".

The contemporary Georgian chronicles enshrined Christian morality and patristic literature continued to flourish, but it had, by that time, lost its earlier dominant position to secular literature, which was highly original, even though it developed close contact with neighboring cultures. The trend culminated in Shota Rustaveli's epic poem The Knight in the Panther's Skin (Vepkhistq'aosani), which celebrates the ideals of an "Age of Chivalry" and is revered in Georgia as the greatest achievement of native literature.

== Death and burial ==
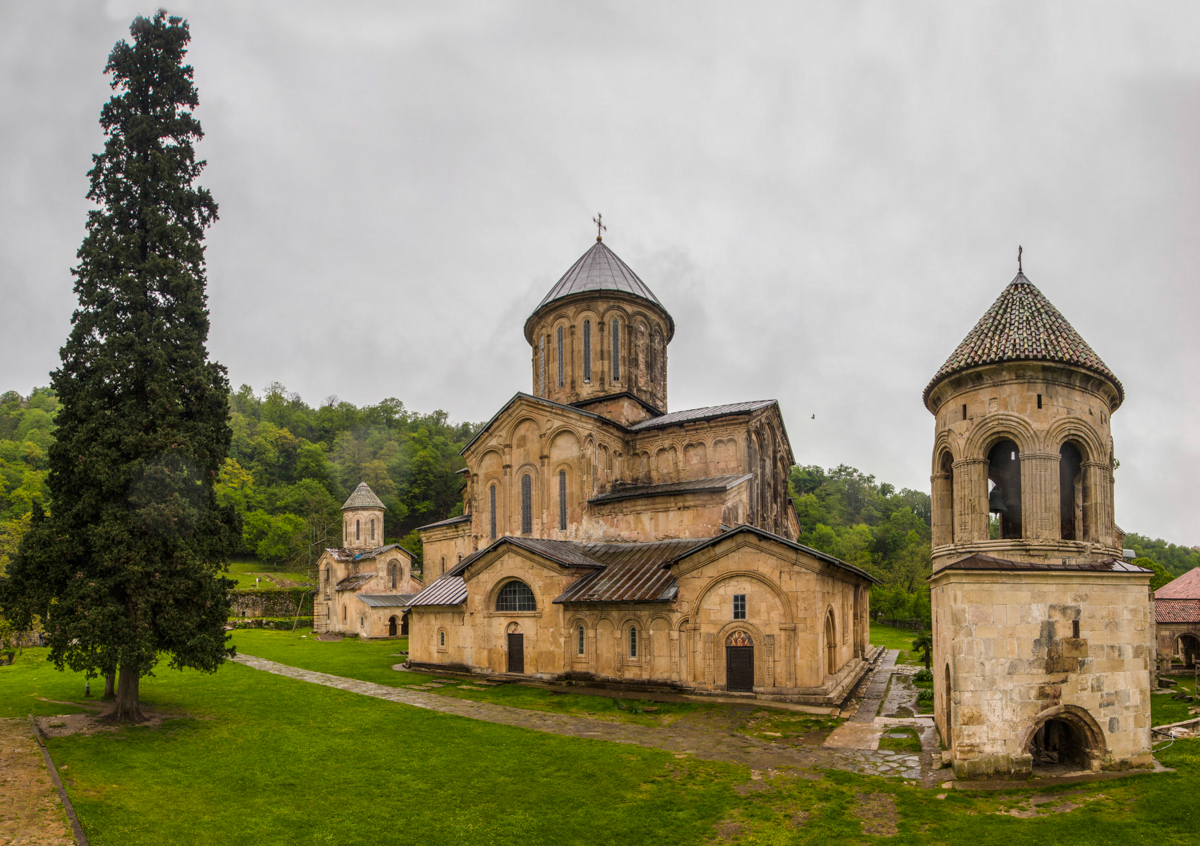
The Gelati Monastery, a UNESCO World Heritage Site, is a presumptive burial place of Queen Tamar.

Tamar outlived her consort, David Soslan, and died of a "devastating disease" not far from her capital Tbilisi, having previously crowned her son, Lasha-Giorgi, coregent. Tamar's historian relates that the queen suddenly fell ill when discussing state affairs with her ministers at the Nacharmagevi castle near the town of Gori, an illness her chronicle attributes to the toll years of military campaigns had on her body. She was transported to Tbilisi and later to the nearby castle of Agarani, where Tamar died and was mourned by her subjects. Her remains were transferred to the cathedral of Mtskheta and later to the Gelati Monastery, a family burial ground of the Georgian royal dynasty. The traditional scholarly opinion is that Tamar died in 1213, although there are several indications that she might have died earlier, in 1207 or 1210.

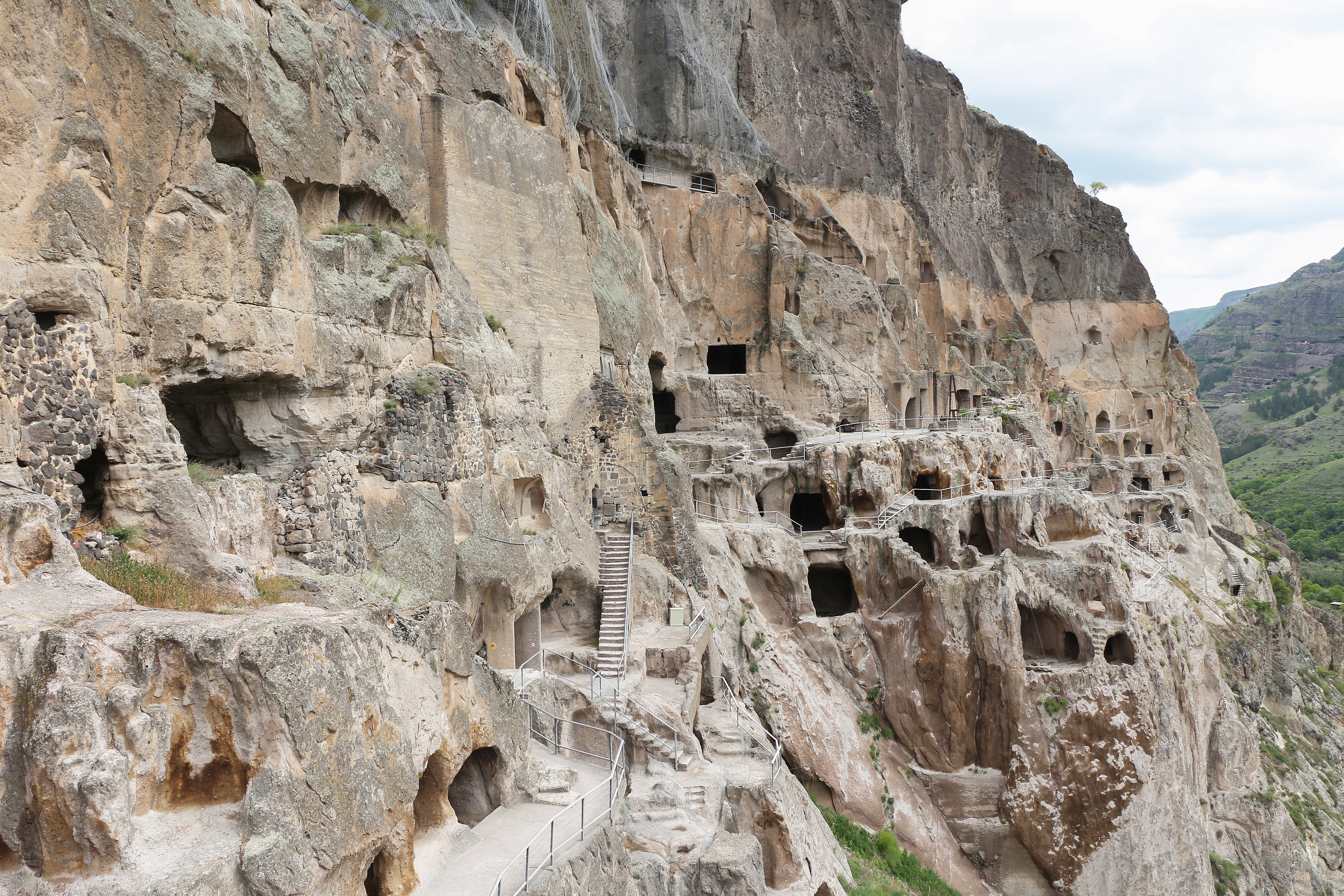
The ruined cave-town of Vardzia.

In later times, a number of legends emerged about Tamar's place of burial. One of them has it that Tamar was buried in a secret niche at the Gelati monastery so as to prevent the grave from being profaned by her enemies. Another version suggests that Tamar's remains were reburied in a remote location, possibly in the Holy Land. The French knight Guillaume de Bois, in a letter dated from the early 13th century, written in Palestine and addressed to the bishop of Besançon, claimed that he had heard that the king of the Georgians was heading towards Jerusalem with a huge army and had already conquered many cities of the Saracens. He was carrying, the report said, the remains of his mother, the "powerful queen Tamar" (regina potentissima Thamar), who had been unable to make a pilgrimage to the Holy Land in her lifetime and had bequeathed her body to be buried near the Holy Sepulchre.

In the 20th century, the quest for Tamar's grave became a subject of scholarly research, as well as the focus of broader public interest. The Georgian writer Grigol Robakidze wrote in his 1918 essay on Tamar: "Thus far, nobody knows where Tamar's grave is. She belongs to everyone and to no one: her grave is in the heart of the Georgian. And in the Georgians' perception, this is not a grave, but a beautiful vase in which an unfading flower, the great Tamar, flourishes." An orthodox academic view still places Tamar's grave at Gelati, but a series of archaeological studies, beginning with Taqaishvili in 1920, has failed to locate it at the monastery.

== Legacy and popular culture ==
=== Medieval ===
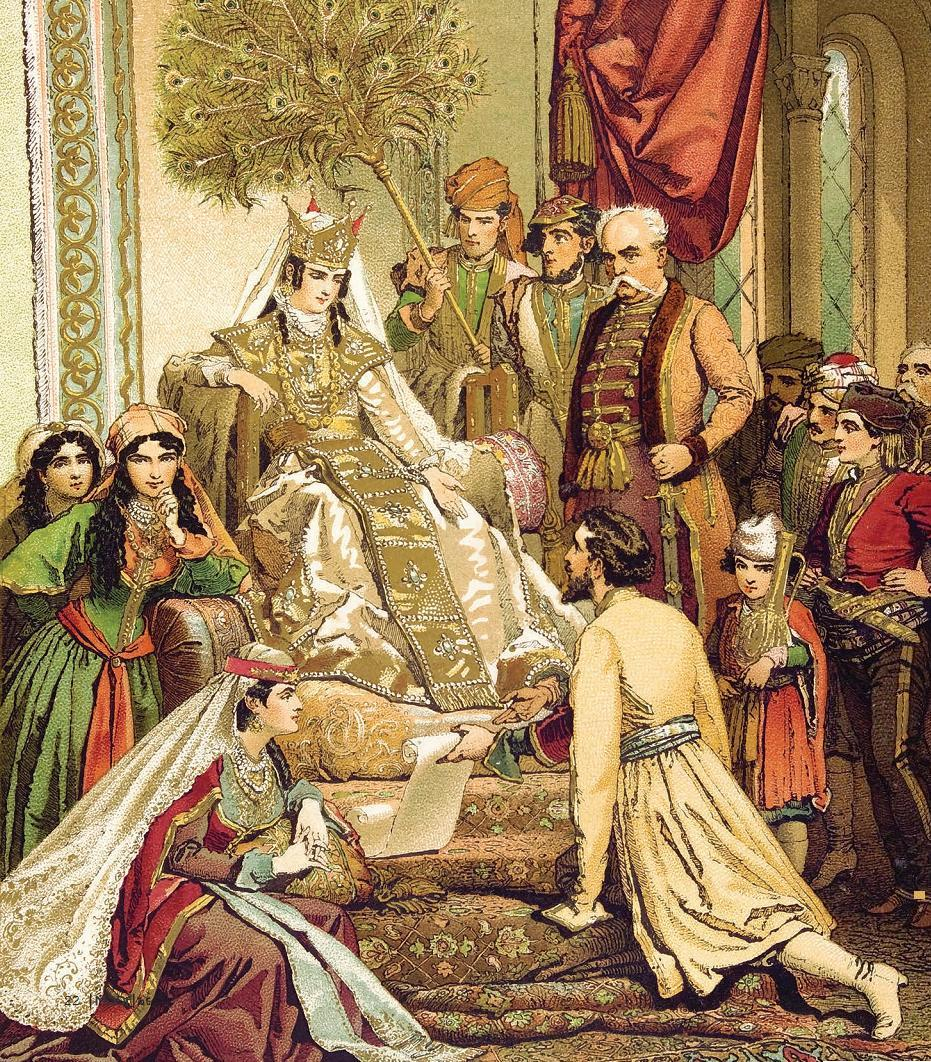
Shota Rustaveli presents his poem to Queen Tamar, a painting by the Hungarian artist Mihály Zichy (1880s).

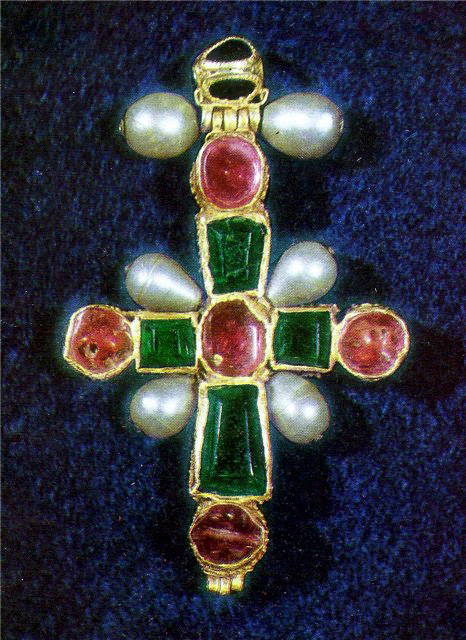
Golden cross of Queen Tamar, composed of rubies, emeralds, and large pearls

Over the centuries, Queen Tamar has emerged as a dominant figure in the Georgian historical pantheon. The construction of her reign as a "Golden age" began in the reign itself and Tamar became the focus of the era. Several medieval Georgian poets, including Shota Rustaveli, claimed Tamar as the inspiration for their works. A legend has it that Rustaveli was even consumed with love for the queen and ended his days in a monastery. A dramatic scene from Rustaveli's poem where the seasoned King Rostevan crowns his daughter Tinatin is an allegory to George III's co-option of Tamar. Rustaveli comments on this: "A lion cub is just as good, be it female or male".

The queen became a subject of several contemporary panegyrics, such as Chakhrukhadze's Tamariani and Ioane Shavteli's Abdul-Mesia. She was eulogized in the chronicles, most notably in the two accounts centered on her reign – The Life of Tamar, Queen of Queens and The Histories and Eulogies of the Sovereigns – which became the primary sources of Tamar's sanctification in Georgian literature. The chroniclers exalt her as a "protector of the widowed" and "the thrice blessed", and place a particular emphasis on Tamar's virtues as a woman: beauty, humility, love of mercy, fidelity, and purity. Although Tamar was canonized by the Georgian church much later, she was even named as a saint in her lifetime in a bilingual Greco-Georgian colophon attached to the manuscript of the Vani Gospels.

The idealization of Tamar was further accentuated by the events that took place under her immediate successors; within two decades of Tamar's death, the Khwarezmian and Mongol invasions brought Georgian ascendancy to an abrupt end. Later periods of national revival were too ephemeral to match the achievements of Tamar's reign. All of these contributed to the cult of Tamar which blurred the distinction between the idealized queen and the real personality.

In popular memory, Tamar's image has acquired a legendary and romantic façade. A diverse set of folk songs, poems and tales illustrate her as an ideal ruler, a holy woman onto whom certain attributes of pagan deities and Christian saints were sometimes projected. For example, in an old Ossetian legend, Queen Tamar conceives her son through a sunbeam which shines through the window. Another myth, from the Georgian mountains, equates Tamar with the pagan deity of weather, Pirimze, who controls winter. Similarly, in the highland district of Pshavi, Tamar's image fused with a pagan goddess of healing and female fertility.

While Tamar occasionally accompanied her army and is described as planning some campaigns, she was never directly involved in the fighting. Yet, the memory of the military victories of her reign contributed to Tamar's other popular image, that of a model warrior-queen. It also echoed in the Tale of Queen Dinara, a popular 16th-century Russian story about a fictional Georgian queen fighting against the Persians. Russian tsar Ivan the Terrible, before the seizure of Kazan, encouraged his army by invoking the examples of Tamar's battles, describing her as "the wisest Queen of Iberia, endowed with the intelligence and courage of a man".

=== Modern ===
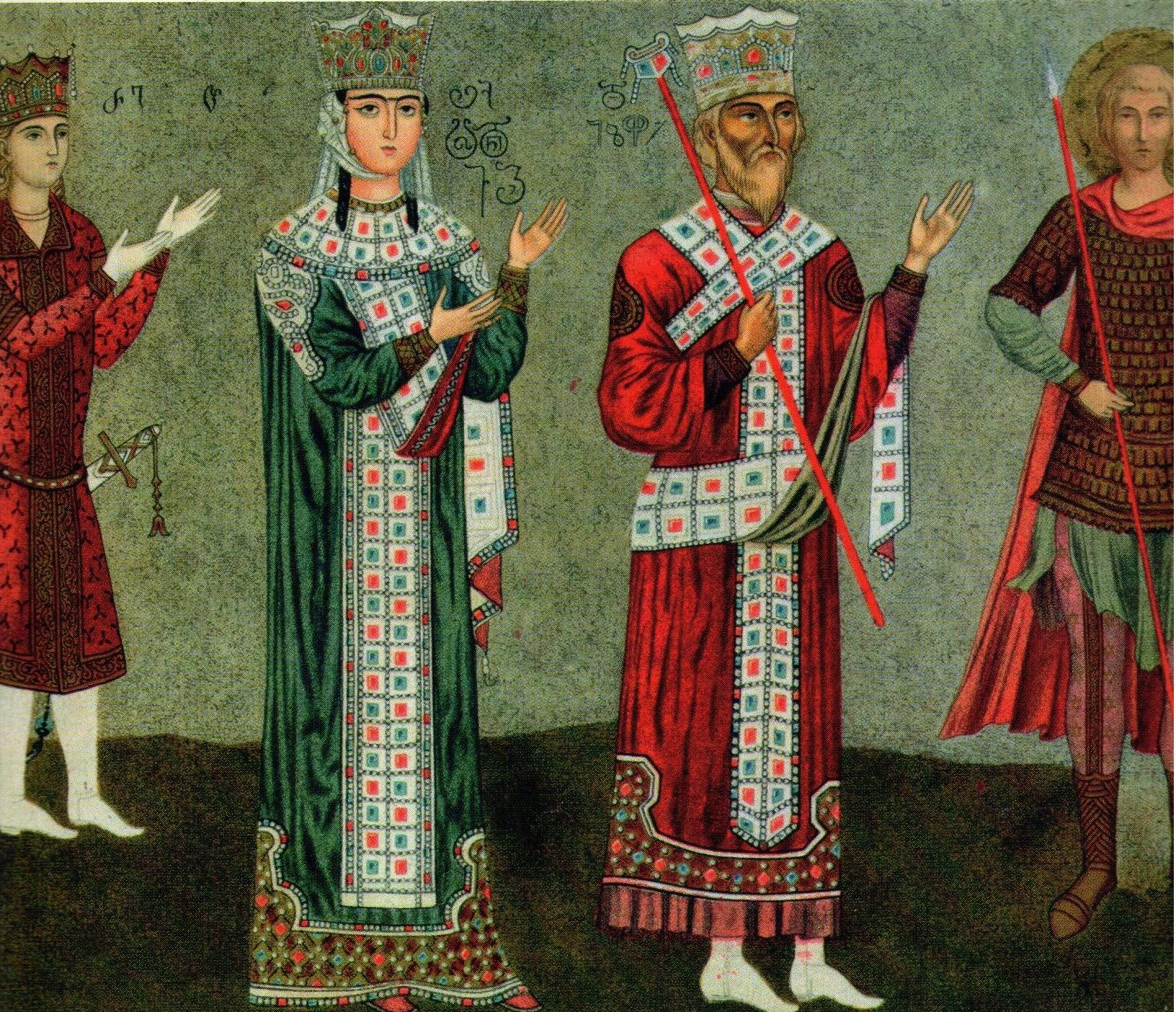
Prince Gagarin's reproduction of the royal panel at Betania, depicting George IV (left), Tamar (center), and George III (right), flanked by the warrior saints (1847).

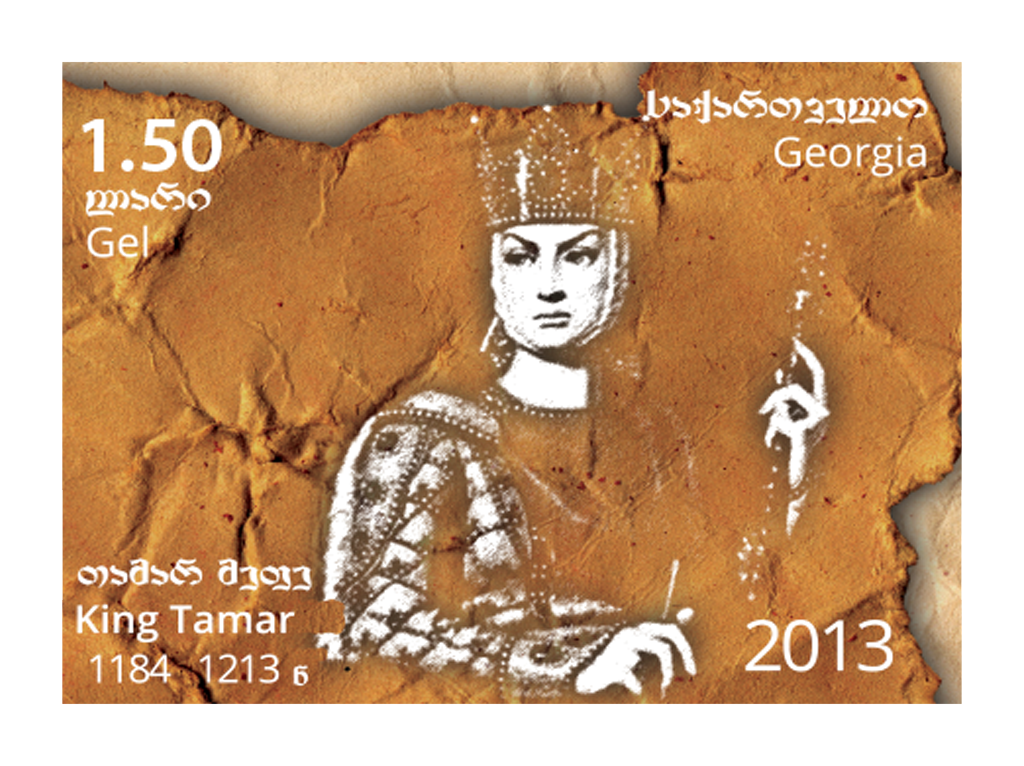
Queen Tamar on the 2013 Georgian postage stamp.

Much of the modern perception of Queen Tamar was shaped under the influence of 19th-century Romanticism and growing nationalism among Georgian intellectuals of that time. In Russian and Western literature of the 19th century, Georgia was perceived as having "oriental tendencies", thus the image of Queen Tamar reflected some of these Western conceptions of the Orient and the characteristics of women in it. The Tyrolean writer Jakob Philipp Fallmerayer described Tamar as a "Caucasian Semiramis". Fascinated by the "exotic" Caucasus, the Russian poet Mikhail Lermontov wrote the romantic poem Tamara (Russian: Тамара; 1841) in which he utilized the old Georgian legend about a siren-like mountainous princess whom the poet gave the name of Queen Tamar. Although Lermontov's depiction of the Georgian queen as a destructive seductress had no apparent historical background, it has been influential enough to raise the issue of Tamar's sexuality, a question that was given some prominence by the 19th-century European authors. Knut Hamsun's 1903 play Queen Tamara was less successful; the theatre critics saw in it "a modern woman dressed in a medieval costume" and read the play as "a commentary on the new woman of the 1890s." Russian conductor Mily Balakirev composed a symphonic poem named "Tamara".

In Georgian literature, Tamar was also romanticized, but very differently from the Russian and Western European view. The Georgian romanticists followed a medieval tradition in Tamar's portrayal as a gentle, saintly woman who ruled a country permanently at war. This sentiment was further inspired by the rediscovery of a contemporary, 13th-century wall painting of Tamar in the then-ruined Betania Monastery, which was uncovered and restored by Prince Grigory Gagarin in the 1840s. The fresco became a source of numerous engravings circulating in Georgia at that time and inspired the poet Grigol Orbeliani to dedicate a romantic poem to it. Furthermore, the Georgian literati, reacting to Russian rule in Georgia and the suppression of national institutions, contrasted Tamar's era to their contemporary situation, lamenting the irretrievably lost past in their writings. Hence, Tamar became a personification of the heyday of Georgia, a perception that has persisted down to the present time.

During World War II, three battalions of the collaborationist Georgian Legion were named after Tamar.

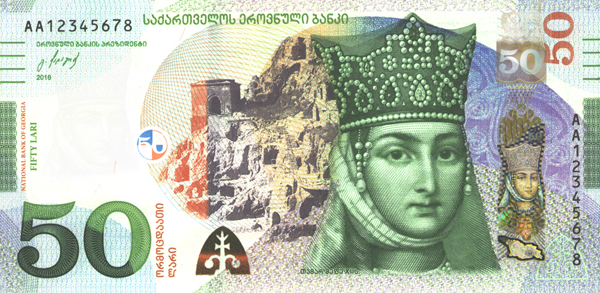
Modern 50 lari banknote depicting Tamar.

Tamar's marriage to the prince Yury of the Grand Principality of Vladimir has become a subject of two resonant prose works in modern Georgia. Shalva Dadiani's play, originally entitled The Unfortunate Russian (უბედური რუსი; 1916–1926), was attacked by Soviet critics for distorting the "centuries-long friendship of the Russian and Georgian peoples." Under Communist Party pressure, Dadiani had to revise both the title and plot in accordance with the official ideology of the Soviet state. In 2002, a satirical short story The First Russian (პირველი რუსი) penned by the young Georgian writer Lasha Bughadze and focused on a frustrated wedding night of Tamar and Yury outraged many conservatives and triggered a nationwide controversy, including heated discussions in the media, the Parliament of Georgia and the Patriarchate of the Georgian Orthodox Church. In 2018, a Georgian court banned the sale of condoms from the company Aiisa, which depicted Tamar.

She is a playable leader of Georgia in the 4X video game Civilization VI, in the Rise and Fall expansion. She also has a dedicated campaign in Age of Empires II introduced with the Mountain Royals expansion.

=== Veneration ===
Saint Tamar
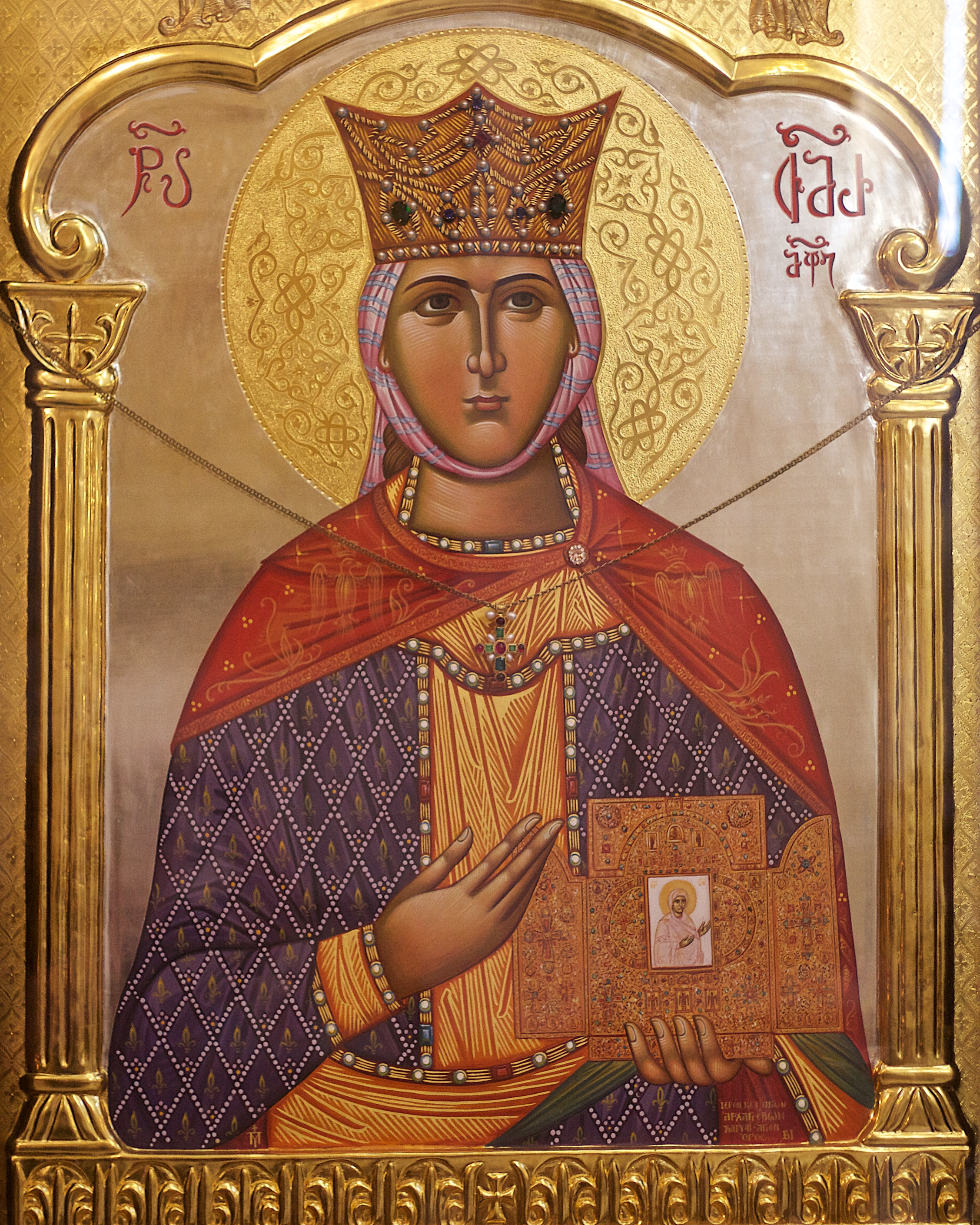
- Icon of Tamar

Right-Believing
- Born: c. 1160
- Died: 18 January 1213
- Venerated in: Eastern Orthodox Church
- Feast: 14 May

Tamar has been canonized by the Georgian Orthodox Church as the Holy Righteous Queen Tamar (წმიდა კეთილმსახური მეფე თამარი, ts'mida k'etilmsakhuri mepe tamari; also venerated as "Right-believing Tamara"), with her feast day commemorated on 1 May (of the Julian Calendar, which equates to 14 May on the Gregorian Calendar) and on Sunday of the Holy Myrrh-Bearing Women. The Antiochian Orthodox observe the feast of St Tamara on 22 April.

== Genealogy ==
The chart below shows the abbreviated genealogy of Tamar and her family, tracing it from Tamar's grandfather to her grandchildren.

Genealogy of Tamar and her family

Demetrius I King of Georgia, 1125–1154
David V King of Georgia, 1154–1155	George III; King of Georgia, 1155–1184	Burdukhan of Alania	Rusudan
Demna	1. Yury Bogolyubsky	Tamar; Queen of Georgia, 1184–1213	2. David Soslan	Rusudan	Manuel Komnenos
George IV; King of Georgia, 1213–1223	Rusudan; Queen of Georgia, 1223–1245	Ghias ad-din	Alexios I Megas Komnenos emperor of Trebizond
David VII; King of Georgia, 1247–1270	David VI; King of Georgia, 1245–1293	Tamar

== See also ==
- Order of Queen Tamara (disambiguation)
- Dinar of Hereti
- Olga of Kiev

== Footnotes ==
Tamar of Georgia Bagrationi dynasty
Regnal titles
Preceded by George III	Queen of Georgia; 1178–1213 with George III (1178–1184); George IV (1207–1213)	Succeeded by George IV
