= Pkhovi =

- Historical region
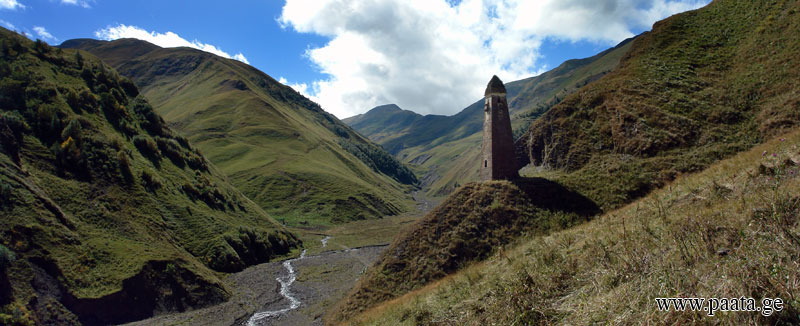
- A Pkhovian landscape with the Lebaiskari tower.

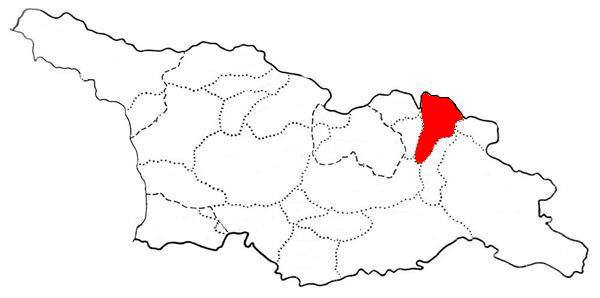
- Map highlighting the historical region of Pkhovi
- Coordinates: 42°30′N 45°00′E
- Country: Georgia
- Mkhare: Mtskheta-Mtianeti

Pkhovi (Georgian: ფხოვი), also known as Pkhoeti (ფხოეთი), is a medieval term for the mountainous district in northeast Georgia comprising the latter-day provinces of Pshavi and Khevsureti along the upper reaches of the Aragvi, and in three alpine valleys just north of the main crest of the Greater Caucasus. Today it is territory of Dusheti Municipality, Mtskheta-Mtianeti region.

== History ==
Inhabitants of Pkhovi – the Pkhovians (ფხო[ვ]ელნი, Pkho[v]elni) – were a tribe of Georgian highlanders known for their warlike character and frequent disobedience to the royal authority.

The toponym Pkhovi, which may derive from a Georgian root meaning "brave, valiant", is first attested in a passage from the seventh-century chronicle The Conversion of Kartli which refers to the defiance of local highlanders to Christianizing efforts of the king Mirian III, and St. Nino, a 4th-century apostle of eastern Georgia (Kartli/Iberia). These pressures are reported to have forced several Pkhovian families to move southeast to Tusheti.

Although the population of this region was nominally under the direct rule of the Georgian crown, they had never been completely integrated into the feudal system of medieval Georgia, and remained relatively little affected by implantation of aristocratic landowners as well as foreign intrusions. However, as Professor Kevin Tuite of Université de Montréal has recently suggested,

[The Pkhovian highlanders] adopted the principal concepts, and vocabulary, of Georgian feudalism. Rather than being instantiated on the ground, however, the principles of hierarchy, interdependence between lord and vassal, land tenure, military and labour tribute, etc., were projected onto the cosmological plane, and superimposed upon beliefs inherited from the common Georgian (or possibly pan-Caucasian) religious system.

— Tuite 2002, 2004.

The position of the Georgian Orthodox Church was also weak, and the Pkhovians professed a curious mixture of pagan and Christian beliefs. This has reflected in the religious architecture of Pkhovi: whereas each village of other highland provinces of Georgia, such as Svaneti, Khevi, Mtiuleti, and Racha, has at least one church dating from the 5th to the 18th century, Pkhovi appears to be devoid of Georgian Orthodox churches. Instead, the region abounds in sacred sites, of which the most venerated are referred to as khati or jvari, meaning "an icon" and "a cross" in standard Georgian usage, but denoting, beyond these sacred images, the sanctuaries in which they are housed, and the deity believed to preside over the sanctuary in Pkhovi.

The refractory independence of Pkhovi's mountainous clans led to the sporadic incursions of royal troops bent on forcing them into submission. One of the most devastating expeditions against the Pkhovians was organized, c.1212, at the behest of Queen Tamar I who presided over the Golden Age of the Kingdom of Georgia. The contemporary chronicle recounts a bloody three-month campaign of pacification by Tamar's general Ivane the atabek, that left several Pkhovian villages and shrines destroyed.

The term Pkhovi disappeared in the 15th century and was replaced with the toponyms: Pshavi and Khevsureti. It has survived, however, in the name of the village Shuapkho (shua- meaning "middle" in Georgian), and the Vainakh designation for the Khevsurs – Pkhia (Пхий).

== See also ==
- Khevsureti
