= Vani Gospels =

Georgian illuminated manuscript of the Gospels

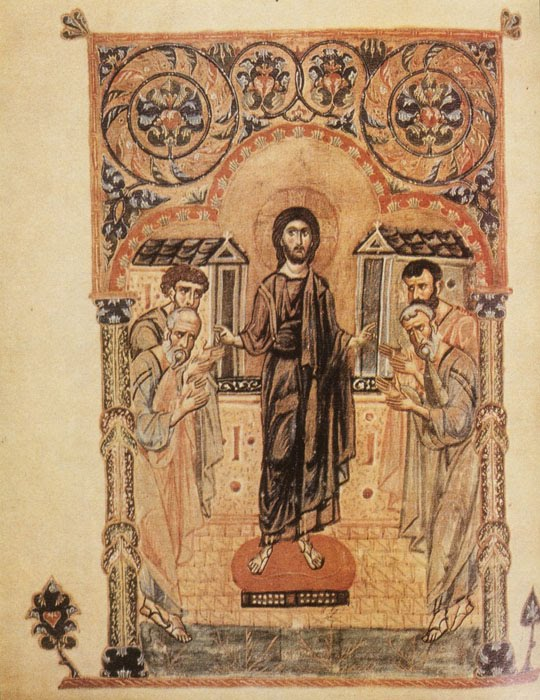
Jesus and the Four Evangelists from the Vani Gospels

The Vani Gospels (Vani Four Gospels; Georgian: ვანის ოთხთავი, Vanis otkhtavi) is an illuminated manuscript of the Four Gospels in the Georgian nuskhuri script dating from the end of the 12th–early 13th centuries. The manuscript was composed at the queen Tamar of Georgia's request by the Georgian monk John the Unworthy at the Rhomana Monastery at Constantinople. It was later brought to Georgia and kept first at the Shorata Monastery (Meskheti), then in Vani (Imereti; hence comes its name) and eventually at the Gelati Monastery at Kutaisi.

The manuscript consists of 274 folios each of 29X21 cm in size and is abundantly illuminated. It is now at the Georgian National Center of Manuscripts in Tbilisi, Georgia (A-1335).
