= Qutlu Arslan =

Qutlu Arslan (Georgian: ყუთლუ არსლანი) was the 12th-century Georgian politician sometimes referred to as the Georgian Simon de Montfort for his rebellion, in circa 1184, against the unlimited royal power.

A Georgianized Kipchak ("naq'ivchaghari", i.e. ex-Kipchak), his ancestry traced to those Turkic tribesmen from the North Caucasus steppes who had been settled in Georgia under King David IV (1089–1125). In sharp contrast to old, frequently rebellious Georgian feudal lords, Qutlu Arslan represented ennobled commoners and military servicemen, who gained distinction through their loyalty to the Georgian King George III (1156–1184) whom Qutlu served as a vizier and mechurchletukhutsesi (treasurer), a post he held upon Queen Tamar's ascend to the throne in 1184. Around the same year, he led a party of nobles and citizens who proposed an idea of limiting the royal power by a parliamentary-type legislature which, in the view of Qutlu Arslan and his followers, would be consist of two chambers: Darbazi (literally, a "hall") or an assembly that would meet occasionally to follow the developments in the kingdom, and Karavi (literally, a "camp"), a legislature in permanent sessions. The dispute between the "party of Karavi" and that of the unlimited royal power concluded with the arrest of Qutlu Arslan. In retaliation, the latter's supporters rose in rebellion, and marched to the Queen's palace. Tamar agreed to release the oppositionist leader, but his ideas were never materialised.

== See also ==
- History of Georgia
- Kipchaks in Georgia
- Parliament of Georgia
