= Rusudan (daughter of George III of Georgia) =

Rusudan (Georgian: რუსუდანი; Greek: Ρουσουδάν) was the younger daughter of King George III of Georgia and of his wife, Burdukhan (Gurandukht). Her elder sister was the famous Queen Tamar, who succeeded their father as ruler of Georgia.

Born after 1160, Rusudan was married, possibly in 1180, to Manuel Komnenos, the eldest son of Andronikos I, who was the Byzantine Emperor from 1183 to 1185. Manuel and Rusudan had two sons, Alexios, probably born in 1182, and David, born around 1184.

When Andronikos was deposed and killed, Manuel was blinded, and possibly may have died from his wounds. It is said that Rusudan fled Constantinople with her sons, taking refuge in Georgia.

While the Fourth Crusade were camped outside Constantinople between 1203 and 1204 (and would later take the city), Tamar sent Georgian troops to help Alexios and David to take control of Trebizond in April 1204. Combined with their additional conquests this became the new Empire of Trebizond.

== Bibliography ==
- C. Toumanoff, "On the relationship between the founder of the Empire of Trebizond and the Georgian Queen Thamar" in Speculum vol. 15 (1940) pp. 299–312.
- Varzos, Konstantinos (1984). Η Γενεαλογία των Κομνηνών [The Genealogy of the Komnenoi] (PDF) (in Greek). Vol. B. Thessaloniki: Centre for Byzantine Studies, University of Thessaloniki. p. 515 note 24.
