= Pshavi =

Coordinates: 42°17′N 44°45′E

Pshavi ფშავი
- Map highlighting the historical region of Pshavi in Georgia
- Country: Georgia
- Mkhare: Mtskheta-Mtianeti
- Capital: Shuapkho, Magaroskari

Area
  - Total: 340 km^{2} (130 sq mi)

Pshavi (Georgian: ფშავი) is a small historic region of northern Georgia, nowadays part of the Mtskheta-Mtianeti mkhare ("region"), and lying chiefly among the southern foothills of the Greater Caucasus mountains along the Pshavis Aragvi River and the upper reaches of the Iori River in the neighbouring region of Tianeti to the south-east.

== Geography ==
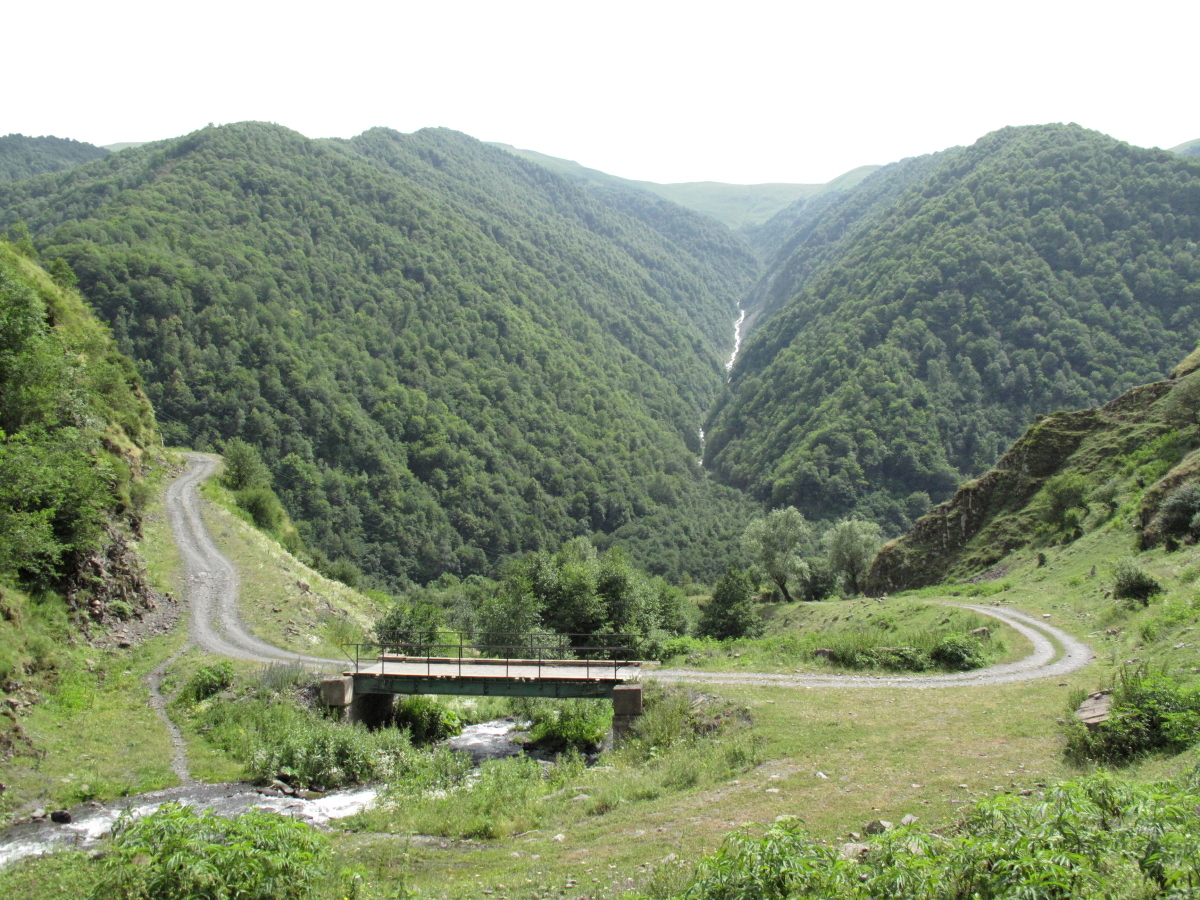
The Tsikhetgora Bridge in Pshavi "proper", just east of the village of Shuapkho

Pshavi borders upon Khevsureti to the north (the two regions were historically grouped together under the name of Pkhovi); the western fringe of Tusheti and the northernmost tip of the Pankisi Gorge to the east; the Iori Valley and Tianeti to the south-east; the Zhinvali Reservoir and the Georgian Military Road to the south and south-west; and south-eastern Mtiuleti and Gudamakari to the west.

The region can be divided into three main parts (valley systems):

1. a historical "heartland" of c.10 villages in Pshavi "proper", which stretches east from the confluence of the Pshavis Aragvi and Khevsuretis Aragvi rivers (42°25'32.87"N, 44°56'35.46"E) to the village of Ukanapshavi (42°24'25.11"N, 45°09'55.52"E), centred upon the village of Shuapkho.
2. the c.30 villages of "Lower Pshavi" (main village: Magharoskari), which stretches south along the banks of the Pshavis Aragvi river from its confluence with the Khevsuretis Aragvi down to the shores of the Zhinvali Reservoir (42°09'01.53"N, 44°46'29.21"E), and which includes the Chargali, Sharakhevi and Sondiskhevi valleys as well as numerous other small side-valleys.
3. a half-dozen villages along the upper reaches of the Iori River Valley, which flows south into Tianeti.

== Protected Landscape status ==
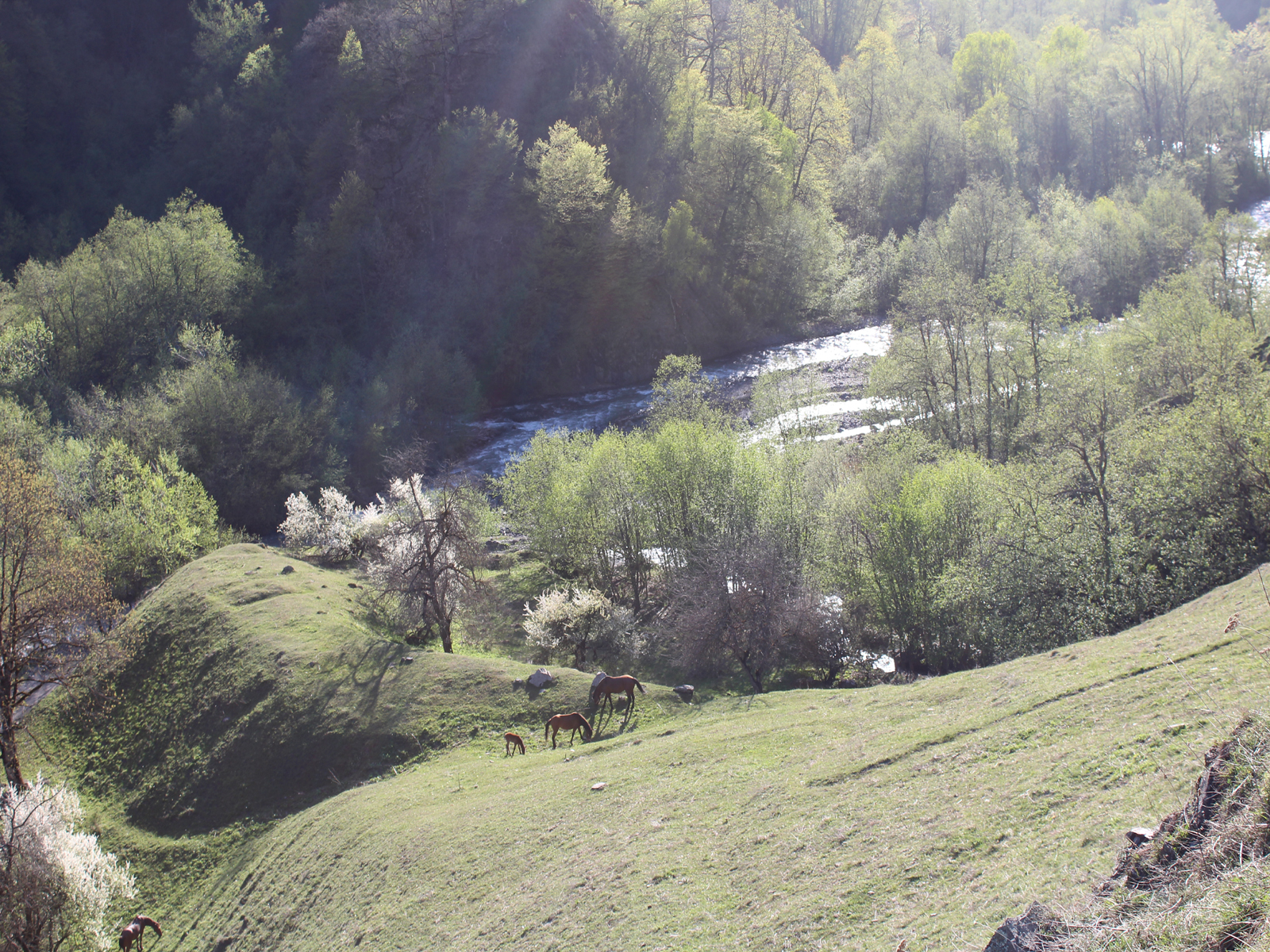
The Pshavis Aragvi river, located within the Pshav-Khevsureti National Park, Mtskheta-Mtianeti region, Georgia by Miho Mosulishvili, 2018

In 2016, the Georgian government began investigating the possibility of officially granting the historical region of Pshavi "Protected Landscape" status, which would support conservation efforts while allowing the sustainable use of natural resources and the development of eco-tourism.

== Population ==
Like many other regions of the world, particularly mountainous ones, the population of Pshavi has dropped significantly as a result of a process of rural exodus which began in the nineteenth century; many former villages nowadays consist of no more than a few houses. An early twentieth-century census of Pshavi counted 210 households in Pshavi "proper" and 368 in Lower Pshavi.

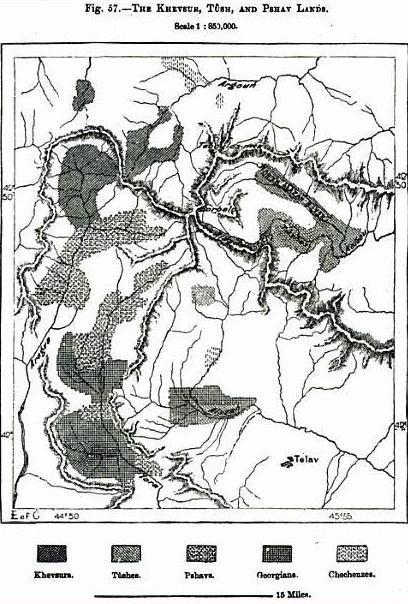
A map of the "Khevsur, Tush and Pshav lands" from Élisée Reclus' The Earth and Its Inhabitants

== People ==
The Pshav poet Vazha-Pshavela and his family (around 1905).

The Pshavs (Georgian: ფშაველი, pshaveli, pl. Georgian: ფშავლები, pshavlebi) speak a dialect of Georgian close to that spoken by their neighbours, the Khevsurs.

Nominally Georgian Orthodox, the Pshavs have, however, like other mountain tribes preserved some of their pre-Christian beliefs, which a handful of people continue to profess in a syncretic form at the region's numerous shrines. Their history, traditions and customs are also similar to those of their eastern Georgian neighbours.

The popular Georgian poet Luka Razikashvili (1861-1915), best known by his pen name "Vazha-Pshavela" ("a lad from Pshavi"), was born in the village of Chargali, where his home has been turned into a "house museum".

== See also ==
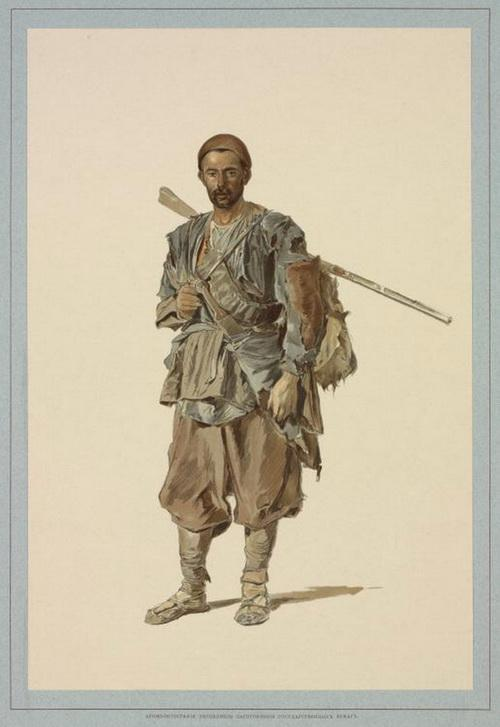
"A Pshav man", by Theodor Horschelt. From the album published in St. Petersburg in 1896

- Pkhovi
