= Michael IV of Georgia =

Catholicos Patriarch of Georgia, 1178 to 1184

Michael IV (Georgian: მიქელ IV) or Mikel Mirianisdze was Catholicos-Patriarch of All Georgia, from 1178 to 1184, Mtsignobartukhutses-Chkondideli (chancellor) since 1184. Michael held his high offices to the end of his life.

Archbishop of Samtvisi Michael was loyal to King George III. After the resignation of Nikoloz I Gulaberisdze he was appointed as Catholicos-Patriarch of All Georgia. Following the death of George III the question of the legality of Queen Tamar's status was raised by the great feudal lords, but with the vigorous support of the patriarch Michael IV the question was settled in Tamar's favour. Tamar had to reward the Catholicos-Patriarch Michael's support by making him a chancellor, thus placing him at the top of both the clerical and secular hierarchies. The queen fully appreciated the negative effects of this act and endeavoured to remedy the situation. But it was extremely difficult to fight Mikel Mirianisdze. His high offices, particularly the office of head of the Georgian Church, made him a dangerous adversary, and the queen prepared for the struggle painstakingly, with caution. Tamar failed in her attempt to use a church synod to dismiss the Catholicos-Patriarch Michael. Michael held his high offices to the end of his life. Subsequently, in order to accentuate his scorn for Michael, the chronicler wrote, reporting Michael's death: "Michael Mirianisdze, Patriarch, Chkondidel-mtsignobartukhutsesi", died and nobody mourned his death".

== Bibliography ==
- Lordkipanidze, Mariam Davydovna; Hewitt, George B. (1987). Georgia in the XI–XII Centuries. Tbilisi: Ganatleba Publishers.
- Suny, Ronald Grigor (1994) [1988]. The Making of the Georgian Nation (2nd ed.). Bloomington and Indianapolis: Indiana University Press. ISBN 0-253-20915-3.
