= Mechurchletukhutsesi =

Mechurchletukhutsesi (Georgian: მეჭურჭლეთუხუცესი) was the office of royal treasurer in the Medieval Georgia. The Royal Court Regulations described his position as exclusive: he dealt with customs, income tax, tax on merchants, the supply of money, gems and metal, as well as silver plate, dinner services and valuable fats used for lighting; he watched over city mayors and their expenditure.

== See also ==
- Court officials of the Kingdom of Georgia
