= Georgian feudalism =

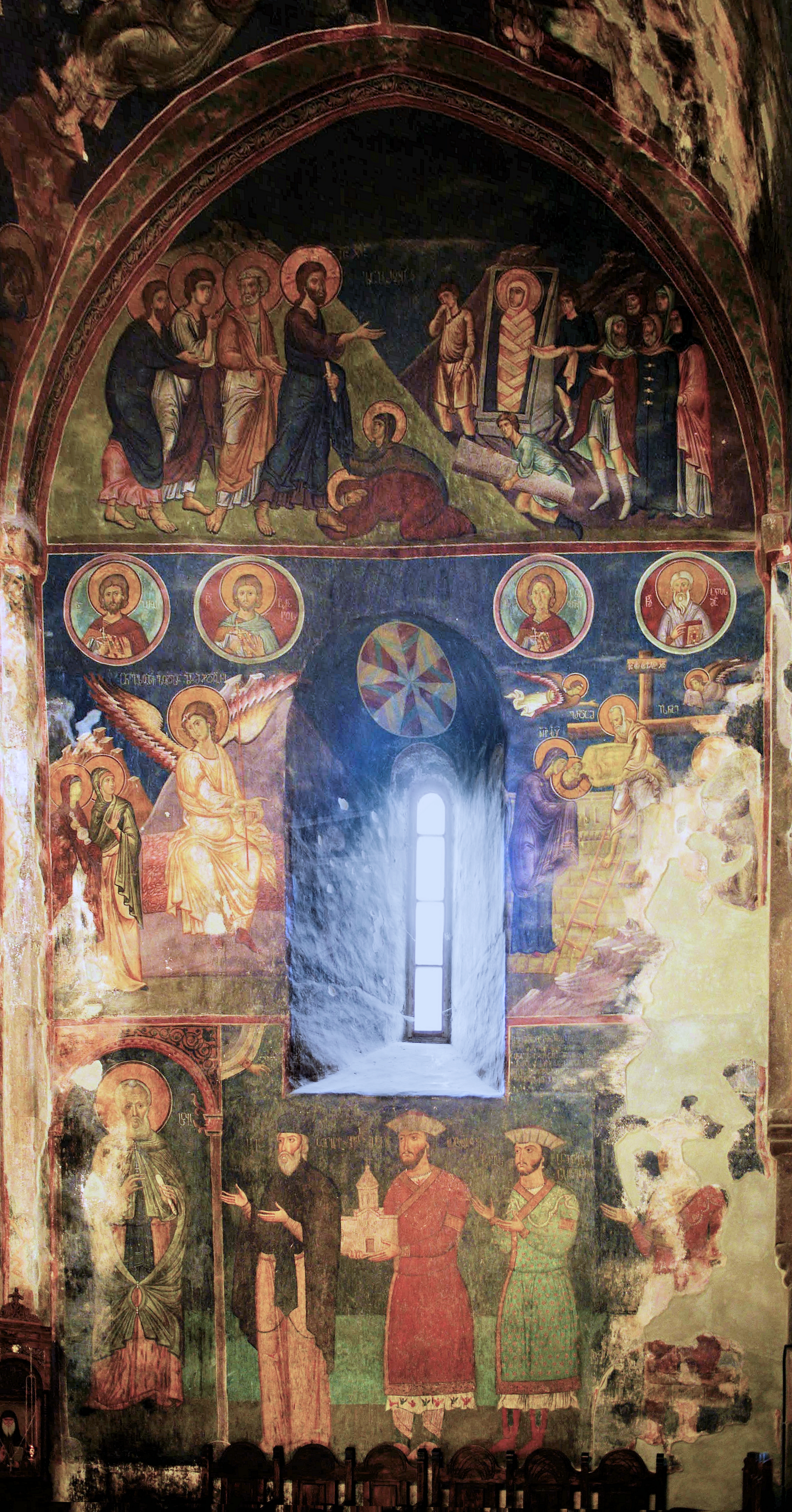
A fresco from Sapara Monastery, commemorating the Georgian feudal lords from the Jaqeli family, who were patrons of the monastic complex in the Middle Ages.

Georgian feudalism (Georgian: პატრონყმობა, romanized: p'at'ronq'moba; from p'at'roni, "lord", "master", and q'moba, "slavery", "serfdom"), was a system of personal dependence or vassalage that flourished during the Middle Ages in the Kingdom of Georgia and its successor Georgian states. It most closely resembled feudal systems found in Western Europe.

== Etymology ==
The Georgian term for feudalism, patronqmoba, is derived from Latin patronus and Georgian qma, which has variously been translated as vassal or serf.

== Early period ==
In the medieval period, Georgian feudalism went through three distinct phases. In the first period, taken to have lasted from the 8th to the 11th centuries, Georgian society was organized as a network of personal ties, tying the king with the nobles of various classes. By the early 9th century, Georgia had already developed a system in which homage was exchanged for benefices.

== High point ==
The second period began in the 11th century and was a high point of Georgian feudalism. This system was characterized by officially decreed relationship between personal ties and the possession of a territory whereby some lands were given for life (sakargavi), other in relationship between personal ties and the occupation of a territory (mamuli). The latter gradually replaced the former and land gradually changed from conditional to hereditary tenure, a process completed only at the end of the 15th century. Yet, a hereditary transmission of a holding remained dependent on the vassal's relationship with his lord.

This was also the Age of Chivalry immortalized in the medieval Georgian epics, most significantly in Shota Rustaveli's The Knight in the Panther's Skin. The aristocratic élite of this period was divided into two major classes: an upper noble whose dynastic dignity and feudal quality was expressed in the terms tavadi and didebuli, respectively; both of these terms were synonymous, from the 11th to the 14th centuries, with eristavi, and all three terms referred to one of the upper nobles, "a prince". Lesser nobles, the aznauri, were either "nobles of race" (mamaseulni or natesavit aznaurni) or "of patent" (aghzeebulni aznaurni) who acquired their status in specific charters issued by the king or a lord. The power of the feudal nobles over the peasantry also increased and the cultivators began to loss a degree of personal freedom they had formerly enjoyed. According to one contemporary law, a lord could search out and return a runaway peasant for up to thirty years after his flight. Thus, in this period, the Georgian patronqmoba essentially acquired the form of typical serfdom.

== Downfall ==
The Mongol domination in the 13th century dealt a blow not only to Georgia’s prosperity and regional hegemony, but shuttered its social system. After a brief revival of the 14th century, a long twilight ensued. A gradual process of disintegration of the Georgian feudal system set in the 15th century, and became more prominent in the 16th and 17th. The vassal relations were frequently found to be in question and their legitimacy ceased to constitute the basis of declined royal authority. Now, the rivalry between the royal crown and its vassals changed into a struggle between a weak state and increasingly independent princes. By the 18th century, the Georgian feudal élite had established a new system known as tavadoba, the rule of the princes, in which vassal hierarchy no longer had any substantial force. By virtue of their power and the royal weakness, princes and nobles were able to break with their sovereign and became sovereigns in their own provinces. The dependent nobility, the aznauri, split into three groups: vassals of the king, vassals of the tavadi, and vassals of the catholicoi; they stood between the peasantry and the great nobility. The aznauri were tied more effectively to their overlords than the great princes were to their king.

== Feudal hierarchy ==
This hierarchical division of Georgian feudal society was later codified by King Vakhtang VI (r. 1716–1724) in an official table of "weregild" or blood money rates, which had the force of law.

At the time of the Russian annexation, Georgian society was rigidly hierarchical. A comparatively large proportion, 5% of the population, belonged to the nobility. The highest circles of society were the members of the royal Bagrationi family. Immediately below them came the princes, the tavadi. In Kingdom of Kartli, the most prestigious princes were the heads of the five "most noble" clans—the Orbeliani, Amilakhvari, Tsitsishvili, and the two Eristavi clans—and the melik of Somkhiti. Members of these clans outranked other noble clans. Below the princes were the untitled nobility, aznauri, consisting of the takhtis aznauri, dependent on the king, and mtsire aznauri, dependent on the princes, tahhtis aznauri, and the Church. Royal vassals, like the mouravi, outranked the vassals of the church, who in turn outranked the vassals of nobles. Many aznauri were quite poor and lived no better than peasants, but their status carried certain privileges and exemptions from obligations. Before the Russian annexation in the 1800s, the Georgian princes not only enjoyed nearly unlimited power over their estates and the enserfed peasantry but exercised police and judicial power. The highest official appointed by the king to govern the towns and countryside, the mouravi, was almost always a noble from the upper ranks and often held the position as a hereditary privilege.

After the Russian annexation of Georgia, the former basis of Georgian society, patronqmoba or lord-vassal relationship, was replaced by the principle of batonqmoba (ბატონყმობა, from batoni, "master", and qmoba), which may best be rendered as "proprietor-serf relationship". The code of Vakhtang survived under the Russian rule into the 1840s, when the feudal system in Georgia was finally organized along the lines of Russian serfdom.

== Glossary ==
- Azati – former serf freed by lord
- Aznauri – Georgian noble
- Aznauroba – nobility
- Batoni – suzerain; seigneur; owner
- Begara – duty, service; for peasants, labor obligation (corvée)
- Bogano – landless peasant
- Deoba – the right of Georgian peasants to petition the king for redness of grievances
- Eristavi - head of the nation
- Ghala – an obligation paid by peasants to lords, usually to 10 to 25 percent of the grain harvest
- Glakhaki – the poor, destitute peasants
- Glekhi – peasant
- Khizani – poor peasant forced from the lands of his lord and obligated to rent land indefinitely from another lord
- Kulukhi – obligation of Georgian peasant to his lord equal to 25 percent of the grape harvest or wine output
- Mamuli – land granted in hereditary tenure
- Mojalabe – a near-slave who lived in the home of his lord and had no land of his own
- Msakhuri – domestic servant; a bodyguard; a serf often raised to vassal gentry
- Mtsire Aznauri - Chevalier, petty noble
- Mtavari - Georgian Duke
- Patroni – lord; master; owner
- Qma – serf;
- Sakhaso – in medieval Georgia, lands held directly by the king; later, lands held in common by an entire noble clan under the rule of the tavadi
- Satavado – landed estate; private property of tavadi
- Tahtis Aznauri - Baron
- Tavadi – high noble, prince
- Tavadoba – in late Georgian feudalism, the rule of princes marked by weak royal power

== See also ==
- Nobility of Georgia
