= Yury Bogolyubsky =

King consort of Georgia c.1185–1188

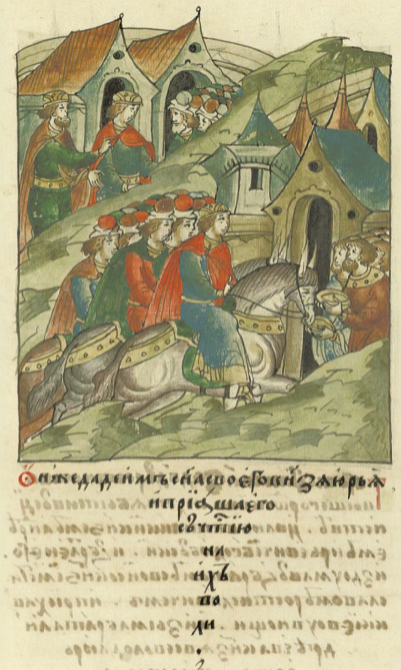
- Yury enters Novgorod. A miniature from the Illustrated Chronicle of Ivan the Terrible

King consort of Georgia
- Tenure: c. 1185 – c. 1188
- Born: 1160
- Died: after 1193
- Spouse: Tamar of Georgia
- House: Yurievichi
- Father: Andrey Bogolyubsky
- Religion: Eastern Orthodox Church

Yury Bogolyubsky (Russian: Юрий Боголюбский), known as Giorgi Rusi (Georgian: გიორგი რუსი, George the Rus') in the Kingdom of Georgia, was a Rus' prince of Novgorod (1172–1175). Born around 1160, he was married to Queen Tamar of Georgia from 1185 until being divorced and exiled in 1188.

== Reign ==
Son of Grand Prince Andrey Bogolyubsky of Vladimir-Suzdal, he ruled Novgorod from 1172 to 1175. He was dethroned and expelled after the murder of his father in 1175. Defeated in a series of internal wars, he finally found a shelter in the Northern Caucasus in the late 1170s. He was found among the Kipchak, with whom he hoped to restore his rights to his father's princedom in 1184–1185.

== Marriage ==
In 1185, Georgian nobles headed by Abulasan, Catholicos Mikel Marianidze and Rusudan, daughter of Demetre I arranged a marriage of Prince Yury with Queen Tamar of Georgia. As her husband, he commanded, in 1186–1187, a Georgian army which successfully raided the Seljuk possessions of Rüm in the west and the Eldiguzids in Arran in the east. However, Tamar soon was disappointed in her husband and divorced him in 1187. Yuri was said to be a heavy drinker, ambitious, involved in sexual misdeeds, torture, bestiality, and sodomy. With the full support of the Georgian nobility and Georgian Orthodox Church Yury and Tamar divorced, and Yury was exiled from Georgia to Constantinople in 1188.

== Revolt ==
Yury allied himself with a powerful party of Georgian nobles led by Vardan Dadiani, Guzan Abulasanisdze and Botso Jaqeli, and returned to lead a revolt against Tamar in 1191. The rebels proclaimed Yury King of Western Georgia in the palace of Geguti and captured several provinces in the south-western Georgia, but were eventually crushed by the Queen's devoted general Gamrekel Toreli at the battles of Tmogvi and Erusheti. The rebels capitulated and Yury was pardoned by Tamar. However, he revolted again in 1193 and invaded Kakheti province. Defeated in the vicinities of Kambechani, he was imprisoned in the Lurji Monastery in Tbilisi. Yury disappeared from history after. His tomb has not been found.

== Legacy and popular culture ==
Tamar's marriage to the Rus prince Yuri became a subject of two resonant prose works in modern Georgia. Shalva Dadiani's play, originally entitled The Unfortunate Russian (უბედური რუსი; 1916–1926), was attacked by the Soviet critics for distorting the "centuries-long friendship of the Russian and Georgian peoples." Under the Communist Party pressure, Dadiani had to revise both the title and the plot to bring it into line of the official ideology. In 2002, a satyrical short-story The First Russian (პირველი რუსი) penned by the young Georgian writer Lasha Bughadze and focused on a frustrated wedding night of Tamar and Yuri outraged many conservatives and triggered a nationwide controversy, including heated discussions in the media, the Parliament of Georgia and the Patriarchate of the Georgian Orthodox Church.

Preceded by Rurik Rostislavich	Prince of Novgorod; 1172–1175	Succeeded by Sviatoslav Mstislavich
