= Tamta Mkhargrdzeli =

Georgian noblewoman (c. 1195–1254)

Tamta Mkhargrdzeli თამთა მხარგრძელი Թամթա Զաքարյան

Ruler of Akhlat
- Reign: 1245–1254
- Born: c. 1195; Court of Tamar of Georgia
- Died: 1254; Ahlat
- Spouse: Al-Awhad; Al-Ashraf; Jalal al-Din
- House: Zakarid dynasty
- Father: Ivane I Zakarian
- Mother: Khoshak

Tamta Mkhargrdzeli or Tamta Zakarian (c. 1195–1254) was an Armenian Chalcedonian Christian noblewoman, born at the court of queen Tamar of Georgia. She appears in only a few written sources, including contemporary histories by Kirakos Gandzaketsi and Vardan Areveltsi.

== Biography ==
=== Early life and family ===
There is no information about the place and date of her birth. Nothing is known about Tamta's mother except the name Khoshak. Tamta probably spent her childhood in the province of Lori, where her father Ivane I Zakarian had large estates. By 1210, Tamta was of marriageable age, meaning she was over 13 years old. Tamta died at an old age in about 1254, which suggests that she was born around 1195. Tamta had a brother Avag.

=== Marriage to Al-Awhad ===
The first time Tamta is mentioned is in connection with the events that led to her first marriage. In 1209/10 or 1210/11 Tamta's father, Ivane besieged Ahlat. The ruler of Ahlat, Al-Awhad at that time together with the brothers Al-Kamil and al-Ashraf, was in Damascus or Egypt. The position of the Armenian-Georgian army was advantageous and they would have taken the city if not for an accident. Historians described the reasons for it in different ways: they blamed a lame horse, carelessness or drunkenness on Ivane, who, “swinging aimlessly,” came too close to the city walls; they praised the townspeople who dug a trap on which the horse had tripped. As a result, Ivane was captured. To liberate Ivane, Zakare had to enter into negotiations; he demanded that his brother not be handed over to the Ayyubids, threatening to ruin the lands of Ahlat. According to the agreement, for the release of Ivane, Zakare and Ivane undertook to return many fortresses to the Ayyubids, release 5,000 Muslim captives, pay a ransom, conclude a truce for 30 years and give Tamta, Ivane's daughter, to al-Awhad as his wife.

=== Marriage to Al-Ashraf ===
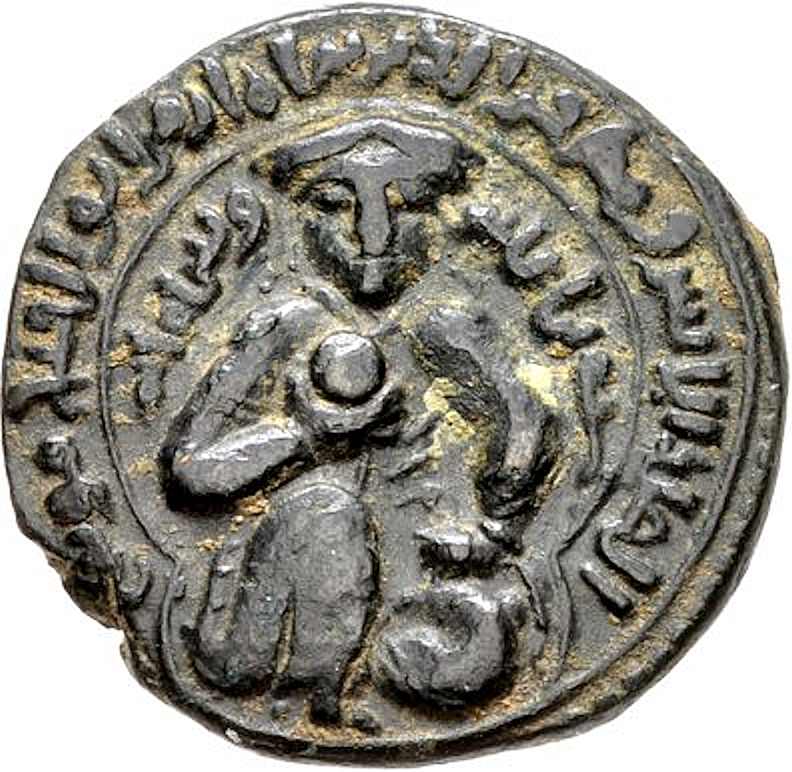
Al-Ashraf in 1215, Mayyafariqin mint.

Al-Ashraf did not send Tamta back to her parental family as a widow, but made her his wife. It is known that by the time al-Ashraf married Tamta, he already had at least one wife. In 1208/09, his wife was Terjan Khatun, the sister of the atabeg of Mosul, Zangid Nur al-Din Arslan Shah. This marriage was arranged by al-Ashraf's father, al-Adil. Perhaps later, in 1219, al-Ashraf married a Seljuk princess, sister of Sultan Kaykaus I and Kayqubad I. Al-Ashraf and Kayqubad entered into marriage alliances. At the same time, it is known for sure that Kayqubad married al-Ashraf's sister, and the reference to “unions” in the plural may mean that al-Ashraf married Kay-Kubad's sister.

The closeness between Tamta and al-Ashraf is questionable, since he spent a long time away from her and may have preferred the love of men, since, as is known, he dedicated poetry to boys. Al-Ashraf had three wives and only one child, a daughter. Although there is a possibility that her mother was Tamta, the girl lived in Damascus and Cairo. Al-Ashraf's first wife, Terjan Khatun, was the patron of two buildings in Damascus. This suggests that she accompanied her husband, unlike Tamta, who most likely remained in Ahlat, although J. Sublet, referring to Sibt Ibn al-Jawzi and Ibn-Wasil, believed that Tamta also until 1245 was in Damascus.

In Tamta's second marriage there were long periods when Tamta lived in Ahlat without her husband. For almost the entire year 1221, he and his brother al-Kamil fought in Egypt against the Crusaders. Perhaps in 1222, when Ahlat was ruled by al-Muzaffar Ghazi, Tamta took part in resolving the conflict between him and the Georgians.

In 1229, after the death of his brother al-Muazzam, al-Ashraf became emir of Damascus, and he had to cede the lands in Jazira to a relative. The only possession he retained from the past was Ahlat, which was cut off from his Syrian lands. Tamta, as a woman, could not be the official ruler or governor of the city, so back in the early 1220s, al-Ashraf appointed his hajib (chamberlain), Husam al-Din Ali, as the Wali of Ahlat. For Tamta to rule successfully, it was necessary to find a way to somehow work with or through the hajib. Tamta could rule independently of her husband, but not do it openly. Perhaps Al-Ashraf believed that her presence and activities would be a deterrent for the hajib.

From September 1226 to June 1227, al-Ashraf was a prisoner of his brother al-Muazzam in Damascus. It was at this time that Jalal ad-Din first arrived at Khlat.

=== Marriage to Jalal al-Din Mangburni ===
In the mid-1200s, another turning point occurred in Tamta's life. In 1225, Jalal al-Din defeated the Georgian army at the Battle of Garni. Kirakos blamed this disaster on Ivan's conversion to the Georgian faith and treason against the Armenian. Vardan Areveltsi also considered religious conflicts as the cause of Ivane's defeat. Between 1225 and 1229, Jalal ad-Din burned Tbilisi twice and captured Dvin. In late 1226, Jalal ad-Din besieged Khlat for the first time. Three times Khwarazmshah tried to capture it, but was not successful until 1230. The sultan had several reasons for attacking Khlat. In addition to the key value of the city's location, Jalal al-Din had personal scores with Hajib Husam al-Din Ali: one of the sultan's wives, a Seljuk princess, secretly escaped and gave Husam al-Din the fortresses and treasury under her control. Jalal al-Din's anger was so great that when negotiating with al-Ashraf, he agreed to a reconciliation on condition of extraditing Husam al-Din. But Husam al-Din died: either he was executed by al-Ashraf or he died himself. Failing to get his enemy, Jalal al-Din began to storm the city. On 14 April 1230, Khlat was captured as a result of the treachery of some of the townspeople. Jalal al-Din did not find the princess in the city, but Tamta was there. According to D'Osson, "Gurjeet (a Georgian woman), wife of Prince Ashraf, was in Helat and became a prisoner of the Sultan, who exercised his rights the same night." Historians have noted that the violence perpetrated on Tamta was the result of Jalal al-Din's desire for revenge against the princess and al-Ashraf. In addition to Tamta, two of al-Ashraf's younger brothers, Ya'qub and Abbas, were captured by Jalal al-Din. Apparently realising the value of Tamta's background, Jalal al-Din did not just spend the night with Tamta but married her. Before leaving Khlat, he repaired the breaches in the walls of the city that had been pierced by catapults during the siege. Nevertheless, when al-Ashraf returned to the city, according to Abu-l-Fida, Khlat was "in ruins and completely abandoned." The marriage of Tamta and Jalal al-Din lasted only four months.

The humiliation of al-Ashraf's violence against his wife, albeit abandoned in a border town, prompted al-Ashraf, according to Nuwayri, to form an alliance with Kayqubad I against Jalal al-Din, who was defeated by them in August 1230 at Yassıçemen and fled.

=== Capture by the Mongols ===
Around 1236 she was captured by the Seljuks and given within a political deal to the Mongols. She subsequently travelled widely with the Mongolian court, including to Mongolia between 1236 and 1245.

== Leadership ==
Although Akhlat was administered by a male Muslim governor on behalf of al-Ashraf, according to the Armenian 13th-century historian Kirakos Gandzaketsi, while she was al-Ashraf's wife Tamta influenced decisions including support for pilgrimage and reducing tax rates. Antony Eastmond suggests that Tamta's status as a Christian helped her to influence the citizens of Akhlat, who remained majority Christian during the Muslim rule.

Mkhargrdzeli is recorded as commanding a fort in 1225 on the modern border of Azerbaijan and Armenia, named `Aliabad. The Mongol ruler Töregene Khatun instated Tamta as a Mongol vassal in Akhlat, and Tamta ruled Akhlat from 1245, when she returned, to 1254, when she died. As the ruler of Akhlat in her own right, Tamta was in the same position as the kings of Georgia, the emperors of Trebizond, the Seljuk sultans of Anatolia and the Lu'lu'id emirs of Mosul.

== Historiography ==
In Tamta's World, Eastmond uses the few sources that reference life within a wide variety of circumstantial evidence for her life. Zaroui Pogossian takes issue with Eastmon's emphasis of the role and influence of men over Mkhargrdzeli's life and argues that female influence on Tamta herself, through her family and the court would have been considerable.

=== Selected publications ===
Sergio La Porta, 'Reconstructing Armenia: Strategies of Co-Existence amongst Christians and Muslims in the Thirteenth Century', in Negotiating Co-Existence: Communities, Cultures and Convivencia in Byzantine Society (2013) gives an account of Tamta's life and family.

Antony Eastmond, Tamta's World (2017) gives a biography of Tamta. The book received an honourable mention at the Association of American Publishers 2018 PROSE Awards.

== Bibliography ==
- Brosset, Marie-Félicité (1851). Additions et éclaircissements à l'Histoire de la Géorgie depuis l'antiquité jusqu'en 1469 de J.-C. The Imperial Academy of Sciences.
- Eastmond, Antony (2017). Tamta's world. Cambridge University Press. ISBN 978-1-107-16756-8.
- Gandzaketsi, Kirakos (1976). ru:История Армении [History of Armenia] (in Russian). Translated by L. A. Khanlaryan. Moscow: Science.
- Manandyan, Yakov Amazaspovich (1952). Քննական Տեսություն Հայ Ժողովրդի Պատմության [Critical Review of the History of the Armenian People] (in Armenian). Vol. III. Еrеvan: Armenpress. pp. 106–107, 141.
- Patkanian, Kerovbe (1874). История монголов по армянским источникам [History of the Mongols according to Armenian sources] (in Russian). Printing house of the Imperial Academy of Sciences. ISBN 978-5-518-05661-9.
- Sublet, J. (1974). "La Folie de la princesse Bint al-Ašraf (un scandale financier sous les Mamelouks Bahris)". Bulletin d'études orientales. 27: 45–50. ISSN 0253-1623. JSTOR 41603356.
