= Baha al-Din Qaraqush =

Military Commander of Saladin

Baha al-Din Qaraqush al-Asadi al-Rumi al-Maliki al-Nasiri (Arabic: بهاء الدين أبو سعيد قراقوش بن عبد الله الأسدي) was a eunuch military commander in the service of Saladin. He served as palace chamberlain and gaoler of the deposed Fatimid dynasty, and undertook for his master the construction of the Citadel of Cairo and the fortification of Acre. After Saladin's death, he served as regent of Egypt for the Ayyubid sultans al-Aziz Uthman and al-Mansur, until he was forced to retire. He died in 1201. Although highly esteemed by contemporaries and historians, his posthumous reputation derives chiefly from a satirical pamphlet by a political opponent that lampoons him as a stupid and tyrannical monarch.

== Life ==
The origin and early life of Qaraqush are unknown; not even the name of his father survives, and he was known in Arabic with the patronymic ibn Abdallah (i.e., 'son of a [nameless] servant of God'). His year of birth is unknown, but in 1189 he was already considered as very old, and is reputed to have known Godfrey of Bouillon, one of the principal leaders of the First Crusade and first King of Jerusalem, who died in 1100. He was set free by Asad al-Din Shirkuh, who raised him to the position of military commander. At the time of Shirkuh's invasion of Fatimid Egypt in 1168, he commanded a corps of 3,000 Oghuz cavalry.

=== Career under Saladin ===
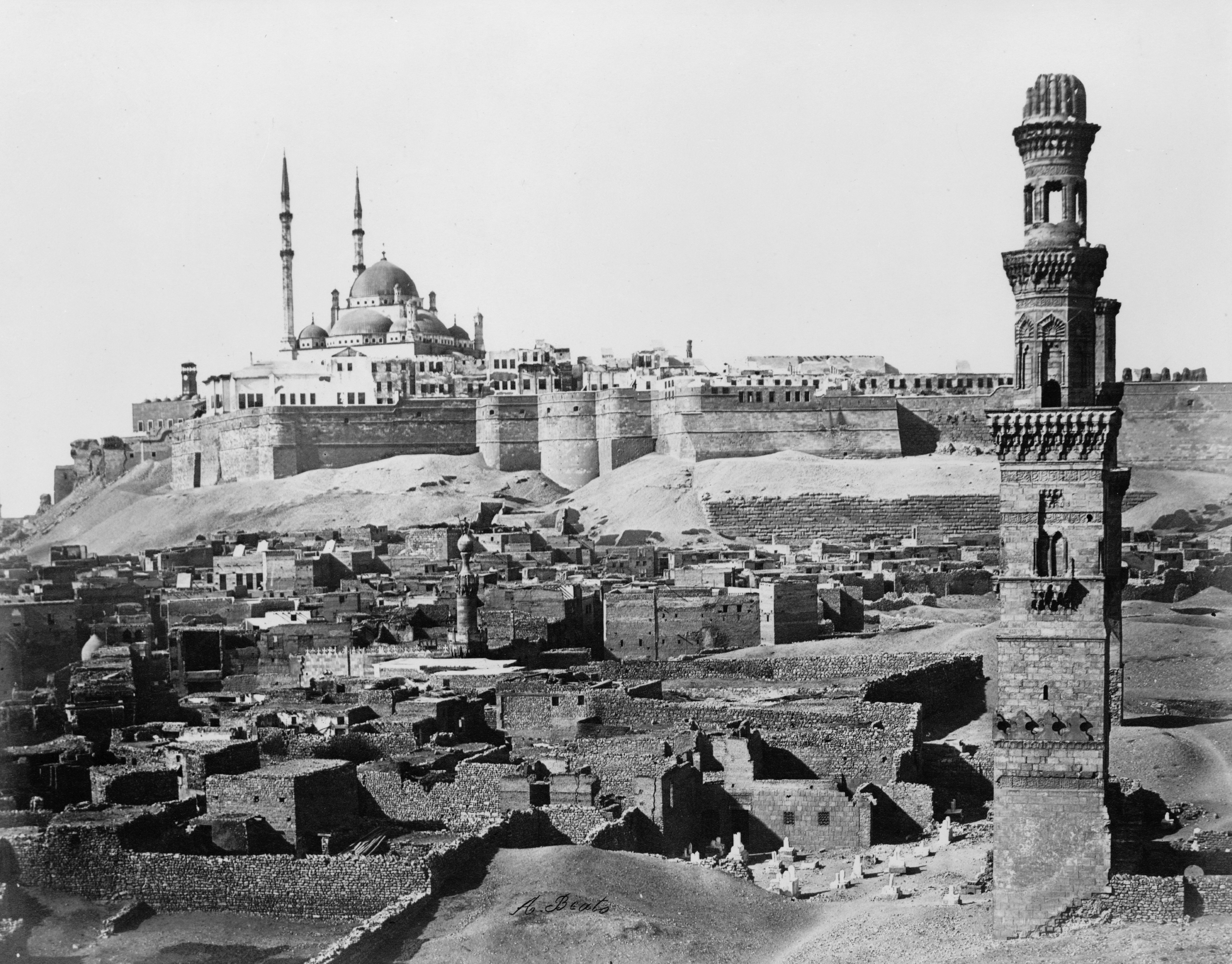
View of the Citadel of Cairo, originally built by Qaraqush for Saladin, from the south in the late 19th century, with the later Mamluk and Ottoman additions

When Shirkuh, newly named vizier of the Fatimid Caliphate, died in March 1169, Qaraqush sided with the qadi Isa al-Hakkari to secure the succession of Shirkuh's nephew, Saladin, as vizier.

Following the killing of the Fatimid palace chamberlain Mu'tamin al-Khilafa and the suppression of the subsequent uprising of the black troops in August 1169, Qaraqush was appointed chamberlain. Deprived of any military support, the Fatimid caliph, al-Adid, was now completely at Saladin's mercy, and closely watched over in his own palace by Qaraqush. When al-Adid died in September 1171, and the Fatimid Caliphate was abolished by Saladin, the members of the Fatimid dynasty, some 250 in number, were placed under virtual house arrest in various palaces under the care of Qaraqush. He exercised this task with great strictness, and to prevent the Fatimid clan from increasing, he separated the women from the men.

In 1171, Qaraqush was charged by Saladin with repairs to the city walls of Cairo. In 1176, he undertook the construction of the Citadel of Cairo on the Muqattam Hills, and the enlargement of the city walls to include the new citadel and Fustat. In summer 1187, he was summoned to reinforce the defences of the port city of Acre, which Saladin wanted to turn into his main base for operations against the Crusaders. He remained in the city during its long siege by the Crusaders, and was taken prisoner when it fell in July 1191. Saladin ransomed him shortly after against the large sum of 20,000 gold dinars.

=== Later years ===
Following Saladin's death in 1193, Qarakush entered the service of Saladin's second son and new sultan of Egypt, al-Aziz Uthman. Al-Aziz appointed Qaraqush as his deputy when he was absent from Egypt, and then regent for his underage heir, al-Mansur.

When al-Mansur ascended the throne, Qaraqush received the high title of atabeg, but was soon forced to retire by the commanders and the chief secretary, Ibn Mammati, likely due to his advanced age, and replaced as regent by another of Saladin's sons, al-Afdal.

Almost nothing is heard of Qaraqush thereafter, except that he died on 7 April 1201, and was buried in a mausoleum at the cemetery at the foot of the Muqattam Hills.

== Legacy ==
=== In historiography ===
Medieval historians generally portray Qaraqush in very favourable terms, highlighting his abilities, especially as a builder. The 13th-century scholar Ibn Khallikan comments in his famous Biographical Dictionary that he was "a man of lofty spirit and singularly favoured by fortune in all his proceedings". Apart from the Cairo Citadel and the fortifications of Acre, he was notable also in building his house, a hippodrome, and a bridge to Giza in Cairo, by reusing stones from the ancient pyramids, as well as a caravenserai outside the Bab al-Futuh gate and a ribat at al-Maqs.

His contemporary, the official and historian Imad al-Din al-Isfahani, dismisses Qaraqush as "a Turk who had neither knowledge of books nor familiarity with literature", but this reflects rather Imad al-Din's prejudices as a self-conscious 'man of the pen' against the military class, which furthermore, unlike the Arab and Iranian-dominated civilian elites, was composed of Turks and Kurds.

=== Object of satire ===
Despite the high esteem he was held in by contemporaries, Qaraqush was best known in later times as the eponymous 'hero' of a collection of satirical anecdotes known as Kitāb al-fāshūsh fi Aḥkām Qarāqūsh, or 'Book on the Stupidity in the Judgements of Qaraqush'. The book contains a series of supposed absurd verdicts by Qaraqush, who in later editions is portrayed as a sultan. Begun by Ibn Mammati, its stories circulated widely in Egypt, and were collected and rewritten by Abu'l-Fadl Abd al-Rahman al-Suyuti (1445–1505) and Abd al-Salam al-Malki (1564–1668). It is unclear why Ibn Mammati should have chosen Qaraqush as the subject for this collection, as the stories have no relation to the real person. Already Ibn Khallikan was obliged to comment on these stories:

A number of extraordinary decisions are attributed to Qarâqûsh, as having been pronounced by him during his administration; nay, things have gone so far that al-Asaad Ibn Mammati composed a small volume under the title of Kitâb al-Fâshûsh fi Ahkām Qarâqûsh (stupidity, or the decisions of Qarâqûsh) and containing things which it is highly improbable that such a man as Qarâqûsh could have said or done. They are manifestly mere inventions, for [Saladin] would not have confided to him the affairs of the empire unless he had an entire confidence in his knowledge and abilities.

Modern historians speculate on a political rivalry between the two men, but the only known clash between the two is Ibn Mammati opposing Qaraqush's appointment as regent over al-Mansur due to his age. At any rate, the exaggerated stories circulated by Ibn Mammati to discredit his rival succeeded: the work proved so popular that the historical person has been forever overshadowed by the anecdotes, and the name 'Qaraqush' has become a "byword of stupidity", and a "symbol of a lunatic tyrant".

== Sources ==
- Dowaidar, Ibrahim (2020). "Political Humor in Ibn Mammātī's Kitāb al-Fāshūsh fi Aḥkām Qarâqûsh (The Decisions of Qarâqûsh)". Open Linguistics. 6 (1): 482–511. doi:10.1515/opli-2020-0029. S2CID 225071041.
- Ehrenkreutz, Andrew S. (1972). Saladin. Albany: State University of New York Press. ISBN 0-87395-095-X.
- Halm, Heinz (2014). Kalifen und Assassinen: Ägypten und der vordere Orient zur Zeit der ersten Kreuzzüge, 1074–1171 [Caliphs and Assassins: Egypt and the Near East at the Time of the First Crusades, 1074–1171] (in German). Munich: C. H. Beck. doi:10.17104/9783406661648-1. ISBN 978-3-406-66163-1.
- Ibn Khallikan (1843). Ibn Khallikan's Biographical Dictionary, Translated from the Arabic. Vol. II. Translated by Baron Mac Guckin de Slane. Paris: Oriental Translation Fund of Great Britain and Ireland. OCLC 832287342.
- Lev, Yaacov (1999). Saladin in Egypt. Leiden, Boston, Köln: Brill. ISBN 90-04-11221-9.
- Lyons, Malcolm Cameron; Jackson, D. E. P. (1982). Saladin: The Politics of the Holy War. Cambridge: Cambridge University Press. ISBN 0-521-31739-8.
- Sobernheim, M. (1978). "Ḳarāḳūs̲h̲". In van Donzel, E.; Lewis, B.; Pellat, Ch. & Bosworth, C. E. (eds.). The Encyclopaedia of Islam, Second Edition. Volume IV: Iran–Kha. Leiden: E. J. Brill. pp. 613–614. ISBN 978-90-04-05745-6. OCLC 758278456.
