= Ivane I Zakarian =

Armenian general (died 1227)

Ivane I Zakarian Իվանե Ա Զաքարյան
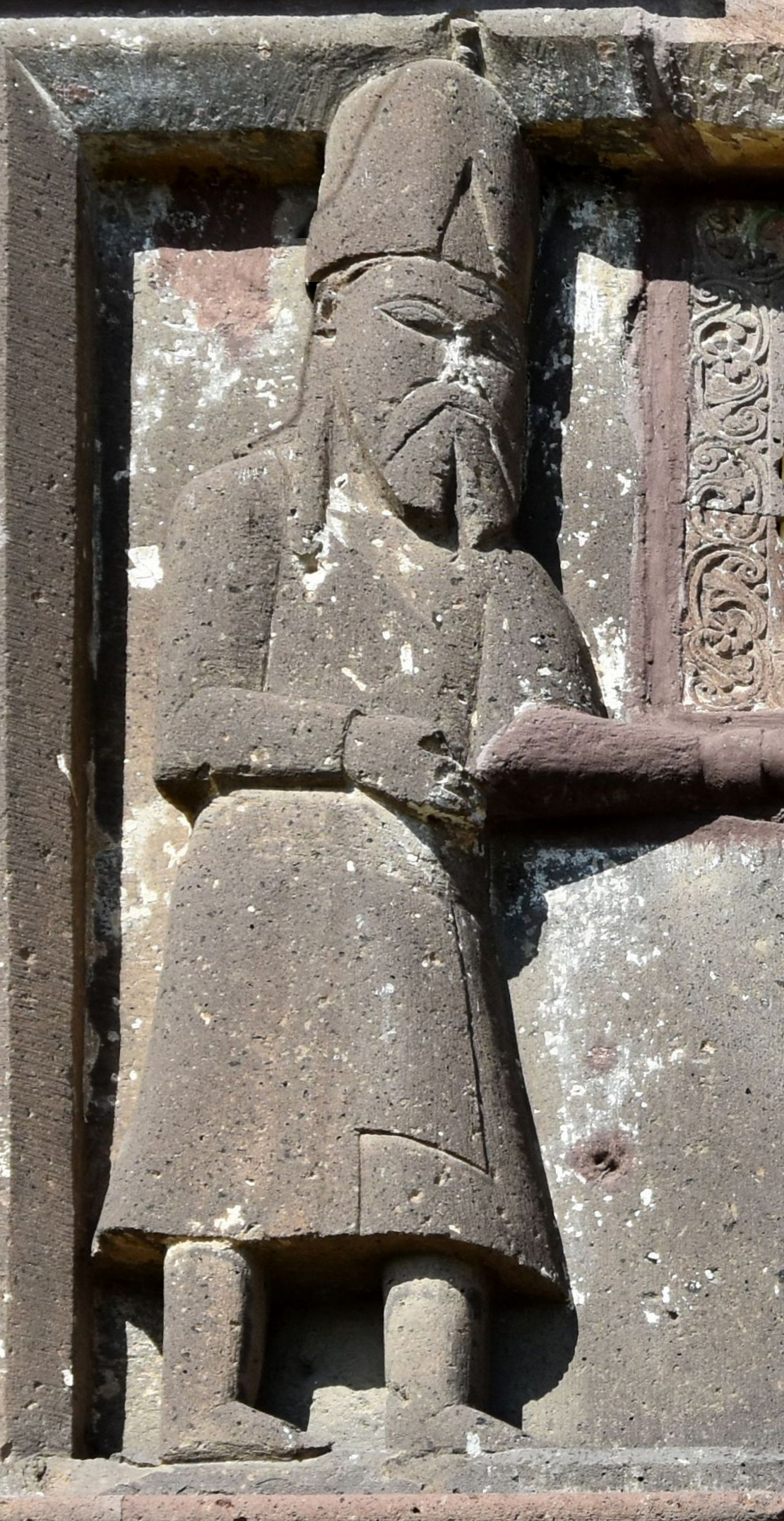
- Ivane on the east facade at Harichavank, Armenia, 1201. He wears the contemporary costume, with tall sharbush hat and heavy kaftans.

Msakhurtukhutsesi
- In office 1191–1213
- Preceded by: Vardan I Dadiani
- Succeeded by: Vache I Vachutian

Atabeg
- In office 1213–1227
- Preceded by: None (Creation)
- Succeeded by: Avag Zakarian

Personal details
- Born: Unknown
- Died: 1227
- Children: Tamta Mkhargrdzeli; Avag Zakarian
- Parent(s): Sargis Zakarian (father); Saakdukht Artsruni (mother)

Military service
- Battles/wars: Battle of Shamkor; Battle of Basiani; Siege of Kars; Siege of Ganja; Battle of Khunan; Battle of Garni; Ayyubid-Georgian war: Siege of Ahlat (1209)

Ivane I Zakarian (Armenian: Իվանե Ա Զաքարյան; Georgian: ივანე I მხარგრძელი, romanized: ivane I mkhargrdzeli) was an Armenian prince, and a Court official of the Kingdom of Georgia holding the offices of Msakhurtukhutsesi (Majordomo) and Atabeg (Governor General) for Queen Tamar of Georgia during the early 13th centuries. He was a prince of the Zakarid dynasty, the son of Sargis Zakarian, and the younger brother and successor of Zakare II Zakarian. He was also ruler of feudal lands in the Kingdom of Georgia.

== Biography ==
The brothers, Zakare and Ivane Zakarian, who were sons of Sargis, were the most successful representatives of the family, who were military commanders under Queen Tamar. Zakare and Ivane took Dvin in 1193 from the Seljuk Eldiguzids. They also took Sevan, Bjni, Amberd and Bargushat, and all the towns above the city of Ani, up to the bridge of Khodaafarin bridge. Around the year 1199, they took the city of Ani, and in 1201, Tamar gave Ani to them as a principality. Eventually, their territories came to resemble those of Bagratid Armenia. Their achievements under Queen Tamar also facilitated the first large-scale migration of Kurdish tribes to the Caucasus.

Still, Ivane and Zakare encountered animosity in some quarters because of their religious affiliation to Armenian Monophysism, rather than the Chalcedonian faith of the Georgians. The younger brother, Ivane eventually converted, allowing the two brothers to adroitely bridge the religious spectrum in Georgia, Ivane commanding Georgian troops while Zakare commanded Armenian ones. Conflicts regarding devotional practices still erupted between the two armies, hampering coordinated operations, as in a military campaign 1204. A synod had to be convened at the highest level, and the Armenians agreed to harmonize some practices.

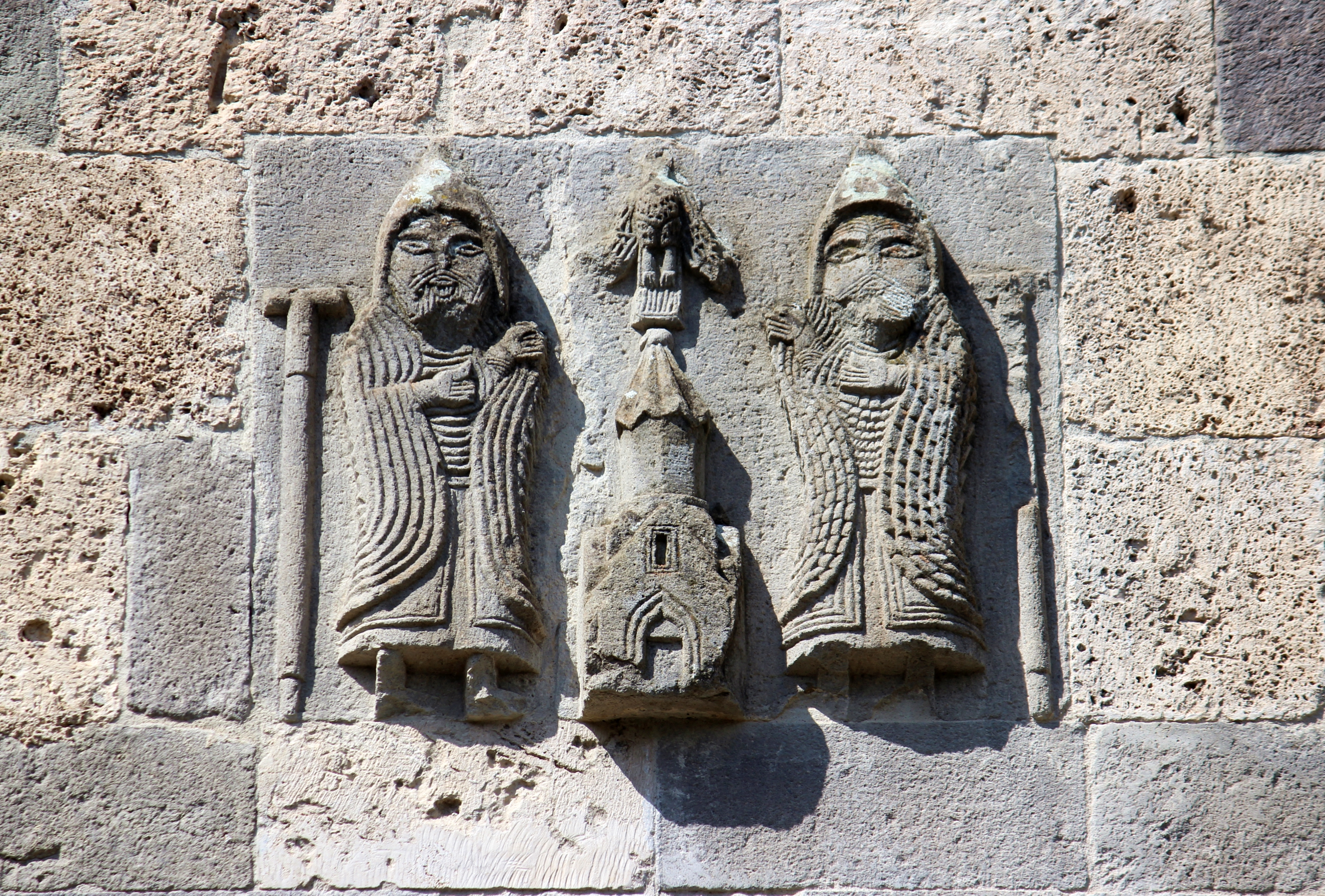
Low-relief depiction of Zakare and Ivane.

In 1208, Ivane had challenged the powerful Ayyubid dynasty, attacking the former beylik of the Shah-Armens whose realm extended around Lake Van and which had been absorbed by the Ayyubids in 1207. The ruler of Ahlat was Al-Awhad Ayyub, son of Sultan Al-Adil I and nephew of Sultan Saladin. While the Georgian army besieged Ahlat, Ivane was captured, whereupon Ivane's brother, Zakare threatened to raze the city and put its population to the sword. Ivane was released only after the Georgians agreed to the Thirty Years' Truce on following terms: Georgia had to return the captured fortresses and captives, Georgians paid a ransom of 100,000 dinars and hand Ivane's daughter Tamta to al-Awhad.

The brothers commanded the Armenian-Georgian armies for almost three decades, achieving major victories at Shamkor in 1195 and Basen in 1203 and leading raids into northern Iran in 1210 and suppression of rebellions of mountaineers in 1212. They amassed a great fortune, governing all of northern Armenia; Zakare and his descendants ruled in northwestern Armenia with Ani as their capital, while Ivane and his offspring ruled eastern Armenia, including the city of Dvin.

Both brothers left several bilingual inscriptions across the Armeno-Georgian border lands and built several churches and forts, such as the Harichavank Monastery and Akhtala Monastery in northern Armenia. The family went in decline with the establishment of Mongol power in the Caucasus.

One of the vassals of Ivane Zakarian was Vasak Khaghbakian ("Vasak the Great"), who had helped in the reconquest of Vayots Dzor, Bjni, and Dvin, and was the father of Prosh Khaghbakian, the founder of the Proshyan dynasty.

=== Atabegate ===
When his brother Zakare died in 1213, Ivane was offered the title of Amirspasalar, but he declined. Instead, he asked for and obtained the title of Atabeg, which gave him the highest position in government. According to a contemporary Armenian historian, he said:

The honour which you have done is very great indeed. But I am not worthy to be called by my brother's name and do not wish to be ashamed of taking his place, so grant me the title of atabek, for in Georgia you, kings, do not yet have such a title. By so doing you will augment your favour to me, for you will bestow a new high honour on le, award me the title of Atabek, as is the custom with the sultans for, according to the law of the sultans, the atabek is the father and tutor of kings and sultans, and [for this reason] is called atabek.

— Discourse of Ivane.

=== Monastic contributions ===
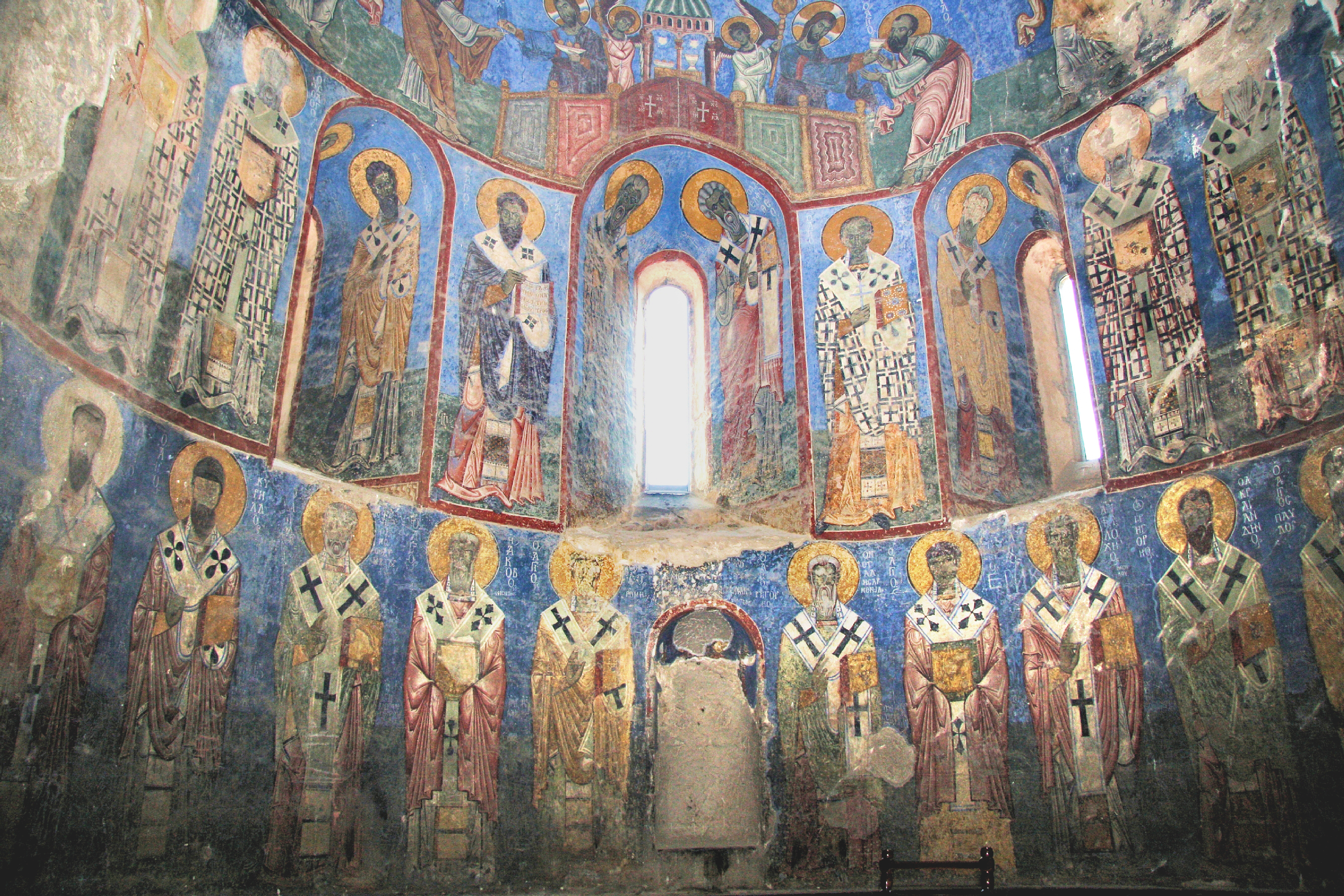
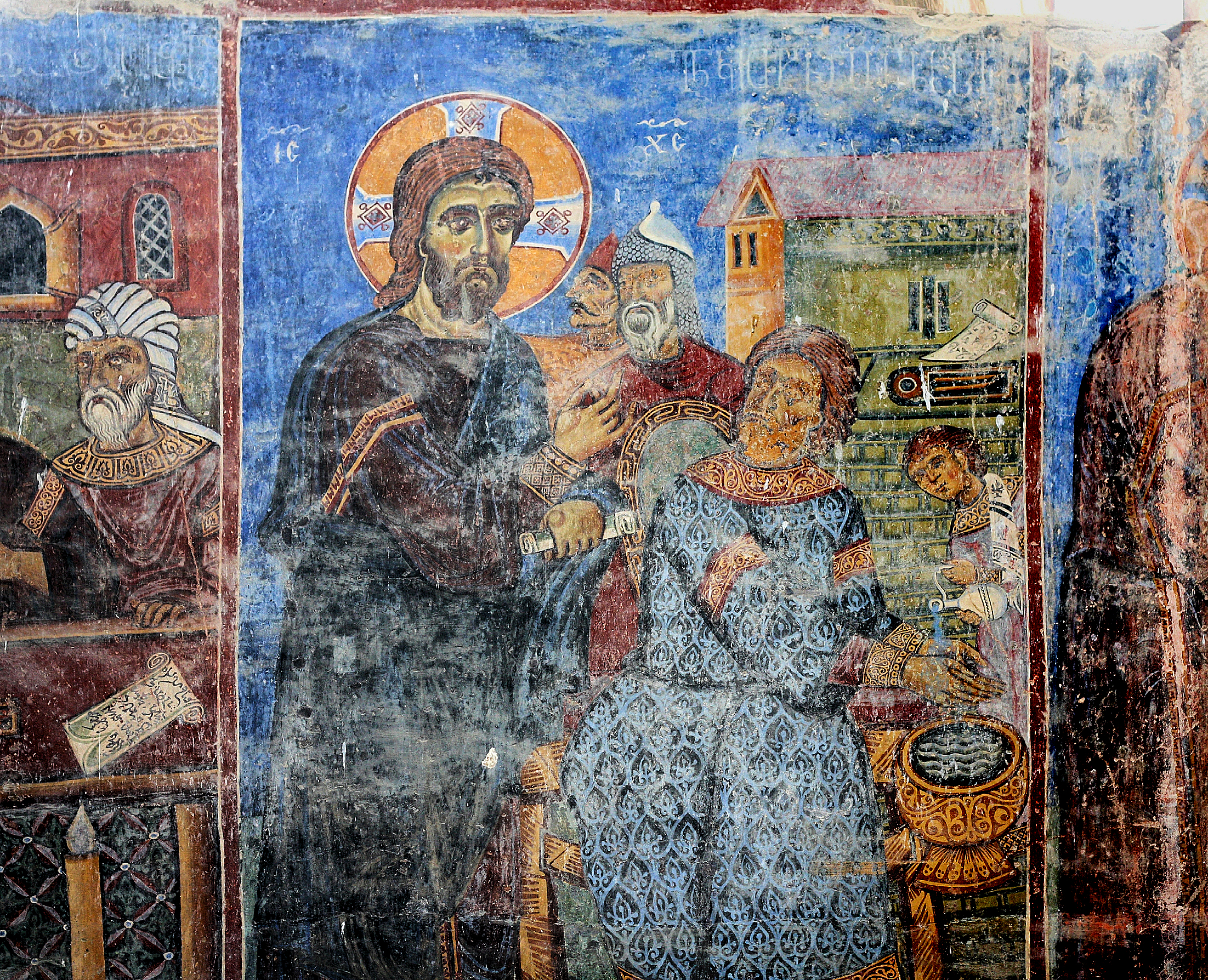
The murals of Akhtala Monastery, in Armenian-Chalcedonian style, were commissioned by Ivane in 1205-1216.

Ivane and his brother Zakare encountered animosity in some quarters because of their religious affiliation to Armenian Monophysism, rather than the Chalcedonian faith of the Georgians. Ivane eventually converted around 1200, allowing the two brothers to adroitely bridge the religious spectrum in Georgia, Ivane commanding Georgian troops while Zakare commanded Armenian ones.

The beautiful murals of Akhtala Monastery, commissioned by Ivane in 1205–1216, are an example of Armenian-Chalcedonian art, blending Byzantine, Armenian and Georgian styles.

Ivane also founded the Tejharuyk Monastery in 1196–99, the Church of the Mother of God (Surb-Astuacacin) in the Monastery of Haṙič, and renovated Haghartsin Monastery together with his brother Zakare, which he selected as the family's burial ground.

== Mongol and Kipchack invasions ==
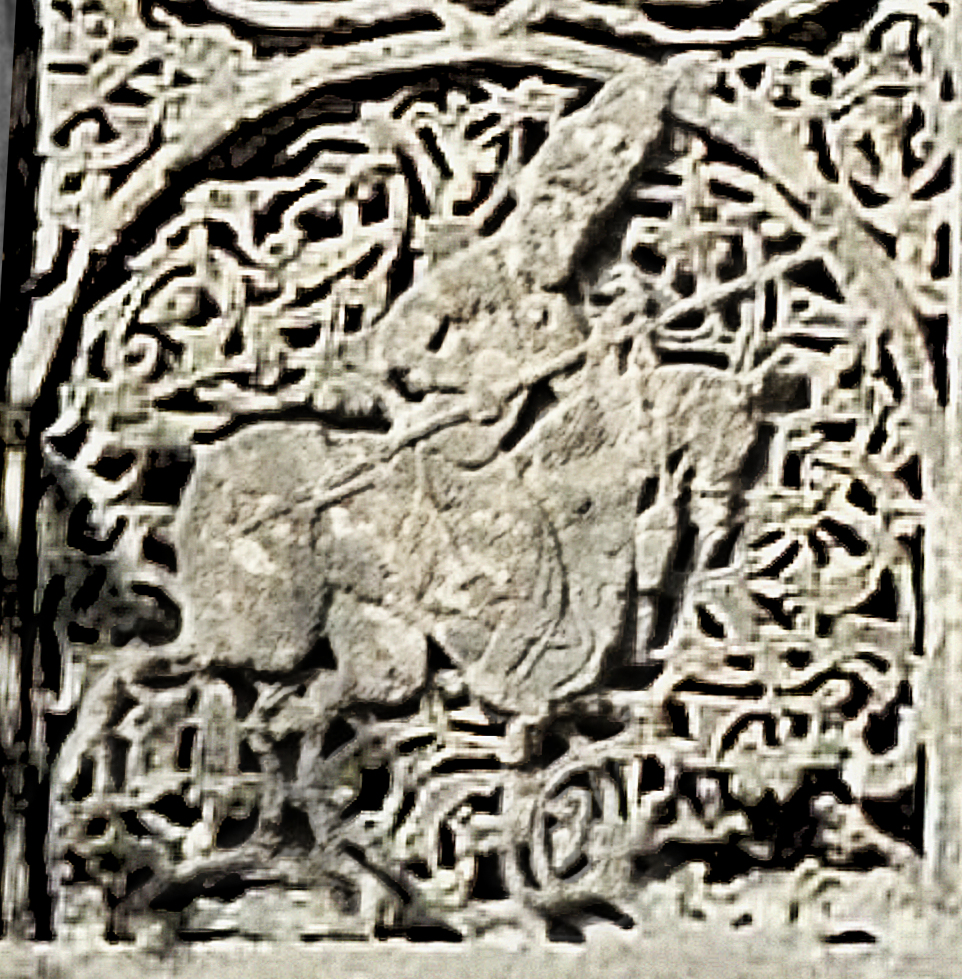
Zakarid Prince Grigor Khaghbakian on horse, in his khatchkar (1233). He fought against the Kipchacks under the command of Ivane.

The 13th century Armenian historian Kirakos Gandzaketsi reports the first 1220 Mongol incursions under Subutai, part of the Mongol invasions of Georgia. This first wave was only composed of 3 tümen (30,000 men), and was actually on a search for the fugitive Khwarizmian ruler Muhammad II of Khwarazm. The Zakarids served under the Georgian king George IV of Georgia to repulse them, with Ivane acting as atabeg (Governor General) and Amirspasalar (Commander-in-chief), their army only half the size of the Mongol one. The Georgians and Armenians were defeated, but the Mongol retreated with heavy losses. The Mongols came back the following year, but were blocked on the road to Tbilissi by an army of 70,000. The Mongols again won, but retreated to Tabriz. A third encounter the same year virtually annihilated the Georgian army, and the Mongols continued north to confront the Kipchaks at far as Soldaia, and the Rus' Principalities at the Battle of the Kalka River. Before dying, George IV made an alliance with the Sultanate of Rum, by marrying his sister Rusudan to Ghias ad-Din, son of the emir of Erzurum.

In 1222, the Kipchaks, fleeing from Mongol devastation, came to the Armenian city of Gandzak, where they encountered the troops of the atabeg Ivane Zakarian, who were again defeated. Although the Georgians ultimately prevailed in 1223, the Zakarian Prince Grigor Khaghbakian was captured and tortured to death by the Kipchak Turks.

When the Khwarazmians under Jalal al-Din Mangburni invaded the region in 1226–1230, Dvin was ruled by the aging Ivane, who had given Ani to his nephew Shahnshah, son of Zakare. Dvin was lost, but Kars and Ani did not surrender.

In 1225, Ivane, leading Georgian troops, was defeated against the Khwarizmian troops of Jalal al-Din Mangburni, at the Battle of Garni. This defeat led to royal court of Georgian Queen Rusudan (1223–1245) moving north to Kutaisi, which exposed the south of the country to subsequent looting during the Mongol invasions of Georgia.

== Death ==
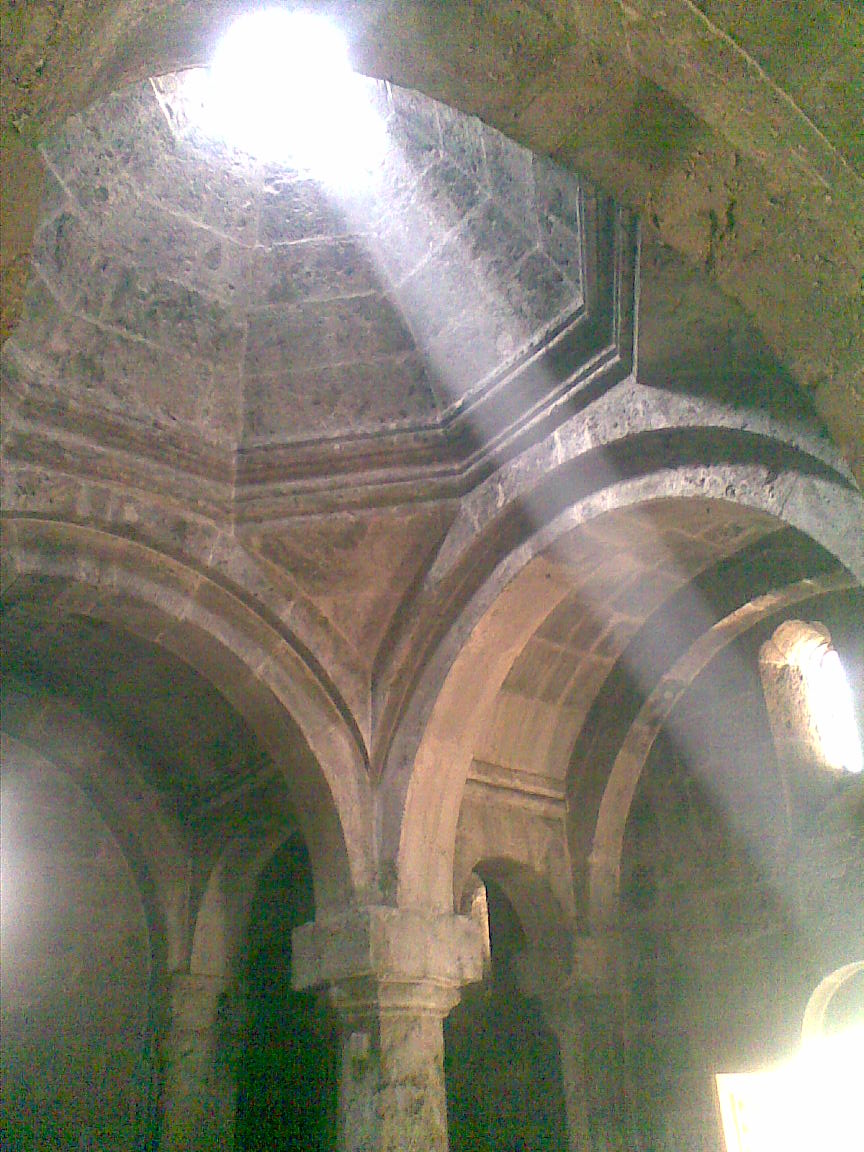
Haghartsin Monastery zhamatun built by Ivane I Zakarian c. 1215.

Ivane remained Atabeg until his death in 1227, when he was succeeded by his son Avag Zakarian. The function of Amirspasalar was held by his nephew Shahnshah Zakarian, who had inherited from his father Zakare in 1212.

Ivane was buried in Akhtala Monastery, where he was followed by his son Avag and other members of his family. The 13th-century historians Kirakos Gandzaketsi and Vardan Areveltsi called the area Pghndzahank (copper mine), because of rich copper deposits in the surroundings. Gandzaketsi writes the following of the year 1227: "Ivane, Zakare's brother, also died [that year] and was buried at Pghndzahank near the church which he himself had built, taking it from the Armenians and making it into a Georgian monastery", referring to the fact that Ivane had converted to the Georgian Chalcedonian faith.

== Sources ==
- Baumer, Christoph (2024). History of the Caucasus. Volume 2: In the shadow of great powers / Christoph Baumer. London New York: I.B. Tauris. ISBN 9780755636303.
- Rayfield, Donald (2012). Edge of Empires, a History of Georgia. London: Reaktion Books. ISBN 978-1-78023-070-2.
- Minorsky, Vladimir (1953). Studies in Caucasian History. New York: Taylor's Foreign Press. ISBN 0-521-05735-3.
