= Siege of Toron =

German Crusader siege of Toron (1197–98)

Siege of Toron (1197–1198)
- Part of the Crusade of 1197
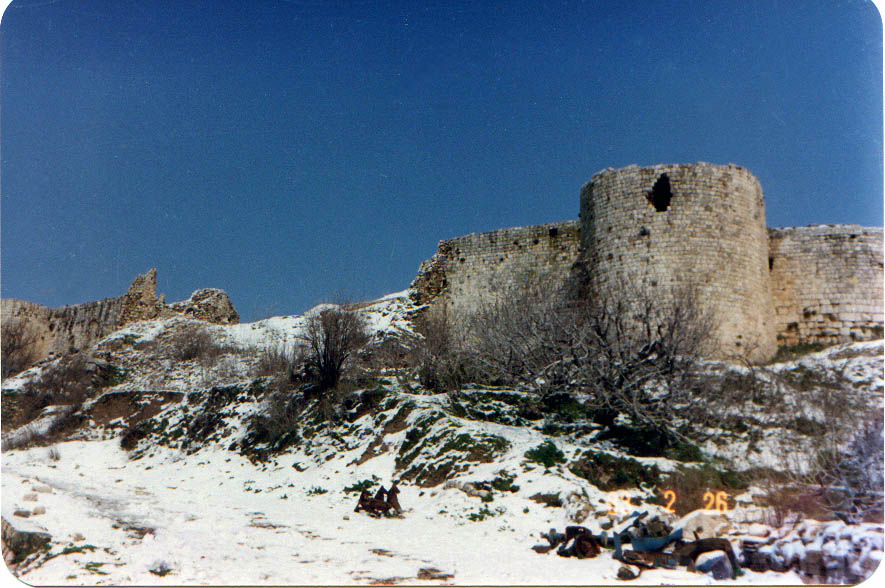
- Castle of Toron
| Date | 28 November 1197 – 2 February 1198 |
| Location | Toron |
| Result | Ayyubid victory |

Belligerents
| Holy Roman Empire; Kingdom of Jerusalem | Ayyubid Dynasty |

Commanders and leaders
| Conrad of Querfurt; Henry of Brabant; Amalric of Lusignan | Husam al-Din Bishara; Al-Adil I |

Strength
| Unknown | Unknown |

Casualties and losses
| Heavy | Unknown |

The siege of Toron was a military engagement between the armies of the German Crusade and the Ayyubid garrison of Toron. The Crusader army besieged the city from November 1197 to February 1198. The siege failed the Crusader forces.

== Background ==
Taking advantage of the Ayyubid concentration at Jaffa, King Amalric, with the help of the German Crusaders under Henry of Brabant, launched a campaign to capture Sidon and Beirut. Sidon had already been demolished when the Crusaders arrived there. Sidon was occupied and marched towards Beirut. The governor of Beirut, Usama, seeing no help coming from Al-Adil, decided to destroy the walls and withdraw from the city, thus allowing the Crusaders to capture it.

Now the Crusaders were prepared to move inland, and their next target was the great fortress of Toron. Toron was a well-chosen goal as it would provide a strong defense to Tyre, a foothold for a possible conquest of Galilee to the south, and give the Crusaders a strong point to attack Damascus.

== Siege ==
Encouraged by their success, the Germans, under Archbishop Conrad of Querfurt, marched towards the castle of Toron and laid siege to it on November 28, 1197. The Crusaders then began undermining the castle walls. Setting fire under the walls made them collapse. Due to this, the Ayyubid garrison offered to surrender by giving up the castle and freeing 500 Christian prisoners lying in the dungeons in exchange for their lives. Conrad, however, demanded unconditional surrender, and the Levantine Crusaders, fearing that a massacre might provoke a Muslim jihad, sent to warn Al-Adil that the Germans wouldn't spare any lives.

Seeing that negotiations did not lead to any results, the Ayyubid garrison took arms and defended the castle vigorously. They managed to destroy the tunnel the Crusaders had built, burning and slaughtering them, with some being dragged outside and beheaded from the walls. The Germans began to grow tired of the siege. Meanwhile, the Germans received news that their emperor, Henry, had died, forcing Conrad and his men to raise the siege. On February 2, 1198, an Ayyubid relief army was marching towards Toron, and the Germans were prepared to meet them. However, rumors spread that the high-ranking lords had escaped, prompting them to retreat towards Tyre. As they retreated, they were harassed by the armies of Al-Adil, suffering many casualties.

== Aftermath ==
Thus ended the German Crusade of 1197; it brought nothing to restore German prestige, but it did help the Levantine Crusaders capture Beirut. Once the Germans went home, King Amalric made a peace treaty with Al-Adil, giving him control of Jaffa while the Crusaders had Beirut. Sidon was divided between Christians and Muslims. Lasting for 5 years and 8 months, proving advantageous to Al-Adil.

== Sources ==
- Runciman, Steven (1954). A History Of The Crusades, Vol. III. Penguin Book.
- Loud, Graham (2019). The Chronicle of Arnold of Lübeck, 1st Edition.
- Murray, Alan V. (2015). The Crusades to the Holy Land, The Essential Reference Guide. Bloomsbury Publishing USA. ISBN 9781610697804.
- Humphreys, R. Stephen (1977). From Saladin to the Mongols: The Ayyubids of Damascus, 1193-1260. State University of New York Press. ISBN 9781438407272.
