= Al-Ashraf Musa ibn Adil =

Ayyubid emir of Jazira (1201–1229) and Damascus (1229–1237)

Al-Ashraf Musa
- Emir of Jazirah; King of Armenia; Emir of Damascus
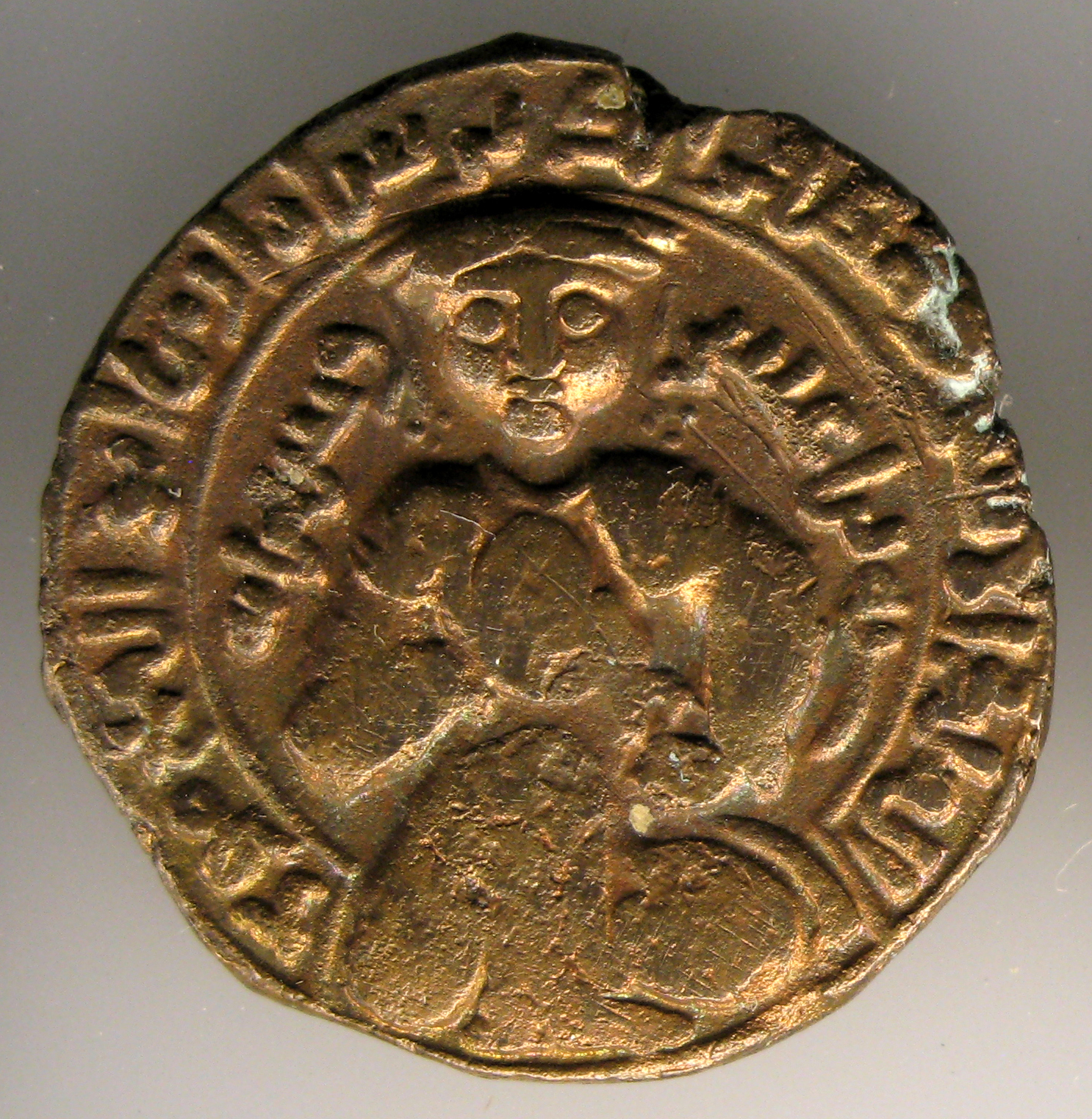
- copper coin of Al-Ashraf muzaffar al-din in Al-Jazira

Emir of Jazira
- Reign: 1210–1229
- Predecessor: Al-Awhad Ayyub
- Successor: Al-Muzaffar Ghazi

Sultan of Sham
- Reign: 1229–1237
- Predecessor: An-Nasir Dawud
- Successor: Al-Salih Ismail
- Born: 1178
- Died: 27 August 1237 (aged 58–59)
- Spouse: Terjan Khatun; Tamta Mkhargrdzeli
- Dynasty: Ayyubid
- Father: Al-Adil I
- Religion: Sunni Islam

Al-Ashraf or al-Ashraf Musa or Al-Ashraf Shah Arman (died 27 August 1237), fully Al-Ashraf Musa Abu'l-Fath al-Muzaffar ad-Din, was a Kurdish ruler of the Ayyubid dynasty.

== Governor of the Jazira (1201–1229) ==
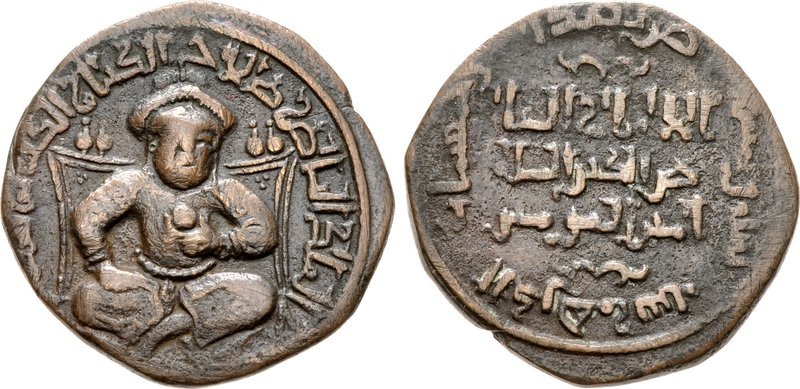
Portrait of Saladin on a dirham minted under Al-Ashraf Musa in 1215-1216, with obverse legend: "The Victorious King, Righteousness of the World and the Faith, Yusuf ibn Ayyub" and Caliph al-Nasir in the three lines. Probable Mayyafariqin mint, dated 1215. Similar coins were also minted during Saladin's lifetime.

The son of Sultan al-Adil I, al-Ashraf was installed by his father in Harran in 1201 as Governor of the Jezireh. He continued to rule the region after the death of his father in 1218 until 1229.

=== Conquest of Khilat ===
In 1207, the Shah-Arman was taken over by the Ayyubids, who had long coveted Ahlat. The Ayyubids had come to the city at the invitation of people of Ahlat after the last Sökmenli ruler was killed by Tuğrulshah, the ruler (melik) of Erzurum on behalf of the Sultanate of Rum and brother of Sultan Kayqubad I. By 1209 Georgia challenged Ayyubid rule in the Armenian highlands and led a liberation war for south Armenia. The Georgian army besieged Khlat. In response, Ayyubid Sultan al-Adil I assembled and personally led a large army that included the emirs of Homs, Hama, and Baalbek as well as contingents from other Ayyubid principalities to support al-Awhad, emir of Jazira. During the siege, Georgian general Ivane Mkhargrdzeli accidentally fell into the hands of the al-Awhad on the outskirts of Ahlat. Using Ivane as a bargaining chip, al-Awhad agreed to release him in return for a thirty year truce with Georgia, thus ending the immediate Georgian threat to the Ayyubids. This brought the struggle for the Armenian lands to a stall, leaving the Lake Van region to the Ayyubids of Damascus.

During his tenure, he minted some coins with the effigy of Saladin and the legend "The Victorious King, Righteousness of the World and the Faith, Yusuf ibn Ayyub", following the model of earlier coins from the time of Saladin himself.

His coinage was minted in Mayyafariqin, Sinjar, Akhlat, Erbil, Harran.

He took the Tamta, daughter of Ivane Mkhargrdzeli as one of his wives.

== Emir of Damascus (1229–1237) ==
After his brother al-Mu'azzam's death in 1227, al-Ashraf received a request from his nephew, al-Muazzam's son, An-Nasir Dawud, for aid in opposing his brother al-Kamil of Egypt. Instead, al-Ashraf and al-Kamil came to an agreement to divide their nephew's lands between them. Al-Ashraf captured Damascus in June 1229 and took control of the city, serving as emir of Damascus until his death in 1237. He took Baalbek as well in 1230. In return, he ceded his lands in Mesopotamia to al-Kamil and acknowledged his supremacy, while an-Nasir had to be satisfied with the possession of a principality centered on Kerak in the Transjordan region. A number of years later, al-Ashraf began to chafe under his brother's authority, and in 1237 allied himself with Kayqubad I, the Seljuk Sultan of Rûm, and various Ayyubid princelings based in Syria, against al-Kamil. However, Kayqubad died early in the summer of that year, and al-Ashraf himself died on 27 August, breaking up the alliance. Al-Ashraf was succeeded in Damascus by his younger brother, as-Salih Ismail.

== See also ==
- Aqsab Mosque

== Sources ==
- Nicolle, David (20 December 2011). Saladin. Bloomsbury Publishing. ISBN 978-1-84908-318-8.

Regnal titles
Preceded by Al-Adil I	Emir of Harran; 1218–1229	Succeeded by As-Salih Ayyub
Preceded by An-Nasir Dawud	Emir of Damascus; 1229–1237	Succeeded by As-Salih Ismail
