= Ibn Mammati =

Egyptian poet, writer & administrator in Ayyubid dynasty

Al-As'ad ibn Muhadhdhab ibn Zakariyya ibn Kudama ibn Mina Sharaf al-Din Abu'l-Makarim ibn Sa'id ibn Abi'l-Malih ibn Mammati, better known simply by the family name Ibn Mammati, was an Egyptian official who served as head of the government departments under Saladin and his successor, al-Aziz Uthman, as well as being a noted poet and prolific writer.

== Origin ==
Al-As'ad ibn Mammati hailed from a family of Coptic Christians from Asyut. He was born in about 1149 in Egypt. His grandfather, Abu'l-Malih, entered the service of the then ruling Fatimid Caliphate and rose to become head secretary during the vizierate of Badr al-Jamali in the late 11th century. His father, Muhadhdhab, served as secretary of the army department (diwān al-jaysh) under the last Fatimid caliphs, and continued in office under Saladin (r. 1169–1193), until his death in 1182. Due to the anti-Christian policies imposed by Saladin's uncle, Shirkuh, Muhadhdhab and his family converted to Islam, as did a number of other Fatimid-era officials at the time, in order to preserve their positions. It is likely that this explains the family name 'Ibn Mammati', as the latter might be a corruption of the Coptic Mahometi, 'Mohammedan'.

== Life ==
Ibn Mammati succeeded his father as head of the diwān al-jaysh, and later was promoted to the headship of all the diwāns, holding that position under Saladin as well as his successor, al-Aziz Uthman (r. 1193–1198). He was a close friend and collaborator of Saladin's chief secretary, Qadi al-Fadil, but when the latter was replaced as vizier by Ibn Mammati's rival Safi al-Din Abdallah ibn Ali ibn Shukr, Ibn Mammati fell from favour. His property was confiscated, and he had to flee with his family to the court of al-Zahir, sultan of Aleppo. He died there in poverty on 29 November 1209, at the age of 62 Hijri years.

== Works ==
Apart from his work as an administrator, Ibn Mammati is best known as a poet and writer. Qadi al-Fadil esteemed his eloquence and praised him as the "nightingale of councils". He is known to have written 23 works, but most have been lost. Chief among those were a biography of Saladin in verse, a verse version of the Kalīla wa-Dimna. Ibn Khallikan, in his famous biographical dictionary, reproduces some verses from a collection of his poetry, apparently compiled by Ibn Mammati's son. His most famous work today is the Kitāb Qawānīn al-Dawāwīn (Arabic: كتاب قوانين الدواوين, lit. 'book of rules for the diwāns'), a four-volume guide to Egypt, its settlements, agricultural and irrigation systems, industries, taxation, mint, weights and measures, and a wealth of other information valuable to modern historians.

He is also the first author of a collection of satirical anecdotes known as Kitāb al-fāshūsh fi Aḥkām Qarāqūsh, or 'Book on the Stupidity in the Judgements of Qaraqush', lampooning his political rival, Baha al-Din Qaraqush. Begun by Ibn Mammati, its stories circulated widely in Egypt, and were collected and rewritten by Abu'l-Fadl Abd al-Rahman al-Suyuti (1445–1505) and Abd al-Salam al-Malki (1564–1668), and proved so popular that in subsequent centuries, the memory of the historical Qaraqush was obliterated and his name became "a symbol of a lunatic tyrant".

== Sources ==
- Atiya, A. S. (1971). "Ibn Mammātī". In Lewis, B.; Ménage, V. L.; Pellat, Ch. & Schacht, J. (eds.). The Encyclopaedia of Islam, Second Edition. Volume III: H–Iram. Leiden: E. J. Brill. pp. 862–863. OCLC 495469525.
- Dowaidar, Ibrahim (2020). "Political Humor in Ibn Mammātī's Kitāb al-Fāshūsh fi Aḥkām Qarâqûsh (The Decisions of Qarâqûsh)". Open Linguistics. 6 (1): 482–511. doi:10.1515/opli-2020-0029.
- Ibn Khallikan (1842). Ibn Khallikan's Biographical Dictionary, Translated from the Arabic. Vol. I. Translated by Baron Mac Guckin de Slane. Paris: Oriental Translation Fund of Great Britain and Ireland. OCLC 1184199260.
- Kapar, Mehmet Ali (1995). "Es'ad b. el-Memmâtî". TDV Encyclopedia of Islam, Vol. 11 (Elbi̇stan – Eymi̇r) (in Turkish). Istanbul: Presidency of Religious Affairs, Centre for Islamic Studies. pp. 349–350. ISBN 978-975-389-438-8.
- Lev, Yaacov (1999). Saladin in Egypt. Leiden, Boston, Köln: Brill. ISBN 90-04-11221-9.
