= Ayyubid-Georgian war (1208-1209) =

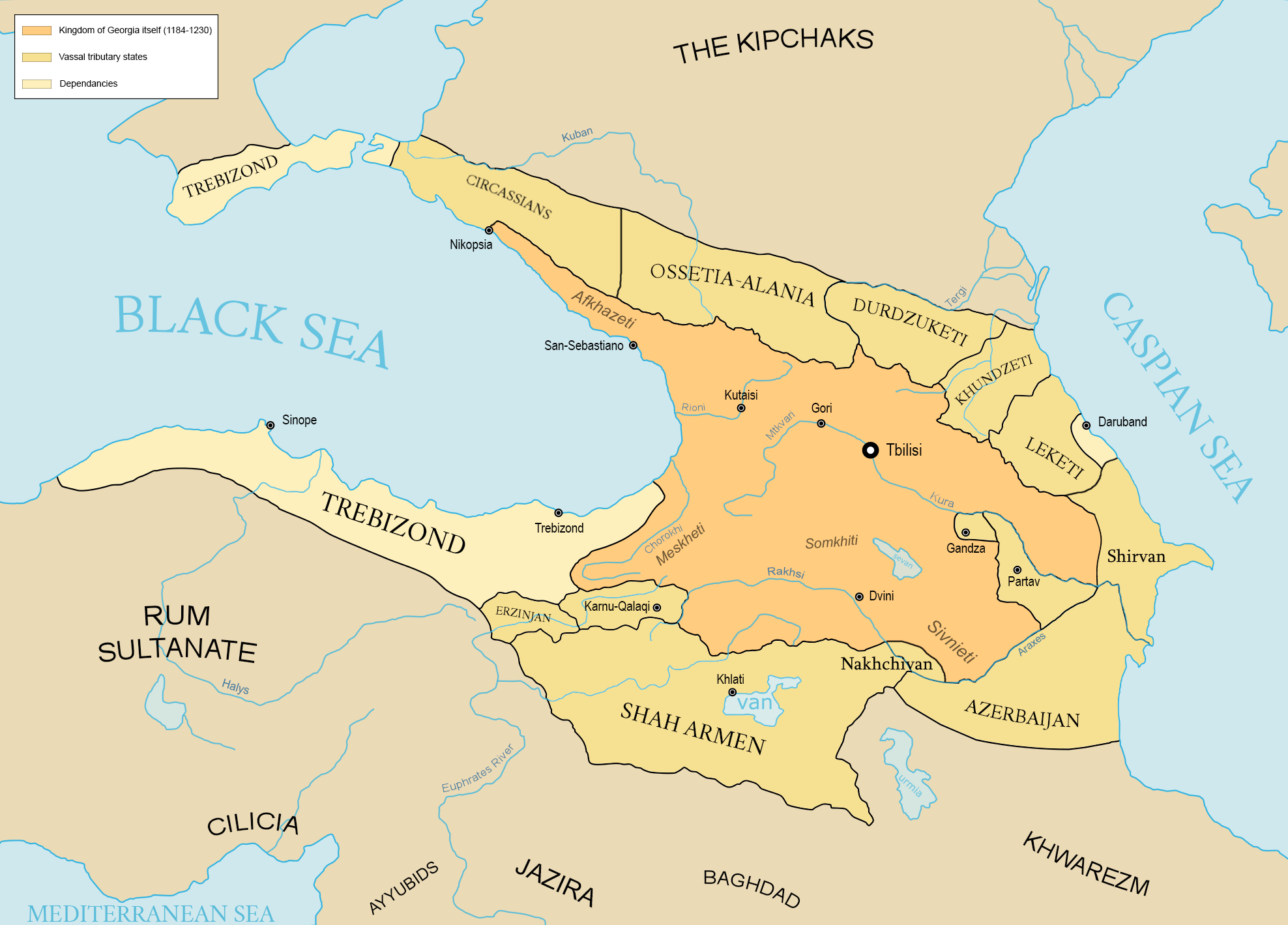
- A map showing the domains and tributaries of Georgia before the arrival of the Ayyubids.
Date	1208-1209
Location	Erciş, Ahlat
Result	Thirty Years' Truce
Territorial changes	The Aras River became the Ayyubid-Georgian border

Belligerents
Kingdom of Georgia	Ayyubid Dynasty

Commanders and leaders
Tamar of Georgia; Ivane Mhargrdzeli (POW)	Al-Adil I Al-Awhad Ayyub

Ayyubid-Georgian war, was a military campaign launched by the Kingdom of Georgia against the Ayyubid domains in Anatloia, betwenn 1208 and 1209.

== Background ==
in 1208, the Ayyubids seized the Shah-Armen Beylik, which had previously paid tribute to the Kingdom of Georgia. The Ayyubid advance into Anatolia was perceived as a threat by both the Anatolian beyliks and Georgia. Consequently, the Georgians decided to launch a campaign against Ahlat. This military advance was intended to strengthen the Georgian position in the region and prepare them for anticipated attacks by the Seljuks.

== War ==
Instigated by Georgia, the Armenian populations of Erciş and Van rose up against the Ayyubids, and the uprising soon spread to Ahlat. The Georgian army, led by Ivane Mhargrdzeli, rapidly captured huge parts of the beylik. The Georgians devastated the region and took captives. Al-Awhad, having retreated to Ahlat, was unable to counter the raid; furthermore, he could not leave the area because the rebels refused to allow him entry into the city. In response Ayyubid Sultan al-Adil I assembled and personally led a large Muslim army that included the emirs of Homs, Hama, and Baalbek as well as contingents from other Ayyubid principalities to support al-Awhad.

=== Siege of Ahlat (1209) ===
Later, Georgia laid siege to Ahlat. While moving with a small detachment to inspect the city walls, Ivane Mhargrdzeli’s horse fell into a ditch. Before his soldiers could rescue him, the people of Ahlat sallied forth from the fortress and captured the commander. This event is recounted in the same manner by the Kurdish historian Abu al-Fida, as well as by the Armenian historians Kirakos Gandzaketsi and Vardan.

== Aftermath ==
Eventually, the Thirty years' truce was signed between al-Adil and Tamar I of Georgia. Ivan was released, and subsequently, long-lasting peaceful relations were established between Georgia and the Ayyubids.
