= Surur (qiyan) =

Surur (fl. 1193), was a qiyan poet and musician, active in Ayyubid Egypt.

She was the royal slave concubine of Sultan Al-Aziz Uthman (r. 1193–1198).

Surur was described as a beautiful and accomplished singer. She was raised in slavery in Cairo, where she was instructed to read and write, study the Quran, literature and poetry, in order to become a qiyan-entertainer. During the reign of Sultan Saladin (r.1171–1193), she came to know the heir to the throne, Prince al-Aziz 'Uthman, who was attracted to Surur but did not purchase her during his fathers lifetime, since he feared his father would disapprove. During that time period, Surur and the Prince corresponded with each other. When Al-Aziz Uthman became Sultan in 1193, he purchased Surur for the Ayyubid harem, and made her his concubine. She was described as the favorite slave concubine of the Sultan. Her position was temporarily undermined when the sultan took a liking to another slave concubine, Uluf, but he returned to Surur when he tired of Uluf.

In Classical Arabic literature, she is included in Masālik al-abṣār fī mamālik al-amṣār by Ibn Fadlallah al-Umari (1301–1349), in the main work describing famous slave singers of history.
