= Al-Mansur Nasir al-Din Muhammad =

Ayyubid sultan of Egypt from 1198 to 1200

Nasir al-Din Muhammad
- Al-Mansur
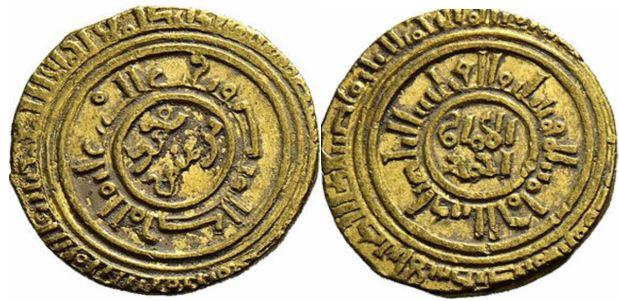
- Gold dinar struck in Alexandria in AH 595

Sultan of Egypt
- Reign: 29 November 1198 – February 1200
- Predecessor: Al-Aziz Uthman
- Successor: Al-Adil I
- Born: 1186
- Died: after 1216
- Dynasty: Ayyubid
- Father: Al-Aziz Uthman
- Religion: Islam

Al-Mansur Nasir al-Din Muhammad (Arabic: المنصور ناصر الدين محمد بن العزيز; 1186 – after 1216) was the third Ayyubid Sultan of Egypt, reigning in 1198–1200.

== Biography ==
The grandson of the Ayyubid dynasty's founder, Saladin, al-Mansur succeeded his father al-Aziz Uthman on the latter's death in 1198, at the age of twelve. A struggle subsequently ensued between different military factions as to who should serve as his atabeg al-asakir or commander in chief, and effective regent. One faction, the Salahiyya or mamluks of Saladin, wanted Saladin's brother al-Adil to take on this role, as he was viewed as able and experienced. The other faction, the Asadiyya mamluks of Saladin's uncle Asad ad-Din Shirkuh favored Saladin's eldest son, al-Afdal.

In the struggle which followed al-Afdal had the initial advantage of being based in Egypt, while al-Adil was in Syria. Al-Afdal was duly proclaimed atabeg. War broke out between them and al-Afdal attacked Damascus, but he soon lost the advantage and in February 1200 (Rabi' II 596), al-Adil entered Cairo. Within days he had removed the name of al-Mansur in the Friday prayer khutbah and replaced it with his own, thereby deposing al-Mansur.

After his deposition al-Mansur was exiled to Aleppo in Syria. There, he lived in the court of his uncle, Emir az-Zahir Ghazi, who, in 1216, placed him in the line of succession for the emirate should his own sons predecease him. Nothing further is known of al-Mansur.

Al-Mansur Nasir al-Din Muhammad Ayyubid dynasty Born: 1189 Died: after 1216
Regnal titles
Preceded by al-Aziz Uthman	Sultan of Egypt; 29 November 1198 – 1200	Succeeded by al-Adil I
