= Al-Kamil Muhammad =

Ayyubid emir of Jazira from 1247 to 1260

Muhammad
- Al-Malik al-Kamil

Emir of Jazira
- Reign: 1247–1260
- Predecessor: Al-Muzaffar Ghazi
- Successor: Emirate abolished
- Died: 1260; Mayyafariqin (modern-day Silvan, Diyarbakır, Turkey)
- Al-Malik al-Kamil Muhammad ibn al-Muzaffar Ghazi ibn al-Adil Abu Bakr
- Dynasty: Ayyubid
- Father: Al-Muzaffar Ghazi
- Religion: Sunni Islam

'Al-Malik al-Kamil Muhammad ibn al-Muzaffar Ghazi ibn al-Adil Abu Bakr was the son of al-Muzaffar Ghazi and the last Ayyubid emir (prince) of Mayyafariqin (1247–1260). He is also known as Al Kamil Muhammad II to distinguish from his uncle Al Kamil Muhammad I.

Al Kamil inherited his throne at a time when the Ayyubid Emirate of Mayyafariqin was in great danger from the Mongols. Because of its location, it was doubly at risk. To the north, the Golden Horde under Batu Khan had expanded through the Caucasus and might thrust south; to the south and east, Hulagu Khan threatened to overrun Iraq and push north. Much of Al Kamil's reign was therefore occupied with diplomatic efforts to preserve his autonomy and he sent various embassies to the Mongols to try to negotiate this.

In 1252 (650) Bayju Khan, governor of Azerbaijan and Armenia for the Golden Horde, suddenly appeared before Mayafariqin and demanded its surrender. Al Kamil Muhammad had managed to get out of the city with his family to the safety of Hasankeyf and from there he sent his brother al Ashraf Musa (Note: This brother was neither the Emir of Homs nor the Sultan of Egypt, both of whom had the same name) to petition Batu Khan for Mayyafariqin's autonomy. Batu agreed to hold off invading Mayyafariqin if Al Kamil Muhammad would go in person to the Great Khan Möngke in Karakorum to present his submission. Al Kamil agreed and in February 1253 (650) he set off bearing rich gifts. When he arrived in Karakorum he found a number of other Emirs paying their respects to the Great Khan and offering submission.

The Mongols had no intention of allowing these domains to remain even nominally independent, but their strategy involved taking Baghdad first, before moving on to other centres in due course. There was thus a few years’ respite for Mayyafariqin. Ultimately though Al Kamil's efforts were in vain. He even attempted to send troops in the Siege of Baghdad (1258) in support of the Caliph against Hulagu, but his army did not arrive in time for the siege, and had to turn back when Baghdad fell.

The Mongol armies returned in force, and started the Siege of Mayyāfāriqīn (1259–1260). There was a harsh and bitter siege with vigorous resistance to the attackers, which lasted two years. Finally Al Kamil was killed when Mayyafariqin fell to the Mongols on 7 April 1260 (23 Rabia II 658). Of the remaining Ayyubid states in Syria, Aleppo was brutally conquered, while Homs, Hama and Damascus submitted peacefully.
