= Battle of Jaffa (1197) =

Battle between the Kingdom of Jerusalem and Ayyubid dynasty

- Part of the Crusade of 1197
Date	10 September 1197
Location	Jaffa
Result	Ayyubid victory

Belligerents
Kingdom of Jerusalem	Ayyubid Dynasty

Commanders and leaders
Renauld Barlais	Al-Adil I

Strength
Unknown	Unknown

Casualties and losses
Heavy	Unknown

The Battle of Jaffa in 1197 was a military engagement between the Ayyubid army and the Crusaders outside the city of Jaffa. The Crusaders were defeated and lost Jaffa in the end.

== Background ==
In 1195, the German king, Henry VI took the cross and launched a new crusade to the holy land. This time the Germans took a route by sea, avoiding the dangerous route his father had taken during the Third Crusade. Arnold of Lübeck states that the Germans had an army of 60,000, which is indeed an exaggeration; the Germans probably had a quarter of that number. A bulk of Germans arrived early in September while the main force stopped at Cyprus to crown Aimery. The German force made a raid into Galilee; however, they were surrounded by the Ayyubids led by Al-Adil I, and only the intervention of King Henry saved them.

== Battle ==
Soon, Al-Adil left Acre and headed towards Jaffa, as the truce of 1192 had ended. The city of Jaffa was ruled by Renauld Barlais. The Crusaders, probably out of rashness, marched out of Jaffa and went to meet the Ayyubids. The Crusaders attacked the Muslims; however, the Ayyubids fought back against them and put them on the run. The Crusaders retreated from the battlefield towards Jaffa again. However, the Crusaders found the gates to be shut. The garrison closed the gates out of fear of a potential attack on the city. All the crusaders outside were subsequently massacred. The Ayyubids then laid siege to the city.

The Ayyubids assaulted the walls and forced the garrison to retreat. The defense was weak. The Crusaders were forced to retreat to the citadel, but the Ayyubids managed to breach it and kill all the defenders inside. King Henry heard the news of this attack and dispatched his army to relieve the city; however, on 10 September, in an unexpected accident, Henry fell from a window in Acre and died. At the same time, Jaffa had already fallen to the Ayyubids, and upon hearing the death of their king, the Crusader relief army withdrew.

The Ayyubids destroyed the city, took lots of spoils and captives, and left.

== Aftermath ==
The city of Jaffa remained in Muslim hands until 1204, when it was returned to the Crusaders as part of a truce agreed with Al-Adil. But despite its return, it remained deserted until 1228.

== Sources ==
- Loud, Graham (2019). The Chronicle of Arnold of Lübeck, 1st Edition.
- Marshall, Christopher (1994). Warfare in the Latin East, 1192–1291. Cambridge University Press. ISBN 9780521477420.
- Richard, Jean (1979). The Latin Kingdom Of Jerusalem, Volume A. North Holland.
- Tyerman, Christopher (2007). God's War, A New History of the Crusades. Penguin UK. ISBN 9780141904313.
