= Al-Muzaffar Ghazi =

Ayyubid emir of Jazira from 1220 to 1247

Shihab ad-Din Ghazi
- Al-Malik al-Muzaffar

Emir of Jazira
- Reign: 1220–1247
- Predecessor: Al-Ashraf Musa
- Successor: Al-Kamil Muhammad
- Died: 1247; Mayyafariqin (modern-day Silvan, Diyarbakır, Turkey)
- Al-Malik al-Muzaffar Sayf ad-Din Ghazi ibn al-Adil Abu Bakr ibn Najm ad-Din Ayyub
- Dynasty: Ayyubid
- Father: Al-Adil I
- Religion: Sunni Islam

Al-Malik al-Muzaffar Shihab ad-Din Ghazi ibn al-Adil Abu Bakr ibn Najm ad-Din Ayyub was the Ayyubid ruler of Mayyafariqin (1220–1247). Al Muzaffar Ghazi was one of the sons of the Sultan Al-Adil, who ruled minor Ayyubid states in the Middle East while their father reigned in Egypt.

== Early years ==
In 1211 (608) his father gave him Edessa and Saruj and he built a magnificent new gate for Edessa in the years which followed. In 1220-21 (617) he exchanged these cities with his brother Al-Ashraf, receiving Mayyafariqin and Akhlat instead. The brothers were so close that Al Ashraf, who had no children, also made Al Muzaffar Ghazi his viceregent and heir in his own domains.

The year after this arrangement, their father Al Adil died in the middle of a Crusader invasion of Egypt, and his eldest son, Al-Kamil succeeded him. Al Ashraf went south to support his brother in the campaign against the Crusaders, and during his absence Al Muzaffar Ghazi rose in rebellion against him. In punishment he was deprived of the succession to Al Ashraf’s domains, and his own were reduced to Mayyafariqin. It appears however that apart from this incident the brothers were otherwise close allies.

== Anatolian Campaigns ==
After this Al Muzaffar Ghazi took part loyally in a number of campaigns with his relatives against various other local rulers, extending the Ayyubid domains further into the mountainous regions of southeastern Anatolia. One of these, in 1230, was against Jalal al-Din Mangburni, the last Khwarezmshah, whose armies had taken the Ayyubid city of Akhlat. Al Muzaffar Ghazi brought forces to join a combined army of Ayyubid troops and the armies of the Seljuk ruler Ala ad-Din Kayqubad who had united against the Khwarezmian threat. At the battle of Yassıçemen on 9 August 1230 (25 Ramadan 627) the Khwarezmian forces were routed, and the Ayyubids retook Akhlat.

Another of the key Ayyubid campaigns was against the Emir Mas’ud, who held the two strategically important cities of Amida and Hasankeyf. Taking control of these was sufficiently important to warrant assembling a large combined army with forces from all of the Ayyubid emirates. Al Muzaffar’s forces from Mayyafariqin joined the Egyptian army of Al-Kamil and the Syrian army of Al-Ashraf as they marched north into Diyarbakir. They drew up before Amida on 5 October 1232 (20 Dhul Hijja 629) and after only thirteen days al-Mas’ud surrendered the city. Al Muzaffar Ghazi was ordered by Al Kamil to go with Al Ashraf to al-Mas’ud’s other possession the city of Hasankeyf, and obtain its surrender as well, taking Mas’ud with them under heavy guard. The garrison in Hasankeyf continued to defend the city however until November 1232 (Safar 630). Al Muzaffar Ghazi did not benefit from this campaign as the two conquered cities were assigned to the Sultan’s son as-Salih Ayyub.

== Mongol Threat ==
Al-Muzaffar Ghazi enjoyed a long and peaceful reign over Mayyafariqin and he built a madrasa, enlarged the mosque, and improved the fortifications. Mayyafariqin was on the outer rim of the Ayyubid domains, and during the reigns of Al Muzaffar Ghazi and his son, Al-Kamil Muhammad, who succeeded him in 1247(645), the city was under constant threat from the Seljuks and the Mongols. One of the most serious threats came in 1240-41(638) when a Mongol embassy arrived and demanded the surrender of the city. Somehow Al-Muzaffar Ghazi was able to bribe or persuade them to leave. He died in 1247 and was succeeded by his son, Al-Kamil Muhammad.
