= Antony Eastmond =

British art historian

Antony Eastmond is a British art historian specializing in Byzantine and medieval Caucasian (Georgian and Armenian) art. He is Leventis Professor of Byzantine Art, acting Executive Dean and Deputy Director at the Courtauld Institute of Art.

He obtained an MA in Byzantine art at The Courtauld and a PhD in the art of medieval Georgia. He was research fellow and reader at the art history department at the University of Warwick between 1995 and 2004.

== Publications ==
- Tamta’s World: the life and encounters of a medieval noblewoman from the Middle East to Mongolia (Cambridge: CUP, 2017)
- The Glory of Byzantium and Eastern Christendom (London: Phaidon, 2013)
- Art and Identity in thirteenth-century Byzantium. Hagia Sophia and the Empire of Trebizond [Birmingham Byzantine and Ottoman Monographs: 10] (Aldershot: Ashgate, 2004)
- Royal Imagery in Medieval Georgia (Pennsylvania State University Press, 1998)
