= Conrad of Querfurt =

German Roman Catholic bishop

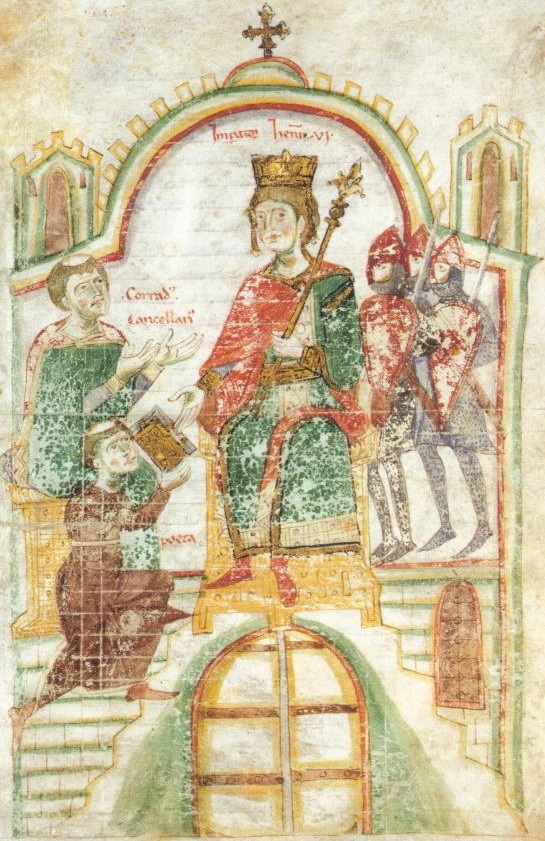
An illustration from the Liber ad honorem Augusti showing the chancellor Conrad (left, seated) and Peter of Eboli presenting the book to the Emperor Henry VI

Conrad of Querfurt (c. 1160 – 3 December 1202) was a prince of the church in the Kingdom of Germany. He was the bishop of Hildesheim (1194–1199) and the bishop of Würzburg (1198–1202), served two kings as chancellor (1194–1201) and went on the Crusade of 1197.

== Rise and origin ==
Conrad was a son of the Magdeburg Burggrave Burchard II of Querfurt and Matilda of Gleichen, a daughter of Count Lambert I zu Tonna.

Conrad attended the Cathedral School in Hildesheim and later studied with Lothar of Segni in Paris, who later became Pope Innocent III. In 1182, he received a Canon position in Magdeburg. In 1188, he became a member of the royal chapel and a Provost in Goslar. In 1190, he became Provost in Magdeburg and then in 1194 in St Mary's Cathedral in Aachen.

== Chancellor of Henry VI ==
On the Sicilian expedition of Henry VI in 1194, the Chancellor Sigelo had died and Conrad, once one of the educators of the Emperor, was appointed as his successor. The following year, Conrad was elected as Bishop of Hildesheim.

In 1196, the Emperor appointed him General Legate for Apulia, Italy and Sicily. In the enforcement of Hohenstaufen rule in Southern Italy and Sicily, he played a key role. At Conrad's instigation, Peter of Eboli wrote his Liber ad honorem Augusti, that illustrated verse epic in which represented the events and appropriately recognized the merits of Conrad.

A letter Conrad wrote describing the wonders of southern Italy, including classical ruins and volcanoes, survives because it was copied into the Chronicle of Arnold of Lübeck.

== Crusade ==
In 1197, Conrad was with Emperor Henry's marshal, Henry of Kalden, one of the leaders of the German Crusade of 1197. He influenced King Aimery of Cyprus to marry Isabella I of Jerusalem and take the crown of Jerusalem. Then during the siege of Toron, Conrad received news of the emperor's and Pope Celestine III's deaths. He broke the siege, fearing the throne was disputed because of the young age of Henry's son, Frederick.

Before leaving, Conrad was involved in the transformation of the hospital cooperative in the camp of Acre on 5 March 1198, into the Teutonic Order. Pope Innocent III gave this transformation of the Hospital cooperative his consent in 1198.

== Bishop of Würzburg ==
Conrad was elected bishop of Würzburg while he was in the Holy Land. Ordered to renounce it by the pope, he refused and was excommunicated. He then relented, renounced both dioceses and visited Rome, whereupon Pope Innocent III confirmed him as bishop of Würzburg. In the German throne dispute, he thereafter took the side of the pope's candidate, Otto of Brunswick, although he soon withdrew from politics.

Conrad was assassinated in Würzburg by Bodo von Ravensburg and Heinrich von Falkenberg on 3 December 1202. He had previously punished the Ravensburgers for murder.

Catholic Church titles
| Preceded by Berno | Bishop of Hildesheim; 1194–1199 | Succeeded by Heribert |
| Preceded by Godfrey II | Bishop of Würzburg; 1198–1202 | Succeeded by Heinrich IV |
