= Crusade of 1197 =

Crusade

- Part of the Crusades
Date	22 September 1197 – 1 July 1198
Location	The Levant
Result	Indecisive
Territorial changes	Beirut restored to the Kingdom of Jerusalem; Jaffa re-captured by the Ayyubids after the Third Crusade

Belligerents
Holy Roman Empire; Kingdom of Cyprus; Duchy of Brabant; Duchy of Austria; Landgraviate of Thuringia; County Palatine of the Rhine; Duchy of Merania; Bishopric of Passau; Bishopric of Hildesheim; Bishopric of Halberstadt; County of Gorizia	Ayyubids

Commanders and leaders
Henry VI X; Aimery of Cyprus; Henry I, Duke of Brabant; Frederick I of Austria; Herman I, Landgrave of Thuringia; Henry V of the Rhine; Berthold, Duke of Merania; Wolfger von Erla; Conrad of Querfurt; Gardolf of Halberstadt; Meinhard II, Count of Gorizia	Al-Adil I

Strength
16,000	Unknown

The Crusade of 1197, also known as the Crusade of Henry VI (German: Kreuzzug Heinrichs VI.) or the German Crusade (Deutscher Kreuzzug), was a crusade launched by the Hohenstaufen emperor Henry VI in response to the aborted attempt of his father, Emperor Frederick I, during the Third Crusade in 1189–90. Thus the military campaign is also known as the "Emperor's Crusade" (echoing the name "Kings' Crusade" given to the Third Crusade).

While his forces were already on their way to the Holy Land, Henry VI died before his departure in Messina on 28 September 1197. The emerging throne conflict between his brother Philip of Swabia and the Welf rival Otto of Brunswick made many higher-ranking crusaders return to Germany in order to protect their interests in the next imperial election. The nobles remaining on the campaign captured the Levant coast between Tyre and Tripoli before returning to Germany. The Crusade ended after the Christians captured Sidon and Beirut from the Muslims in 1198.

== Result of the Crusades ==
The Crusaders were ultimately unable to defeat Muslim forces in the last Crusade. As a result, Jerusalem remained under Muslim control.

Upon his death, Frederick's German crusading host, totaling perhaps 12,000 to 15,000 men, mostly disbanded and a much smaller contingent led by Frederick's son Duke Frederick VI of Swabia continued to the Holy Land, where they joined the Siege of Acre. The crusade ended in the 1192 Treaty of Ramla signed by Sultan Saladin and King Richard I, establishing a three-years armistice and allowing the Muslims to retain control over Jerusalem, while the Crusaders maintained Acre, Jaffa, and other key coastal cities.

Henry VI, elected King of the Romans since 1169, succeeded his father Frederick and was crowned Holy Roman Emperor by Pope Celestine III in 1191. In his struggle with the Princes to enforce his succession, the tide turned in his favour when the returning crusader King Richard was captured in Austria and only released against an oath of allegiance and an enormous ransom. In 1194 Henry could assert the inheritance claims of his wife Constance by conquering the Kingdom of Sicily. By declaring a new Crusade to reconquer Jerusalem, Henry aimed at an agreement with Pope Celestine III to acknowledge his rule over Sicily. In 1195 the armistice concluded by King Richard ended. Sultan Saladin had already died in 1193 and a conflict over his succession raged in the Ayyubid lands. In view of these favourable developments, the emperor hoped to continue the momentum of the previous campaign.

Henry VI decided to take advantage of his father's threat of force against the Byzantine Empire, affected by the rebellions in Serbia and Bulgaria as well as by Seljuk incursions. Emperor Isaac II Angelos had maintained close ties with the Sicilian usurper king Tancred of Lecce, but he was overthrown in April 1195 by his brother Alexios III Angelos. Henry took the occasion to exact tribute and had a threatening letter sent to Alexios III in order to finance the planned Crusade. Alexius immediately submitted to the tributary demands and exacted high taxes from his subjects to pay the Crusaders 5,000 pounds of gold. Henry also forged alliances with King Aimery of Cyprus and Prince Leo of Cilicia.

== Call for Crusade ==
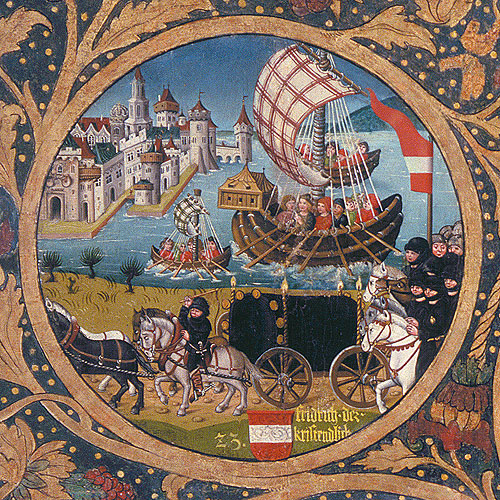
Frederick of Austria on the cruise to the Holy Land, Babenberg pedigree, Klosterneuburg Monastery, c. 1490

During the Holy Week (March) of 1195, Emperor Henry made a pledge and at the Easter celebrations in Bari publicly announced the Crusade. Henry's original plan in April 1195 was for a force of 1,500 knights and 3,000 sergeants, but this total would be exceeded. In the summer he was travelling through Germany in order to gain supporters. Despite the stalemate of the Third Crusade, a large number of the nobles responded, among them:

- Archbishop Conrad of Mainz, the Archchancellor of Germany, and Archbishop Hartwig of Bremen
- Nine Bishops, including Wolfger of Passau, Conrad of Hildesheim
- Five dukes: Henry of Brabant, Berthold of Merania, Frederick of Austria, his uncle Henry of Mödling and the emperor's cousin Hermann I, Landgrave of Thuringia
- Various counts: including Henry V of the Rhine, Meinhard II of Gorizia, Eberhard of Dörnberg, Albert of Arneburg

A large number of minor nobles also joined the Crusade and before long, according to Arnold von Lübeck in his Arnoldi Chronica Slavorum, a powerful military host of 60,000, including 7,000 German knights, was on its way. A contemporary chronicler gave a lower estimate of 4,000 knights and an unknown amount of infantry. German historian Claudia Naumann suggested in 1994 that the crusade had 16,000 men, including 3,000 knights. Bretislaus III, Duke of Bohemia had agreed to join the Crusade at the Diet in Worms in December 1195, and planned to do so, until he fell ill and died on 15 or 19 June 1197.

A force of 3,000 Saxon and Rhenish troops in 44 ships under the Count Palatine, the Duke of Brabant and the Archbishop of Bremen sailed from northern Germany in mid-May, arriving in Lisbon in mid-June. According to Roger of Howden, they stopped in Normandy and England on the way. They captured the city of Silves in the Almohad province of al-Gharb before entering the Mediterranean and razed it. Roger records that they did this because they would not hand it over to King Sancho I of Portugal, who, having captured the city with crusader assistance in 1189 had lost it again in 1191. The crusaders arrived in Messina in July or August 1197, where they merged with the emperor's troops.

In March 1197 Henry proceeded to the Kingdom of Sicily. The crusaders embarked for Acre, while the emperor first had to suppress an armed revolt in Catania. Still in Sicily, out for hunting near Fiumedinisi in August, Emperor Henry fell ill with chills, possibly from malaria. He died on September 28 before he could set sail for the Holy Land.

The combined force sailed out of Messina on 1 September and landed in Acre three weeks later.

== Campaign ==
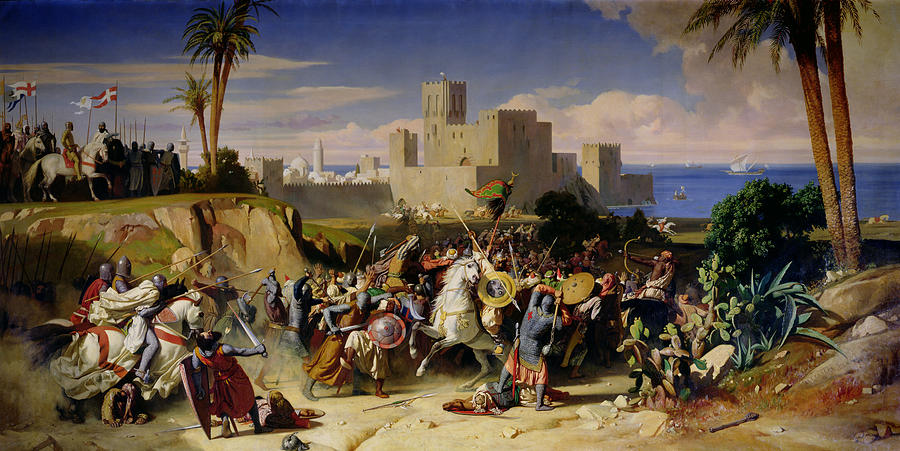
Reconquest of Beirut, Alexandre Hesse, 1842

On 22 September 1197, a substantial German army under the command of Archchancellor Conrad of Mainz and Marshal Henry of Kalden landed at Acre, where their presence aroused the displeasure of the French forces of Isabella I of Jerusalem. As the German Princes denied the authority of Henry of Kalden, they elected Duke Henry of Brabant their commander and the crusaders proceeded to Tyre, initiating a campaign to expel the Muslims from Beirut and to subject the Levant coast up to Tripoli. They captured the wealthy and important city of Sidon and on October 24 entered Beirut. With the support of the Princes, Emperor Henry's vassal King Aimery of Cyprus married Isabella I and was crowned king of Jerusalem in 1198, who had been captured as prisoner but safely escaped imprisonment alongside a few soldiers.

The crusaders continued their campaign and by reconquering the estates around Byblos Castle (Gibelet) restored the land link to the County of Tripoli. They even marched against Damascus and laid siege to Toron, when news of the emperor's death reached them. By July 1198, most of the nobles had returned home to get their fiefs confirmed by Henry's successor. The remaining crusaders concluded another armistice in June 1198 with the Ayyubid emir al-Adil I, who acknowledged the rule of King Aimery over the reconquered lands. In his capacity as King of Jerusalem, Aimery enfeoffed the Lordship of Beirut to John of Ibelin and the Lordship of Sidon to Reginald Grenier. On his way back to Germany, Archbishop Conrad of Mainz in January 1198 crowned Prince Leo of Cicilia as King of Armenia in Tarsus.

== Aftermath ==
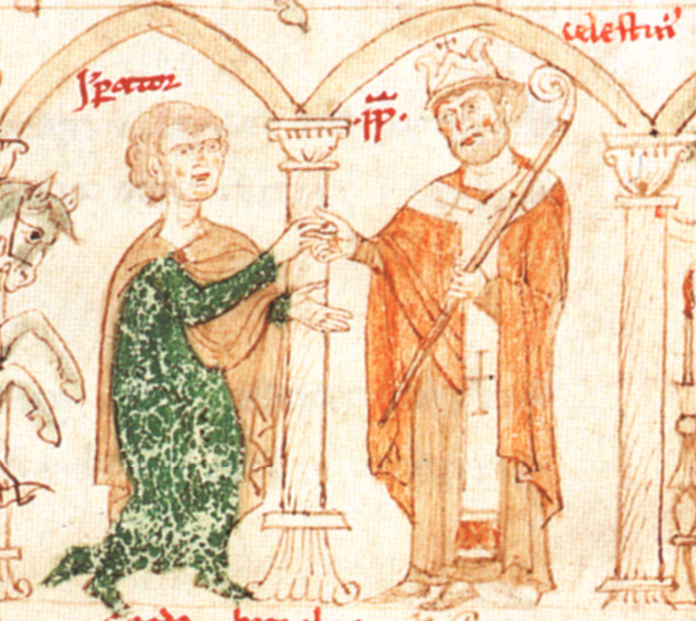
Henry and Pope Celestine, from Liber ad honorem Augusti by Peter of Eboli, 1196

Overshadowed by Henry's death, the Crusade did not realize his high-flying ambitions. Nevertheless, the weakening of the Byzantine Empire persisted and established a basis for the Fourth Crusade and the Sack of Constantinople in 1204. At the same time the originally intended reconquest of Jerusalem was abandoned, when the armistice with the Ayyubid dynasty was renewed for another six years.

The German Princes later on concentrated on their land acquisitions in the territories of the Polabian Slavs initiated by the Wendish Crusade of 1147. The Teutonic Order, established during the Siege of Acre in 1190 and elevated to a chivalric order during the German Crusade in March 1198, played an important role in the German eastward expansion to Prussia and the adjacent Baltic region in the 13th century.

== Bibliography ==
- David, Charles Wendell (1939). "Narratio de Itinere Navali Peregrinorum Hierosolymam Tendentium et Silviam Capientium, A.D. 1189". Proceedings of the American Philosophical Society. 81 (5): 591–676. JSTOR 985010.
- Juritsch, Georg (1894). Geschichte der Babenberger und ihrer Länder, 976-1246. Innsbruck: Wagnerschen Universitätsbuchhandlung.
- Loud, Graham A. (2014). "The German Crusade of 1197–1198". Crusades. 13: 143–172. doi:10.1080/28327861.2014.12220393.
- Loud, G. A. (2010). The Crusade of Frederick Barbarossa: The History of the Expedition of the Emperor Frederick and Related Texts. Farnham, Surrey: Ashgate Publishing. ISBN 9780754665755.
- Naumann, Claudia (1994). Der Kreuzzug Kaiser Heinrichs VI. Peter Lang.
- Norwich, John Julius (1997). A Short History of Byzantium. New York: Vintage Books.
- Riley-Smith, Jonathan (1990). Atlas of the Crusades. New York: Facts on File.
