= Al-Adil I =

Ayyubid sultan of Egypt from 1200 to 1218

Sayf ad-Din Abu Bakr
- Al-Malik al-Adil; Saphadin (Sword of Faith); Custodian of the Two Holy Mosques
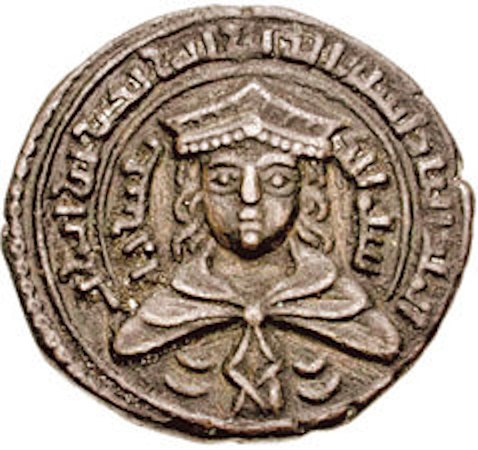
- Al Adil Sayf al Din Abu Bakr Muhammad I, as Governor in Mesopotamia, 1194-1199. Mayafariqin mint. Dated AH 591 (1194-1195 AD)

Sultan of Egypt
- Reign: 1200 – 31 August 1218
- Predecessor: Al-Mansur Nasir al-Din Muhammad
- Successor: Al-Kamil

Emir of Damascus
- Reign: 1196 – August 1218
- Predecessor: Al-Afdal ibn Salah ad-Din
- Successor: al-Mu'azzam
- Born: June 1145
- Died: 31 August 1218 (aged 73)
- Issue: Malik Al-Kamil; Dayfa Khatun; Al-Mu'azzam Isa; Al-Awhad Ayyub; Al-Muzaffar Ghazi; Al-Ashraf Musa; As-Salih Ismail
Names
- Al-Malik al-Adil Sayf ad-Din Abu-Bakr Ahmed ibn Najm ad-Din Ayyub
- Dynasty: Ayyubid
- Father: Najm ad-Din Ayyub
- Religion: Sunni Islam
- Military career
- Conflicts: Crusader raids on the Red Sea; Battle of Hattin; Siege of Jerusalem (1187); Siege of Sahyun Castle; Siege of Safed (1188); Third Crusade; Siege of Acre (1189-1191); Battle of Arsuf; Battle of Jaffa (1192); Crusade of 1197; Battle of Jaffa (1197); Siege of Toron; Fourth Crusade; Ayyubid-Georgian war (1208-1209); Fifth Crusade; Upper Egyptian Fatimid Revolts

Al-Adil I (Arabic: العادل, in full al-Malik al-Adil Sayf ad-Din Abu-Bakr Ahmed ibn Najm ad-Din Ayyub, Arabic: الملك العادل سيف الدين أبو بكر بن أيوب, "Ahmed, son of Najm ad-Din Ayyub, father of Bakr, the Just King, Sword of the Faith"; 1145 – 31 August 1218) was the fourth Sultan of Egypt and Syria, and brother of Saladin, who founded both the Sultanate of Egypt, and the Ayyubid dynasty. He was known to the Crusaders as Saphadin (derived from his laqab or honorific title Sayf ad-Din, meaning "Sword of Faith"), a name by which he is still known in the Western world. A gifted and effective administrator and organizer, Al-Adil provided crucial military and civilian support for the great campaigns of Saladin (an early example of a great minister of war). He was also a capable general and strategist in his own right, and was instrumental in the transformation of the decayed Fatimid Caliphate of Cairo into the Ayyubid Sultanate of Egypt.

== Early life ==
Al-Adil was a son of Najm ad-Din Ayyub, he was member of Kurdish Ayyubid family and a younger brother of Saladin. He was born in June 1145, possibly in Damascus. He first achieved distinction as an officer in Nur ad-Din Zengi's army during his uncle Shirkuh's third and final campaign in Egypt (1168–1169); following Nur ad-Din's death in 1174, Al-Adil governed Egypt on behalf of his brother Saladin and mobilized that country's vast resources in support of his brother's campaigns in Syria and his war against the Crusaders (1175–1183). He was governor of Aleppo (1183–1186) but returned to administer Egypt during the Third Crusade (1186–1192); as governor of Saladin's northern provinces (1192–1193), he suppressed the revolt of 'Izz Al-Din of Mosul following Saladin's death (March 1193). On Saladin's death, he was the governor of Damascus.

In 1191, King Richard I of England suggested to Al-Adil a marriage with his younger sister Joan, then his niece Eleanor, but both were in vain, as Al-Adil showed no interest in Christianity.

== Struggle for succession of Saladin ==
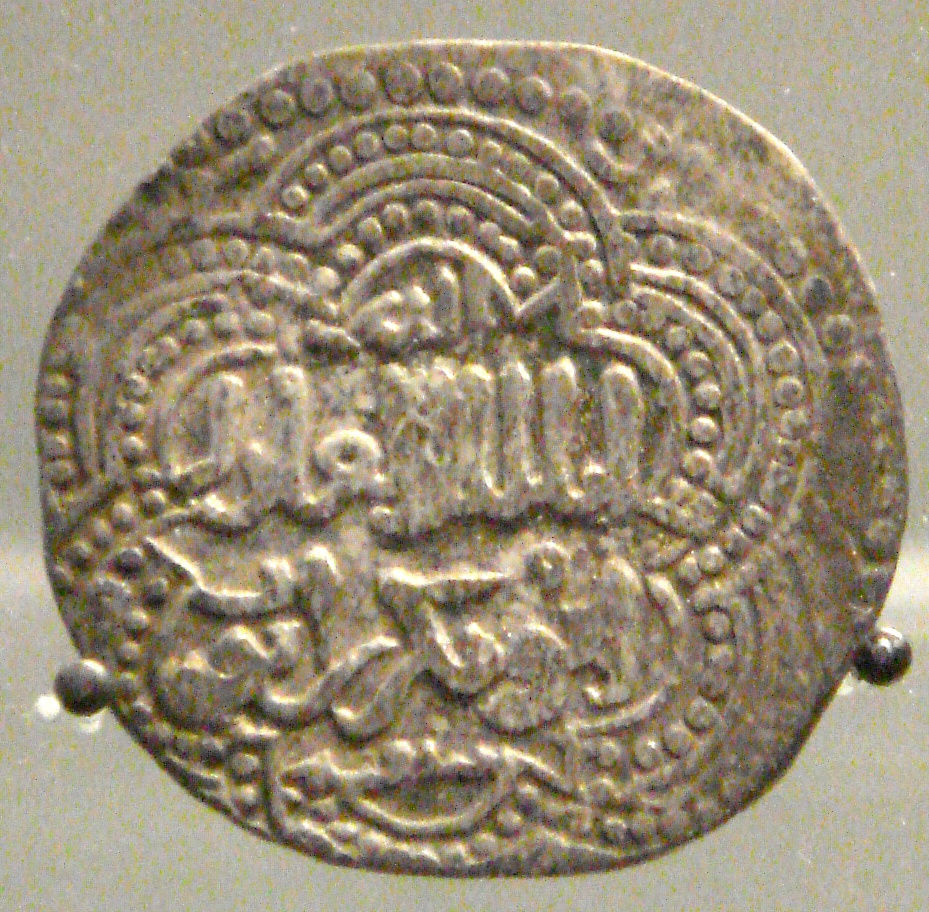
A coin issued in Damascus in the name of Sultan Al-Adil in 1201

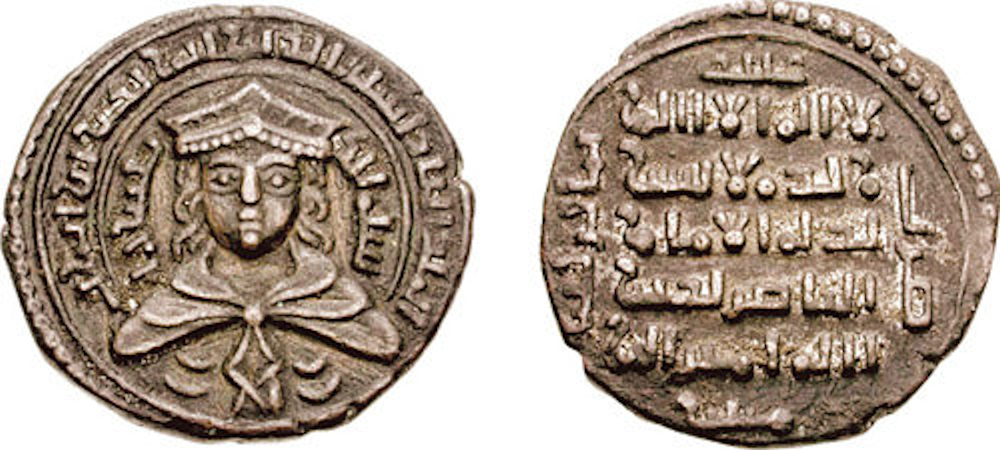
Coinage of Al Adil Sayf al Din Abu Bakr Muhammad I. As Governor in Mesopotamia (1194–1199). Mayyafariqin mint. Dated AH 591 (1194-1195 AD).

The key question in the ruling Ayyubid family following the death of Saladin was whether power would remain with Saladin's own sons, or be distributed more widely among its various branches, or, indeed, be concentrated in the hands of al-Adil himself. Saladin had required all the Amirs to swear loyalty to his son al-Afdal Ali, but after his death some of his other sons would not accept al-Afdal's overlordship. In the disputes which followed al-Adil often found himself in the position of honest broker between al-Afdal Ali and his brother al-Aziz Uthman, trying to keep the peace. Eventually however al-Adil concluded that al-Afdal Ali was simply unfit to rule, and he supported al-Aziz Uthman to become Sultan in his place, forcing his brother into exile. Al-Aziz Uthman's death in 1198 following a riding accident reopened the dynastic struggles once again. Al-Afdal Ali was invited back to Egypt to act as regent to al-Aziz Uthman's twelve-year-old successor, al-Mansur Mohammed. From this power base he joined forces with his brother az-Zahir Ghazi to try and drive al-Adil out of Damascus, which they besieged. Al-Adil, skilfully played his nephews off against each other, and suborned the vassals of both from their allegiance. The arrival of al-Khamil, al-Adil's son, at Damascus with reinforcements and continuing quarrels led to the ending of the siege in December 1199. Al-Afdal retreated to Egypt, but his uncle pursued him and defeated his army at Bilbeis. Fleeing to Cairo, al-Afdal sued for peace on any terms he could get from al-Adil; stripped of Egypt he was promised the cities of Samosata and Mayyafaraqin. On 17 February 1200 al-Adil proclaimed himself 'sultan'. Al-Afdal was refused control of Mayyafaraqin by another of al-Adil's sons, al-Auhad. Al-Afdal once again allied with az-Zahir and the two brothers once more besieged Damascus. However, dissension again broke out between them, with al-Afdal eventually losing the will to continue fighting. Al-Adil confirmed al-Afdal's rule over Samosata, Saruj and a number of other towns. Az-Zahir admitted his uncle's suzerainty in the Spring of 1202, and al-Adil had succeeded in exerting his authority over all the Ayyubid dominions.

== Rule ==
After his victory, he ruled wisely and well over both Egypt and Syria for nearly two decades, promoting trade and good relations with the Crusader states (1200–1217). For much of his reign however the effective ruler of Egypt was his son Al-Kamil.

The reign of al Adil was generally more one of consolidation than of expansion. He was in his late fifties by the time he consolidated his power, and by that time had been almost constantly at war for two decades. His first concern was to rebuild his treasury, which had been left almost empty by his brother's empire-building, the wars with the Crusaders and the struggles within the Ayyubid dynasty itself. Al-Adil introduced reforms both to the currency and to the taxation system. The effectiveness of his measures can be judged from the relatively rapid recovery Egypt made from an earthquake in 1200 (597) and the low flooding of the Nile between 1199 and 1202 (595–98). The resulting drought and famine were serious threats, but by a range of measures including sending his soldiers out to work the land, al-Adil ensured continued social and political stability as well as economic recovery.

Avoiding a new crusade was the second main concern of al-Adil's reign, and to this end he encouraged trade with European merchants, calculating that if the trading cities of the Mediterranean had a stake in peaceful trade they would be less inclined to support a new Crusade. He was not entirely successful in this, and there were Frankish naval raids on Rosetta in 1204 (600) and Damietta in 1211 (607).

His third concern was to maintain hegemony within the Ayyubid domains without resort to force. He proved to be a skilled diplomat in this respect and managed to avoid any confrontations after 1201. Of particular importance was the marriage of his daughter Dayfa Khatun to Saladin's son Az-Zahir Ghazi of Aleppo in 1212, which marked the end of the rivalry between the two branches of the family. Al-Adil also undertook a major programme of refortification throughout his domains, and the massive citadel of Damascus was one of his most notable achievements in this respect.

Al-Adil's territorial ambitions were focused far away from the main centres of Ayyubid rule, in southern Anatolia and northern Mesopotamia. He succeeded over time in bringing much of the old Zengid dominions, apart from Mosul and Sinjar, under his control, as well as the region around Lake Van. He took Ahlat in 1207 and brought to an end the rule of the Ahlatshahs.

== Death and legacy ==
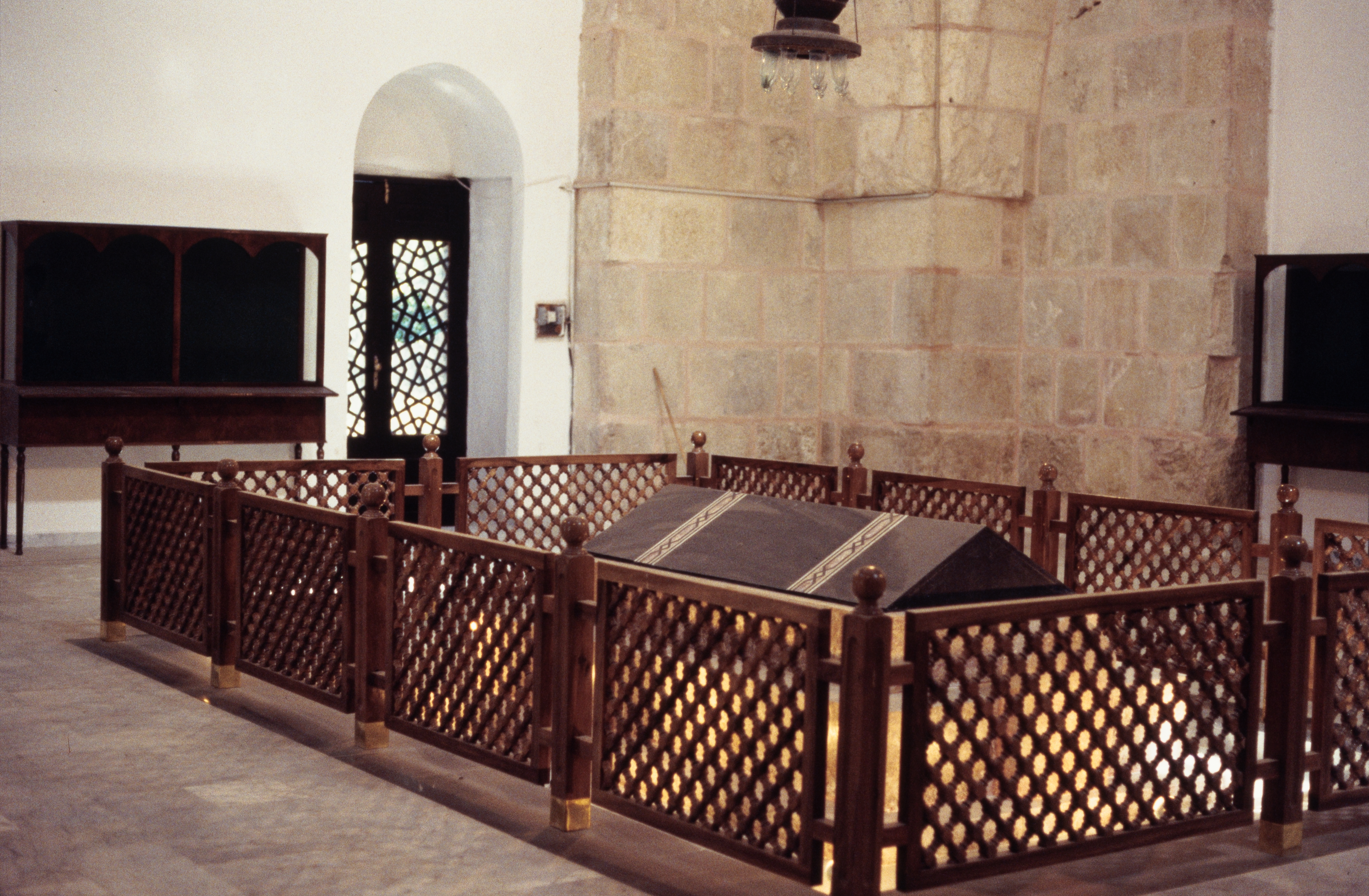
Al-Adil I tomb in Al-Adiliyah Madrasa in Damascus

One of the main objects of al-Adil's foreign policy was to avoid provoking the launching of a new Crusade. However, in September 1217 (Jumada II 612) a new crusader army disembarked at Acre. Al-Adil was totally unprepared for this assault and despite being seventy-two years of age he hurriedly took his forces into Palestine to engage with them. The campaigns in Palestine did not bring him any notable success however, and in August 1218 (Jumada 1 615) he received the shocking news that a second Crusader force had landed in Egypt and were attacking Damietta. He fell ill and died while on campaign (August 1218) and was succeeded by his son Malik Al-Kamil.

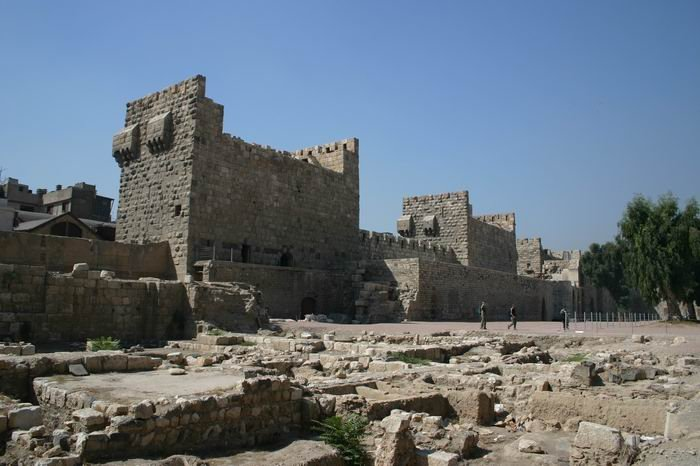
The present Citadel of Damascus was built under al-Adil I

Al Adil's rule was decisive in determining the shape of the Ayyubid realm for many years to come. After him, the succession in Egypt and to the coveted title of Sultan remained in the eldest male line of his successors. His descendants also controlled the critical border fortress of Mayyafariqin in the far northeast of the Ayyubid realm. Elsewhere, Saladin's descendants retained Aleppo, and the family of Al-Adil's other brother Nur ad-Din Shahanshah held Baalbek and Hama. Homs was held by the descendants of Al-Adil's uncle Shirkuh. Damascus became the main focus of rivalry between different branches of the family, changing hands a number of times before Ayyubid rule came to an end.

== Family ==
Al-Adil had 16 sons, including Malik Al-Kamil, Malik Al-Ashraf Musa, Al-Awhad Ayyub, Al-Mu'azzam Isa, and Al-Muzaffar Ghazi, and several daughters, including Dayfa Khatun, Malika Khatun, Zahra Khatun, Ghaziya Khatun and Malika Adliya Ghaziya Khatun.

== See also ==
- List of rulers of Egypt
- Thirty Years' Truce

Al-Adil I Ayyubid dynasty Born: June 1145 Died: August 1218
Regnal titles
Preceded by Al-Afdal ibn Salah ad-Din	Emir of Damascus; 1196 – August 1218	Succeeded by al-Mu'azzam
Preceded by al-Mansur Nasir al-Din Muhammad	Sultan of Egypt; 1200 – August 1218	Succeeded by al-Kamil
