= Al-Awhad Ayyub =

Ayyubid emir of Jazira from 1200 to 1210

Najm ad-Din Ayyub
- Al-Malik al-Awhad Arman-šāh
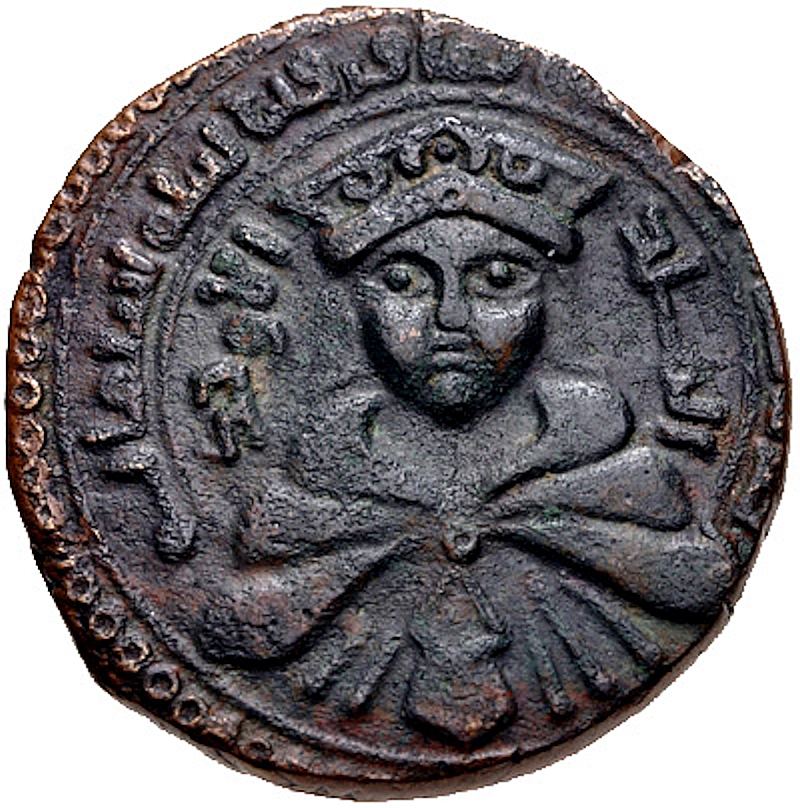
- Al-Awhad Najm al-Din Ayyub in AH 600 (AD 1194-5). Mayyafariqin mint

Emir of Jazira
- Reign: 1200–1210
- Predecessor: Emirate established
- Successor: Al-Ashraf Musa
- Died: 1210
- Spouse: Tamta
Names
- Al-Malik al-Awhad Najm ad-Din Ayyub ibn al-Adil Abu Bakr ibn Najm ad-Din Ayyub
- Dynasty: Ayyubid
- Father: Al-Adil I
- Religion: Sunni Islam

Al-Malik al-Awhad Najm ad-Din Ayyub ibn al-Adil Abu Bakr ibn Najm ad-Din Ayyub (died 1210) was the third Ayyubid emir (prince) of the Diyar Bakr emirate, centered in Mayyafariqin, between 1200 and 1210 CE. He was the fourth eldest son of Sultan al-Adil I of Egypt (r. 1200–1218).

== Emir of Mayyafariqin ==
Following the ousting of al-Afdal from Damascus, al-Adil divided much of the reunited Ayyubid empire among his sons. The empire's northernmost possessions, centered on Mayyafariqin, were allotted to al-Awhad. Al-Afdal and al-Adil later concluded an agreement whereby al-Awhad would transfer control of Mayyafariqin to al-Afdal. However, al-Awhad declined to give up part of his principality and al-Adil refused to intervene. It is likely that al-Adil himself ordered al-Awhad to refuse the transfer due to Mayyafariqin's strategic importance as a border area fortress. Consequently, al-Afdal joined forces with his brother az-Zahir Ghazi of Aleppo, who disputed al-Adil's rule. In an attempt to gain the support of Izz al-Din Usama, the Ayyubid emir of Ajloun, the brothers' approach backfired when Izz al-Din informed al-Adil of their conspiracy. A short-lived armed struggle between the two Ayyubid factions in Syria followed.

== Conquest of Armenia ==
Al-Awhad was central to al-Adil's efforts to conquer the territories of Armenia and al-Jazira. Al-Awhad joined an Ayyubid army under the leadership of his brother al-Ashraf of Harran to relieve the Zengid emir of Sinjar, Qutb al-Din, from an assault by his cousin Nur ad-Din Arslan Shah I of Mosul, the chief Zengid emir. In April 1204 the Ayyubid coalition swiftly defeated Nur ad-Din's forces at Nusaybin, chasing them back to Mosul where they attacked several of the surrounding villages. By September the Ayyubids had established a peace with Nur ad-Din.

In 1207, in a bid to control the main road between Diyar Bakr and eastern Anatolia, al-Awhad launched an offensive against the Armenian city of Akhlat which was under the control of Balaban. He was able to capture a number of smaller fortresses, namely Mush and the surrounding villages, during his campaign, but ultimately failed to conquer Akhlat. In 1208 al-Adil sent al-Awhad reinforcements for a second attempt to capture the city. Al-Awhad defeated Balaban near Akhlat and captured the lands around it. After retreating to the city's fortress, Balaban was preparing Akhlat for the impending Ayyubid assault. He subsequently formed an alliance with Tughril Shah, the Seljuk emir of Erzerum. Together they routed al-Awhad's army, but Tughril soon turned on Balaban and assassinated him. Tughril subsequently attempted to enter Akhlat, but was rejected by the population who now sent emissaries inviting al-Awhad to take over the city. Facing no resistance, al-Awhad took possession of Akhlat later that year. Afterward, his army proceeded to conquer the strategic fortresses of Manzikert, Arjish and Van, all situated north of Lake Van in Armenian territory.

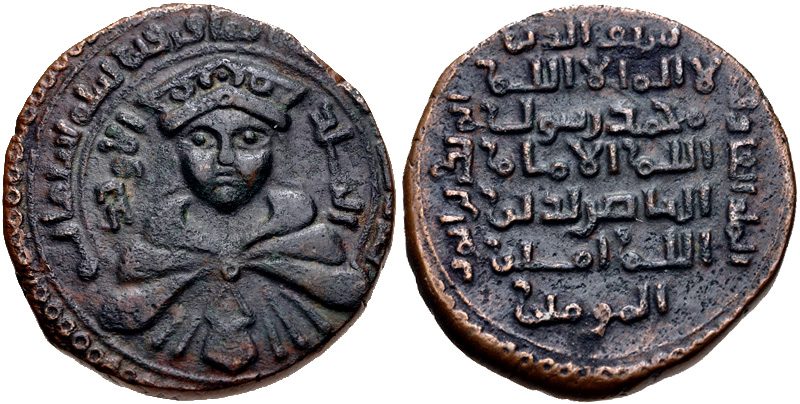
Coinage of Al-Awhad Najm al-Din Ayyub. AH 596-607 AD 1200–1210. Mayyafariqin mint. Dated AH 600 (AD 1194–5)

Before Ayyubid control could be solidified, al-Awhad faced revolts in Arjish and Van. As he attempted to quash those insurrections, Akhlat joined the rebellion later in 1208. Upon the orders of al-Adid, al-Ashraf led an army of roughly 1,000 troops to support al-Awhad and the Ayyubids managed to put down the revolt in Akhlat, resulting in a heavy loss of life. By 1209 the Christian kingdom of Georgia challenged Ayyubid rule in eastern Anatolia. In response al-Adil assembled and personally led an army that included the emirs of Homs, Hama and Baalbek as well as contingents from other Ayyubid principalities to back al-Awhad and al-Ashraf. The Georgians withdrew from the area when the Ayyubids' approached Akhlat. As the Georgians returned to their kingdom, al-Awhad captured their general Ivane Mkhargrdzeli on the outskirts of Akhlat. Using Ivane as a bargaining chip, al-Awhad agreed to release him in return for 30 years of peace with Georgia, thus ending the immediate Georgian threat to the Ayyubids.

from 1207 onwards, the Ayyubid rulers of Khilat styled themselves as Arman-Shah or Shahi-Arman, "king of Armenia".

== Bibliography ==
- Humphreys, Stephen (1977). From Saladin to the Mongols: The Ayyubids of Damascus, 1193-1260. SUNY Press. ISBN 978-0-87395-263-7.
- Ibn al-Athir (2007). D.S. Richards (ed.). The Chronicle of Ibn al-Athir for the Crusading Period from al-Kamil fi'l-ta'rikh, Part 2. Great Britain: Ashgate Publishing Ltd. ISBN 978-0-7546-4078-3.
