= Thirty Years' Truce =

1210 truce between Georgia and the Ayyubids

Thirty Years' Truce
1210
The Truce of Khlat was made between the Kingdom of Georgia and the Ayyubid Sultanate.

The Thirty Years' Truce or Truce of Khlat was a truce agreed to by Queen Tamar of Georgia and Al-Adil I, an Ayyubid Sultan of Egypt in October, 1210.

By 1208, the Kingdom of Georgia challenged Ayyubid rule in eastern Anatolia and besieged Khlat. In response Ayyubid Sultan al-Adil I assembled and personally led large Muslim army that included the emirs of Homs, Hama, and Baalbek as well as contingents from other Ayyubid principalities to support al-Awhad. During the siege, Georgian general Ivane Mkhargrdzeli accidentally fell into the hands of the al-Awhad on the outskirts of Khlat and was released only after the Georgians agreed to a thirty-year truce on following terms:

- Georgia had to pay ransom of 100,000 dinars;
- Georgia had to cede 27 castles;
- Georgia had to liberate 5000 muslim prisoners;
- Ivane had to promise the hand of his daughter Tamta to his captor.

The truce ended the Georgian menace to Ayyubid Armenia. Georgia refrained from hostilities against enemy with whom Tamar the Great had signed a treaty, and the border or Christian-Muslim world was established. As the result Georgia abandoned its ambitions west of the river Araxes.
