= Al-Aziz Uthman =

Ayyubid sultan of Egypt from 1193 to 1198

Al-Aziz Uthman العزيز عثمان
- Al-Malik Al-Aziz
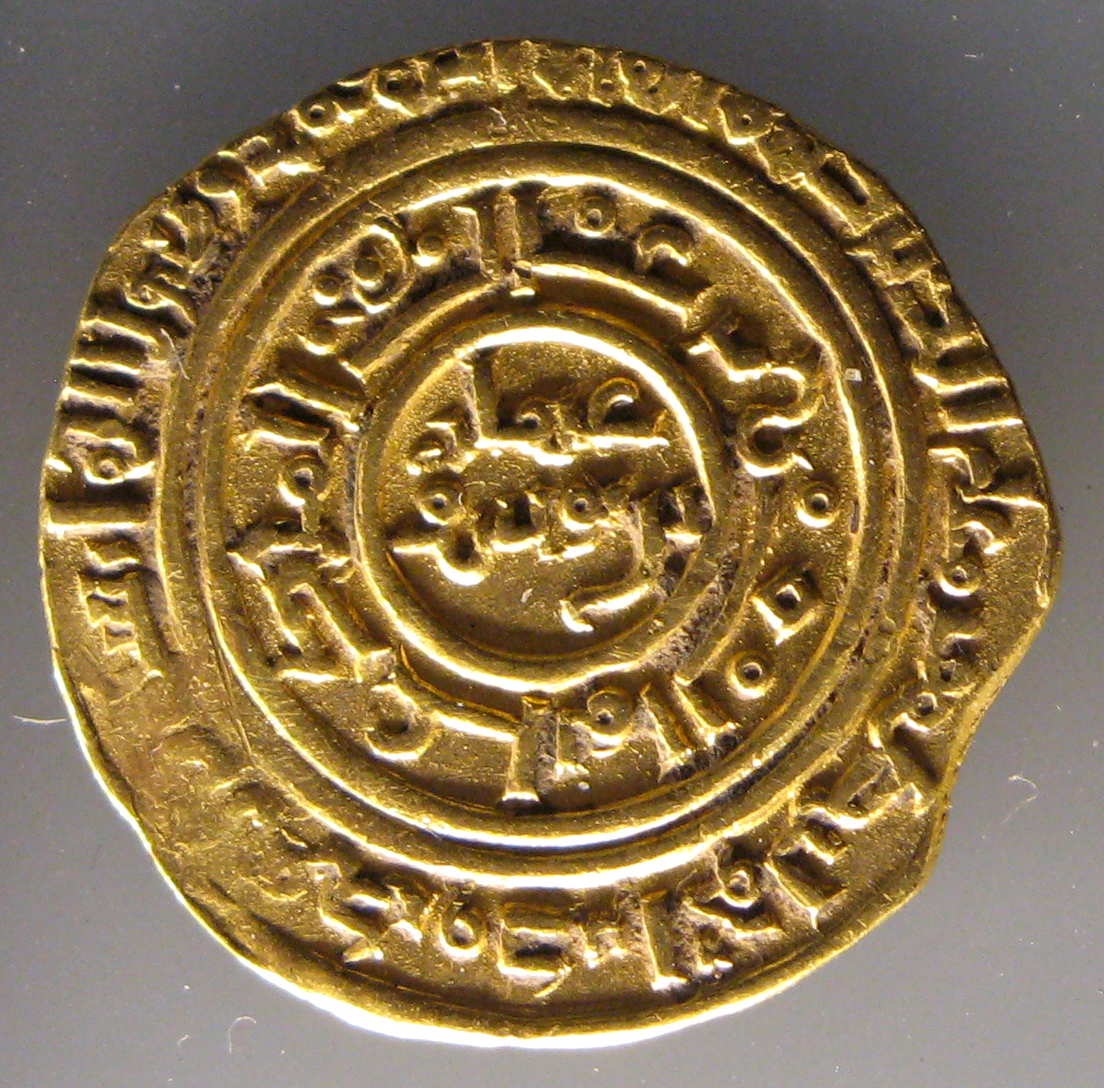

Sultan of Egypt
- Reign: 4 March 1193 – 29 November 1198
- Predecessor: Saladin
- Successor: Al-Mansur Nasir al-Din Muhammad
- Born: 1171
- Died: 29 November 1198 (aged 27); Egypt
- Consort: Surur
- Issue: Al-Mansur Nasir al-Din Muhammad
Names
- Al-Malik Al-Aziz Uthman Ibn Salah Ad-Din Yusuf
- Dynasty: Ayyubid
- Father: Saladin
- Religion: Sunni Islam

Al-Malik Al-Aziz Uthman ibn Salah Ad-Din Yusuf (Arabic: العزيز عثمان بن صلاح الدين يوسف; 1171 – 29 November 1198) was the second Ayyubid Sultan of Egypt. He was the second son of Saladin.

== Life ==
Before his death, Saladin had divided his dominions amongst his kin: Al-Afdal received Palestine and Syria, al-Aziz was made ruler of Egypt, Al-Zahir received Aleppo, Al-Adil I received Karak and Shawbak, and Turan-Shah retained Yemen. Conflict soon broke out between them with Al-Adil becoming the undisputed ruler of Syria, Upper Mesopotamia, Egypt, and Yemen.

Despite Al-Aziz having specifically inherited suzerainty over the whole Ayyubid empire, soon he had to face revolts by the Zengid emirs of Mosul and by the Artuqids in southern Iraq. When Al-Afdal expelled all the ministers left by his father to support him, they came to Egypt, asking Al-Aziz to reconquer Syria. In 1194, Al-Aziz besieged Damascus. Al-Afdal asked for help from Saladin's brother, Al-Adil I, who met Al-Aziz and managed to bring about a reconciliation.

In 1195, Al-Aziz again attacked Syria, but Al-Afdal was able to persuade some of the Emirs of Al-Aziz's army to desert. Later Al-Adil allied with al-Aziz against Al-Afdal, who was besieged and captured in Damascus on 3 July 1196. Al-Afdal was exiled to Salkhad, while Al-Aziz was proclaimed supreme overlord of the Ayyubid Empire. However, most of the effective power was in the hands of Al-Adil I, who installed himself in Damascus.

During his reign, Al-Aziz tried to demolish the Great Pyramids of Giza, Egypt, but had to give up because the task was too big. He succeeded in damaging Menkaure's Pyramid. Al-Aziz also played an important role in the history of the building enterprises and construction at Banias and Subaybah. He died in a hunting accident in late 1198. He was interred in the tomb of his elder brother Al-Mu'azzam.

== See also ==
- List of rulers of Egypt

== Notes ==
Al-Aziz Uthman Ayyubid dynasty Born: 1171 Died: 29 November 1198
Regnal titles
Preceded by Saladin	Sultan of Egypt; 1193 – 29 November 1198	Succeeded by Al-Mansur Muhammad
