= Al-Afdal ibn Salah ad-Din =

Ayyubid emir of Damascus from 1193 to 1196

Emir of Damascus
- Reign: 4 March 1193 – 1196
- Predecessor: Saladin
- Successor: Al-Adil I
- Born: c. 1169; Damascus
- Died: 1225
Names
- al-Malik al-Afḍal ʿAlī ibn Ṣalāḥ al-Dīn الملك الأفضل علي بن صلاح الدين
- Dynasty: Ayyubid
- Father: Saladin
- Religion: Sunni Islam

Al-Malik al-Afḍal ʿAlī ibn Ṣalāḥ al-Dīn (Arabic: الملك الأفضل علي بن صلاح الدين, lit. 'The Most Superior King, Ali, son of Salah ad-Din'; c. 1169 – 1225, generally known as al-Afdal (Arabic: الأفضل), was one of seventeen sons of Saladin, Sultan of Egypt and Syria. He succeeded his father as the second Ayyubid ruler of Damascus. His reign was marked by repeated armed conflict with other prominent members of his family.

== Biography ==
=== Early life ===
Al-Afdal was one of the commanders at the Battle of Arsuf, where Saladin was defeated by Richard I of England and the forces of the Third Crusade. When Saladin died in 1193, al-Afdal inherited Damascus, Egypt was claimed by his brother al-Aziz, where he was already installed as governor, and Aleppo by another brother az-Zahir. As his father was dying, al-Afdal summoned all the emirs at Damascus to swear allegiance to him. In theory, he was the head of the Ayyubid dynasty, but in practice had no authority over his siblings, and soon proved that he had little ability as a ruler.

=== Conflict within the Ayyubid dynasty and ultimate loss of power ===
In May 1194 al-Afdal was attacked by al-Aziz at his capital Damascus. Their uncle al-Adil marched down from the Jazira and brokered a peace. This did not last even a year year and al-Aziz marched again on Damascus, but was driven back to Egypt by al-Afdal. By 1196, al-Adil had lost patience with al-Afdal's incompetence and allied himself with al-Aziz. Al-Adil then annexed Damascus, forcing al-Afdal to retire to the town of Salkhad, in the Hauran. In November 1198, al-Aziz died after falling from a horse while hunting. Fearing the ambition of al-Adil, the emirs of Egypt called al-Afdal from retirement to be regent for al-Aziz's young son, al-Mansur Muhammad. In 1199, al-Afdal and his other brother az-Zahir besieged their uncle in Damascus. Al-Adil skillfully played his nephews off against each other, and suborned the vassals of both from their allegiance. The arrival of al-Kamil, al-Adil's son, at Damascus with reinforcements and continuing quarrels led to the ending of the siege in December 1199. Al-Afdal retreated to Egypt, but his uncle pursued him and defeated his army at Bilbeis. Fleeing to Cairo, al-Afdal sued for peace on any terms he could get from al-Adil; stripped of Egypt, he was promised the cities of Samosata and Mayyafaraqin. On the 17th of February 1200 al-Adil proclaimed himself sultan. Al-Afdal was refused control of Mayyafaraqin by another of al-Adil's sons, al-Auhad. He once again allied with az-Zahir and the brothers once more besieged Damascus. However, dissension again broke out between them, with al-Afdal eventually losing the will to continue fighting. Al-Adil confirmed al-Afdal's rule over Samosata, Saruj and a number of other towns. Az-Zahir admitted his uncle's suzerainty in the Spring of 1202, and al-Adil had succeeded in exerting his authority over all the Ayyubid dominions.

=== Last attempt at regaining power ===
In 1218, following the death of az-Zahir, al-Afdal interrupted his seclusion at Samosata to make his last bid for power. He allied himself with Kaykaus I the Seljuk Sultan, with the intention of taking the city of Aleppo. True to form, after taking two towns he soon quarreled with his ally and took no further part in the fighting, Kaykaus being subsequently defeated. Al-Afdal died in 1225.

== Bibliography ==
- Humphreys, R. S. (1997) From Saladin to the Mongols: The Ayyubids of Damascus, 1193-1260, SUNY Press
- Runciman, Steven (1987) [1954]. A History of the Crusades, Volume III: The Kingdom of Acre and the Later Crusades. Vol. 3. Cambridge: Cambridge University Press.

Al-Afdal ibn Salah ad-Din Ayyubid dynasty Born: 1169 Died: 1225
Regnal titles
Preceded by Salah ad-Din Yusuf	Emir of Damascus; 4 March 1193 – 1196	Succeeded by Al-Adil I
