= Ivane Akhaltsikheli =

Georgian commander and courtier

Amirtamira of Kars
- In office 1206–1225

Personal details
- Born: Unknown
- Died: 1225 Garni
- Children: David Akhaltsikheli

Military service
- Battles/wars: Battle of Shamkor; Battle of Basiani; Siege of Kars (1206–1207); Battle of Garni †

Ivane Akhaltiskheli (Georgian: ივანე ახალციხელი) (died 1226) was a Georgian military commander, and a Court official of the Kingdom of Georgia. He was member of the House of Toreli-Akhaltsikheli, and the brother of Shalva Akhaltsikheli.

== Biography ==
Local Meskhetian forces under Ivane Akhaltsikheli, Shalva Akhaltsikheli and Sargis Tmogveli had been blockading Kars intermittently for some years, and Queen Tamar decided to send a special army under David Soslan and brothers Zakaria and Ivane Mkhargrdzelis to smash the resistance.

In 1206–1207, the Georgians besieged the fortress of Kars and pressed hard on those within. The emir of Kars asked the Shah-Armens for help, but its rulers did not provide any assistance. After the long siege, the emir of Kars, seeing that no assistance was coming, decided to hand over his domain to Georgians in exchange for a large amount of money and a fiefdom for him. Tamar appointed Ivane Akhaltsikheli as the ruler of Kars.

Along with his brother Ivane participated in Battle of Basiani (1202) and battle of Garni (1225), where he was killed while retreating to the mountains.

== Bibliography ==
- Asatiani, Nodar; Janelidze, Otar (2009). History of Georgia: From Ancient Times to the Present Day. Publishing House Petite. ISBN 9789941906367.
- Ibn al-Athīr, Izz ad-Dīn (2010). Donald S. Richards (ed.). The Chronicle of Ibn al-Athīr for the Crusading Period from al-Kāmil fī'l-ta'rīkh. Part 3 - The Years 589-629/1193-1231: The Ayyubids after Saladin and the Mongol Menace. Ashgate. ISBN 9780754669524.
- Allen, William (2023). A History of the Georgian People: From the Beginning Down to the Russian Conquest in the Nineteenth Century. Taylor & Francis. ISBN 9781000855302.
