= Battle of Garni =

Battle in 1225

- Part of Jalal al-Din's invasions of Georgia
Date	August 1225
Location	Garni, Kingdom of Georgia 40°07′N 44°43′E
Result	Khwarazmian victory

Belligerents
Kingdom of Georgia	Khwarezmian Empire

Commanders and leaders
Ivane Mkhargrdzeli (AWOL); Shalva Akhaltiskheli (executed); Ivane Akhaltsikheli †	Jalal al-Din Mangburni

Strength
60,000–70,000 deployed 17,000–20,000 engaged	60,000 -200,000

Casualties and losses
4,000–20,000 killed	Unknown
- Location of Garni in Armenia with present-day administrative borders Battle of Garni (Armenia)

The Battle of Garni (Georgian: გარნისის ბრძოლა, Armenian: Գառնիի ճակատամարտ) was fought in 1225 near Garni, in modern day Armenia, then part of the Kingdom of Georgia. The invading Khwarazmian Empire was led by Jalal al-Din Mangburni, its last sultan, who had been driven from his realm by the Mongol Empire and was trying to recapture lost territories. The battle ended with a Khwarezmid victory and is marked as a disastrous event in Georgian history due to betrayal. As a result, the royal court of Georgian Queen Rusudan (1223–1245) moved to Kutaisi and the country was exposed to subsequent looting during the Mongol invasions of Georgia.

== Prelude ==
Jalal al-Din Mangburni sent an abasement letter to Queen Rusudan demanding subordination of Georgia under his rule. At the same time, he assembled a huge military force, asking for troops from his allies and nobles across the empire. The purpose was to completely crush the Kingdom of Georgia and take all its dominions successfully ceding its existence. The Georgian court and leadership had notes and reports about a possible intervention but did not consider it necessary to take measures since that threat was not taken seriously. Instead, the nobility replied by sending a letter that reminded Jalal al-Din of his crushing defeat against the Mongols, while having no idea how strong his empire already was by then. In 1225, a large Khwarezmid army crossed the Georgian border and soon both parties met on the battlefield.

== Strength ==
Under the command of Queen Rusudan, messengers were sent out to all regions of the Kingdom of Georgia in order to gather troops. During that period the kingdom had the potential to raise around 100,000 men in total including mercenaries. However the Georgians had reserved some forces for security reasons, thus leaving around 60–70,000 men for battle. The strength of the invading army far exceeded that of Rusudan's forces. According to the Georgian chronicler Jamtaaghmtsereli, the army of Jalal ad-Din was 140,000 men strong. Alexander Mikaberidze say that Jalal al-Din was the head of an army of 200,000 Turkmen and various mercenaries. Richard G. Hovanissian offers a more modest estimate of 60,000.

== Disposal ==
A Georgian vanguard of around 20,000 men led by the Akhaltsikheli brothers - Shalva Akhaltiskheli and Ivane Akhaltsikheli rushed towards the Khwarazmid forces to secure areal dominance. While the Khwarazmians were disposed on lower ground and flat lands, the Georgian who had arrived earlier were deployed wisely on top of surrounding plateaus and established a strategic advantage for the arriving main army. General Mkhargrdzeli with his more than 50,000 warriors arrived in time and initially kept himself in the background being expected by the other commanders to react on any attack against his vanguard while remaining unnoticed by the enemy.

== Battle ==
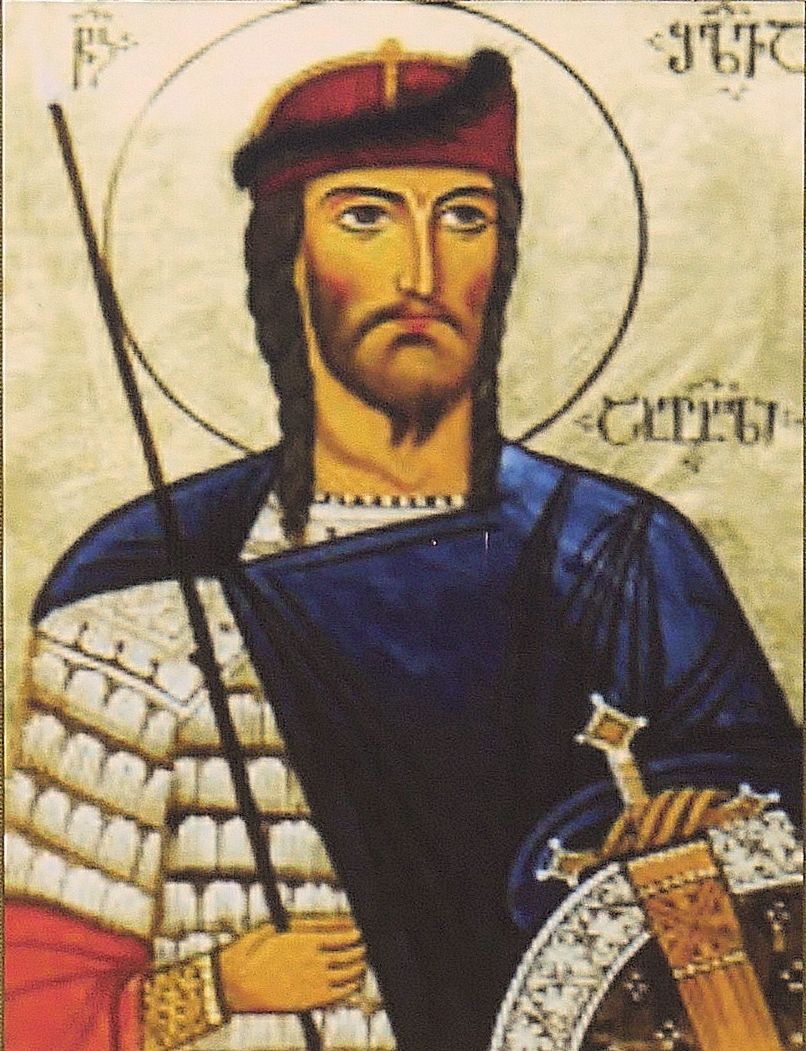
Shalva Akhaltsikheli fought on the Georgian side at the Battle of Garni.

The battle began with Jalal ad-Din's left wing attacking the Georgian vanguard and it did not take long for his main forces to be ordered into fight. By that time, Shalva of Akhaltsikhe and Ivane Akhaltsikheli had already sent several messengers to the commander of the main Georgian army asking him to strike the Khwarezmid rear as the vanguard was able to stabilize the front lines. Despite the crucial advantage of the terrain, relief for the vanguard became critically necessary. However, Mkhargrdzeli's forces remained motionless. It is believed that personal enmity between Mkhargrdzeli and the Akhaltsikheli brothers played a key role in his refusal to commit his troops. As a result, the Georgian vanguard, left without reinforcement, eventually broke apart and was completely overrun. Mkhargrdzeli then ordered a full retreat, abandoning the battlefield and leaving Shalva and Ivane Akhaltsikheli to face the enemy alone. Ivane was killed while retreating into the mountains, and Shalva, severely wounded, was captured. He was initially treated with a degree of honor by Jalal ad-Din, but after refusing to renounce Christianity, he was executed. Once again, internal rivalries and the fragmentation of authority among Georgia’s feudal elite proved disastrous. The failure to unite at a critical moment not only led to a military defeat but also symbolized the deeper political divisions that continued to undermine the kingdom’s stability.

== Aftermath ==
Jalal al-Din Mangburni captured Dvin and started towards Tbilisi. At that time, by his order, the captured Shalva Akhaltsikheli, who was sending letters from the enemy's camp and informing the Georgians of the enemy's plans, was executed. Queen Rusudan left the capital and moved to Kutaisi. The protection of Tbilisi was entrusted to Botso and Memna Botsodze. In 1226, as a result of the surrender, Jalal al-Din also captured Tbilisi, the city was sacked and a hundred thousand citizens were put to death for not renouncing Christianity.

A quarter of the Georgian army was annihilated, leaving the country poorly steeled against an upcoming Mongol invasion. The capture of Dvin brought about the end of Georgia's medieval heyday.

== Bibliography ==
- Alâeddin Atâ Melik Cüveynî (1999). Tarih-i Cihan Güşa. Translated by Mürsel Öztürk. Ankara: Ministry of Culture and Tourism.
- Margarian, Hayrapet, "On the History of the Battle of Garni," Armenian Review 37/4 (Winter 1984): pp. 63–71.
- Mikaberidze, Alexander (2015). Historical Dictionary of Georgia. Rowman & Littlefield Publishers. ISBN 9781442241466.
- Taneri, Aydın (1993). Harezmşahlar (in Turkish). Türkiye Diyanet Vakfı. ISBN 9786057931399.
- Lortkipanidze, Mariam; Japaridze, Otar; Muskhelishvili, David; Metreveli, Roin (2022). History of Georgia in four volumes, vol. III - History of Georgia from the 4th century to the 13th century (in Georgian). Tbilisi: Palitra L Publishing. ISBN 978-9941-35-128-0.
