= Georgian Rebellion of 1256 =

1256 uprising

- Part of Mongol rule in Georgia
Date	1256–1261
Location	Caucasus
Result	IIkhanid victory: Partition of Georgia; Independence of Western Georgia in 1259; Eastern Georgia remained under Mongol control

Belligerents
Ilkhanate	Kingdom of Georgia

Commanders and leaders
Arghun Aqa	David Narin; David Ulu; Sargis I Jaqeli

Strength
20,000 Horsemen, including Mongol-aligned Georgian forces	8,000 troops

Casualties and losses
Unknown	Heavy

The Georgian Rebellion of 1256 was an uprising against Mongol rule in the Kingdom of Georgia, sparked by excessive taxation and heavy military levies imposed by the Ilkhanate. The rebellion was led by David Narin of Imereti and later David Ulu of Kartli, but it was ultimately suppressed by the Mongol governor Arghun Aqa.

== Background ==
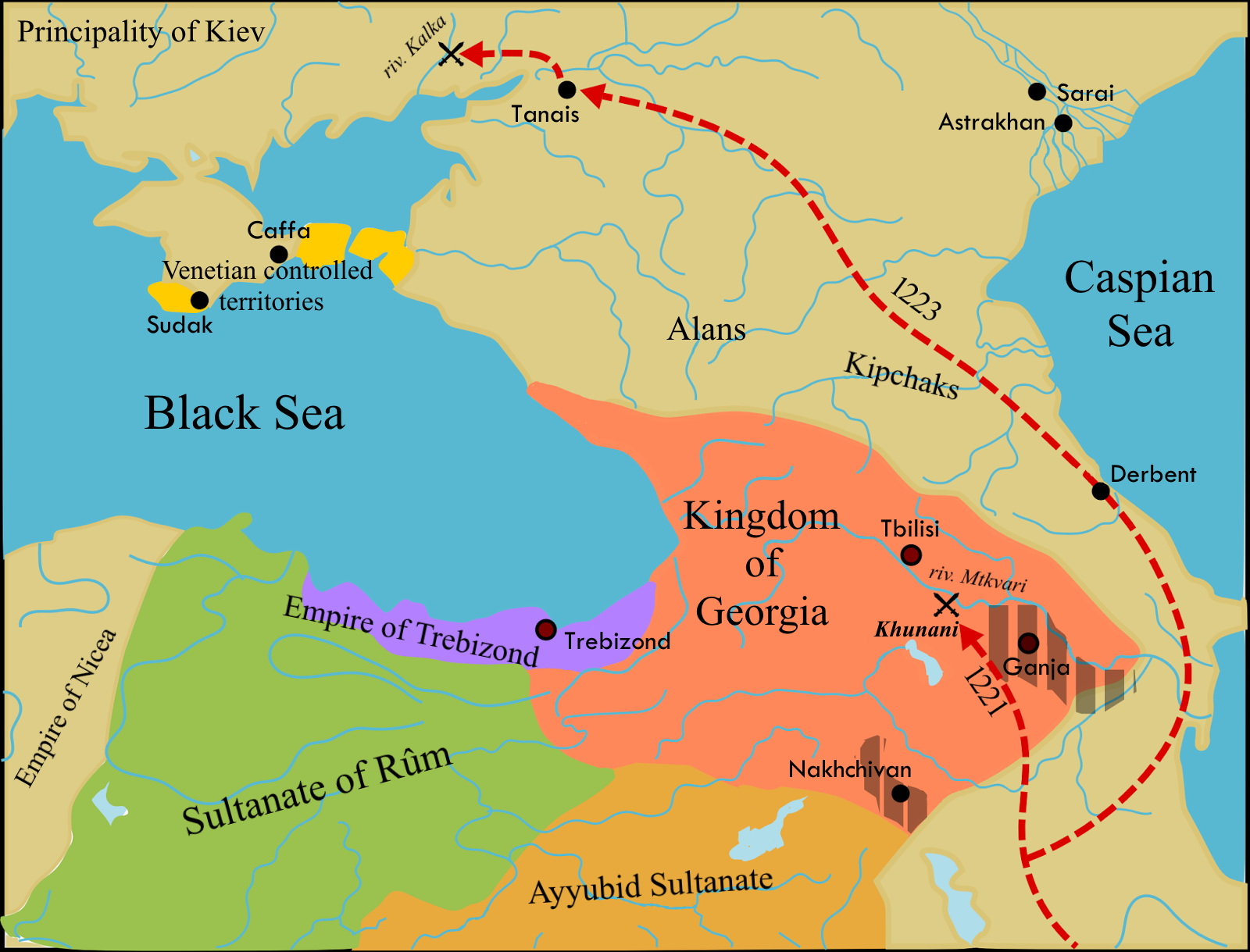
Mongol invasion of Georgia

After the Mongol invasions of Georgia, Georgia was split into five administrative vilayats, one of which was the vilayat of Gurjistan (Georgia). It was, in turn, subdivided into eight tumans (divisions), each of which had to supply 10,000 men for Mongol armies. The Georgian nobles enjoyed direct access to the Great Khan in Karakorum, but after the creation of the Ilkhanate, they became subordinated to Hülegü Khan through his governor, Arghun Aqa. The Mongols frequently levied Georgian troops for their wars, particularly against the Isma'ilis (Assassins). This caused great discontent among the Georgian nobility, as their army was usually positioned in the forefront of the battlefield and suffered the greatest losses.

== Rebellion of David Narin ==
The initial phase of the rebellion started in western Georgia, in the Imereti province, where David Narin, the younger of the two royal cousins who ruled Georgia, rebelled against his suzerain, although he did not drag his royal colleague into the rebellion. The Ilkhanate soon put an end to this revolt after a few short, bloody battles, while David Narin managed to take refuge in western Georgia. Arriving in Kutaisi, one of the largest towns in western Georgia, he declared the secession of the domains west of the Likhi mountains, and was proclaimed King of western Georgia by the local nobility in 1259.

== Rebellion of David Ulu ==
David Ulu, the senior Georgian ruler, initially maintained his alliance with the Mongols but grew increasingly discontented due to escalating military demands. By 1260, he rebelled after being forced to contribute troops to the Mongol invasions of the Levant, culminating in the disastrous Battle of Ain Jalut. The rebellion was further provoked by the actions of a Persian tax official, Hajji Aziz, whose harsh tax collection methods angered the population. The rebellion was met with a strong Mongol response under the command of Arghun Aqa, who led a force of 20,000 cavalry to suppress the uprising.

David Ulu's rebellion did not attract broad support among the Georgian nobility. Only Sargis I Jaqeli of Samtskhe supported him with 8,000 men. Though the rebels achieved an initial success over a Mongol advance guard, they were subsequently defeated by a Mongol-aligned Georgian force.

== Suppression and aftermath ==
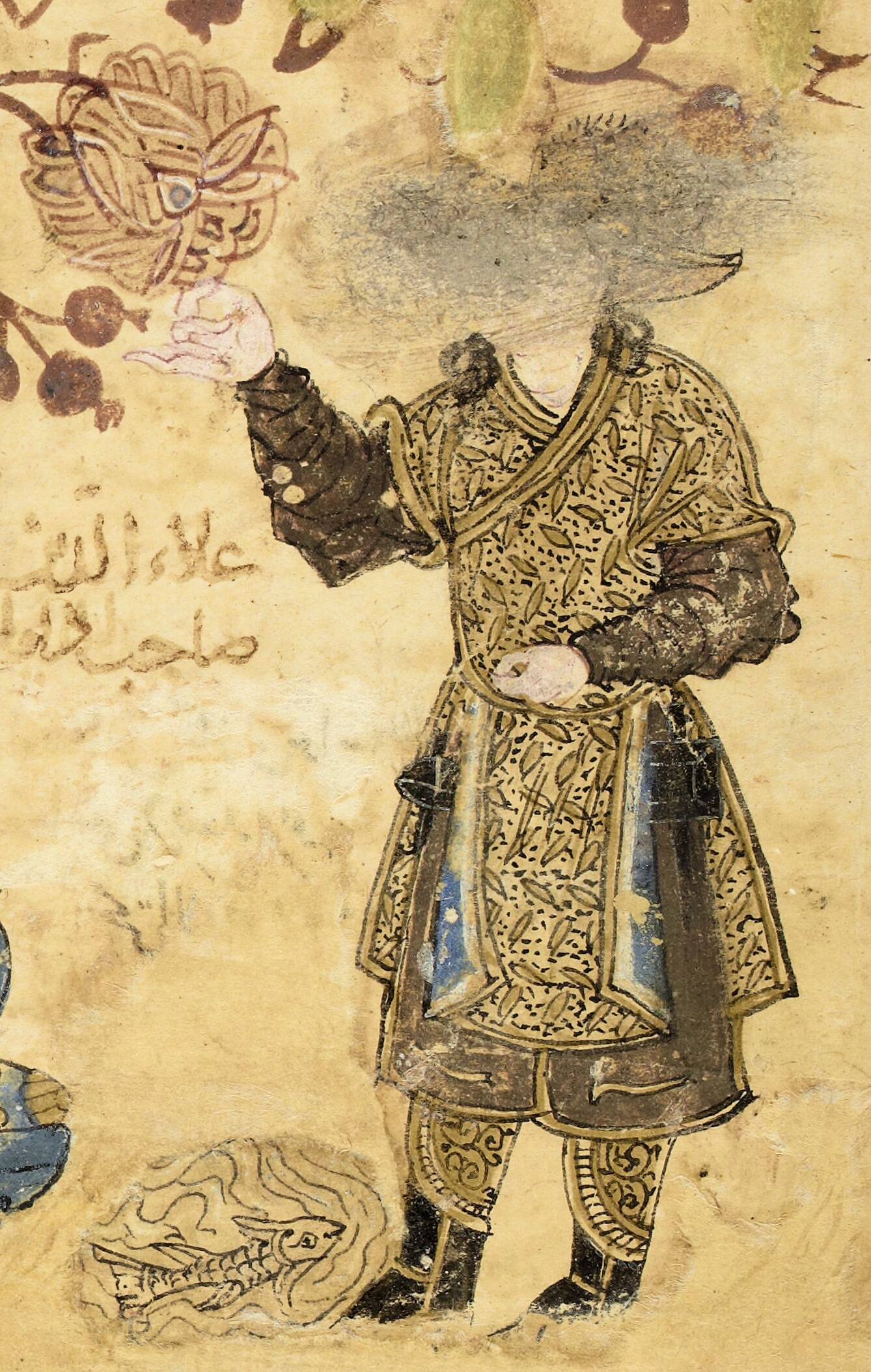
Arghun Khan in Tārīkh-i Jahān-Gushā

Arghun Aqa reacted with fierce retaliations. As Armenian historian Kirakos Gandzaketsi records, Arghun ravaged whole districts, took civilians into captivity, and profaned religious establishments. He took Queen Gvantsa Kakhaberidze and her daughter Khoshak Zakarian, along with other Georgian nobles, hostage and demanded hefty ransoms for their release.

Zakaria III Mkhargrdzeli was put to death at the Ilkhanid court at Qazvin on tax evasion charges, and Hasan Jalal, the lord of Khachen, was tortured before his execution, according to reports. In spite of the oppression, hostilities between the Ilkhanate and Georgia continued to break out. David Narin was ultimately acknowledged as the ruler of Imereti, and David Ulu was reinstated as the king of Kartli under Mongol suzerainty. In an attempt to alleviate enmities, the Ilkhanate had Hajji Aziz executed.
