= House of Toreli =

The House of Toreli (Georgian: თორელი), earlier known as the Gamrekeli (გამრეკელი), was a noble family in medieval Georgia, known from the 10th century and prominent into the 14th. The dynastic name "Toreli" is derived from the territorial epithet, literally meaning "of Tori", a historic district and the family's original fiefdom in south-central Georgia.

== History ==
The Toreli rose to particular prominence during the Georgian Golden Age under Queen Tamar (r. 1178/1184–1213) and her immediate successors, George IV (r. 1213–1223) and Rusudan (r. 1223–1246). They held fiefs in south and central Georgia and, at times, governed the newly conquered north Armenian districts on behalf of the crown. Several members of the family – one of the most important princely houses at that time – occupied important posts in the administration and army, including the dignity of amirspasalar. A senior branch held the hereditary office of eristavi ("duke") of Akhalkalaki, and a junior branch – Akhaltsikheli – that of Akhaltsikhe. At one point in the 12th century, the former was briefly surpassed by the latter, whose influence quickly waned after the death of Shalva and Ivane Akhaltsikheli during the Khwarezmian invasion in 1225.

The Toreli went in gradual decline during the Mongol hegemony over Georgia in the course of the 13th century. Of the Toreli branches, the longest surviving were the Javakhishvili, in Shida Kartli, eventually confirmed as princes (knyaz) of the Russian Empire in 1850.

Some Georgian historians (such as S. Kakabadze, N. Shoshiashvili, S. Tsaishvili) have put forward a tentative hypothesis identifying the medieval Georgian epic poet Shota Rustaveli with a member of the Toreli family.
