= Battle of Basiani =

1202 battle of the Georgian-Seljuk Wars

- Part of the Georgian–Seljuk wars
Date	c. 1203/1204
Location	Near Basiani (present-day Pasinler, Turkey) 39°58′47″N 41°40′32″E
Result	Georgian victory

Belligerents
Kingdom of Georgia	Sultanate of Rum; Mengujekids

Commanders and leaders
David Soslan; Zakaria II Mkhargrdzeli; Shalva Akhaltsikheli; Ivane Akhaltsikheli; Ivane Mkhargrdzeli	Suleiman II; Tughril Shah (POW); Fahrettin Behramşah (POW)

Strength
65,000–90,000	150,000–400,000

The Battle of Basiani (Georgian: ბასიანის ბრძოლა) was fought between the armies of the Kingdom of Georgia and the Seljukid Sultanate of Rum in the Basiani Valley, 60 km north-east of the city of Erzurum in what is now northeast Turkey. The date of the battle has been debated, but recent scholarship tends to favor the years 1203 or 1204. According to modern Turkish historians, the site of the battle is usually identified as the castle of Micingerd (Mazankert).

== Date ==
According to the contemporary Muslim chronicler Ibn Bibi, the battle took place in 598 AH (October 1, 1201 – September 19, 1202). Modern scholars date the battle variously between 1202 and 1206: 1202, 1203, 1203/1204, 1204, 1204/1205, 1205, 1206 but in recent times preference has been given to around 1203, or between 1202 and 1204.

== Background ==
At the end of the 12th century, the Sultanate of Rum fell into turmoil due to Turkmen raids, the Crusades, and an intense struggle for power among the sons of Kilij Arslan II (1156–1192). In 1197, Kilij Arslan’s fifth son, Suleiman II of Rum, seized Konya and forced his brother, Kaykhusraw I, into exile in Constantinople. Suleiman II pursued an expansionist policy, challenging Byzantium, the Armenian Kingdom of Cilicia, and Georgia, thereby consolidating most of Anatolia under his rule.

The rise of the Georgian Kingdom, initiated under King David IV the Builder, continued during the reign of Queen Tamar. Under her leadership, Georgia defeated a major Muslim coalition at the Battle of Shamkor in 1195.

== Battle ==
=== Prelude ===
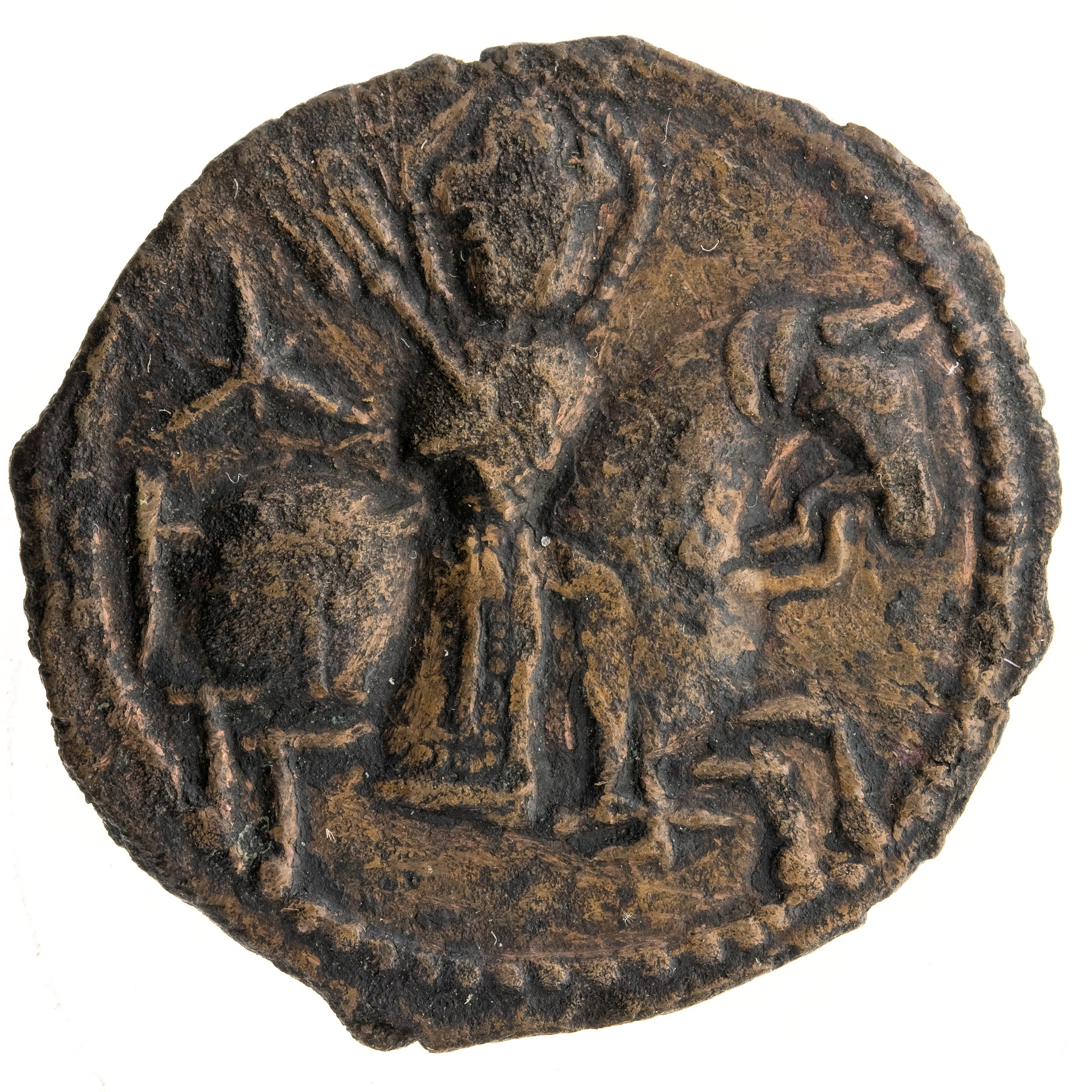
Suleyman II of Rum (1198-1199 CE)

Alarmed by Georgia’s growing power, Sultan Suleiman II of Rum gathered the Muslim principalities of Anatolia into an alliance against Georgia. The interests of Georgia and the Sultanate of Rum clashed along the southern coast of the Black Sea, where both sought to exploit Byzantium’s weakness and establish their own spheres of influence.

Suleiman II prepared for war with the dual aim of weakening Christian Georgia and ultimately conquering it. Between 1201 and 1203, the sultan—supported by troops commanded by his brother, Tughril ibn Kılıç Arslan II Shah of Elbistan, the Mengujekid ruler Bahram Shah of Erzincan, possibly the Artuqids of Harput, and local Turkmen warriors—captured Erzurum. There he deposed Georgia’s vassal, Saltuk, and replaced him with his brother, Tughril Shah.

Suleiman II's envoys delivered letters to Queen Tamar demanding her capitulation and threatening the annihilation of disobedient Christians. In these letters, the sultan mocked the queen, declaring: “Every woman is simple-minded… you are a simple-minded queen… a murderer and collector of tribute from Muslims.” Tamar’s initial response was dignified yet firm: “You rely on gold and the multitude of your warriors; I rely on the power of God.”

The envoy also conveyed an oral message from the sultan: that Suleiman II would make Tamar his wife if she accepted Islam, or his concubine if she refused. Zakaria II Mkhargrdzeli struck the messenger and told him, “Were you not an envoy, your tongue would be cut out first and your head next.” He then foretold that divine judgment would soon befall Suleiman II at the hands of the Georgians.

=== Preparations for Battle ===
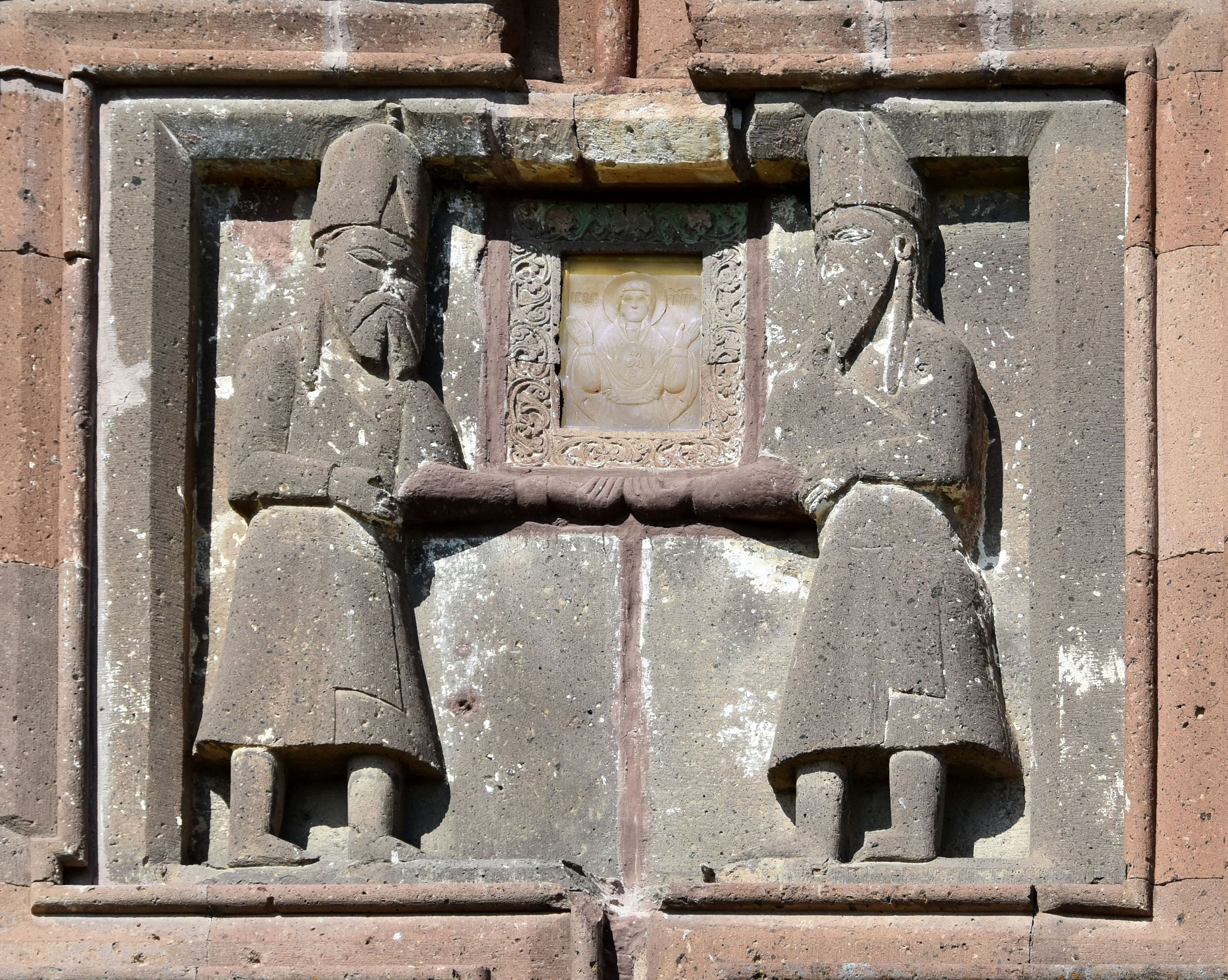
Zakaria II and Ivane I Mkhargrdzeli on the east facade at Harichavank, Armenia.

The Georgian army, numbering approximately 65,000–90,000 troops, was made ready for combat within ten days. As soon as Suleiman II's envoy departed, the army advanced to the battlefield under the command of David Soslan. Among his leading officers were Zakaria and Ivane Mkhargrdzeli, Shalva Akhaltsikheli, and Ivane Akhaltsikheli, along with other distinguished commanders.

According to The Life of Queen Tamar, the Georgian forces assembled in Vardzia before the march, where Queen Tamar addressed her troops from the balcony of a church. The chronicle records: “Queen Tamar herself led her army, barefoot, with her face washed by tears.”

Suleiman II, meanwhile, gathered his own forces. He was supported by his brother-in-law, the Emir of Erzincan, though he was betrayed by Erzurum, whose leaders remembered their former vassalage to Georgia. Muslim sources—both Arab and Turkish—claim that his army numbered around 400,000 men, though estimates vary widely, from 150,000 to 400,000.

=== The Battle ===
Approximate dates of Georgian control. Mouseover for name.
Blue circle=Capital
Black dot=Georgian held cities and fortresses
Red dot=Sultanate of Rum
X=Major battle

After assembling his allied contingents, Suleiman II's massive army advanced toward the Georgian frontier and encamped near Basiani. The Georgian forces were deployed in a well-coordinated formation: the western (Abkhaz-Imeretian) and eastern (Kartlian and Hereti-Kakhetian) divisions held the flanks, while a powerful central corps of 40,000 warriors stood under the command of Shalva and Ivane Akhaltsikheli. The vanguard was led by Zakaria II Mkhargrdzeli.

Under cover of night, the Georgians launched a surprise assault with their advance troops, sowing confusion and panic among the enemy ranks. Although the sultan managed to rally his forces and mount a counterattack, they were soon overwhelmed by a series of coordinated flanking maneuvers that shattered the Seljuk lines.

The troops of Suleiman II fought fiercely, forcing many Georgian cavalrymen to dismount and fight on foot. For a time, the Georgians appeared close to defeat, until the main Georgian divisions under David Soslan struck from the flanks, encircling the Turks and turning the tide of battle.

The historian Ibn Bibi attributed the collapse of Seljuk morale to an incident involving the sultan’s standard-bearer, whose horse slipped and fell. The accident reportedly sparked rumors of Suleiman II's death, causing widespread panic and disarray in his ranks.

According to the historian Aqsarayi, the Seljuks fell into a Georgian ambush, while the Georgian chronicle emphasizes the courage and steadfastness of the Georgian soldiers, as well as divine intervention, though it concedes that the Georgians nearly suffered defeat at one point in the engagement.

== Aftermath ==
Kingdom of Georgia under Queen Tamar's reign.

The Battle of Basiani resulted in heavy casualties on both sides. Suleiman II was forced to retreat to Erzurum, while the Georgians captured numerous war banners as trophies. Many of the sultan’s allies were taken prisoner, including the Emir of Erzincan, one of his closest supporters.

In his Historical Compilation, the Armenian chronicler Vardan Areveltsi wrote that David Soslan “filled Georgia with Turkish captives and spoils.” Enraged by the betrayal of her former vassal, Queen Tamar ordered the Emir of Erzincan, Fahrettin Behramşah, to be sold into slavery for the price of a single iron horseshoe. According to the Georgian chronicle, following the victory, “after the banner of Nukarden came the commander of Erzincan, followed by other prominent figures. They were presented before Queen Tamar, who received them graciously, offering words of comfort and honoring each according to his rank. Later, they were distributed among various fortresses, except for the lord of Erzincan, who was kept in Tbilisi out of respect for their previous friendship. In time, however, this noble and illustrious man was sold for a horseshoe.” Despite his captivity, Queen Tamar treated Behramşah as a guest rather than as a prisoner.

The victory at Basiani secured Georgian supremacy in the region. Building upon this success, Queen Tamar annexed Arran and Dvin, and extended her authority over the emirates of Kars, the Shah-Armens, Erzurum, and Erzincan.

Although defeated, Tughril ibn Kılıç Arslan II, the brother of Sultan Suleiman II, retained control over Erzurum. However, in 1206, the Georgians captured and occupied the rebellious cities of Erzurum and Kars.

Following the victory, Archbishop Anton Gnolistavisdze acquired an Arabic medical manuscript, which he translated into Georgian as the Book for Physicians (Tsigni Saakimoy), one of the earliest Galenic medical works produced in Georgia.

== Sources ==
- Asatiani, Nodar; Janelidze, Otar (2009). History of Georgia. Tbilisi: Publishing House Petite. ISBN 978-9941-9063-6-7.
- Baumer, Christoph (2023). History of the Caucasus. Bloomsbury Publishing. ISBN 9780755636303.
- Brosset, Marie-Félicité (1849). Histoire de la Géorgie depuis l'Antiquité jusqu'au XIXe siècle. Volume I [History of Georgia from Ancient Times to the 19th Century, Volume 1] (in French). Saint-Petersburg: Imperial Academy of Sciences.
- Cahen, Claude (2001) [1988]. The Formation of Turkey: The Seljukid Sultanate of Rūm: Eleventh to Fourteenth Century. Translated by Peter Malcolm Holt. Longman.
- (in Russian) V. Dondua et al. (transl., 1985), Жизнь царицы цариц Тамар (The Life of the Queen of Queens Tamar), Commentaries by N. Berdzenishvili. Tbilisi: Metsniereba
- Eastmond, Antony (1998). Royal imagery in medieval Georgia. University Park: Pennsylvania State University Press. ISBN 978-0-271-01628-3.
- Eastmond, Antony (2017). Tamta's world: the life and encounters of a medieval noblewoman from the Middle East to Mongolia. Cambridge: Cambridge University Press. ISBN 978-1-107-16756-8.
- Javakhishvili, Ivane (1946). Внутреннее положение страны в начале царствования Тамары [The internal situation of the country at the beginning of Tamara's reign]. История Грузии. С древнейших времен до начала XIX века : Часть I.
- Javakhishvili, Ivane (1983). ქართველი ერის ისტორია [History of the Georgian Nation] (in Georgian). Tbilisi: Georgia, USSR. Archived 2019-09-27 at the Wayback Machine
- Lordkipanidze, Mariam (1994). "Georgia in the 11th–12th centuries". Essays on Georgian history. Tbilisi: Metsniereba. ISBN 978-5-520-01547-5.
- (in Georgian) Melikishvili, Giorgi et al. (1970), საქართველოს ისტორიის ნარკვევები (Studies in the History of Georgia), Vol. 2. Tbilisi: Sabch’ota Sakartvelo.
- Mikaberidze, Alexander (2007). Historical dictionary of Georgia. Historical dictionaries of Europe. Vol. 50. Lanham, Maryland: Scarecrow press. ISBN 978-0-8108-5580-9.
- Mikaberidze, Alexander (2011). "Basian, Battle of (1203)". Conflict and conquest in the Islamic world: a historical encyclopedia. Santa Barbara, California: ABC-CLIO. ISBN 978-1-59884-336-1.
- Peacock, Andrew (2006). "Georgia and the Anatolian Turks in the 12th and 13th centuries". Anatolian Studies. 56: 127–146. doi:10.1017/S0066154600000806. ISSN 0066-1546. JSTOR 20065551. S2CID 155798755.
- Peacock, A.C.S.; Yildiz, Sara Nur, eds. (2015). The Seljuks of Anatolia: Court and Society in the Medieval Middle East. I.B. Tauris.
- Rayfield, Donald (2012). Edge of Empires, a History of Georgia. London: Reaktion Books. ISBN 978-1-78023-070-2.
- Shengelia, Nodar (1979). Очерки истории Грузии: в восьми томах: Том III. [Essays on the history of Georgia: in eight volumes: Volume III.] (in Georgian). «Сабчота Сакартвело» [Советская Грузия].
- Salia, Kalistrat (1983). "Battle of Basiani (1205)". History of the Georgian nation. Paris: N. Salia. pp. 180–181.
- (in Turkish) Osman Turan, Selçuklular Zamaninda Türkiye, Istanbul, 1971
