= Shalva Akhaltsikheli =

Georgian military commander

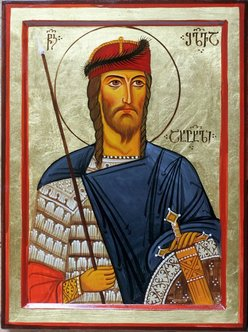

Duke (Eristavi) of Akhalkalaki
- In office ?–1226
- Preceded by: Kakha II Toreli
- Succeeded by: Gamrekeli III Toreli

Mechurchletukhutsesi
- In office 1212–1222
- Preceded by: Abulasan
- Succeeded by: Ivane I Jaqeli

Mandaturtukhutsesi
- In office 1202–1215
- Preceded by: Zakare II Zakarian
- Succeeded by: Shahnshah Zakarian

Personal details
- Born: Unknown
- Died: 1226
- Children: Pharadavla Akhaltsikheli

Military service
- Battles/wars: Battle of Shamkor; Battle of Basiani; Siege of Kars; Battle of Garni (executed)

Saint Shalva Akhaltsikheli
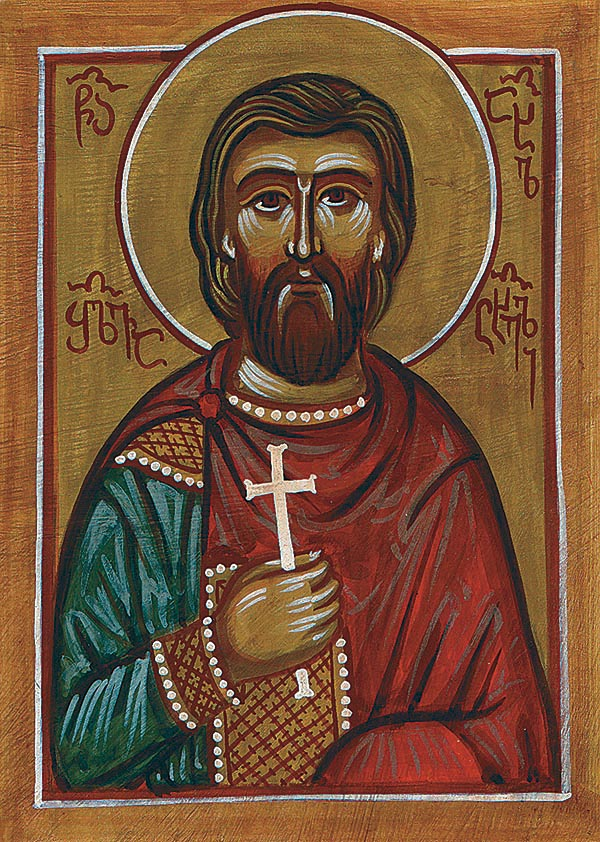
- Born: Unknown
- Died: 1226
- Venerated in: Georgian Orthodox Church
- Feast: June 17

Shalva Akhaltsikheli (Georgian: შალვა ახალციხელი; died 1226) was a Georgian military commander and court official. He was a member of the Akhaltsikheli family and held the title of Duke of Akhalkalaki. Shalva served as Mechurchletukhutsesi (Lord High Treasurer) and Mandaturtukhutsesi (Lord High Mandator), under Queen Tamar and her successor, King George IV. He was canonized by the Georgian Orthodox Church which commemorates him on June 17/June 30 (O.S.).

== Biography ==
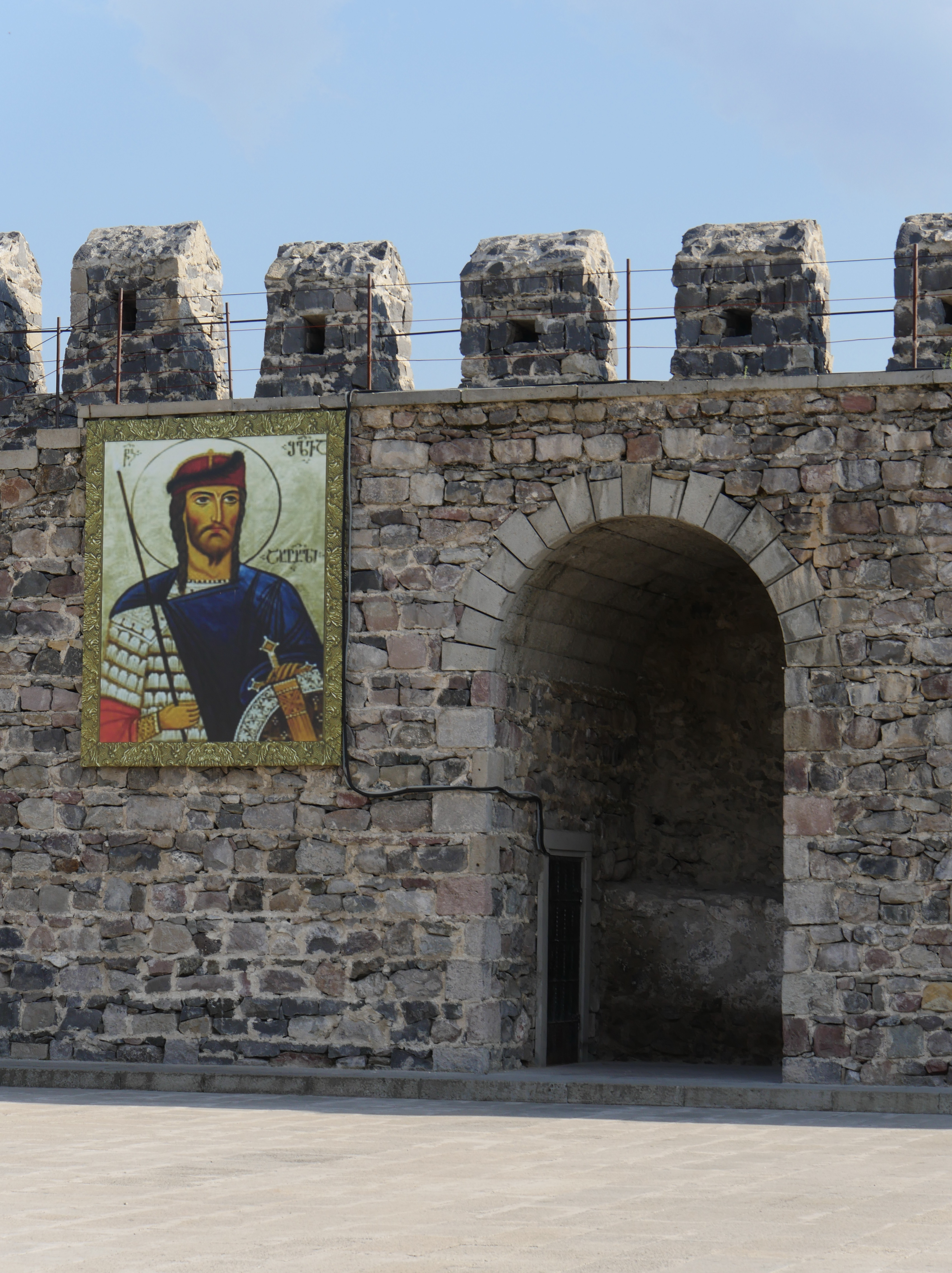
Icon of Shalva Akhaltsikheli in Akhaltsikhe, Georgia.

Shalva was a member of the Akhaltsikheli family, a branch of the House of Toreli in southwest Georgia. Their original fief was Akhaltsikhe. After the death of Gamrekeli Toreli, the Akhaltsikheli family was granted the Duchy of Akhalkalaki, and Shalva became its duke. Together with his brother, Ivane Akhaltsikheli, he commanded the vanguard, which was traditionally composed of Meskhetian troops from southern Georgia.

At the Battle of Shamkor in 1195, Shalva distinguished himself by capturing a war banner that had been sent by the Caliph to the Eldiguzid army. The banner was subsequently dedicated to the revered icon of Our Lady of Khakhuli. At the Battle of Basiani in 1202, Shalva, together with his brother Ivane, commanded the central division of the Georgian army, leading approximately 40,000 troops.

Local Meskhetian forces under Shalva and Ivane Akhaltsikheli, together with Sargis Tmogveli, had intermittently blockaded Kars. In 1206–1207, with the support of Queen Tamar’s army under David Soslan and the Zakarian brothers, the Georgians laid siege to the city. After the long siege, the Georgians compelled the emir of Kars to surrender. Tamar appointed Ivane Akhaltsikheli as ruler of the city.

During the Khwarazmian invasion of Georgia, Shalva and his brother Ivane were again placed in charge of the vanguard of the Georgian army commanded by Atabeg Ivane Mkhargrdzeli. In 1225, during the Battle of Garni, Shalva Akhaltsikheli commanded the Georgian vanguard alongside his brother Ivane. Their contingent, composed mainly of Meskhetian troops, faced the initial assault of Jalal al-Din Mangburni’s Khwarazmian forces. Despite stabilizing the front lines, Shalva repeatedly appealed to the Georgian commander, Ivane Mkhargrdzeli, to strike the enemy rear. Mkhargrdzeli, however, withheld his forces—possibly due to personal enmity with the Akhaltsikheli brothers.

Left without reinforcement, the Georgian vanguard was overwhelmed. Ivane Akhaltsikheli was killed, and Shalva, severely wounded, was taken prisoner. Initially treated with honor by Jalal al-Din, he refused to renounce Christianity and convert to Islam, for which he was executed. The Georgian Orthodox Church later canonized him as a martyr, commemorating his feast day on June 17 (O.S. June 30).

Shalva is traditionally believed to be praised in a patriotic Georgian folk ballad Shavlego, which was particularly popular during the national mobilization against the Soviet Union in the late 1980s.

== Bibliography ==
- Ibn al-Athīr, Izz ad-Dīn (2010). Donald S. Richards (ed.). The Chronicle of Ibn al-Athīr for the Crusading Period from al-Kāmil fī'l-ta'rīkh. Part 3 - The Years 589-629/1193-1231: The Ayyubids after Saladin and the Mongol Menace. Ashgate. ISBN 9780754669524.
- Asatiani, Nodar; Janelidze, Otar (2009). History of Georgia: From Ancient Times to the Present Day. Publishing House Petite. ISBN 9789941906367.
- Allen, William (2023). A History of the Georgian People: From the Beginning Down to the Russian Conquest in the Nineteenth Century. Taylor & Francis. ISBN 9781000855302.
- Mikaberidze, Alexander (2015). Historical Dictionary of Georgia. Rowman & Littlefield Publishers. ISBN 9781442241466.
- Lortkipanidze, Mariam; Japaridze, Otar; Muskhelishvili, David; Metreveli, Roin (2022). History of Georgia in four volumes, vol. III - History of Georgia from the 4th century to the 13th century (in Georgian). Tbilisi: Palitra L Publishing. ISBN 978-9941-35-128-0.
