= June 17 (Eastern Orthodox liturgics) =

Day in the Eastern Orthodox liturgical calendar

Eastern Orthodox liturgical calendar
June 16	June 17	June 18
June 17 O.S. ≍ June 30 N.S. June 17 N.S ≍ June 4 O.S.

An Eastern Orthodox cross

June 17 in Eastern Orthodox liturgical calendars is a feast day and a day of commemoration of saints and martyrs. Although some Orthodox churches use the Revised Julian Calendar and others use the traditional Julian calendar, the fixed commemorations for their respective June 17 are broadly the same, no matter which calendar is used. (Note: Despite the dates being the same, the days to which they refer typically differ by 13 days. The notation Old Style or O.S. is sometimes used to indicate a date in the traditional Julian Calendar (the "Old Calendar"). The notation New Style or N.S. indicates a date in the Revised Julian calendar (the "New Calendar").)

== Saints ==
- Martyr Djan Darada (Aetius the Eunuch), the Ethiopian eunuch of Queen Candace, baptized by the Apostle Philip (1st century) (see also: January 4, August 27)
- Hieromartyr Isaurus, deacon, and with him Martyrs Basil, Innocent, Felix, Hermias and Peregrinus, of Athens and Appolonia in Macedonia (284) (Note: "At Apollonia, in Macedonia, the holy martyrs Isaurus, deacon, Innocent, Felix, Jeremias, and Peregrinus, natives of Athens, who were tortured in different manners by the tribune Tripontius, and finally decapitated.") (see also: July 6)
- Hieromartyr Philoneides, Bishop of Kourion in Cyprus (c. 306) (see also: August 30)
- Martyrs Manuel, Sabel, and Ismael of Persia, at Constantinople (363) (Note: "At Chalcedon, the holy martyrs Manuel, Sabel, and Ismael, whom the king of Persia sent as ambassadors to Julian the Apostate to treat of peace. Having firmly refused to worship idols, as they had been commanded by the emperor, they were put to the sword.")
- Venerables Joseph and Pior (395), of Scetis, disciples of Saint Anthony the Great (4th century)
- Venerable Bessarion the Great, Wonderworker of Egypt (4th-5th century) (see also: February 20)
- Venerable Hypatius, Abbot, of the monastery of the Rufinianes, Confessor (446) (Note: "In Phrygia, St. Hypatius, confessor.")

== Pre-Schism Western saints ==
- Saint Antidius (Antel, Antible, Tude), disciple and successor of St Froninus as Bishop of Besançon in France; put to death by the Vandals at the hamlet called Ruffey (c. 265)
- Saint Montanus, a soldier who was taken to the island of Ponza in Italy and martyred (c. 300) (Note: A soldier who was taken to the island of Ponza in Italy and martyred by being thrown into the sea with a heavy stone tied round his neck. Christians recovered his body and enshrined it in Gaeta.) (Note: "At Terracina, St. Montanus, a soldier, who received the crown of martyrdom after suffering many torments, in the time of the emperor Adrian and the ex-consul Leontius.")
- 262 Martyrs of Rome, under Diocletian, buried on the old Via Salaria in Rome. (Note: "AT Rome, during the persecution of Diocletian, the birthday of two hundred and sixty-two holy martyrs, who were put to death for the faith of Christ, and buried on the old Salarian road, at the foot of Cucumer hill.")
- Saint Avitus (Avy), Abbot of Micy near Orleans, Confessor (c. 530) (Note: First of all a monk at Menat in Auvergne in France, then Abbot of Micy near Orleans, and finally a hermit in the Perche, where he was forced by his numerous disciples to build and become abbot of a new monastery.)
- Saint Himerius of Cremona, Bishop of Ameila in Umbria (c. 560) (Note: Born in Calabria in Italy, he became a monk and then Bishop of Ameila in Umbria. He is described as a great ascetic. In 995 his relics were translated to Cremona where he is one of the main patron-saints.) (Note: "At Amelia, in Umbria, the bishop St. Himerius, whose body was translated to Cremona.")
- Venerable Herveus of Plouvien (Hervé), blind from childhood, he became Abbot of Plouvien, from where he moved with some of his monks to Lanhouarneau (c. 575)
- Saint Briavel, a hermit at St Briavels, now in Gloucestershire in England (6th century)
- Saint Gundulphus (Gondulph), a bishop in France who is said to have reposed in Bourges (6th century)
- Martyr Nectan of Hartland, in Devon, hermit (6th century) (Note: "NECTAN appears to have been one of the numerous children of Brechan, Prince of Brecknock. Like nearly all of his family he became a Saint, and is said to have suffered martyrdom, but on what occasion is not related. He was buried at Hartland, - the church of which place was served originally by secular canons; but in the reign of Henry II was converted into a Monastery of Augustinians.")
- Saint Agrippinus, Bishop of Como in the north of Italy (615)
- Saint Botolph, Abbot and Confessor, of Ikanhoe, England (680), and his brother, Saint Adolph the Confessor, Bishop of Maastricht (7th century) (Note: Brothers and monks in England. Though little is known of Adulf, Botulf founded a monastery at Iken in Suffolk and was famed for his piety. Over seventy churches were dedicated to St Botulf, including four at the gates of the City of London.)
- Saint Molling (Mo Ling, Myllin, Molignus, Dairchilla), a monk at Glendalough, later Abbot of Aghacainid (Teghmolin, St Mullins), then Bishop of Ferns (697)
- Saint Fulk the Venerable, archbishop of Reims (900)
- Saint Rambold (Ramwod, Ramnold), a monk at St Maximinus in Trier in Germany, then Abbot of St Emmeram in Regensburg, centenarian (1001)

== Post-Schism Orthodox saints ==
- Martyr Shalva of Akhaltsikhe, Georgia (1227)
- Saint Ananias the Iconographer, of Novgorod (1581)

=== New martyrs and confessors ===
- New Hieromartyr Averky Severovostokov, Priest (1918) (Note: See: (in Russian) Северовостоков, Аверкий Яковлевич. Википедии. (Russian Wikipedia).)
- New Hieromartyr Nicander (Prusak), Hieromonk, of Yaroslavl (1918)
- New Hiero-confessor Maximus (Popov), Hieromonk, of Ryabash (Bashkiria) (1934) (Note: See: (in Russian) Максим (Попов). Википедии. (Russian Wikipedia).)
- Virgin-Martyr Pelagia Balakireva (1943)

== Other commemorations ==
- Uncovering of the relics of the Alfanov Brothers of Novgorod (1562): (Note: Their feast day is on May 4.)

- Sts. Nicetas, Cyril, Nicephorus, Clement, and Isaac, founders of the Sokolnitzki Monastery in 1389.

- Repose of Elder Gervasius (Paraskevopoulos) of Patras (1964) (Note: See: (in Greek) Γερβάσιος Παρασκευόπουλος. Βικιπαίδεια. (Greek Wikipedia).)

== Icon gallery ==
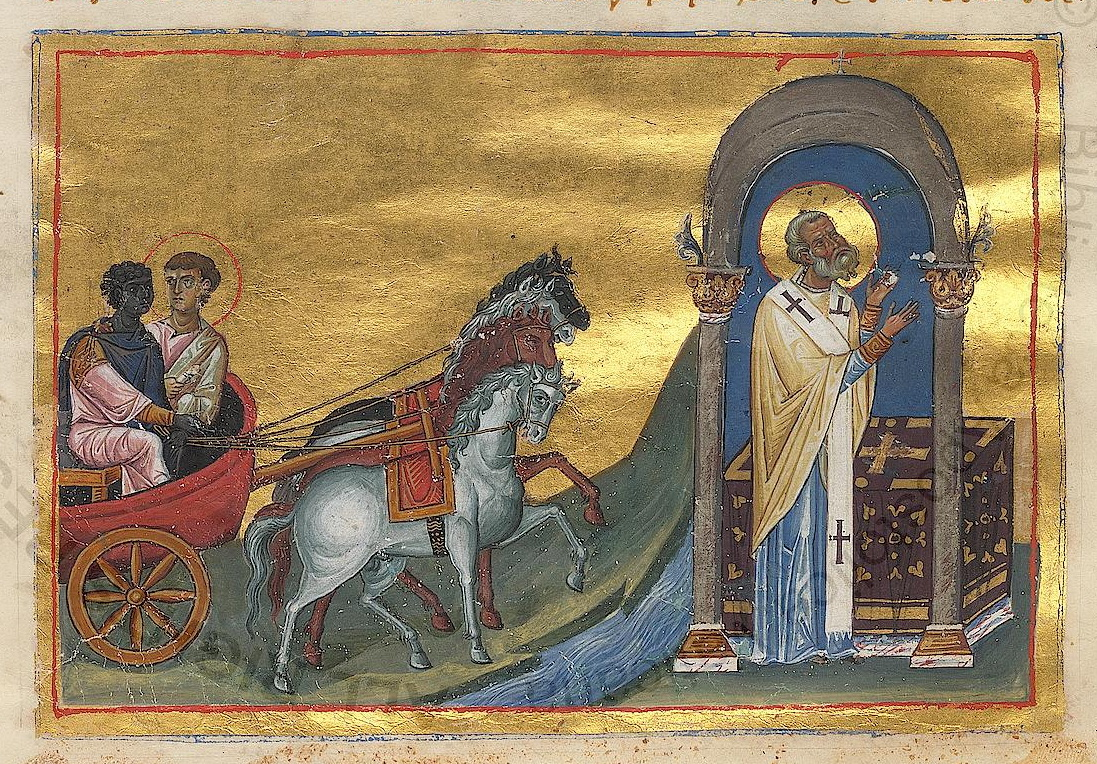
Philip and the Ethiopian eunuch (Menologion of Basil II).

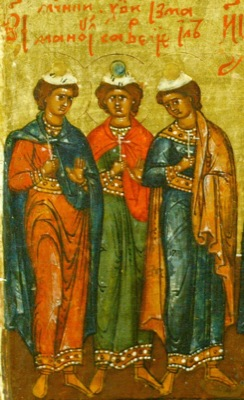
Martyrs Manuel, Sabel, and Ismael of Persia, at Constantinople.

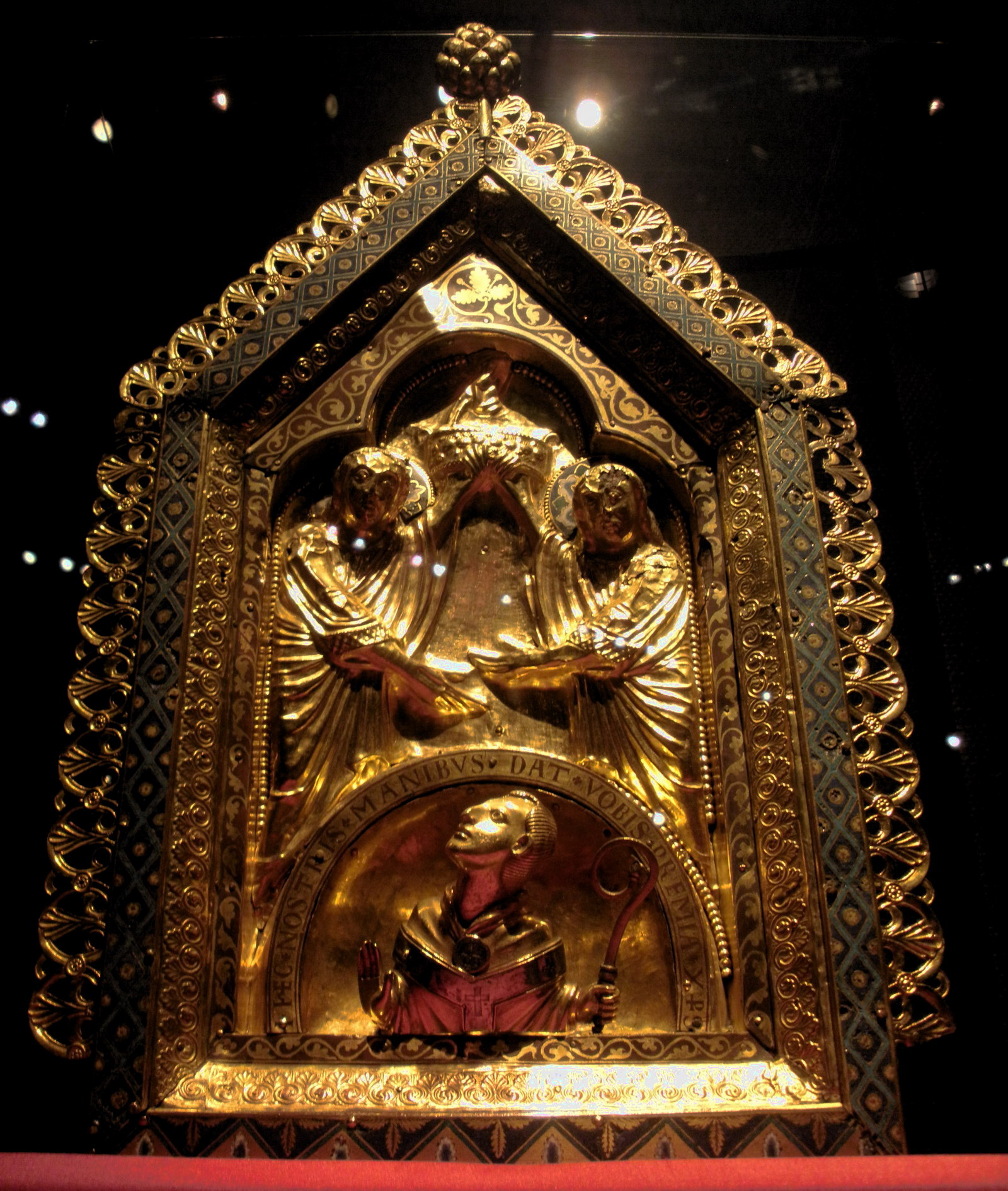
St. Gondulph of Maastricht, looking up from his grave.

Martyr Nectan of Hartland.

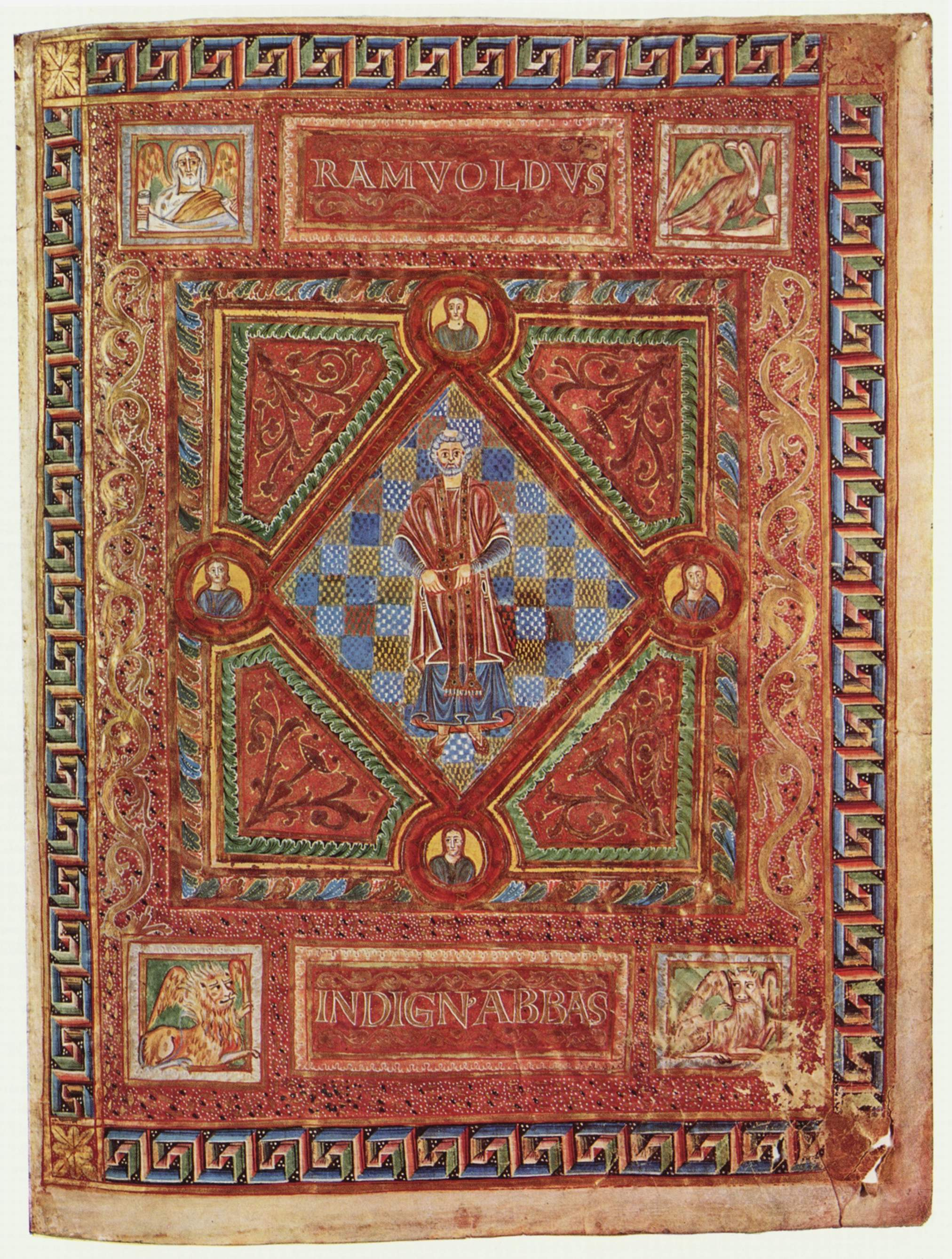
Portrait of St. Rambold on the Codex Aureus of St. Emmeram.

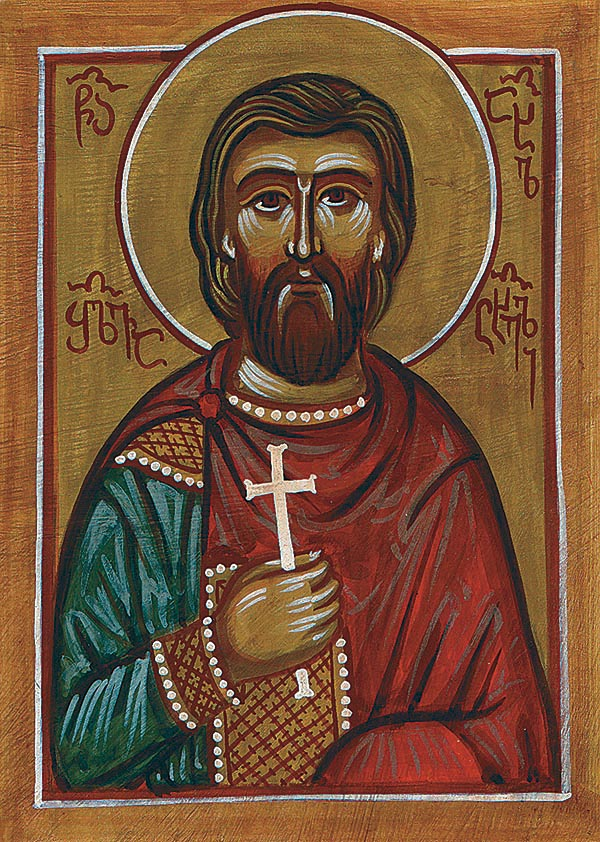
Martyr Shalva Akhaltsikheli.

== Sources ==
- June 17/30. Orthodox Calendar (PRAVOSLAVIE.RU).
- June 30 / June 17. HOLY TRINITY RUSSIAN ORTHODOX CHURCH (A parish of the Patriarchate of Moscow).
- June 17. OCA - The Lives of the Saints.
- The Autonomous Orthodox Metropolia of Western Europe and the Americas (ROCOR). St. Hilarion Calendar of Saints for the year of our Lord 2004. St. Hilarion Press (Austin, TX). pp. 44–45.
- The Seventeenth Day of the Month of June. Orthodoxy in China.
- June 17. Latin Saints of the Orthodox Patriarchate of Rome.
- The Roman Martyrology. Transl. by the Archbishop of Baltimore. Last Edition, According to the Copy Printed at Rome in 1914. Revised Edition, with the Imprimatur of His Eminence Cardinal Gibbons. Baltimore: John Murphy Company, 1916. pp. 176–177.
- Rev. Richard Stanton. A Menology of England and Wales, or, Brief Memorials of the Ancient British and English Saints Arranged According to the Calendar, Together with the Martyrs of the 16th and 17th Centuries. London: Burns & Oates, 1892. pp. 271–273.

Greek Sources

- Great Synaxaristes: (in Greek) 17 ΙΟΥΝΙΟΥ. ΜΕΓΑΣ ΣΥΝΑΞΑΡΙΣΤΗΣ.
- (in Greek) Συναξαριστής. 17 Ιουνίου. ECCLESIA.GR. (H ΕΚΚΛΗΣΙΑ ΤΗΣ ΕΛΛΑΔΟΣ).
- (in Greek) 17 Ιουνίου. Αποστολική Διακονία της Εκκλησίας της Ελλάδος (Apostoliki Diakonia of the Church of Greece).
- (in Greek) 17/06/2018. Ορθόδοξος Συναξαριστής.

Russian Sources

- (in Russian) 30 июня (17 июня). Православная Энциклопедия под редакцией Патриарха Московского и всея Руси Кирилла (электронная версия). (Orthodox Encyclopedia - Pravenc.ru).
- (in Russian) 17 июня по старому стилю / 30 июня по новому стилю. Русская Православная Церковь - Православный церковный календарь на 2017 год.
- (in Russian) 17 июня (ст.ст.) 30 июня 2014 (нов. ст.). Русская Православная Церковь Отдел внешних церковных связей. (DECR).
