= Siege of Kars (1206–1207) =

13th century siege

- Part of the Georgian–Seljuk wars
Date	1206–1207
Location	Kars, now Turkey
Result	Georgian victory: Emirate of Kars annexed to the Kingdom of Georgia

Belligerents
Emirate of Kars	Kingdom of Georgia

Commanders and leaders
Unknown	David Soslan; Zakare II Mkhargrdzeli; Ivane I Mkhargdzeli; Sargis Tmogveli; Shalva Akhaltsikheli; Ivane Akhaltsikheli

The siege of Kars was a siege laid by the Kingdom of Georgia against the Emirate of Kars. It ended with the Georgian victory and annexation of Kars to the Georgian Kingdom.

== Background ==
Sökmen II, the last ruler of the Sultanate of Khlat from the dynasty known after its title, Shah-Armens, died in 1185, which led to decades of struggle over Khlat between various actors. Both Eldiguzids and Saladin of Ayyubid dynasty intervened, although one of Sökmen's mamluks, Beytimur, managed to supersede them through cunning diplomacy. However, this was only beginning of the internal power struggles and external pressures, which ensued over the next years. During this period, a series of mamluks ruled over Khlat and its power rapidly declined. In 1206, the revolution in Khlat made the mamluk Balaban a new ruler, although the people of Khlat offered the town to Artuqid. Meanwhile, Najm al-Din, Ayyubid ruler of Mayyāfāriqīn, besieged Khlat, reviving the claims of his family over the town. However, this siege ended with no success for Ayyubid. At the same time, Georgians, which also contested control over Khlat, decided to take advantage of the turmoil there to annex Kars, which was a dependency of the Sultanate of Khlat. Local Meskhetian forces under Sargis Tmogveli and Shalva Akhaltsikheli had been blockading Kars intermittently for some years, and Queen Tamar of Georga decided to send a special army under David Soslan and brothers Zakaria and Ivane Mkhargrdzelis to assist their efforts.

== Siege ==
According to contemporary Muslim historian Ibn al-Athir, Georgians besieged the fortress of Kars and pressed hard on those within. They collected the revenue of the region for several years. The emir of Kars asked the rulers of Khlat for help, but its rulers did not provide any assistance. After the long siege, the emir of Kars, seeing that no assistance was coming, decided to hand over his domain to Georgians in exchange for a large amount of money and a fiefdom for him. Due to the significance of Kars, Tamar decided not to give it away as a favor as she had done in the case of Ani and Dvin, and she subjected Kars to the royal court, appointing Ivane Akhaltsikheli as it ruler.

== Bibliography ==
- Ibn al-Athīr, Izz ad-Dīn (2010). Donald S. Richards (ed.). The Chronicle of Ibn al-Athīr for the Crusading Period from al-Kāmil fī'l-ta'rīkh. Part 3 - The Years 589-629/1193-1231: The Ayyubids after Saladin and the Mongol Menace. Ashgate. ISBN 9780754669524.
- Peacock, Andrew (2006). "Georgia and the Anatolian Turks in the 12th and 13th centuries". Anatolian Studies. 56: 127–146. doi:10.1017/S0066154600000806. ISSN 0066-1546. JSTOR 20065551. S2CID 155798755.
- Asatiani, Nodar; Janelidze, Otar (2009). History of Georgia: From Ancient Times to the Present Day. Publishing House Petite. ISBN 9789941906367.
- Allen, William (2023). A History of the Georgian People: From the Beginning Down to the Russian Conquest in the Nineteenth Century. Taylor & Francis. ISBN 9781000855302.
