= Akhaltsikheli =

Georgian noble family

Akhaltsikheli ახალციხელები
- Nobility
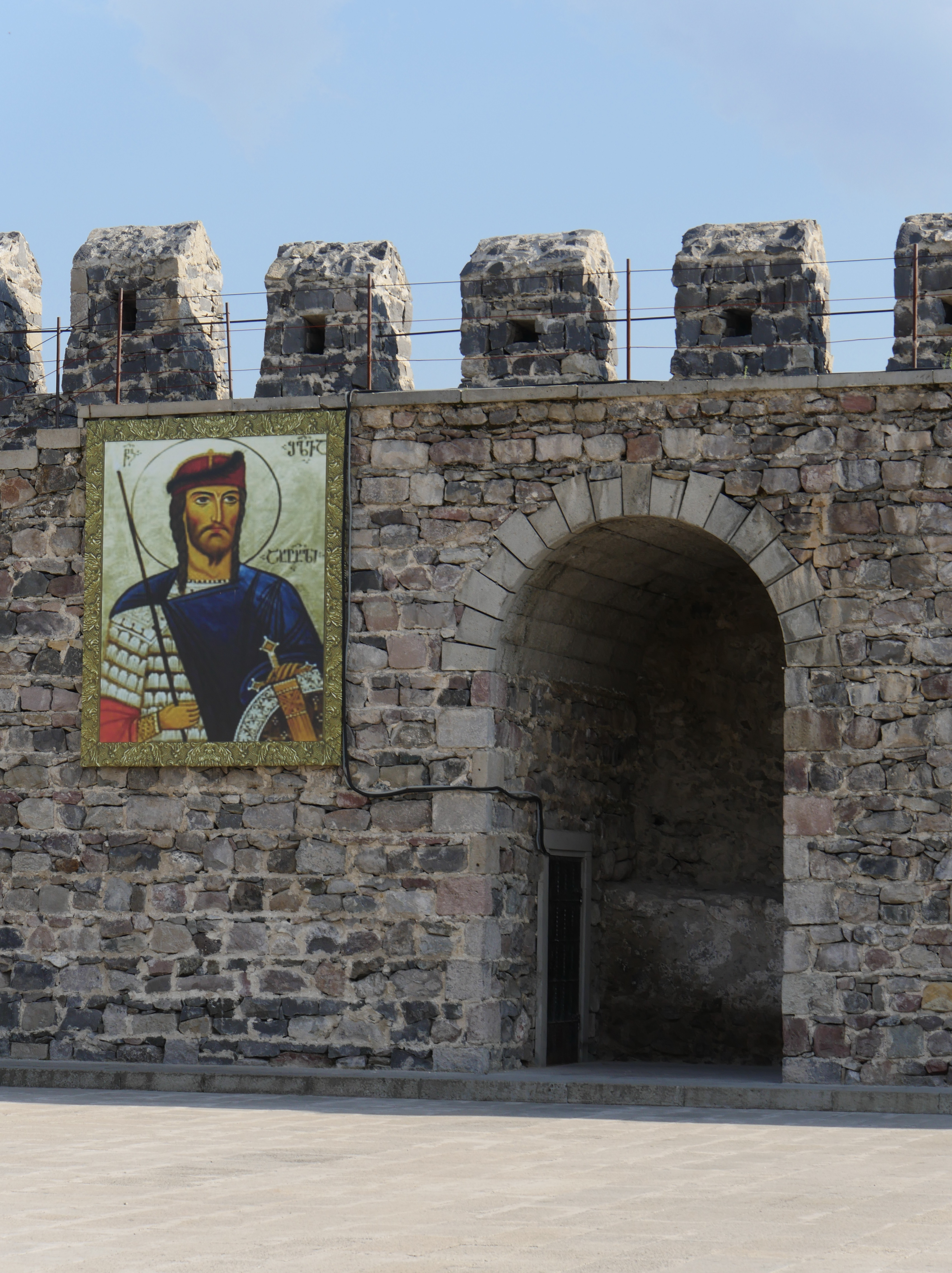
- Icon of Shalva Akhaltsikheli in Akhaltsikhe, the fiefdom of the Akhaltsikheli family
- Parent house: House of Toreli
- Country: Kingdom of Georgia

Akhaltsikheli (Georgian: ახალციხელი; pl. Akhaltsikhelebi, ახალციხელები) were a Georgian noble family prominent in the end of the 12th to the mid-13th centuries. Their name came from the city of Akhaltsikhe, their original fiefdom.

== History ==
They branched out from the Toreli ducal family towards the end of the 12th century and through loyal service to the Georgian crown acquired more lands including those ruled by their kinsmen from the Toreli house. As a result of the Khwarezmian and Mongol invasions, the family declined, lost their possessions to other noble families, and virtually became extinct by the end of the 13th century.

The most prominent of them were:

- Shalva Akhaltsikheli
- Ivane Akhaltsikheli (died 1225), Shalva's brother, prominent military commander who was appointed governor general of Kars in 1205/1206 and granted the titles of Atabek and Amira. He was killed by the Khwarezmians in the Battle of Garni.
- Pharadavla Akhaltsikheli (died 1244), Shalva's son; He fled to the Seljuk Sultanate of Rûm when the Mongols took control of Georgia, and joined the army of sultan Kaykhusraw II. Together with another refuge from Georgia, Dardin Sharvashisdze, he commanded Georgian auxiliaries at the Battle of Köse Dağ in 1243 where the Seljuk Turks were crushed by the Mongol commander Bayju. Sharvashisdze was killed in action, and the sultan later had Pharadavla assassinated.
