= Mongol invasions of Georgia =

1220–1236 Mongol invasions of the Kingdom of Georgia

- Part of the Mongol invasions and conquests
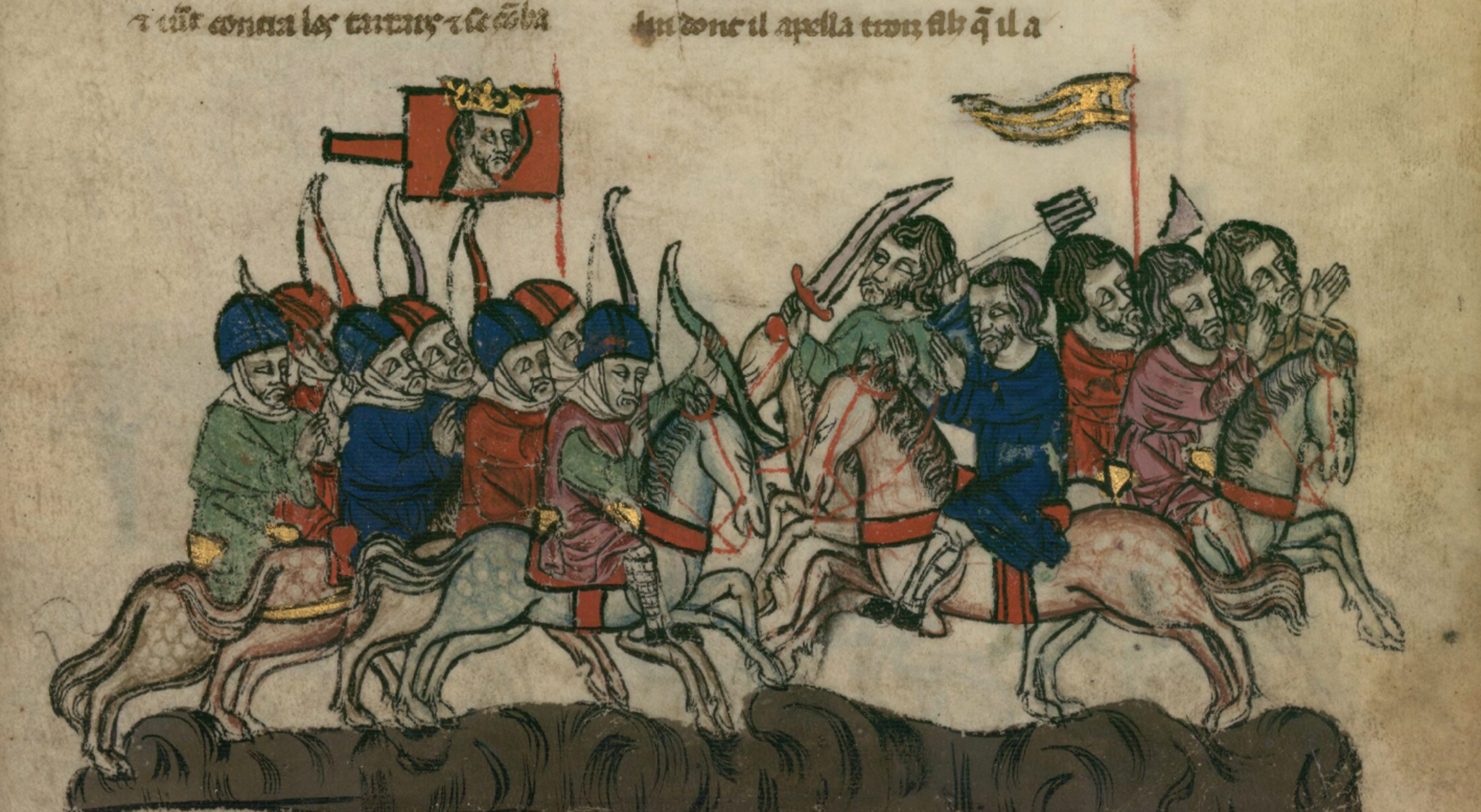
- A miniature depicting an attack of the Georgian king George IV Lasha on Mongols in 1220. La Flor des estoires de la terre d'Orient by Hayton of Corycus. King George is shown in blue garment on a white horse holding a whip.
Date	1220–1236
Location	Caucasus, eastern Anatolia, western Iran
Result	Mongol victory; Georgian–Mongolian treaty of 1239

Belligerents
Mongol Empire	Kingdom of Georgia

Commanders and leaders
Subutai; Jebe	(Kingdom of Georgia) George IV (Kingdom of Georgia) Rusudan

The Mongol Empire invaded and raided the Kingdom of Georgia—covering modern-day Georgia, Armenia, and much of the Caucasus—several times throughout the 13th century. The Mongols first appeared in the Caucasus in 1220 as generals Subutai and Jebe pursued Muhammad II of Khwarezm during the destruction of the Khwarezmian Empire. After a series of raids in which they defeated the combined Georgian and Armenian armies, Subutai and Jebe continued north to invade Kievan Rus'.

A full-scale Mongol conquest of the Caucasus and eastern Anatolia began in 1236, in which Kingdom of Georgia, the Sultanate of Rum, and the Empire of Trebizond were subjugated, the Armenian Kingdom of Cilicia and other Crusader states voluntarily accepted Mongol vassalage, and the Assassins were eliminated. Mongol rule in the Caucasus lasted until the late 1330s. During that period, King George V restored the kingdom of Georgia for a brief period before it finally disintegrated due to Timur's invasions of Georgia.

== Initial attacks ==
The Mongols made their first appearance in the Georgian possessions when this latter kingdom was still in its zenith, dominating most of the Caucasus. First contact occurred early in the fall of 1220, when approximately 20,000 Mongols led by Subutai and Jebe pursued the ousted Shah Muhammad II of the Khwarazmian dynasty to the Caspian Sea. With the consent of Genghis Khan, the two Mongol generals proceeded west on a reconnaissance mission. They thrust into Armenia, then under Georgian authority, and defeated some 10,000 Georgians and Armenians commanded by King George IV "Lasha" of Georgia and his atabeg (tutor) and amirspasalar (commander-in-chief) Ivane Mkhargrdzeli at the Battle of Khunan on the Kotman River. George IV was severely wounded in the chest. The Mongol commanders, however, were unable to advance further into the Caucasus at that time due to the demands of the war against the Khwarezmian Empire, and turned back south to Hamadan.

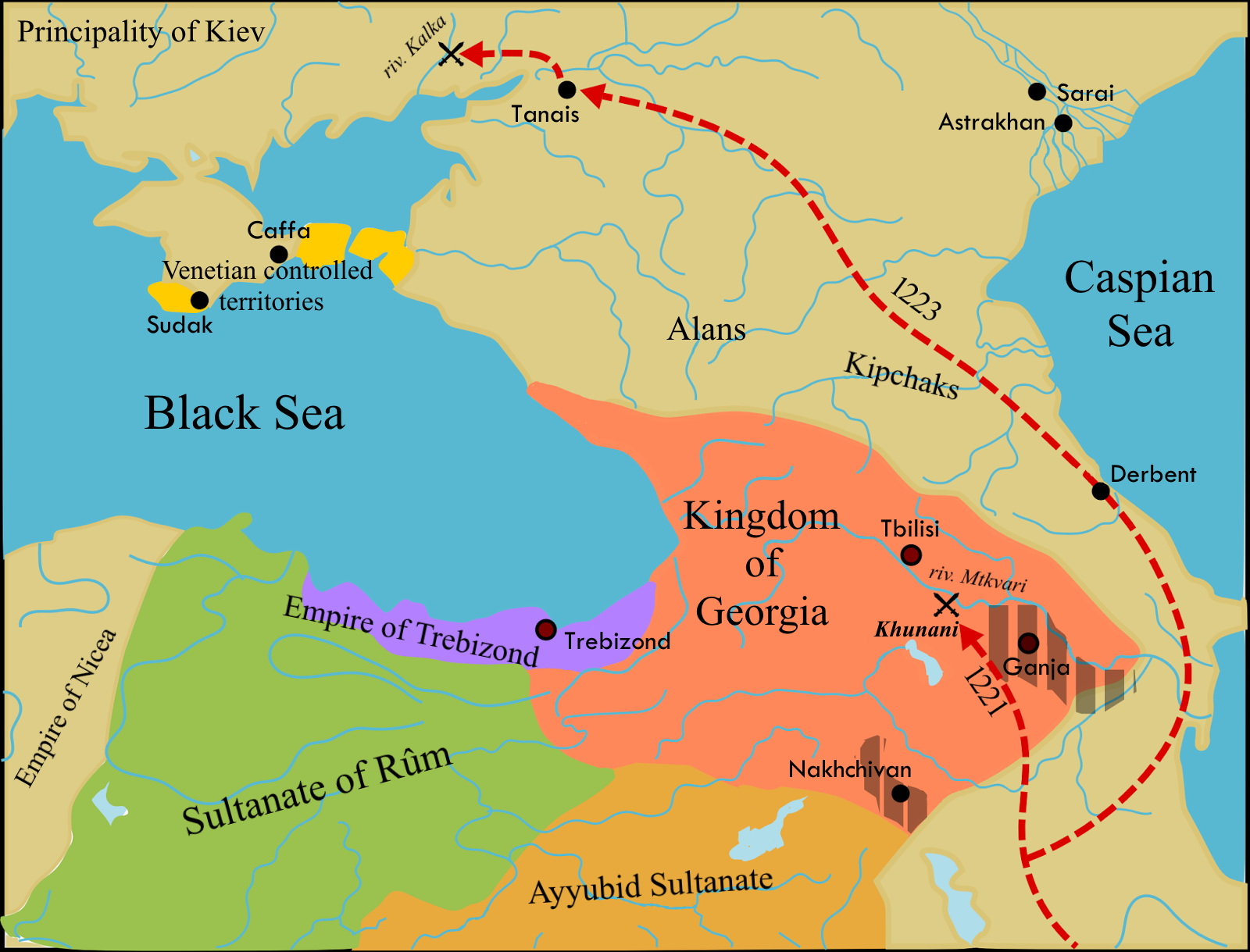
Mongol invasion of Georgia and battle of Khunan.

Once Khwarezmian resistance was all but mopped up, the Mongols returned in force in January 1221. Though King George IV was initially reluctant to give battle after his previous defeat, Jebe and Subutai forced him to take action by ravaging the countryside and killing his people. The ensuing battle at Bardav (Pardav; modern-day Barda, Azerbaijan) was another decisive Mongol victory, obliterating Georgia's field army. Though Georgia lay bare, the Mongols had come as a small reconnaissance and plundering expedition, not an army of conquest. Thus the Mongols marched to the north, plundering northeastern Armenia and Shirvan en route. This took them through the Caucasus into Alania and the South Russian steppes where the Mongols routed the Rus'-Kipchak armies at the Battle of the Kalka River (1223).

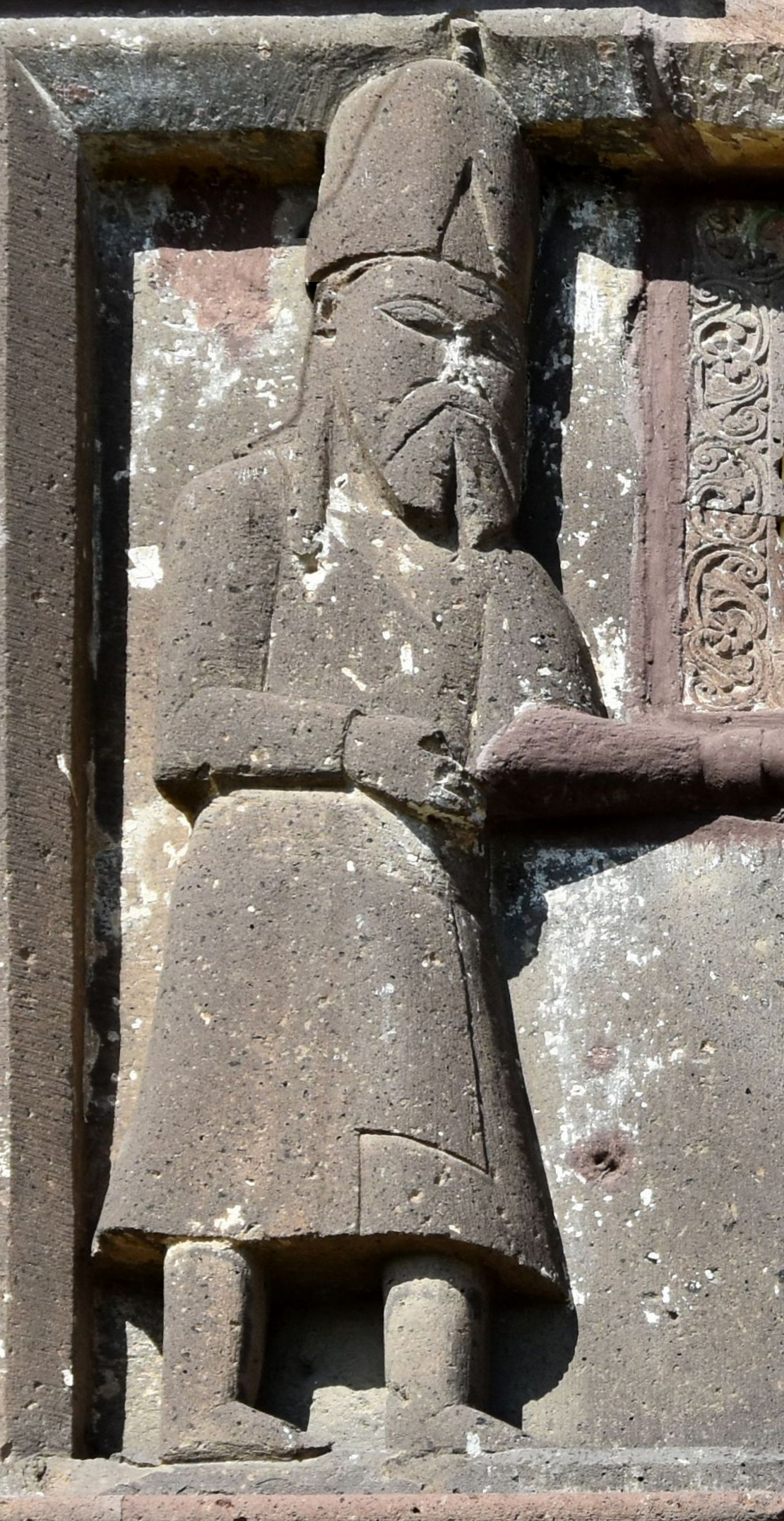
Ivane I Zakarian fought the Mongols from 1220 to 1227, as Atabeg and Amirspasalar (Commander-in-Chief of the army) of Georgia. Harichavank Monastery (1201).

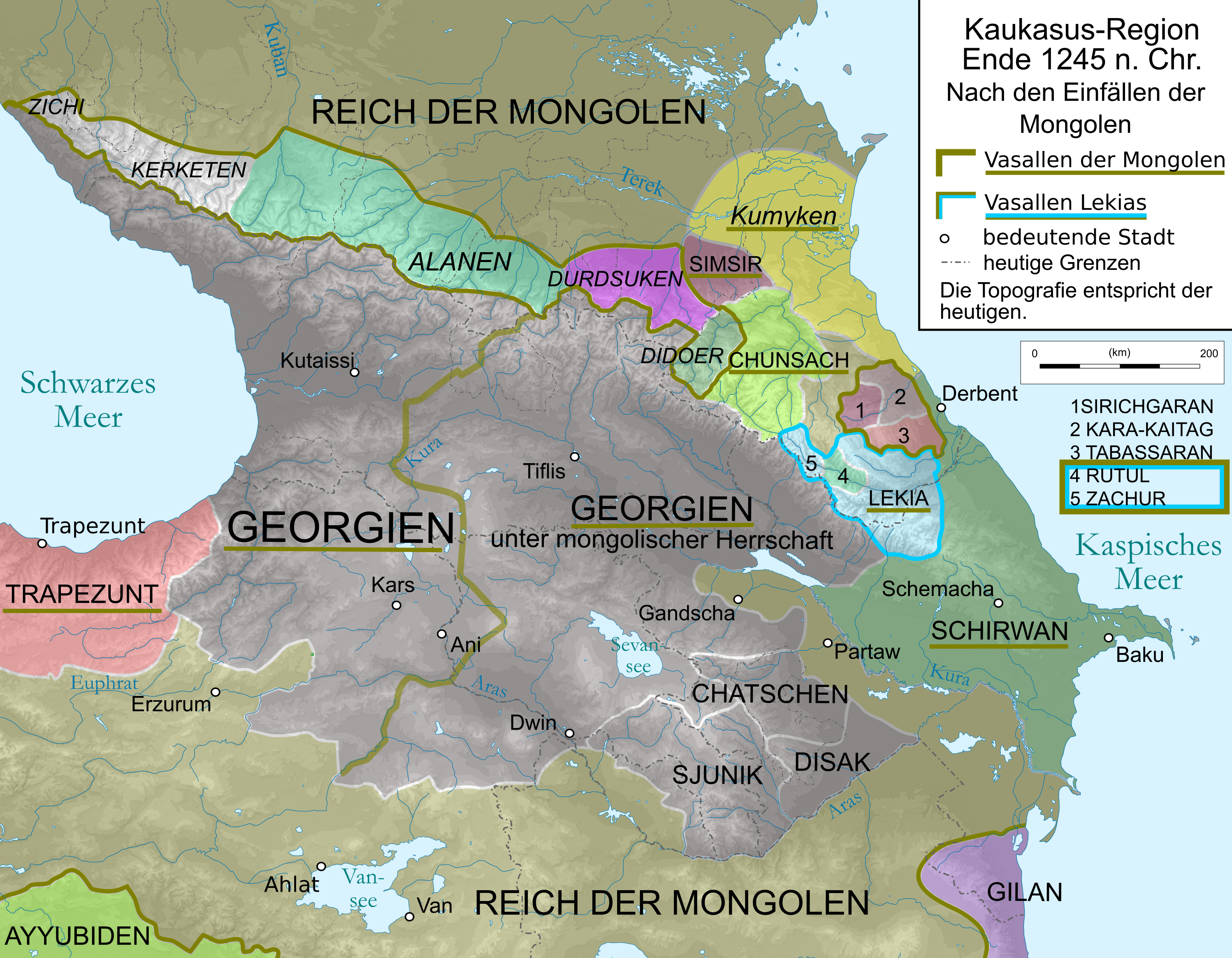
Kingdom of Georgia, 1245 AD.

These surprise attacks left the Georgians in confusion as to the identity of their attackers: the record of one contemporary chronicler indicates that he is unaware of the nature of the attackers and does not mention them by name. In 1223, when the Mongols had seemingly deferred their plans regarding Georgia, King George IV's sister and successor Queen Rusudan wrote in a letter to Pope Honorius III, that the Georgians had presumed the Mongols were Christians because they fought Muslims, but they had turned out to be pagans. The Mongol invasion also inadvertently altered the fate of the Fifth Crusade. Georgia had planned to send its splendid army to open up a second front in the north at the same time as the European crusaders invaded from the west. Because the Mongols annihilated the Georgian army, it could not help, and the European Crusaders spent critical time waiting inactively for their allies who would never come.

During the invasion of Transoxania in 1219, Genghis Khan used a Chinese catapult unit in battle, and they were used again in 1220 in Transoxania. The Chinese may have used the catapults to hurl gunpowder bombs, since they already had them by this time. In the 1239-1240 Mongol invasion of the North Caucasus, Chinese weapons were once again used.

== Mongol conquest of Georgia proper ==
The third and final invasion of the Caucasus by the Mongols took place in 1236. This offensive, which would prove the ruin of Georgia, was preceded by the devastating conflict with Jalal al-Din Mangburni, a refugee shah of Khwarezmia, who had demanded in 1225, that the Georgian government support his war against the Mongols. In the ensuing Khwarezmian attack, Tbilisi was captured in 1226, and much of the former strength and prosperity of the Kingdom of Georgia was destroyed, leaving the country largely defenseless in the face of the forthcoming Mongol conquests.

After the death of Jalal al-Din Mangburni in 1231, Mongols' hands were finally free and the prominent Mongol commander Chormaqan led, in 1236, a large army against Georgia and its vassal Armenian princedoms. Most of the Georgian and Armenian nobles, who held military posts along the frontier regions, submitted without any serious opposition or confined their resistance to their castles while others preferred to flee to safer areas. Their submission required performing military service for the Mongols. Queen Rusudan had to evacuate Tbilisi for Kutaisi and some people went into the mountainous part of Georgia, leaving eastern Georgia (non-mountain part) in the hands of Atabeg Avag Mkhargrdzeli and Egarslan Bakurtsikheli, who made peace with the Mongols and agreed to pay them tribute. The only Georgian great noble to have resisted was Ivane I Jaqeli, prince of Samtskhe. His extensive possessions were fearfully devastated, and finally Ivane had to, with the consent of Queen Rusudan, submit to the invaders in 1238. In 1239, Chormaqan conquered Ani and Kars in Greater Armenia. The Mongol armies chose not to cross the Likhi Range in pursuit of the Georgian queen, leaving western Georgia relatively spared of the rampages. Rusudan attempted to gain support from Pope Gregory IX, but without any success. Atabeg Avag arranged her submission in 1243, and Georgia officially acknowledged the Great Khan as its overlord. The country was forced to pay an annual tribute of 50,000 gold pieces and support the Mongols with an army.

== Mongol rule ==
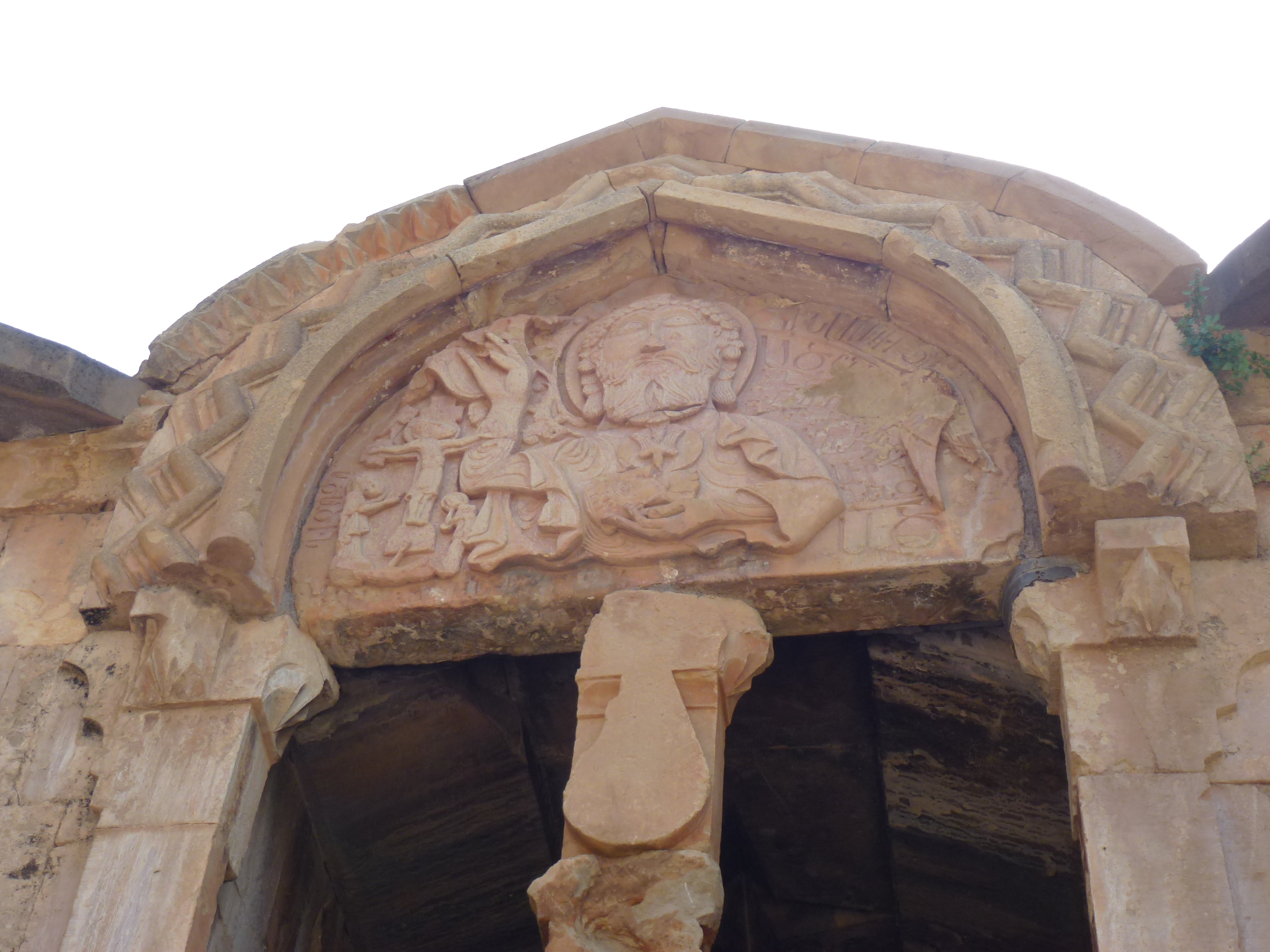
The sculpture in Noravank, made by the architect Momik, demonstrating God, depicted as ethnically Mongolian, thanks to which the monastery was not destroyed.

The Mongols created the Vilayet of Gurjistan, which included Georgia and the whole South Caucasus, where they ruled indirectly, through the Georgian monarch, the latter to be confirmed by the Great Khan upon his accession. With the death of Rusudan in 1245, an interregnum began during which the Mongols divided the Caucasus into eight tumens. Exploiting the complicated issue of succession, the Mongols had the Georgian nobles divided into two rival parties, each of which advocated their own candidate to the crown. These were David VII "Ulu", an illegitimate son of George IV, and his cousin David VI "Narin", son of Rusudan. After a failed plot against the Mongol rule in Georgia (1245), Güyük Khan made, in 1247, both pretenders co-kings, in eastern and western parts of the kingdom respectively. The system of tumens was abolished, but the Mongols closely watched the Georgian administration in order to secure a steady flow of taxes and tributes from the subject peoples, who were also pressed into the Mongol armies. Georgians attended all major campaigns of the Ilkhanate and aristocrats' sons served in the Kheshig.

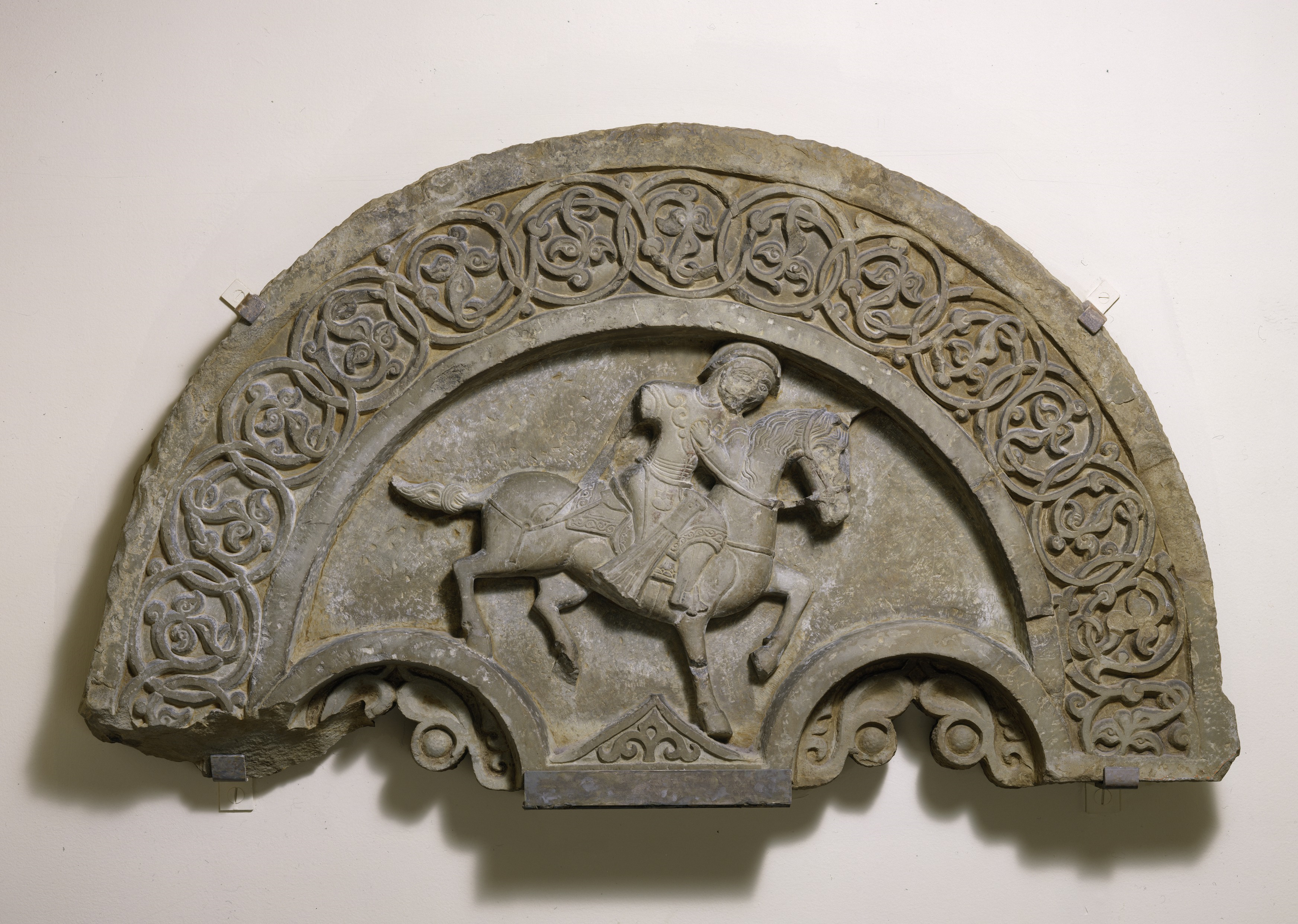
Mongol horserider with "cloud collar", House of Ahmad and Ibrahim, Kubachi in the Caucasus, second half 14th century CE

Large Georgian contingents fought under the Mongol banners at Alamut (1256), Baghdad (1258), Ain Jalut (1260) and elsewhere, losing tens of thousands of soldiers while Georgia, and the Caucasus in general, was left without native defenders against the Mongol forces dispatched to suppress spontaneous revolts erupting in protest to heavy taxation and the onerous burden of military service. Ironically, in the Battle of Köse Dag (1243), where the Mongols crushed the Seljuks of Rum, at least 3,000 Georgian auxiliaries fought in the Mongol ranks, while the Georgian prince Pharadavla Akhaltsikheli was a commander in the Seljuk army. According to Benedict of Poland, some Georgians living under the Mongols were quite respected because they were considered a strong and warlike people.

In 1256, Georgia was placed under the Mongol empire of the Ilkhanate, centered on Persia (Iran). In 1259–1260, Georgian nobles, led by David Narin, rose against the Mongols, and succeeded in separating Imereti (western Georgia) from the Mongol-controlled eastern Georgia. David Ulu decided to join his cousin in rebellion, but was defeated near Gori and was once again forced to submit to Mongol rule. Beginning in 1261, the Caucasus became a theater of the series of conflicts fought between the IlKhanids and another Mongol empire of Golden Horde centered in the lower Volga with its capital at Sarai.

Georgia's unity was shattered; the nobles were encouraged to rise against the crown that naturally facilitated the Mongol control of the country. In 1266, Prince Sargis Jakeli of Samtskhe (with Akhaltsikhe as the capital) was granted special protection and patronage by Abaqa Khan, thus winning virtual independence from the Georgian crown. The next (eastern) Georgian king Demetrius II, "the Devoted" (1259–1289), through maneuvering in the intrigues that divided the Ilkhanids, attempted to revive his country, but suspected in an abortive coup against Arghun Khan, he had, to save Georgia from invasion, agreed to surrender and be executed. Then the kingdom fell into near anarchy. While western Georgia maintained a perilous independence from the Ilkhanids, eastern Georgia suffered from both heavy tribute and unstable political situation. In religious matters the Mongols were generally tolerant even though many churches and monasteries were taxed. An uprising by David VIII (1292–1310), though long-lasting, did not lead to the liberation of Georgia, but prompted a series of devastating punitive expeditions. The Mongols attempted to retain the control over the country by raising and bringing down the rival monarchs and by inciting the civil strife, but their influence over Georgia gradually weakened with the disintegration of the Ilkhanid power in Persia.

== Revival and collapse of the kingdom of Georgia ==
There was a brief period of reunion and revival under George V the Brilliant (1299–1302, 1314–1346). With the support of Chupan, ulus-beg of the Ilkhanate, George V eliminated his domestic opponents who remained independent of the Georgian crown. George V conquered Imereti, uniting all of the Georgian Kingdom before the death of the last effective Ilkhan Abu Sa'id Bahadur. In 1319 George V and the Mongols suppressed the rebellion of the Ilkhanid governor of Georgia, Qurumushi. Presumably due to the internal strife between the Mongol khanates and Ilkhanid generals, almost all Mongol troops in Georgia withdrew in 1320s. The Ilkhan Abu Sa'id Bahadur (d.1335) exempted Ani and the neighbouring districts of Georgia from any kind of taxes. In a 1321 letter, Bishop of Avignon mentions schismatic people (Georgians) who are a part of the Tatar Empire (Ilkhanate).

In the year 1327, in Persia, the most dramatic event of the reign of the IlKhan Abu Sa'id Bahadur occurred, namely the disgrace and execution of the once all-powerful minister Chupan. This was a heavy blow for George V, who lost his patron at the Mongol court. Chupan's son Mahmud, who commanded the Mongol garrison in Georgia, was arrested by his own troops and executed. Subsequently, Iqbalshah, son of Kutlushah, was appointed to be the Mongol governor of Georgia (Gurjistan). In 1330-31, George V the Brilliant annexed Imereti, uniting all of Georgia in the process. Therefore, four years prior the last effective Ilkhan Abu Sa'id Bahadur's demise, two kingdoms of Georgia united again. In 1334, the post of the Ilkhanid governor in Georgia was given to Shaykh Hasan of the Jalayir by Abu Sai'd Bahadur.

Before the Timurids, much of Kingdom of Georgia's former vassals were still under the Mongol Jalayirids and Chobanids. The eight onslaughts of the Turco-Mongol conqueror Timur between 1386 and 1403 dealt a great blow to the Georgian kingdom. Its unity was finally shattered and, by 1491, Georgia was shattered into a number of petty kingdoms and principalities, which throughout the Early modern period struggled to maintain their independence against Safavid and Ottoman domination until Georgia was finally annexed by the Russian Empire in 1801.

== See also ==
- Ilkhanate
- Mongol invasion of Persia
