= Zakare II Zakarian =

Armenian general (died 1212)

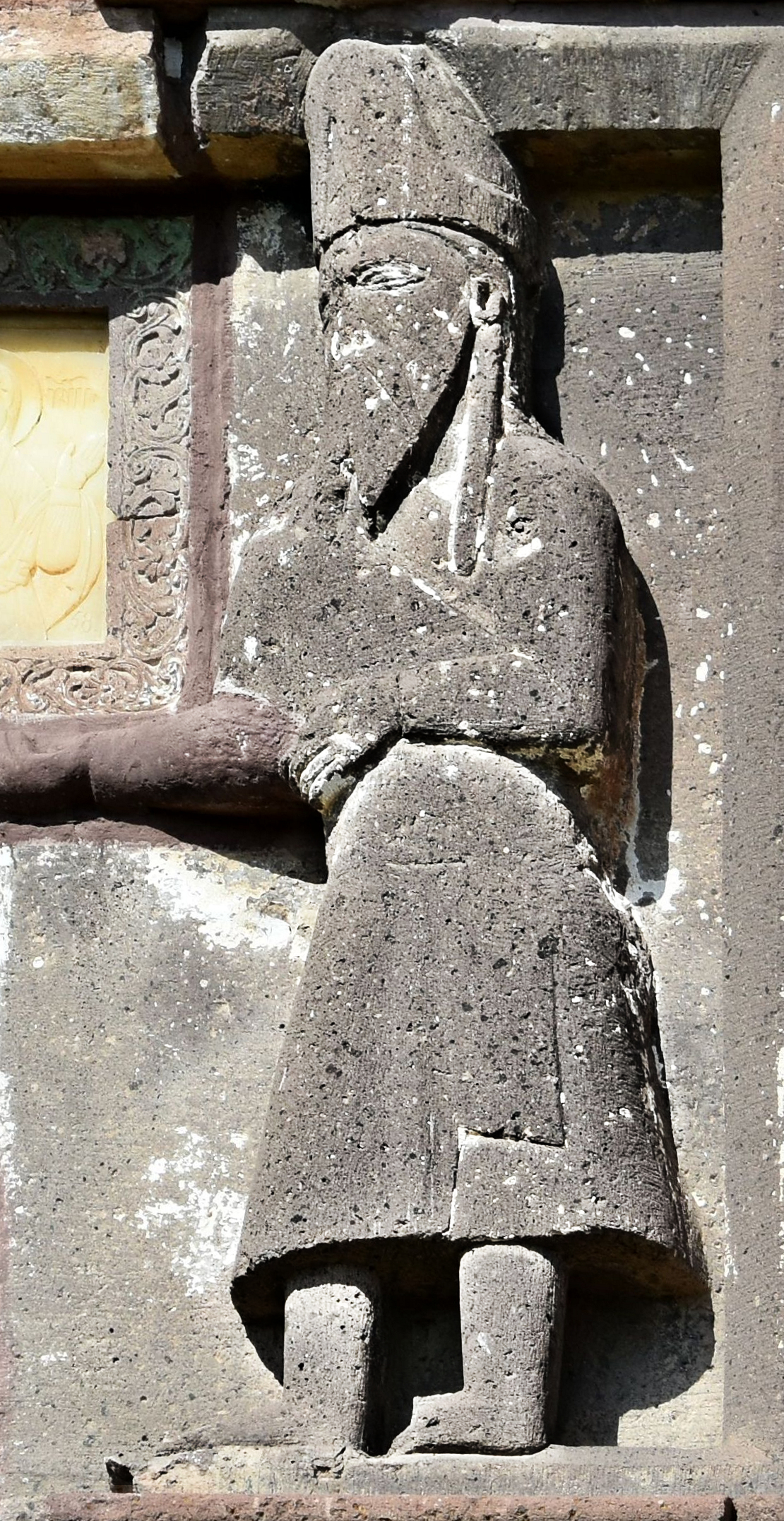
- Zakare on the east facade at Harichavank, , 1201. He wears the contemporary costume, with tall sharbush hat and stiff kaftan.

Amirspasalar
- In office 1191–1212
- Monarch: Tamar of Georgia
- Preceded by: Chiaber
- Succeeded by: Ivane I Zakarian

Mandaturtukhutsesi
- In office 1195–1202/03
- Monarch: Tamar of Georgia
- Preceded by: Chiaber
- Succeeded by: Shalva Akhaltsikheli

Personal details
- Born: Unknown
- Died: 1212
- Resting place: Sanahin Monastery
- Children: Shahnshah Zakarian
- Parent(s): Sargis Zakarian (father); Saakdukht Artsruni (mother)

Military service
- Battles/wars: Battle of Shamkor; Battle of Basiani; Siege of Kars (1206–1207); Georgian campaign against the Eldiguzids

Zakare II Zakarian (Armenian: Զաքարե Զաքարյան or Զաքարե Երկայնաբազուկ), also known as Zakaria II Mkhargrdzeli (Georgian: ზაქარია მხარგრძელი), was an Armenian prince and a Court official of the Kingdom of Georgia holding the office of amirspasalar (Commander-in-Chief) of the Georgian army for Queen Tamar of Georgia, during the late 12th and early 13th centuries. He was a member of the Zakarid dynasty, and ruler of feudal lands in the Kingdom of Georgia.

== Biography ==
Zakare along with his father Sargis supported the rebellion of Prince Demna and the Orbelian family in 1177, however they soon sided with George III and fought for the monarchy against the insurgents. The rebellion was suppressed, and King George III elevated the Zakarid–Mkhargrdzeli family.

Following the death of George III, Queen Tamar elevated Sargis Zakarian (Mkhargrdzeli)— a well-born valorous man, well-trained in battle — to the office of Amirspasalar (Lord High Constable) and granted him possessions over Lori (which was deprived of from Kubasar). She gave presents to his elder son, Zakare, and his younger son, Ivane, and she made him a member of the Darbazi. During a revolt of Queen Tamar's disgraced husband, George the Rus', around 1191, Zakare Zakarian (Mkhargrdzeli) was one of the few nobles who remained loyal to the queen. Tamar gradually expanded her own power-base and elevated her loyal nobles to high positions at the court, most notably the Mkhargrdzeli.

In the ninth year of Tamar's reign, the Mandaturtukhutsesi and Amirspasalar Zakaria (Zakare) Mkhargrdzeli and his brother Ivane the atabeg took Dvin in 1193. They also took Gelakun, Bjni, Amberd, and Bargushat, and all the towns along Araxes basin, up to the Khodaafarin bridge. Around the year 1199, a Georgian army under Zakare's command took the city of Ani from Shadaddid control, and in 1201, Tamar gave it to him as a fief. Zakare commanded the Georgian army for almost three decades, achieving major victories at Shamkor in 1195 and Basian in 1203 and leading raids into northern Iran who played a significant role.

In 1208/1209, the Georgian army marched to Ahlat under the command of his brother Ivane to help the Armenian rebels against the Ayyubids. On the way, they captured Archesh and then marched to Ahlat. The city was besieged, but Ivane Mkhargrdzeli's horse fell into a ditch while encircling the city. The defenders of Ahlat saw this, rushed out and captured Ivan. When Zakare, learned about his brother's capture, he was furious and told the Ayyubids.

...If you dare to take my brother out of the city, or do something to him, I will Conquer the land of your country and give it to Georgian Kingdom and I'm gonna kill all of you...

The Ayyubids demanded a Thirty Years' Truce in exchange for Ivan's release.

In 1210, Zakare led the Eldiguzid campaign of Tamar of Georgia, devastating Tabriz, Khoy, Ardabil and reaching as far as Qazvin.

== Monastic contributions ==
Zakare left several bilingual inscriptions across the Armeno-Georgian borderlands and built several churches and forts, such as the Harichavank Monastery and Akhtala Monastery in northern Armenia. After Zakaria's death, his holdings were inherited by the aging Ivane, who had given Ani to his nephew Shahnshah, son of Zakare.

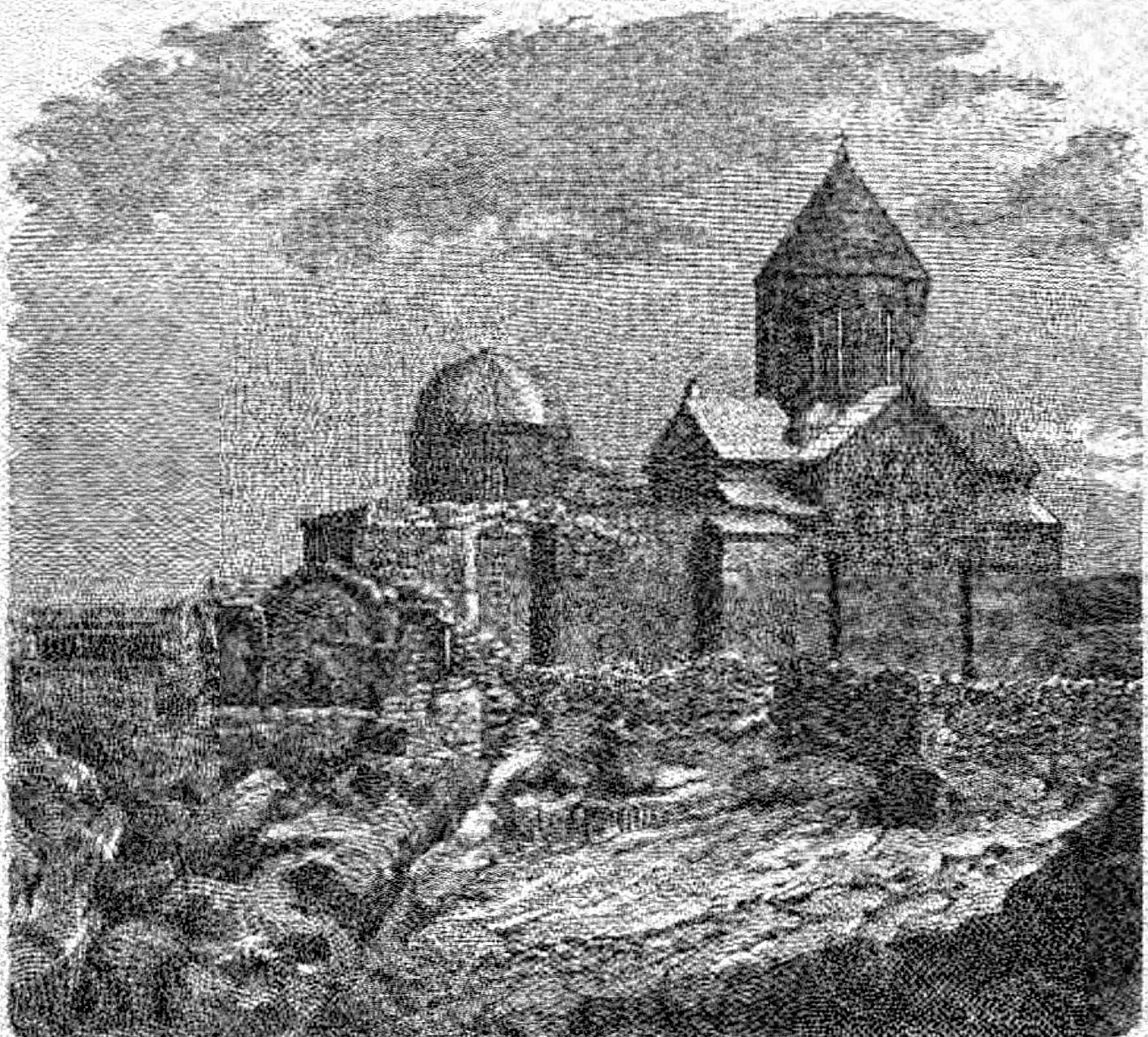
Church of Saint Elia, Kizkale in Ani, built by Zakare circa 1200.

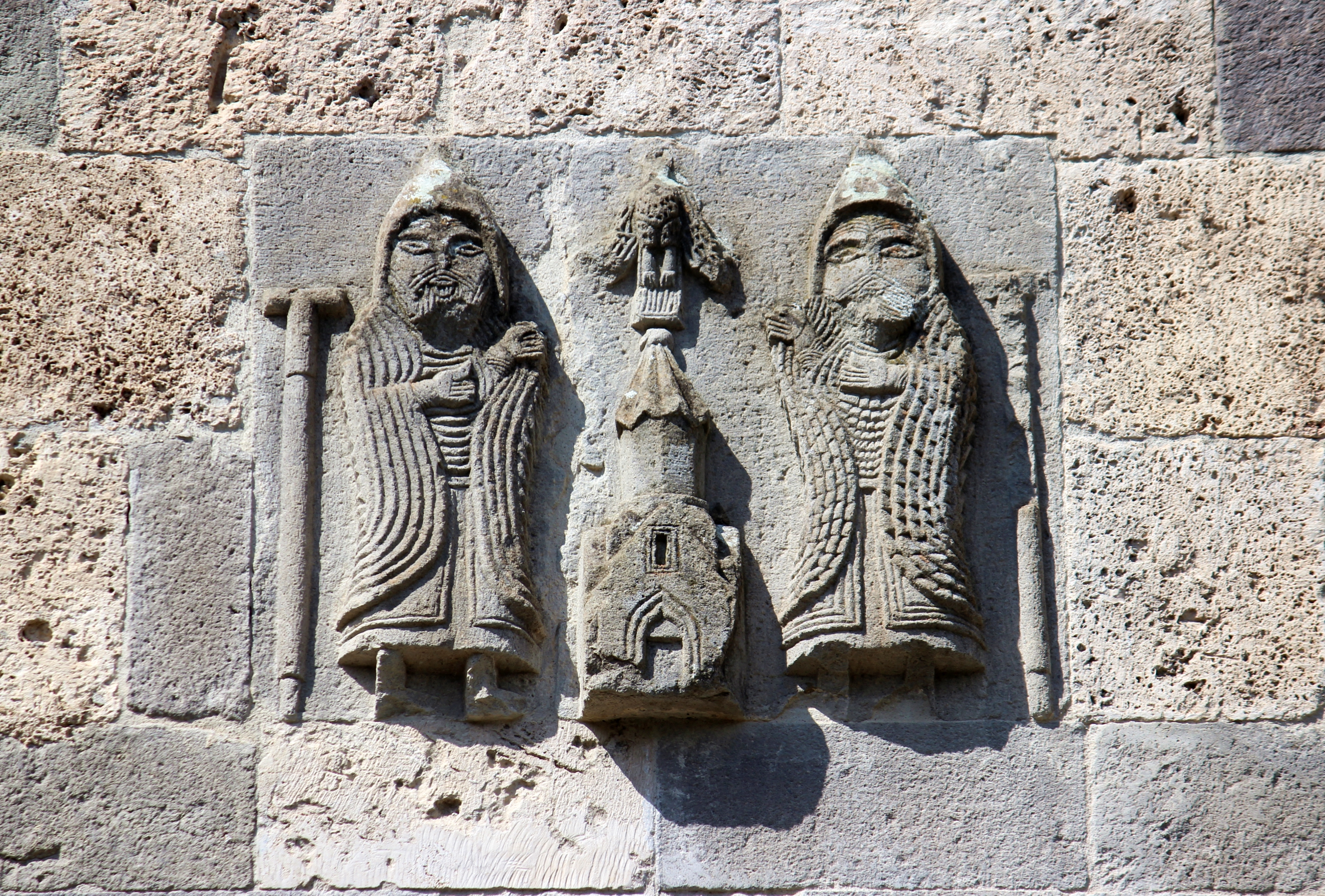
High-relief depiction commemorating the patronage of the Zakaryan brothers (Zakare II Zakarian and Ivane), on the upper east exterior wall of S. Astvatatsin Church, Haghartsin Monastery.

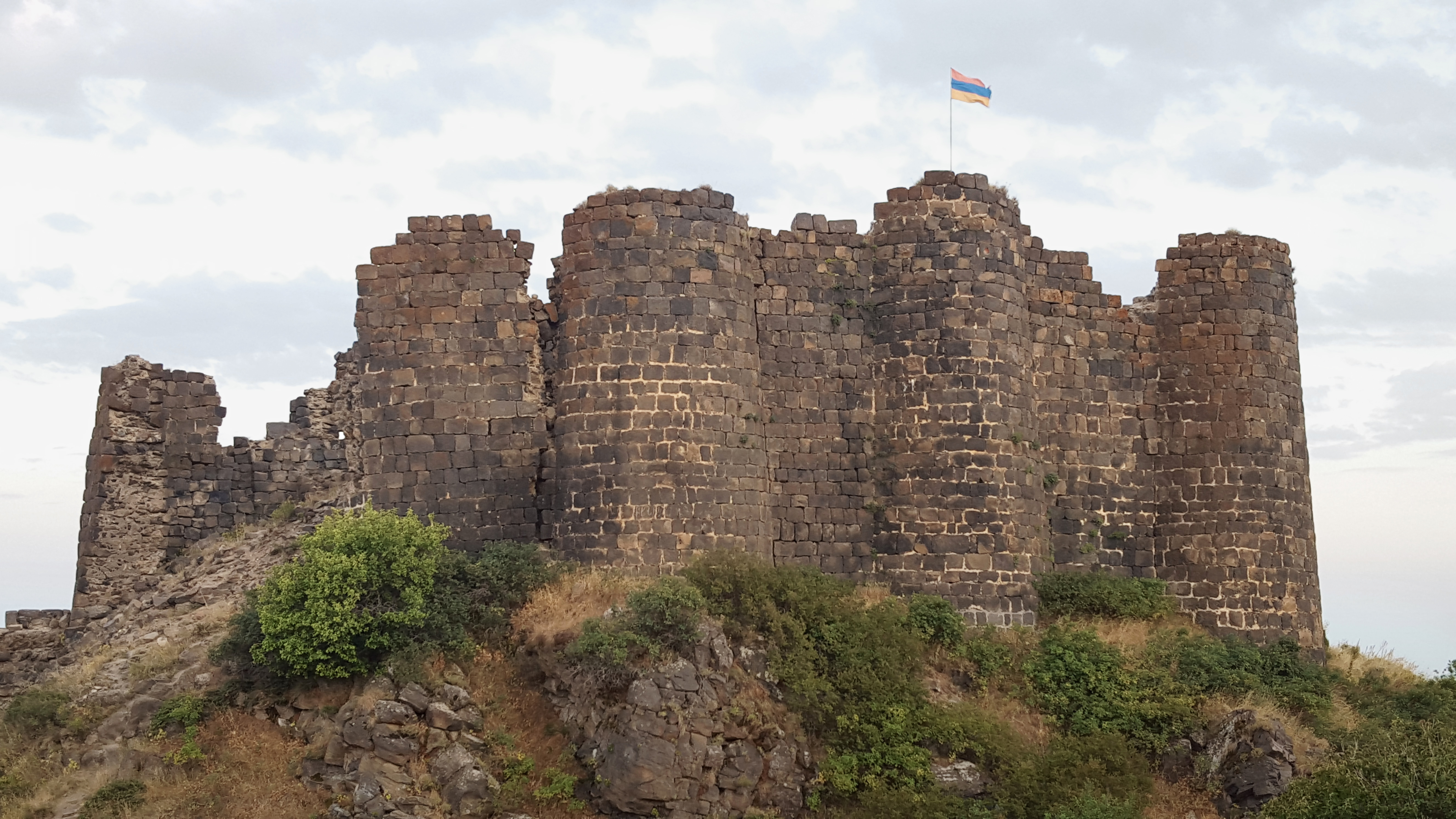
Amberd castle was conquered from the Seljuq Turks in 1197 by Zakare Zakarian, and reinforced under the Zakarians thereafter.

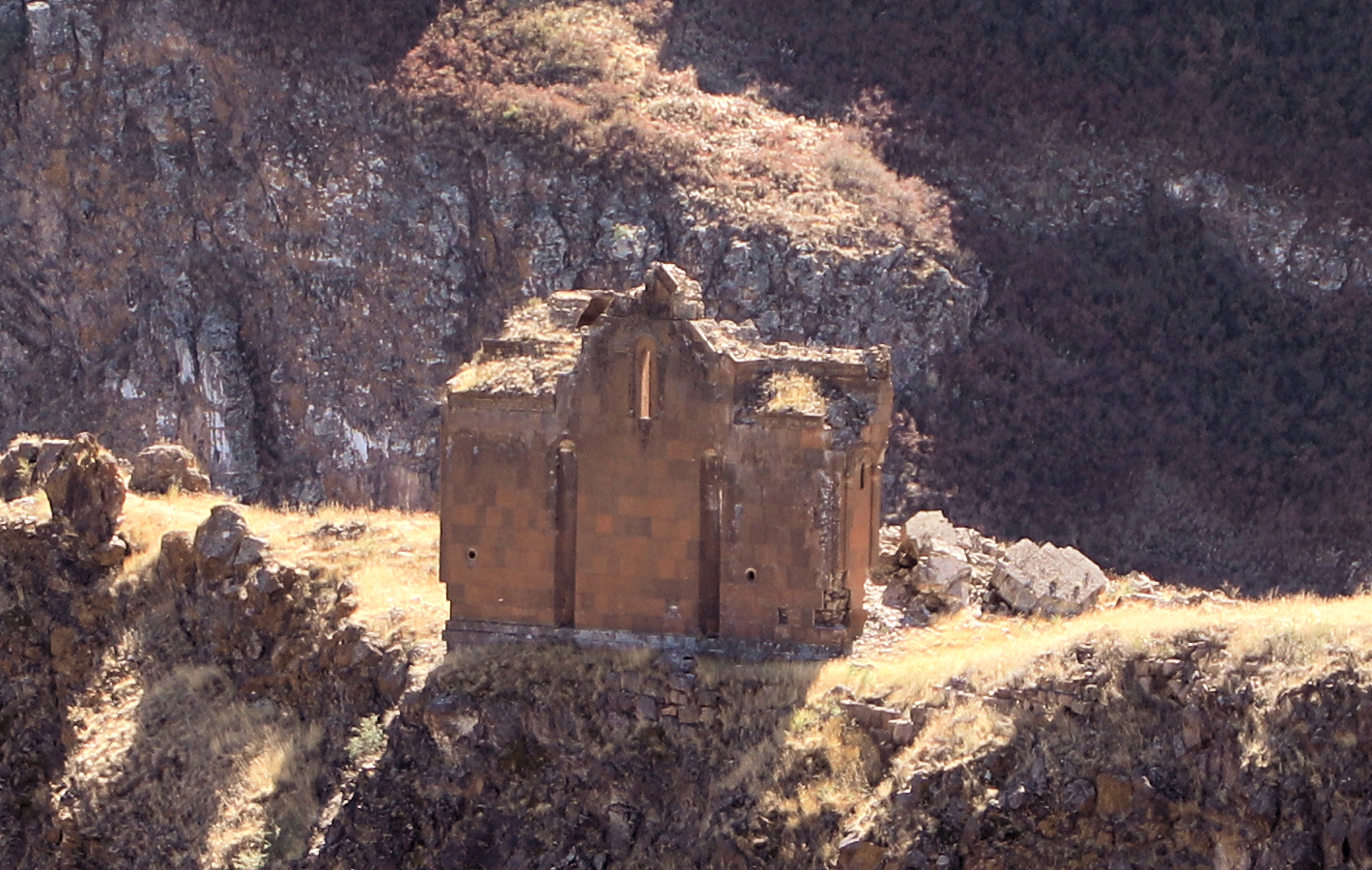
Zakare's church built in Ani by Zakare II Zakarian circa 1200

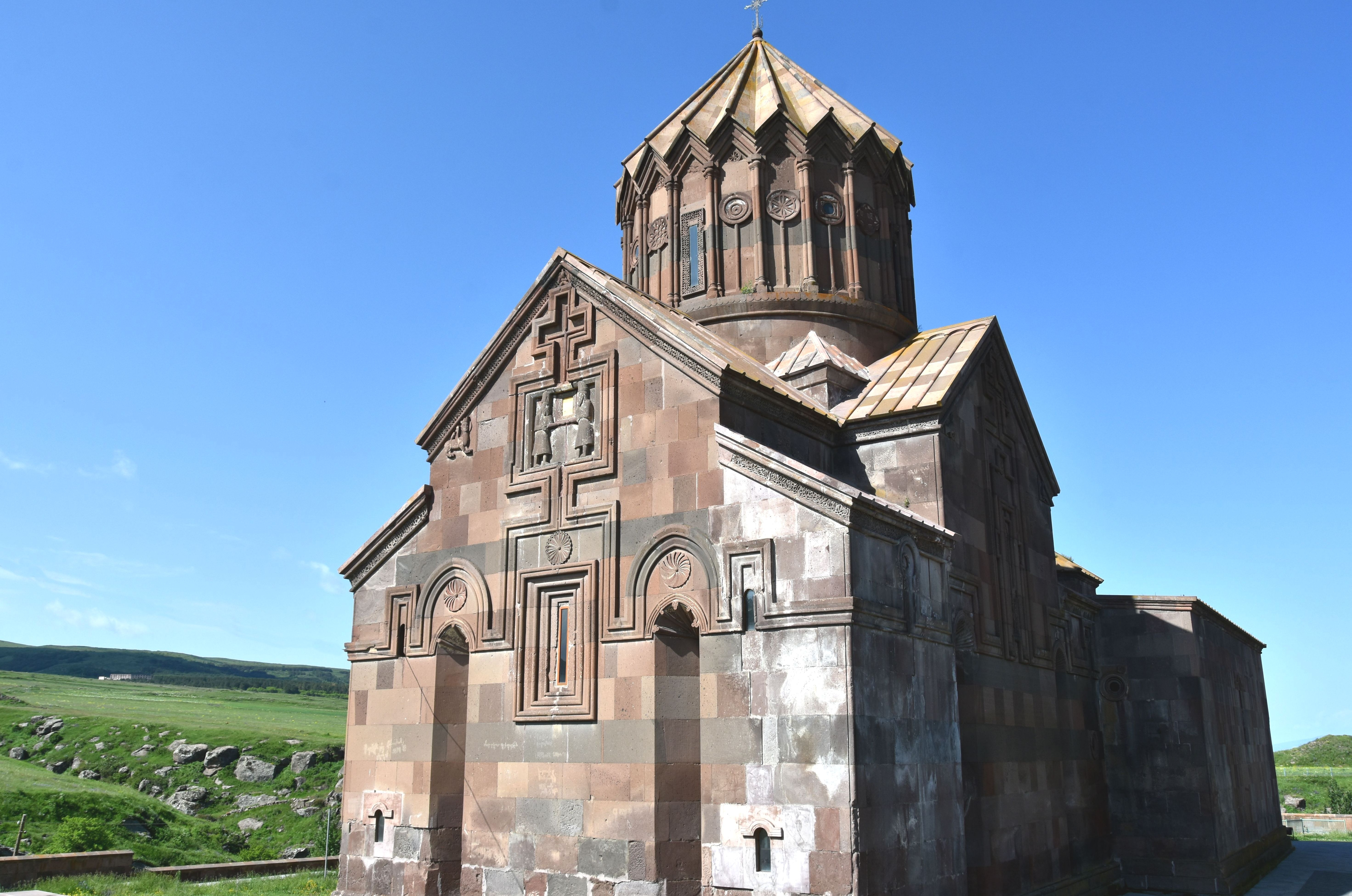
The cathedral of Harichavank was built by Zakare II Zakarian

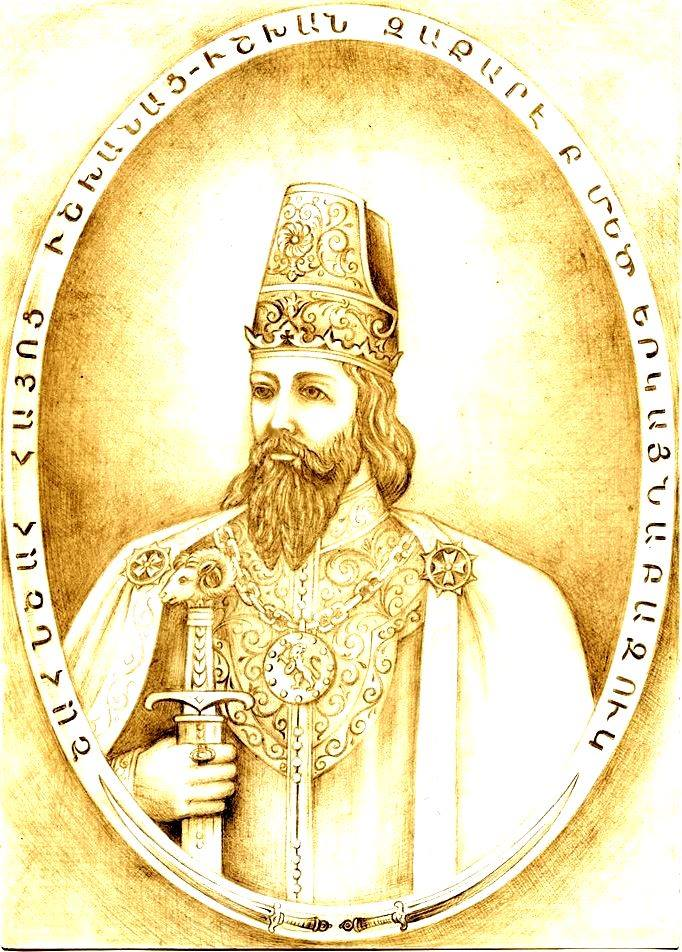
Portrait of Zakare II, by a descendant of the Zakarians, Rudolf Arghutyan
