= List of battles involving Georgia (country) =

This is a list of the battles in the history of the country of Georgia.

This list only includes battles which have corresponding pages in Wikipedia.

The list gives the name, the date, the combatants, and the result of the battles following this legend:

Georgian victory
Georgian defeat
Another result (*e.g. a treaty or peace without a clear result,
status quo ante bellum, result of civil or internal conflict, result unknown or indecisive)
Ongoing conflict

== Antiquity ==
Date	Battle	Modern Location	Conflict	Combatant 1	Combatant 2	Result
65 BC	Battle of the Pelorus	Aragvi River, Mtskheta-Mtianeti, Georgia (Georgia (country))	Caucasian campaign of Pompey	Kingdom of Iberia	Roman Republic	Defeat
51 AD	Siege of Garni	Kotayk Province, Armenia	Iberian–Armenian War	Kingdom of Iberia	Kingdom of Armenia; Roman Empire	Victory: Rhadamistus ascended on the Armenian throne

== Early medieval fragmentation ==
Date	Battle	Modern Location	Conflict	Combatant 1	Combatant 2	Result
541	Siege of Petra	Tsikhisdziri, Adjara, Georgia (Georgia (country))	Lazic War	Sassanid Empire; Lazica	Byzantine Empire	Victory
549	Siege of Petra	Tsikhisdziri, Adjara, Georgia (Georgia (country))	Lazic War	Byzantine Empire; Lazica	Sassanid Empire	Defeat
550	Battle of Mukhurisi	Imereti, Georgia (Georgia (country))	Lazic War	Byzantine Empire; Lazica	Sassanid Empire	Victory
550	Battle of Rioni	Imereti, Georgia (Georgia (country))	Lazic War	Byzantine Empire; Lazica	Sassanid Empire	Victory
551	Siege of Petra	Tsikhisdziri, Adjara, Georgia (Georgia (country))	Lazic War	Byzantine Empire; Lazica	Sassanid Empire	Victory
551	Battle of Tsikhegoji (Note: Archaepolis)	Nokalakevi, Mingrelia, Georgia (Georgia (country))	Lazic War	Byzantine Empire; Lazica	Sassanid Empire	Victory
553	Battle of Telephis–Ollaria	Samtredia Municipality, Imereti, Georgia (Georgia (country))	Lazic War	Byzantine Empire; Lazica	Sassanid Empire	Defeat
555	Siege of Phasis	Poti, Samegrelo-Zemo Svaneti Georgia (Georgia (country))	Lazic War	Byzantine Empire; Lazica	Sassanid Empire	Victory
556	Battle of Tsakhar	Chkhalta, Kodori Valley, Abkhazia, Georgia (Georgia (country))	Misimian revolt	Misimian rebels	Byzantine Empire	Defeat
627-628	Siege of Tbilisi	Tbilisi, Georgia (Georgia (country))	Byzantine–Sasanian War of 602–628	Sasanian Iberia; Sasanian Empire	Byzantine Empire; Western Turkic Khaganate (retreated) Chosroid Dynasty	Defeat • End of the Sasanian Iberia
737	Siege of Anakopia	New Athos, Abkhazia, Georgia (Georgia (country))	Umayyad invasion of Georgia	Principality of Iberia; Principality of Abkhazia	Umayyad Caliphate	Victory
842	Battle of Rekha	Gori Municipality, Shida Kartli, Georgia (Georgia (country))	Muhammad ibn Khalid al-Shaybani's campaign in the Caucasus	Emirate of Tbilisi Principality of Kakheti	Abbasid Caliphate: Arminiya; Kouropalatate of Tao-Klarjeti	Inconclusive
914	Siege of Queli	Queli, Ardahan Province, Turkey	Sajid invasion of Georgia	Kingdom of the Iberians	Sajid dynasty	Defeat
979	Battle of Pankaleia	Afyonkarahisar Province, Turkey	Rebellion of Bardas Skleros	Byzantine Empire; Kingdom of the Iberians	Bardas Skleros	Victory

== Kingdom of Georgia (1008–1490) ==
Date	Battle	Modern Location	Conflict	Combatant 1	Combatant 2	Result
1021	Battle of Shirimni	Childir, Turkey	Byzantine–Georgian war (1021–1022)	Kingdom of Georgia; Bagratid Armenia	Byzantine Empire	Defeat
1022	Battle of Svindax	Turkey	Byzantine–Georgian war (1021–1022)	Kingdom of Georgia	Byzantine Empire	Defeat
1038-1040	Siege of Tbilisi	Tbilisi, Georgia (Georgia (country))	Unification of the Georgian realm	Kingdom of Georgia: Duchy of Kldekari; Kingdom of Kakheti-Hereti	Emirate of Tbilisi	Inconclusive: Bagrat IV lifts the siege
1040	Battle of Tashir	Gagi Fortress, Georgia (Georgia (country))	Georgian–Shaddadid wars	Kingdom of Tashir-Dzoraget; Kingdom of Ani; Kingdom of Kapan; Kingdom of Georgia	Shaddadids	Victory
1042	Battle of Sasireti	Kaspi Municipality, Shida Kartli, Georgia (Georgia (country))	Georgian civil war of 1033-1058	Kingdom of Georgia; Varangians	Duchy of Kldekari; Byzantine Empire	Defeat
1046	Battle of Ganja	Ganja, Azerbaijan	Byzantine–Seljuk wars	Byzantine Empire; Duchy of Kldekari	Seljuk Empire	Defeat
1048	Battle of Kapetron	Pasinler District, Erzurum Province, Turkey	Byzantine–Seljuk wars	Byzantine Empire; Duchy of Kldekari	Seljuk Empire	Tactical victory
1074 (Note: Or 1075)	Battle of Partskhisi	On the Algeti river, Tetritsqaro Municipality, Kvemo Kartli, Georgia (Georgia (country))	Georgian–Seljuk wars	Kingdom of Georgia Kingdom of Kakheti-Hereti	Seljuk Empire	Victory: George II reclaims southern Georgian territories
1103	Siege of Zedazeni	Fortress of Zedazeni, Mtskheta Municipality, Mtskheta-Mtianeti, Georgia (Georgia (country))	Unification of the Georgian realm	Kingdom of Georgia	Kingdom of Kakheti-Hereti	Victory (Note: Kingdom of Kakheti-Hereti conclusively annexed to the Kingdom of Georgia in 1105)
1104	Battle of Ertsukhi	Eastern Georgia (Georgia (country))	Georgian–Seljuk wars	Kingdom of Georgia	Seljuk Empire	Victory
1110	Siege of Samshvilde	Tetritsqaro Municipality, Kvemo Kartli, Georgia (Georgia (country))	Georgian–Seljuk wars	Kingdom of Georgia	Seljuk Empire	Victory
1110	Battle of Trialeti	Kvemo Kartli, Georgia (Georgia (country))	Georgian–Seljuk wars	Kingdom of Georgia	Seljuk Empire	Victory
1115	Siege of Rustavi	Rustavi, Kvemo Kartli, Georgia (Georgia (country))	Georgian–Seljuk wars	Kingdom of Georgia	Seljuk Empire	Victory
1118	Battle of Rakhsi	On the Aras river, Armenia	Georgian–Seljuk wars	Kingdom of Georgia	Seljuk Empire	Victory
1120	Battle of Botora	Georgia (Georgia (country))	Georgian–Seljuk wars	Kingdom of Georgia	Seljuk Empire	Victory
1121	Battle of Didgori	Tbilisi, Georgia (Georgia (country))	Georgian–Seljuk wars	Kingdom of Georgia: Kipchak, Armenian, English, Frankish, and Alan mercenaries	Seljuk Empire; Sultanate of Rum; Artuqids; Beylik of Dilmaç; Banu Mazyad; Shaddadids; Emirate of Tbilisi	Victory: Beginning of the Georgian Golden Age
1122	Siege of Tbilisi	Tbilisi, Georgia (Georgia (country))	Georgian–Seljuk wars	Kingdom of Georgia	Emirate of Tbilisi Seljuk Empire	Victory: Reclamation of Tbilisi by the Georgians
1124	Siege of Ani	Ani, Kars Province, Turkey	Georgian–Seljuk wars	Kingdom of Georgia	Shaddadids Seljuk Empire	Victory
1124	Capture of Dmanisi	Dmanisi, Kvemo Kartli, Georgia (Georgia (country))	Georgian–Seljuk wars	Kingdom of Georgia	Seljuk Empire	Victory
1161	Siege of Ani	Ani, Kars Province, Turkey	Georgian–Seljuk wars	Kingdom of Georgia	Eldiguzids; Seljuk Empire; Shah-Armens; Artuqids; Emirate of Kars; Beylik of Dilmaç	Victory
1173	Siege of Derbent	Derbent, Dagestan, Russian Federation (Russia)	Caspian expeditions of the Rusʹ	Kingdom of Georgia: Shirvanshah	Rus' people Alans; Kipchaks	Victory
1174	Siege of Ani	Ani, Kars Province, Turkey	Georgian–Shaddadid wars Georgian–Seljuk wars	Kingdom of Georgia	Shaddadids Saltukids; Shah-Armens	Victory
1191	Battle of Niali	Niali Plain, Aspindza Municipality, Samtskhe-Javakheti, Georgia (Georgia (country))	Revolt of Yury Bogolyubsky	Kingdom of Georgia	Yury Bogolyubsky	Victory
1195	Battle of Shamkor	Shamkir, Azerbaijan	Georgian–Seljuk wars	Kingdom of Georgia Shirvanshahs	Eldiguzids	Victory
1196	Siege of Amberd	Amberd, Aragatsotn Province, Armenia	Georgian–Seljuk wars	Kingdom of Georgia	Shaddadids	Victory
1199	Siege of Ani	Ani, Kars Province, Turkey	Georgian–Seljuk wars Georgian–Shaddadid wars	Kingdom of Georgia	Shaddadids	Victory: Ani conclusively annexed to the Kingdom of Georgia; End of Shaddadids
1202	Battle of Basiani	Pasinler District, Erzurum Province, Turkey	Georgian–Seljuk wars	Kingdom of Georgia	Sultanate of Rum	Victory (Note: Ahlatshahs and Beylik of Dilmaç become vassal of the Kingdom of Georgia)
1206–1207	Siege of Kars	Kars Province, Turkey	Georgian–Seljuk wars	Kingdom of Georgia	Emirate of Kars	Victory: Kars annexed to the Kingdom of Georgia
1208-1209	Capture of Archesh	Erciş, Van Province, Turkey	Ayyubid–Georgian wars	Kingdom of Georgia	Ayyubid dynasty	Victory
1210	Capture of Tabriz	Tabriz, East Azerbaijan province, Iran	Georgian campaign against Eldiguzids	Kingdom of Georgia: Zakarids	Eldiguzids	Victory
1213	Siege of Ganja	Ganja, Azerbaijan	Georgian–Seljuk wars	Kingdom of Georgia	Eldiguzids	Victory (Note: Last battle between Eldiguzids and Kingdom of Georgia)
1222	Battle of Khunan	Shamakhi District, Azerbaijan	Mongol invasions of Georgia	Kingdom of Georgia	Mongol Empire	Defeat
1225	Battle of Garni	Kotayk Province, Armenia	Khwarazmian–Georgian wars	Kingdom of Georgia	Khwarazmian Empire	Defeat
1228	Battle of Bolnisi	Bolnisi Municipality, Kvemo Kartli, Georgia (Georgia (country))	Khwarazmian–Georgian wars	Kingdom of Georgia	Khwarazmian Empire: Kipchaks	Defeat
1243	Battle of Köse Dağ	Sivas Province, Turkey	Mongol conquest of Anatolia	Mongol Empire (Kingdom of Georgia) Georgian mercenaries	Sultanate of Rum (Kingdom of Georgia) Georgian auxiliaries	Mongol victory
1258	Siege of Baghdad	Baghdad, Iraq	Mongol invasions and conquests	Ilkhanate; Kingdom of Georgia	Abbasid Caliphate	Victory: The Georgians breached Baghdad's walls, opened the gates for the Mongols, and contributed to the city's capture.
1260	Battle of Ain Jalut	Jezreel Valley, Israel	Mongol invasions of the Levant	Ilkhanate; Armenian Kingdom of Cilicia; Kingdom of Georgia	Mamluk Sultanate; Ayyubid emirs of Kerak and Hamah	Defeat
1260	Battle of Kvishkheti	Kvishkheti, Khashuri Municipality, Shida Kartli, Georgia (Georgia (country))	David Ulugh's rebellion	Kingdom of Georgia: Principality of Samtskhe	Ilkhanate Georgian nobles	Defeat
1277	Battle of Elbistan	Kahramanmaraş Province, Turkey	Mongol invasions of the Levant	Ilkhanate; Kingdom of Georgia; Armenian Kingdom of Cilicia; Sultanate of Rum	Mamluk Sultanate	Defeat
1281	Second Battle of Homs	Homs, Syria	Mongol invasions of the Levant	Ilkhanate; Armenian Kingdom of Cilicia; Kingdom of Georgia; Sultanate of Rum; Knights Hospitaller	Mamluk Sultanate	Defeat
1282	Siege of Trebizond	Trabzon, Turkey	Byzantine–Georgian wars	Kingdom of Western Georgia	Empire of Trebizond	Defeat
1299	Battle of Wadi al-Khaznadar	Homs, Syria	Mongol invasions of the Levant	Ilkhanate; Kingdom of Georgia; Armenian Kingdom of Cilicia	Mamluk Sultanate	Victory
1303	Battle of Marj al-Saffar	Ghabaghib, 25 miles south of Damascus, Syria	Mongol invasions of the Levant	Ilkhanate; Armenian Kingdom of Cilicia; Kingdom of Georgia	Mamluk Sultanate	Defeat
1386	Siege of Tbilisi	Tbilisi, Georgia (Georgia (country))	Timurid invasions of Georgia	Kingdom of Georgia	Timurid Empire	Defeat
1399	Battle of Alinja (1399)	Alinja, Julfa District, Nakhchivan Autonomous Republic, Azerbaijan	Timurid invasions of Georgia	Kingdom of Georgia	Timurid Empire	Victory
1403	Siege of Birtvisi	Tetritsqaro Municipality, Kvemo Kartli, Georgia (Georgia (country))	Timurid invasions of Georgia	Kingdom of Georgia	Timurid Empire	Defeat
1412	Battle of Chalagan	Çalağan-Güney, Lachin District, Azerbaijan	Turkoman invasions of Georgia	Shirvanshahs Kingdom of Georgia	Qara Qoyunlu	Defeat
1444	Battle of Akhaltsikhe	Akhaltsikhe, Samtskhe-Javakheti, Georgia (Georgia (country))	Turkoman invasions of Georgia	Kingdom of Georgia	Qara Qoyunlu	Victory (Note: Jahan Shah quietly left the battlefield at night and escaped to Tabriz)
1463	Battle of Chikhori	Terjola Municipality, Imereti, Georgia (Georgia (country))	Georgian Civil War (1463–1490)	Kingdom of Georgia	Kingdom of Imereti: Principality of Mingrelia; Principality of Guria; Principality of Abkhazia; Principality of Svaneti	Defeat: Imeretian secession from Georgia
1483	Battle of Aradeti	Kareli Municipality, Shida Kartli, Georgia (Georgia (country))	Georgian Civil War (1463–1490)	Kingdom of Georgia	Samtskhe-Saatabago	Defeat
1488	Battle of Enageti	Enageti, Kvemo Kartli, Georgia (Georgia (country))	Turkoman invasions of Georgia	Kingdom of Georgia	Aq Qoyunlu	Victory

== Royal triarchy and principalities (1490–1801) ==
Date	Battle	Modern Location	Conflict	Combatant 1	Combatant 2	Result
1501	Battle of Sharur	Sharur Azerbaijan	Safavid–Aq qoyunlu wars Turkoman invasions of Georgia (1407-1502)	Safavid Empire Kingdom of Kartli	Aq Qoyunlu	Victory (Note: Last battle with Turkomans)
1512	Battle of Mokhisi	Kareli Municipality, Shida Kartli, Georgia (Georgia (country))	Civil war	Bagrat III of Imereti	Prince Vakhtang Supported by: Kingdom of Kartli; Samtskhe-Saatabago	Victory of Bagrat
1520	Battle of Mokhisi	Kareli Municipality, Shida Kartli, Georgia (Georgia (country))	War of the Kakhetian Succession	Principality of Guria	Kingdom of Kartli	Gurian victory (Note: Kingdom of Kartli recognizes the ascension of Gurian-supported Levan of Kakheti to the throne.)
1522	Battle of Teleti	Gardabani Municipality, Kvemo Kartli, Georgia (Georgia (country))	Georgian–Safavid wars	Kingdom of Kartli	Safavid Empire	Defeat
1535	Battle of Murjakheti	Akhalkalaki Municipality, Samtskhe-Javakheti, Georgia (Georgia (country))	Imereti–Samtskhe war	Kingdom of Imereti; Principality of Mingrelia; Principality of Guria	Samtskhe-Saatabago	Victory (Note: Principality of Samtskhe is annexed by Imereti)
1543	Battle of Karagak	Turkey	Georgian–Ottoman wars	Kingdom of Imereti Principality of Guria	Ottoman Empire	Victory • Death of Musa Pasha
1545	Battle of Sokhoista	Pasinler District, Erzurum Province, Turkey	Georgian–Ottoman wars	Kingdom of Imereti Kingdom of Kartli; Principality of Guria	Ottoman Empire	Defeat • Samtskhe becomes Ottoman vassal
1556	Battle of Garisi	Kvemo Kartli, Georgia (Georgia (country))	Georgian–Ottoman wars	Kingdom of Kartli	Safavid Empire	Pyrrhic victory (Note: Death of both Shahverdi Sultan and Luarsab I)
1561	Battle of Tsikhedidi	Mtskheta Municipality, Mtskheta-Mtianeti, Georgia (Georgia (country))	Georgian–Ottoman wars	Kingdom of Kartli; Kingdom of Kakheti	Safavid Empire	Defeat
1567	Battle of Digomi	Tbilisi, Georgia (Georgia (country))	Georgian–Ottoman wars	Kingdom of Kartli	Safavid Empire: (Safavid Iran) Daud Khan	Victory
1568	Battle of Samadlo	Tbilisi, Georgia (Georgia (country))	Georgian–Ottoman wars	Kingdom of Kartli	Safavid Empire: (Safavid Iran) Daud Khan	Victory
1569	Battle of Partskhisi	Tetritsqaro Municipality, Kvemo Kartli, Georgia (Georgia (country))	Georgian–Ottoman wars	Kingdom of Kartli	Safavid Empire: (Safavid Iran) Daud Khan; Avars Kumyks	Pyrrhic victory (Note: Simon I of Kartli defeats Safavids in a battle, but is captured and imprisoned, while Daud Khan assumes nominal control of Kartli)
1578	Battle of Çıldır	Çıldır, Ardahan Province, Turkey	Ottoman–Safavid War (1578–1590)	Safavid Empire Kingdom of Kartli	Ottoman Empire	Defeat
1579	Siege of Tbilisi	Tbilisi, Georgia (Georgia (country))	Ottoman–Safavid War (1578–1590)	Safavid Empire Kingdom of Kartli	Ottoman Empire	Defeat (Note: Georgian-Kizilbash army fails to recapture Tbilisi)
1582	Battle of Mukhrani	Mukhrani, Mtskheta-Mtianeti, Georgia (Georgia (country))	Georgian–Ottoman wars, Ottoman–Persian Wars	Kingdom of Kartli Kingdom of Kakheti; Safavid Empire	Ottoman Empire: Çıldır Eyalet; Erzurum Eyalet; Diyarbekir Eyalet	Victory (Note: Army of the Ottoman Empire fails to capture Kartli)
1584	Battle of Khatisopeli	Bolnisi Municipality, Kvemo Kartli, Georgia (Georgia (country))	Ottoman–Safavid War (1578–1590); Georgian-Ottoman wars	Kingdom of Kartli; Samtskhe-Saatabago	Ottoman Empire	Victory
1588	Battle of Gopanto	Tsqaltubo Municipality, Imereti, Georgia (Georgia (country))	War of Imeretian succession	Kingdom of Kartli	Kingdom of Imereti	Kartlian victory
1590	Battle of Opshkviti	Tsqaltubo Municipality, Imereti, Georgia (Georgia (country))	Civil war	Kingdom of Imereti; Principality of Mingrelia	Kingdom of Kartli	Imeretian and Mingrelian victory
1598–1599	Siege of Gori	Gori, Shida Kartli, Georgia (Georgia (country))	Georgian–Ottoman wars	Ottoman Empire	Kingdom of Kartli	Victory (Note: King Simon I of Kartli liberates city Gori from the Ottoman Empire)
1599	Battle of Nakhiduri	Tetritsqaro Municipality, Kvemo Kartli, Georgia (Georgia (country))	Georgian–Ottoman wars	Ottoman Empire	Kingdom of Kartli Principality of Guria Kingdom of Imereti	Defeat (Note: Simon who was taken captive, was brought to Istanbul and imprisoned in Yedikule.)
1609	Battle of Tashiskari	Khashuri Municipality, Shida Kartli, Georgia (Georgia (country))	Georgian–Ottoman wars	Kingdom of Kartli	Ottoman Empire Crimean Khanate	Victory
1615	Battle of Tsitsamuri	Mtskheta Municipality, Mtskheta-Mtianeti, Georgia (Georgia (country))	Abbas I's Kakhetian and Kartlian campaigns	Kingdom of Kakheti	Safavid Empire	Victory
1623	Battle of Gochouri	Kutaisi Municipality, Imereti, Georgia (Georgia (country))	Western Georgian civil war (1623–1658)	Principality of Mingrelia	Kingdom of Imereti	Mingrelian victory
1625	Battle of Aghaiani	Kaspi Municipality, Shida Kartli, Georgia (Georgia (country))	Kartli-Kakhetian Uprising (1625)	Kingdom of Kartli	Safavid Empire	Defeat
1625	Battle of Martqopi	Gardabani Municipality, Kvemo Kartli, Georgia (Georgia (country))	Kartli-Kakhetian Uprising (1625)	Kingdom of Kartli	Safavid Empire	Victory
1625	Battle of Marabda	Tetritsqaro Municipality, Kvemo Kartli, Georgia (Georgia (country))	Kartli-Kakhetian Uprising (1625)	Kingdom of Kartli	Safavid Empire	Defeat
1625	Battle of Ksani	Ksani Valley, Mtskheta-Mtianeti, Georgia (Georgia (country))	Kartli-Kakhetian Uprising (1625)	Kingdom of Kartli Kingdom of Kakheti	Safavid Empire	Victory
1626	Battle of Bazaleti	Bazaleti Lake, Dusheti Municipality, Mtskheta-Mtianeti, Georgia (Georgia (country))	Civil War	(Kingdom of Kakheti) Teimuraz I of Kakheti	Giorgi Saakadze	Victory of Teimuraz
1658	Battle of Bandza	Martvili Municipality, Mingrelia, Georgia (Georgia (country))	Western Georgian civil war (1623–1658)	Kingdom of Imereti Vameq III Dadiani	Liparit III Dadiani Principality of Guria; Childir Eyalet	Victory of Imereti (Note: Vameq is confirmed as Prince of Mingrelia and Imereti restores hegemony over western Georgia.)
1659	Battle of Bakhtrioni	Akhmeta Municipality, Kakheti, Georgia (Georgia (country))	Georgian–Safavid wars, Kakhetian Uprising (1659)	Kingdom of Kakheti	Safavid Empire	Victory (Note: 80,000 Turkoman and Persian killed by Georgians)
1684	Battle of Rokiti	Baghdati Municipality, Imereti, Georgia (Georgia (country))	Civil war	Kingdom of Imereti	Principality of Guria Duchy of Racha	Imeretian victory
1716	Battle of Simoneti	Terjola Municipality, Imereti, Georgia (Georgia (country))	Civil war	Kingdom of Imereti	Principality of Mingrelia Zurab Abashidze Childir Eyalet	Victory of Mingrelia and Abashidze (Note: George IV Gurieli is crowned as King of Imereti, but George VI of Imereti soon regains power)
1724	Battle of Zedavela	Gori Municipality, Shida Kartli, Georgia (Georgia (country))	Georgian–Ottoman wars	Kingdom of Kakheti	Ottoman Empire Jesse of Kartli	Defeat: Constantine II of Kakheti flees to the mountains, leaving Kakheti's throne vacant
1724	Battle of Ateni	Gori Municipality, Georgia (Georgia (country))	Georgian–Ottoman wars	Kingdom of Kakheti Kartlian rebels	Ottoman Empire	Defeat
1732	Battle of Chikhori	Terjola Municipality, Imereti, Georgia (Georgia (country))	Civil war	Kingdom of Imereti	Principality of Mingrelia Duchy of Racha	Imeretian victory
1739	Battle of Ananuri	Ananuri, Dusheti Municipality, Mtskheta-Mtianeti, Georgia (Georgia (country))	Civil war	Duchy of Ksani	Duchy of Aragvi	Victory of Ksani
1739	Battle of Karnal	Karnal, Haryana, India	Nader Shah's invasion of India	Afsharid Empire; Kingdom of Kakheti	Mughal Empire; Hyderabad; Oudh	Victory
1744	Battle of Achabeti	Temporary Kurta Municipality, Shida Kartli, Georgia (Georgia (country)) (de facto South Ossetia)	Kartli uprising	Kingdom of Kakheti: Teimuraz II; Heraclius II; Afsharid Empire	Givi Amilakhvari Ottoman Empire: Childir Eyalet; Lezgins	Victory of Heraclius and Teimuraz
1750	Battle of Danghis	Dagestan, Russian Federation (Russia)	Georgian–Lezgin wars	Kingdom of Kartli; Kingdom of Kakheti	Gazikumukh Khanate Lezgins	Victory
1751	Battle of Agri-Chai	Azerbaijan	Georgian–Lezgin wars	Kingdom of Kartli; Kingdom of Kakheti	Jar-Balakan; Elisu Sultanate; Shaki Khanate	Defeat
1751	Battle of Kirkhbulakh	Near Yerevan, Armenia	Azad Khan's invasion of Erivan Khanate	Kingdom of Kartli; Kingdom of Kakheti; Erivan Khanate	Azad Khan Afghan	Victory (Note: Erivan Khanate becomes vassal of the Kingdom of Kartli and Kakheti)
1752	Battle of Ganja	Ganja, Azerbaijan	Georgian–Lezgin wars	Kingdom of Kartli; Kingdom of Kakheti	Shaki Khanate	Defeat
1752	Battle of Tulkitepe	On the border of Qazax and Shamshadin Districts, Azerbaijan and Armenia	Georgian–Lezgin wars	Kingdom of Kartli; Kingdom of Kakheti	Shaki Khanate	Victory (Note: Erivan Khanate and Ganja Khanate again become vassals of the Kingdom of Kartli and Kakheti)
1754	Battle of Mchadijvari	Dusheti Municipality, Mtskheta-Mtianeti, Georgia (Georgia (country))	Georgian–Lezgin wars	Kingdom of Kartli; Kingdom of Kakheti	Avar Khanate; Shaki Khanate	Victory
1755	Battle of Kvareli	Kvareli, Kakheti, Georgia (Georgia (country))	Georgian–Lezgin wars	Kingdom of Kartli; Kingdom of Kakheti	Avar Khanate Gazikumukh Khanate; Shaki Khanate	Victory
1756	Battle of Skra	Kvemo Kartli, Georgia (Georgia (country))	Georgian–Lezgin wars	Kingdom of Kartli; Kingdom of Kakheti	Avar Khanate Lezgin mercenaries	Victory
1757	Battle of Khresili	Tkibuli Municipality, Imereti, Georgia (Georgia (country))	Georgian–Ottoman wars	Kingdom of Imereti; Principality of Mingrelia; Principality of Guria; Principality of Abkhazia (Samurzakano)	Ottoman Empire	Victory
1769	Siege of Shorapani	Shorapani, Zestaponi Municipality, Imereti, Georgia (Georgia (country))	Russo-Turkish War (1768–1774)	Kingdom of Imereti Russian Empire	Ottoman Empire	Defeat
1770	Siege of Atskuri	Atskuri Fortress, Samtskhe-Javakheti, Georgia (Georgia (country))	Russo-Turkish War (1768–1774)	Kingdom of Kartli-Kakheti Russian Empire	Ottoman Empire	Defeat
1770	Battle of Aspindza	Aspindza, Samtskhe-Javakheti, Georgia (Georgia (country))	Russo-Turkish War (1768–1774)	Kingdom of Kartli-Kakheti	Ottoman Empire Lezgin mercenaries	Victory
1770-1771	Siege of Poti	Poti, Mingrelia, Georgia (Georgia (country))	Russo-Turkish War (1768–1774)	Russian Empire Principality of Mingrelia	Ottoman Empire	Defeat: General Tottleben lifts the siege
1774	Battle of Chkheri	Kharagauli Municipality, Imereti, Georgia (Georgia (country))	Russo-Turkish War (1768–1774)	Kingdom of Imereti; Kingdom of Kartli-Kakheti	Ottoman Empire	Victory
1778	Battle of Ghartiskari	Mtskheta Municipality, Mtskheta-Mtianeti, Georgia (Georgia (country))	Georgian–Lezgin wars	Kingdom of Kartli-Kakheti	Lezgin marauders	Victory
1779	Battle of Rukhi	Zugdidi Municipality, Mingrelia, Georgia (Georgia (country))	Georgian–Ottoman wars	Kingdom of Imereti; Principality of Guria; Principality of Mingrelia	Ottoman Empire: Principality of Abkhazia; (Autonomous Republic of Crimea) Crimean Khanate; Circassians	Victory
1784	Battle of Nachiskrevi	Tsikhisdziri, Adjara, Georgia (Georgia (country))	Georgian–Ottoman wars	Kingdom of Imereti Principality of Guria	Ottoman Empire: Pasha of Poti	Defeat (Note: Lower Guria remains under Ottoman control)
1785	Battle of Mokhisi	Kareli Municipality, Shida Kartli, Georgia (Georgia (country))	Georgian–Ottoman wars Georgian–Lezgin wars	Kingdom of Kartli-Kakheti Russian Empire	Childir Eyalet Lezgin marauders	Victory
1789	Battle of Matkhoji	Khoni Municipality, Imereti, Georgia (Georgia (country))	War of Imeretian succession	David II of Imereti	Solomon II of Imereti Kingdom of Kartli-Kakheti; Principality of Mingrelia	Solomon II ascends to the Imeretian throne
1790	Battle of Zovreti	Near Zovreti, Zestaponi Municipality, Imereti, Georgia (Georgia (country))	War of Imeretian succession	David II of Imereti Ottoman Empire: Childir Eyalet; Lezgins	Solomon II of Imereti	David II ascends to the Imeretian throne
1795	Battle of Krtsanisi	Tbilisi, Georgia (Georgia (country))	Qajar invasion of Kartli-Kakheti	Kingdom of Kartli-Kakheti; Kingdom of Imereti	Qajar Iran: Ganja Khanate; Erivan Khanate; Armenians	Defeat • 13.000 Persians were killed by Georgians
1800	Battle of Niakhura	On the shores of Iori River, Kakheti, Georgia, (Georgia (country))	Georgian–Lezgin wars	Russian Empire Kingdom of Kartli-Kakheti	Avar Khanate Prince Alexander of Georgia	Victory

== Russian Empire ==
Date	Battle	Modern Location	Conflict	Combatant 1	Combatant 2	Result
1807	Siege of Akhalkalaki	Akhalkalaki, Samtskhe-Javakheti, Georgia (Georgia (country))	Russo-Turkish War (1806–1812)	Russian Empire	Ottoman Empire	Defeat (Note: Russian general Ivan Gudovich fails to capture Akhalkalaki and retreats while having lost a third of his forces.)
1809	Battle of Maltakva	Maltakva River, Mingrelia, Georgia (Georgia (country))	Russo-Turkish War (1806–1812)	Russian Empire; Principality of Guria; Principality of Mingrelia; Principality of Abkhazia	Ottoman Empire	Victory
1810	Siege of Sukhum	Sukhumi, Abkhazia, Georgia (Georgia (country))	Russo-Turkish War (1806–1812)	Russian Empire	Ottoman Empire Principality of Abkhazia	Russian victory (Note: Abkhazia joins Russian Empire as an autonomous principality)
1812	Battle of Chumlaki	Gurjaani Municipality, Kakheti, Georgia (Georgia (country))	Kakhetian uprising	Prince Grigol of Georgia	(Russia) Russian Empire	Defeat
1828-1829	Battle of Akhaltsikhe	Akhaltsikhe, Samtskhe-Javakheti, Georgia (Georgia (country))	Russo-Turkish War (1828–1829)	Russian Empire	Ottoman Empire	Victory
1829	Battle of Limani	Near Shekvetili, Ozurgeti Municipality, Guria, Georgia (Georgia (country))	Russo-Turkish War (1828–1829)	Russian Empire	Ottoman Empire	Victory
1841	Battle of Gogoreti	Ozurgeti Municipality, Guria, Georgia (Georgia (country))	Rebellion in Guria (1841)	Russian Empire	Gurian rebels	Victory
1853	Battle of Shekvetili	Shekvetili, Ozurgeti Municipality, Guria, Georgia (Georgia (country))	Crimean War	Russian Empire: Kutaisi Governorate	Ottoman Empire	Defeat
1853	Battle of Akhaltsikhe	Akhaltsikhe, Samtskhe-Javakheti, Georgia (Georgia (country))	Crimean War	Russian Empire: Kutaisi Governorate	Ottoman Empire	Victory
1854	Battle of Nigoiti	Lanchkhuti Municipality, Guria, Georgia (Georgia (country))	Crimean War	Russian Empire: Kutaisi Governorate	Ottoman Empire	Victory
1854	Battle of Choloki	Kakuti, Ozurgeti Municipality, Guria, Georgia (Georgia (country))	Crimean War	Russian Empire: Kutaisi Governorate	Ottoman Empire	Victory
1855	Battle of Enguri	On the shores of Enguri River, border between Mingrelia and Abkhazia, Georgia (Georgia (country))	Crimean War	Russian Empire: Kutaisi Governorate	Ottoman Empire	Defeat
1877-1878	Batumi operation	Adjara, Georgia (Georgia (country))	Russo-Turkish War (1877–1878)	Russian Empire	Ottoman Empire	Victory
1905	Battle of Nasakirali	Nasakirali, Ozurgeti Municipality, Guria, Georgia (Georgia (country))	Russian Revolution of 1905	Gurian Republic	Russian Empire: Cossacks	Victory

== Georgian Democratic Republic (1918–1921) ==
Date	Battle	Modern Location	Conflict	Combatant 1	Combatant 2	Result
1918	Battle of Batum: Battle of Anaria Fort	Adjara, Georgia (Georgia (country))	Caucasus campaign	(Transcaucasian Democratic Federative Republic) Transcaucasian Commissariat	Ottoman Empire	Defeat
1918	Battle of Choloki	Choloki River, Adjara, Georgia (Georgia (country))	Caucasus campaign	(Transcaucasian Democratic Federative Republic) Transcaucasian Commissariat	Ottoman Empire	Victory
1918	Battle of Mokvi	Ochamchire Municipality, Abkhazia, Georgia (Georgia (country))	Abkhazia conflict (1918)	(Georgia (country)) Democratic Republic of Georgia	Ottoman Empire: Abkhaz Muhacir landing force	Victory
1919	Battle of Gagra	Gagra Municipality, Abkhazia, Georgia (Georgia (country))	Sochi conflict	(Georgia (country)) Democratic Republic of Georgia Military support: Green armies	(Russia) White movement	Victory: Georgians recapture Gagra
1921	Battle of Tbilisi	Tbilisi, Georgia (Georgia (country))	Red Army invasion of Georgia	(Georgia (country)) Democratic Republic of Georgia	Russian SFSR	Defeat
1921	Battle of Osiauri	Khashuri Municipality, Shida Kartli, Georgia (Georgia (country))	Red Army invasion of Georgia	(Georgia (country)) Democratic Republic of Georgia	Russian SFSR Georgian SSR	Defeat
1921	Battle of Surami	Khashuri Municipality, Shida Kartli, Georgia (Georgia (country))	Red Army invasion of Georgia	(Georgia (country)) Democratic Republic of Georgia	Russian SFSR Georgian SSR	Defeat
1921	Battle of Batumi	Adjara, Georgia (Georgia (country))	Red Army invasion of Georgia	(Georgia (country)) Democratic Republic of Georgia Supported by: Georgian SSR	Turkish Provisional Government	Victory

== Soviet Union (1922–1991) ==
Date	Battle	Modern Location	Conflict	Combatant 1	Combatant 2	Result
1941-1944	Siege of Leningrad	Saint Petersburg, Russia	Eastern Front of World War II	Germany; Finland; Naval support: Italy	Soviet Union: 224th Georgian Division	Victory
1941-1942	Battle of the Kerch Peninsula	Crimea, Ukraine	Eastern Front of World War II: Crimean campaign	Germany; Romania	Soviet Union: 224th Georgian Division; 414th Georgian Division	Defeat
1942-1943	Battle of the Caucasus	Northern Caucasus (Russia)	Eastern Front of World War II: Case Blue	(Nazi Germany) Germany (Kingdom of Romania) Romania (Slovak Republic (1939–1945)) Slovakia	Soviet Union: 276th Georgian Division; 242nd Georgian Division; 392nd Georgian Division; 394th Georgian Division; 406th Georgia Division; 414th Georgian Division	Victory
1943	Battle of the Dnieper	Dnieper River, Ukraine and Russia	Eastern Front of World War II	(Nazi Germany) Germany (Kingdom of Romania) Romania	Soviet Union: 394th Georgian Division	Victory
1943	Kerch–Eltigen operation	Crimea, Ukraine	Eastern Front of World War II	(Nazi Germany) Germany (Kingdom of Romania) Romania	Soviet Union: 414th Georgian Division	Inconclusive
1944	Nikopol–Krivoi Rog offensive	Nikopol and Krivoi Rog area, Dnipropetrovsk Oblast, Ukraine	Eastern Front of World War II: Dnieper–Carpathian offensive	(Nazi Germany) Germany	Soviet Union: 394th Georgian Division	Victory
1944	Battle of Crimea	Crimea, Ukraine	Eastern Front of World War II	(Nazi Germany) Germany (Kingdom of Romania) Romania	Soviet Union: 414th Georgian Division	Victory
1944	First Jassy–Kishinev offensive	Eastern Romania	Eastern Front of World War II	(Kingdom of Romania) Romania (Nazi Germany) Germany	Soviet Union: 394th Georgian Division	Defeat
1944	Battle of Vyborg Bay	Vyborg Bay (Finland)	Continuation War	Finland (Nazi Germany) Germany	Soviet Union: 224th Georgian Division	Inconclusive
1944	Second Jassy–Kishinev offensive	Eastern and Southern Romania	Eastern Front of World War II	(Kingdom of Romania) Romania (until 24 August 1944) (Nazi Germany) Germany	Soviet Union: 394th Georgian Division; (Kingdom of Romania) Romania (since 24 August 1944) (Democratic Federal Yugoslavia) Democratic Federal Yugoslavia; Air support: United States	Victory

== Republic of Georgia (1991–) ==
Date	Battle	Modern Location	Conflict	Combatant 1	Combatant 2	Result
1992	Battle of Sokhumi	Sukhumi, Abkhazia, Georgia (Georgia (country))	War in Abkhazia (1992-1993)	Georgia	Abkhazia • Bagramyan Battalion	Victory
1992	Landing at Gagra	Gagra Municipality, Abkhazia, Georgia (Georgia (country))	War in Abkhazia (1992-1993)	Georgia	Abkhazia • Bagramyan Battalion	Victory
1992-1993	Siege of Tkvarcheli	Tkvarcheli, Abkhazia, Georgia (Georgia (country))	War in Abkhazia (1992-1993)	Georgia	Abkhazia; Confederation of Mountain Peoples of the Caucasus; Bagramyan Battalion; Russia	Defeat
1992	Battle of Gagra	Gagra Municipality, Abkhazia, Georgia (Georgia (country))	War in Abkhazia (1992-1993)	Georgia	Abkhazia; Confederation of Mountain Peoples of the Caucasus; Bagramyan Battalion; Russia	Defeat: Abkhaz separatists capture Gagra District
1993	January Offensive	Gumista River, Abkhazia, Georgia (Georgia (country))	War in Abkhazia (1992-1993)	Georgia	Abkhazia; Confederation of Mountain Peoples of the Caucasus	Victory: Abkhaz separatists fail to capture Sokhumi
1993	Battle of Gumista	Gumista River, Abkhazia, Georgia (Georgia (country))	War in Abkhazia (1992-1993)	Georgia	Abkhazia; Confederation of Mountain Peoples of the Caucasus; Bagramyan Battalion; Russia	Victory: Abkhaz separatists fail to capture Sokhumi
1993	July Offensive	Sukhumi and Ochamchire Municipality, Abkhazia, Georgia (Georgia (country))	War in Abkhazia (1992-1993)	Georgia	Abkhazia; Confederation of Mountain Peoples of the Caucasus; Bagramyan Battalion; Russia	Inconclusive: Abkhaz separatists capture strategic heights north of Sokhumi but fail to capture the city
1993	Battle of Kamani	Sukhumi Municipality, Abkhazia, Georgia (Georgia (country))	War in Abkhazia (1992-1993)	Georgia	Abkhazia; Confederation of Mountain Peoples of the Caucasus; Bagramyan Battalion; Russia	Defeat
1993	Tamishi landing	Sukhumi Municipality, Abkhazia, Georgia (Georgia (country))	War in Abkhazia (1992-1993)	Georgia	Abkhazia; Confederation of Mountain Peoples of the Caucasus; Bagramyan Battalion; Russia	See aftermath
1993	Fall of Sokhumi	Sokhumi, Abkhazia, Georgia (Georgia (country))	War in Abkhazia (1992-1993)	Georgia	Abkhazia; Confederation of Mountain Peoples of the Caucasus; Bagramyan Battalion; Russia	Defeat
1993	Battle of Poti	Poti, Mingrelia, Georgia (Georgia (country))	Georgian Civil War	(Georgia (country)) Eduard Shevardnadze government Russia	(Georgia (country)) Zviadists	Victory of the Shevardnadze government and Russia
1993	Battle of Samtredia	Samtredia, Imereti, Georgia (Georgia (country))	Georgian Civil War	(Georgia (country)) Eduard Shevardnadze government Russia	(Georgia (country)) Zviadists	Victory of the Shevardnadze government and Russia
2006–2014	Battle of Nawzad	Nawzad, Helmand province, Afghanistan	War in Afghanistan (2001–2021)	International Security Assistance Force: United States; United Kingdom; Estonia; Georgia	(Afghanistan) Taliban	Indecisive
2008	Operation Phantom Phoenix	North-central Iraq	Iraq War	United States; Iraq (Georgia (country)) Georgia; United Kingdom	Islamic state of Iraq; Other Iraqi Insurgents	Partial victory
2008	Battle of Tskhinvali	Tskhinvali, Shida Kartli, Georgia (Georgia (country)) (de facto South Ossetia)	Russo-Georgian War	Georgia	South Ossetia; Russia	Defeat
2008	Battle in the Liakhvi Gorge	Georgia (Georgia (country)) (de facto South Ossetia)	Russo-Georgian War	Georgia	South Ossetia; Russia	Defeat
2008	Battle of the Kodori Valley	Upper Abkhazia, Georgia (Georgia (country))	Russo-Georgian War	Georgia	Abkhazia; Russia	Defeat
2008	Bombing of Tbilisi	Tbilisi, Georgia (Georgia (country))	Russo-Georgian War	Georgia	Russia	Defeat
2008	Battle off the coast of Abkhazia	Black Sea off Abkhazia, in the vicinity of Ochamchire, Georgia (Georgia (country))	Russo-Georgian War	Georgia	Abkhazia; Russia	Defeat
2008	Battle of Shindisi	Shindisi, Gori Municipality, Georgia (Georgia (country))	Russo-Georgian War	Georgia	South Ossetia; Russia	Defeat
2008	Occupation of Poti	Poti, Mingrelia, Georgia (Georgia (country))	Russo-Georgian War	Georgia	Russia	Defeat
2008	Occupation of Gori	Gori, Shida Kartli, Georgia (Georgia (country))	Russo-Georgian War	Georgia	Russia	Defeat
2010–2011	Battle of Sangin	Sangin District, Helmand Province, Afghanistan	War in Afghanistan (2001–2021)	ISAF / NATO: United States; Islamic Republic of Afghanistan; (Georgia (country)) Georgia	(Afghanistan) Taliban	Victory

== See also ==
- List of wars involving Georgia (country)

== Bibliography ==
- Appian. The Mithridatic Wars.
- Bagrationi, Vakhushti (1976). Nakashidze, N.T. (ed.). История Царства Грузинского [History of the Kingdom of Georgia] (PDF) (in Russian). Tbilisi: Metsniereba. pp. 133–135.
- Bournoutian, George A. (1997). "Eastern Armenia from the Seventeenth Century to the Russian Annexation". In Hovannisian, Richard (ed.). The Armenian People From Ancient to Modern Times, Volume II: Foreign Dominion to Statehood: The Fifteenth Century to the Twentieth Century. Macmillan. pp. 81–107. ISBN 0-333-61974-9.
- Javakhishvili, Ivane (1949). ქართველი ერის ისტორია, ტომი III [History of the Georgian nation, volume III] (in Georgian). Tbilisi: Metsniereba.
- Javakhishvili, Ivane. ქართველი ერის ისტორია, წიგნი IV [History of the Georgian nation, book IV] (PDF) (in Georgian). pp. 30–32.
- Kaegi, Walter Emil (2003). Heraclius, Emperor of Byzantium. Cambridge, United Kingdom: Cambridge University Press. ISBN 0-521-81459-6.
- Petersen, Leif Inge Ree (2013). Siege Warfare and Military Organization in the Successor States (400-800 AD): Byzantium, the West and Islam. BRILL. ISBN 978-9004254466.
- Rayfield, Donald (2013). Edge of Empires: A History of Georgia. Reaktion Books. ISBN 978-1780230702.
- Minorsky, Vladimir (1953). Studies in Caucasian History. Cambridge University Press. ISBN 9780521057356.
- Brosset, Marie-Félicité (1849). Histoire de la Géorgie depuis l'Antiquité jusqu'au XIXe siècle. Volume I [History of Georgia from Ancient Times to the 19th Century, Volume 1] (in French). Saint-Petersburg: Imperial Academy of Sciences.
- Rayfield, Donald (2012). Edge of Empires, a History of Georgia. London: Reaktion Books. ISBN 9781780230306.
- Mikaberidze, Alexander (2015). Historical Dictionary of Georgia. Rowman & Littlefield Publishers. ISBN 9781442241466.
- Asatiani, Nodar; Janelidze, Otar (2009). History of Georgia: From Ancient Times to the Present Day. Publishing House Petite. ISBN 9789941906367.
- Fähnrich, Heinz (2010). Geschichte Georgiens (in German). Brill Publishers. ISBN 978-9004184503.
- Allen, William (2023). A History of the Georgian People: From the Beginning Down to the Russian Conquest in the Nineteenth Century. Taylor & Francis. ISBN 9781000855302.
- Georgian Soviet Encyclopedia
- Rakhmanalieva (1992). Тамерлан. Эпоха. Личность. Деяния. Москва: Гураш.
- Thomson, Robert W. (1996). Rewriting Caucasian History. Oxford University Press. ISBN 0-19-826373-2.
- Silogava, Valeri; Shengelia, Kakha (2007). History of Georgia: From the Ancient Times Through the "Rose Revolution". Caucasus University Publishing House. ISBN 9789994086160.
- Narimanishvili, Goderdzi; Shanshashvili, Nino (2018). Trialeti: Cultural and Historical Heritage, Ancient Sources and Prospects of Research. Georgian National Museum. ISBN 9789941279652.
- Frye, R. N. (1975). The Cambridge History of Iran. Vol. 4. Cambridge University Press. ISBN 978-0-521-20093-6.
- Baumer, Christoph (2021). History of the Caucasus. Volume one, At the crossroads of empires. London: I.B. Tauris. ISBN 978-1-78831-007-9. OCLC 1259549144.
- Peacock, Andrew (2006). "Georgia and the Anatolian Turks in the 12th and 13th centuries". Anatolian Studies. 56: 127–146. doi:10.1017/S0066154600000806. ISSN 0066-1546. JSTOR 20065551. S2CID 155798755.
