= Siege of Tabriz =

Siege of Tabriz or capture of Tabriz may refer to:

- Capture of Tabriz (1210)
- Siege of Tabriz (1501)
- Battle of Tabriz (1514)
- Capture of Tabriz (1585)
- Siege of Tabriz (1585–1586)
- Safavid capture of Tabriz (1603)
- Expedition to Tabriz (1610)
- Battle of Tabriz (1618)
- Capture of Tabriz (1635)
- Siege of Tabriz (1725)
- Siege of Tabriz (1908–1909)
- Russian occupation of Tabriz (1909–1918)
- Tabriz during World War I, briefly captured by the Ottomans in 1915
