= Siege of Ganja =

Siege of Ganja may refer to:

- Siege of Ganja (1213), successful siege of the city of Ganja, by the Georgians under King George IV
- Siege of Ganja (1606), successful siege of the city of Ganja, by the Safavids
- Siege of Ganja (1734–1735), successful siege of the city of Ganja, by the Safavids
