= George IV of Georgia =

King of Georgia from 1213 to 1223

George IV გიორგი IV
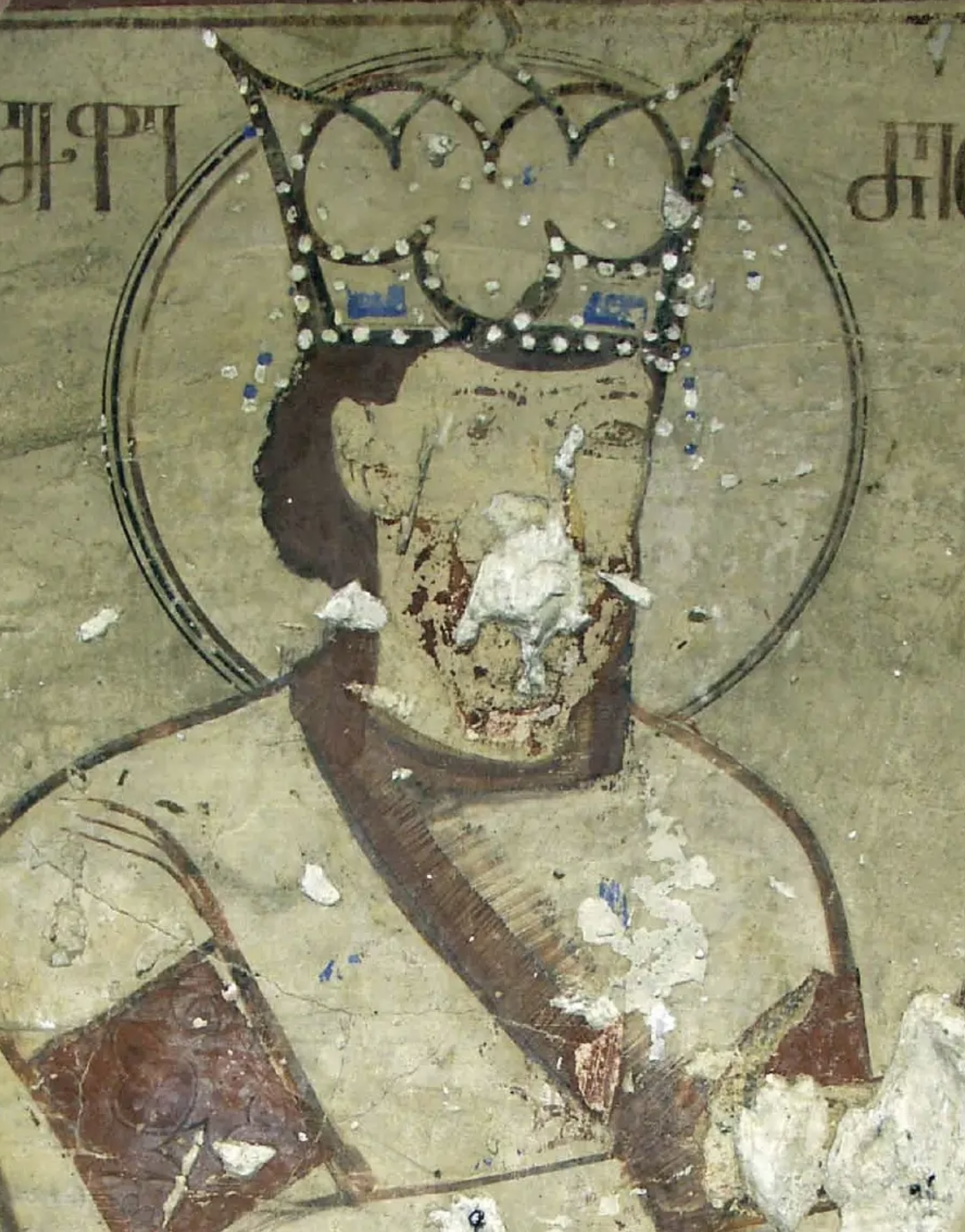
- Fresco of George IV from the Bertubani Monastery.

King of Georgia
- Reign: 1213–1223
- Coronation: 1207 as co-king
- Predecessor: Tamar
- Successor: Rusudan
- Born: 1192; Tabakhmela
- Died: 18 January 1223 (aged 30–31); Bagavan
- Burial: Gelati Monastery
- Issue: David VII (ill.)
Names
- George IV Lasha
- Dynasty: Bagrationi
- Father: David Soslan
- Mother: Tamar of Georgia
- Religion: Georgian Orthodox Church
- Khelrtva

George IV (Georgian: გიორგი IV, romanized: giorgi IV; 1192 – 18 January 1223), also known as Lasha Giorgi (Georgian: ლაშა გიორგი), of the Bagrationi dynasty, was the king (mepe) of the Kingdom of Georgia from 1213 to 1223.

== Early life ==
George was the son of Queen Tamar of Georgia and her consort David Soslan, George was declared as a coregent by his mother in 1207. According to the Georgian chronicles, the prince's second name Lasha meant 'illuminator of the world' in the Abkhaz language (a-lasha meant light).

He had a princely domain in Javakheti, centered around Alastani, for which he was known by the title of javakht' up'ali, i.e., "the Lord of the Javakhians" as suggested by a type of silver coins struck in his name.

== Reign ==
Charter of King George IV.

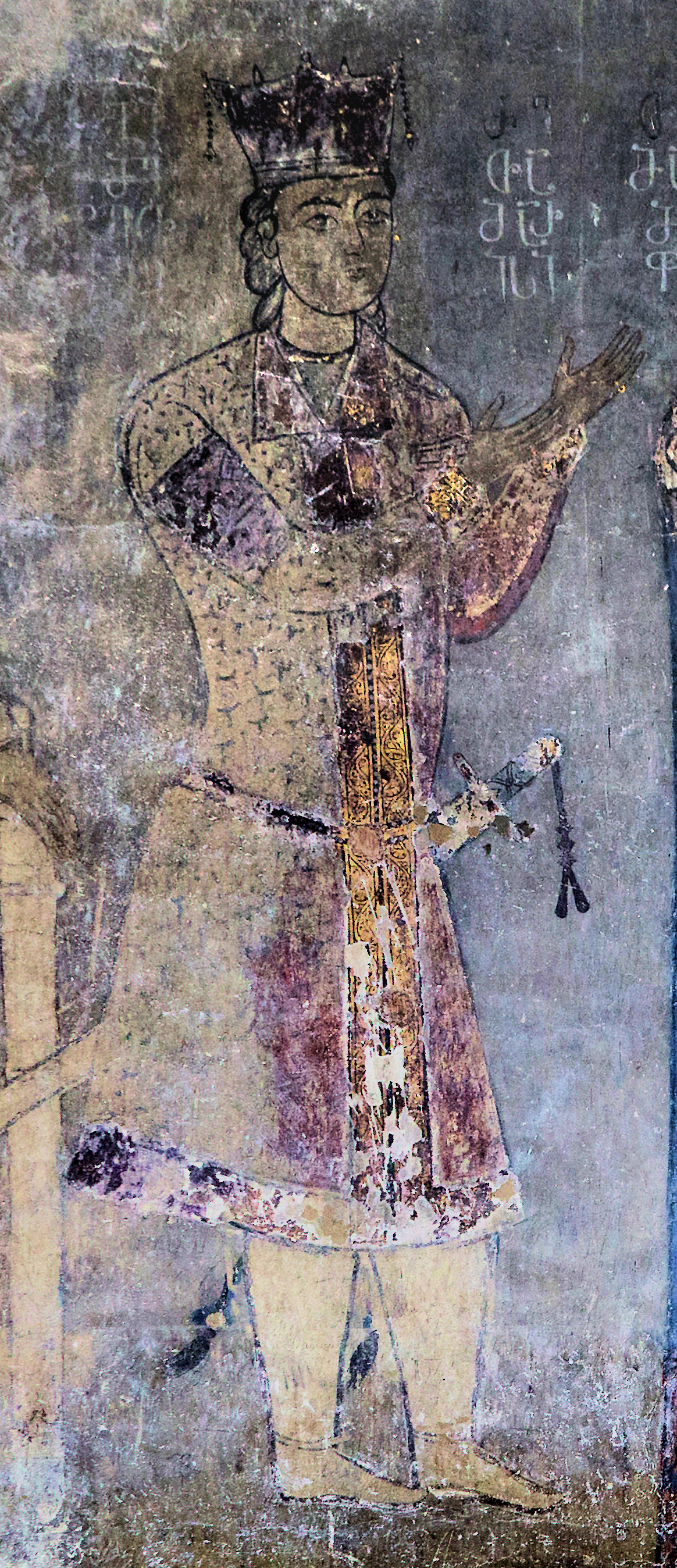
Fresco of George IV from the Betania Monastery

After Tamar's death, George IV became the ruler of Kingdom of Georgia, George continued Tamar's policy of strengthening the feudal Georgian state.

The feudal lords supporting George were Sargis Tmogveli, Shalva and Ivane Akhaltsikheli, Sula Surameli, Botso and Memna Jaqeli. Lasha's opponents were Ivane I Mkhargrdzeli and Varam Gageli.

At Tamar's death, the atabeg of Ganja, Muzaffar al-Din Uzbek, stopped paying tribute. King George called Darbazi – the supreme royal council – where he proposed punishing the atabeg of Ganja immediately. The nobles approved a campaign and George IV set out to ravage Ganja with an ample army. The Georgian army under Ivane Mkhargrdzeli immediately sent troops to Ganja and enforced Georgian suzerainty by besieging, instead of storming the city. George lost patience with his generals’ decision, detached 4,000 men from the siege force and encircled Ganja. The Ganja garrison realized George’s vulnerability: 10,000 well-armed men left the citadel and attacked. The ensuing fighting, although won by the Georgians, caused heavy casualties, but the atabeg of Ganja agreed to pay tribute again.

The economy of Georgia's vassal states suffered from inflation in the 1210s. The nineteen lines inscribed on the stone block of the ruined church of Ani record the head of the Georgian Church, Catholicos Epiphanes, a dyophysite layman. The fees for baptism, marriage and burial increased threefold and reached 100 Tbilisi's drams. Priests also demanded a banquet or a whole cow for their service. The clergy refused to accept less, which made the laity boycott the church. Epiphanes ordered the tithe to be reduced by two-thirds: any extra should be within the layman's means. If this inflation was general, it explains the reluctance of Armenian cities to pay taxes to Tbilisi. Unlike in the east, where the Khwarazmians blocked Georgia's advances, in the south the Georgian army could enforce its will.

In 1219, George campaigned against Erzurum, Nakhchivan and Ahlat and forced them to pay annual tribute. The king once again confirmed the Georgian dominance in Anatolia and Iran.

Innocent III had managed to secure the participation of the Kingdom of Georgia in the Fifth Crusade. In the late 1210s, according to the Georgian chronicles, George began making preparations for a campaign in the Holy Land to support the Franks.

The first Mongol expedition defeated two Georgian armies in 1221–1222 and left through the Inner Caucasus. Georgians suffered heavy losses in this war, and the King himself was severely wounded, His plans for the Fifth Crusade were cut off by the Mongol invasion.

King George IV went to Bagavan, Armenia, to secure his sister's marriage to the Shah of Shirvan and ensure her succession. At the age of 31, he died prematurely in Bagavan, due to complications from the wound he had suffered when fighting the Mongols . He was succeeded by his sister Rusudan. George was buried at Gelati monastery.

== Personal life ==
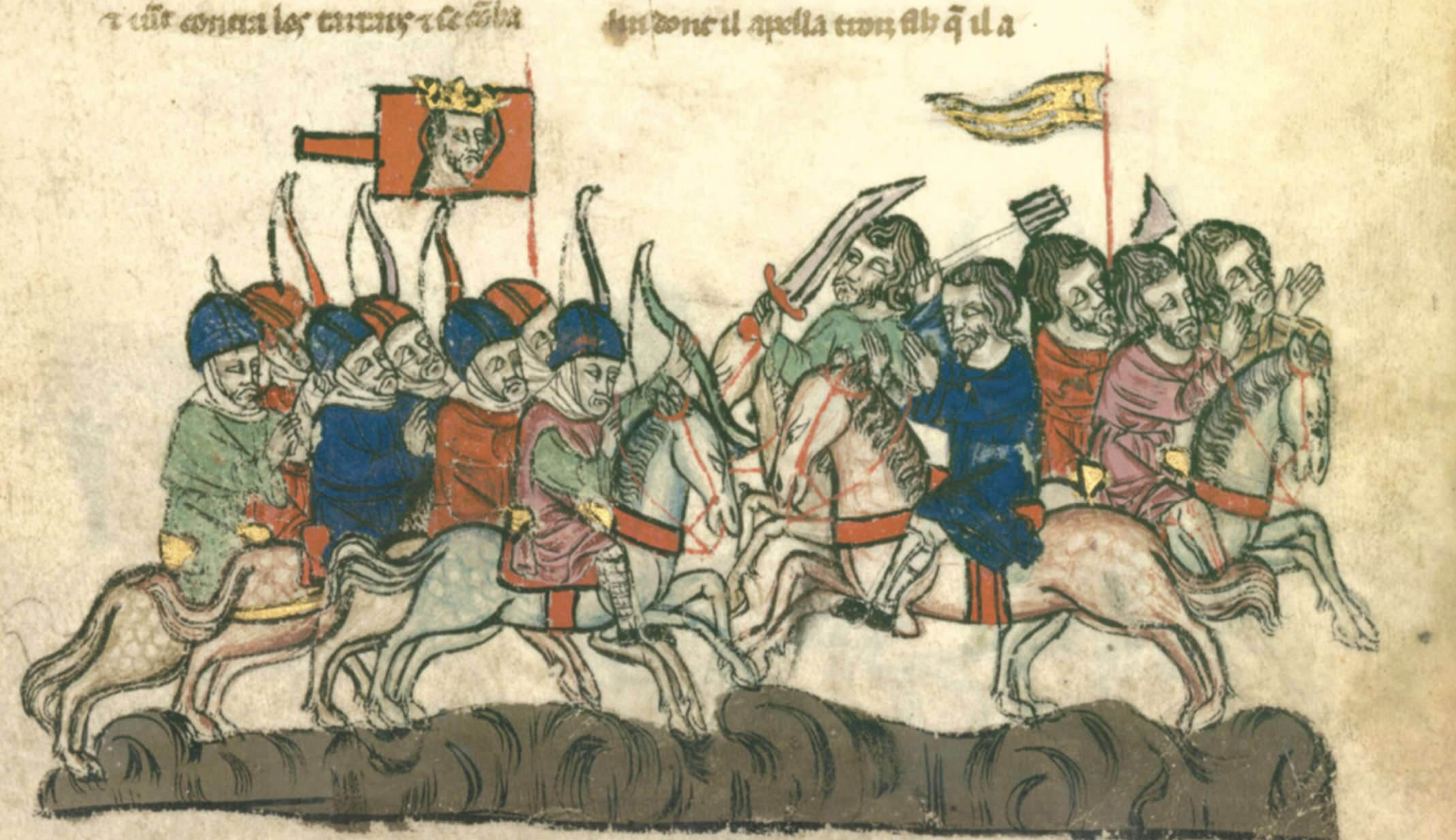
A miniature depicting an attack of the Georgian king George IV Lasha on Mongols in 1220. La Flor des estoires de la terre d'Orient by Hayton of Corycus. King George is shown in blue garment on a white horse holding a whip.

While George IV was in Kakheti, he saw a young woman from Velistsikhe, the daughter of a freeman. Despite her being married, he seduced her and brought her to the royal court. In 1215, she had a son, David VII (1215–1270), King of Georgia (1246–1270), whom George gave to his sister Rusudan to raise.

This caused unrest within the Georgian Orthodox Church. A delegation of bishops, along with the Catholicos and ministers, confronted the king about the scandal. Since the woman was a commoner and another man's wife, George IV was forced to send her back to her husband with nuns as escorts. However, George insisted that she was his wife and refused any other marriage arranged by the court, refusing to legitimize any heir.

== See also ==
- Kazreti monastery

== Bibliography ==
- Baumer, Christoph (2023). History of the Caucasus. Bloomsbury Publishing. ISBN 9780755636303.
- Rayfield, Donald (2012). Edge of Empires, a History of Georgia. London: Reaktion Books. ISBN 978-1-78023-070-2.
- Mikaberidge, Alexander (2006). Georgia. The Crusades – An Encyclopedia. pp. 511–513.
- Cahen, Claude (1969). Mongols and the Near East (PDF). A History of the Crusades (Setton), Volume II. Archived from the original (PDF) on 2024-03-13.
- Mikaberidze, Alexander (2015). Historical Dictionary of Georgia. Rowman & Littlefield Publishers. ISBN 9781442241466.

Preceded by Tamar	King of Georgia; 1213–1223	Succeeded by Rusudan
