= Siege of Tbilisi =

Siege of Tbilisi may refer to:

- Siege of Tbilisi (627–628), successful siege of the city by the Byzantines and Turks
- Siege of Tbilisi (1122), successful siege of the city of Tbilisi, capital of the Emirate of Tbilisi, by the Georgians under King David IV
- Siege of Tbilisi (1386), successful Timurid attack on the capital of Kingdom of Georgia
- Siege of Tbilisi (1476), part of Turkoman invasions of Georgia
- Siege of Tbilisi (1795), in 1795, part of Persian invasion of Kingdom of Kartli-Kakheti
- Siege of Tbilisi (1921), see List of Georgian battles
