= Kazreti Monastery =

- Location within Kvemo Kartli Location within Georgia

Religion
- Affiliation: Georgian Orthodox Church
- Year consecrated: 13th century

Location
- Location: (Georgia (country)) Kutaisi, Georgia
- Interactive map of Kazreti Monastery
- Coordinates: 41°22′39″N 44°24′47″E

Architecture
- Type: Monastery, church, castle
- Style: Georgian

The Kazreti Monastery (Georgian: კაზრეთის მონასტერი) is a Georgian monastic complex located in the Kvemo Kartli region, Bolnisi district, near the city of Kazreti, Georgia. Monastery also known as Kazreti Trinity Monastery was built by King George IV known as Lasha Giorgi in the 13th century.

== History ==
In 1956, the Kazreti complex was cleaned and restored by the Ministry of Protection of Cultural Monuments and Restoration of the Ministry of Culture of Georgia, previously, the church was covered with a depth of one meter. Currently, the Trinity Church of Kazreti is restored and painted inside and is under the supervision of the Diocese of Bolnisi, still active for worship. In 2006, the church received a category of Immovable Cultural Monuments of National Significance of Georgia.

== Description ==
The Trinity church of Kazreti has an elongated rectangle-shaped floor plan that has been built from the northeast to the southwest. The facades show a luxurious decoration that creates a wooden frame, carving, a cross, etc. The church ends in the eastern half with a deep apse. There are two entrances in the north and west with portals. The main entrance is that of the north.

The second feature of the architectural plan was resolved again in the eastern part, in the adjacent wall, instead of two side posts, there is only one on the north side. In the south there is a false vault in the wall of the apse. The interior of the building did not arrive in its original form. The western wall is fortified with additional walls. The cathedral was painted in fresco, the remains of the Church Fathers and the figures of the Apostles on the altar are still appreciated. There is also a cycle with individual saints.

== Literature ==
• Vakhtang Dolidze, two architectural monuments of Kazreti Gorge, "Friend of the Monument, No. 20, pp. 4–18, 1970.
