= Battle of Bolnisi =

Military conflict in Kingdom of Georgia (1228 AD)

- Part of Jalal al-Din's invasions of Georgia
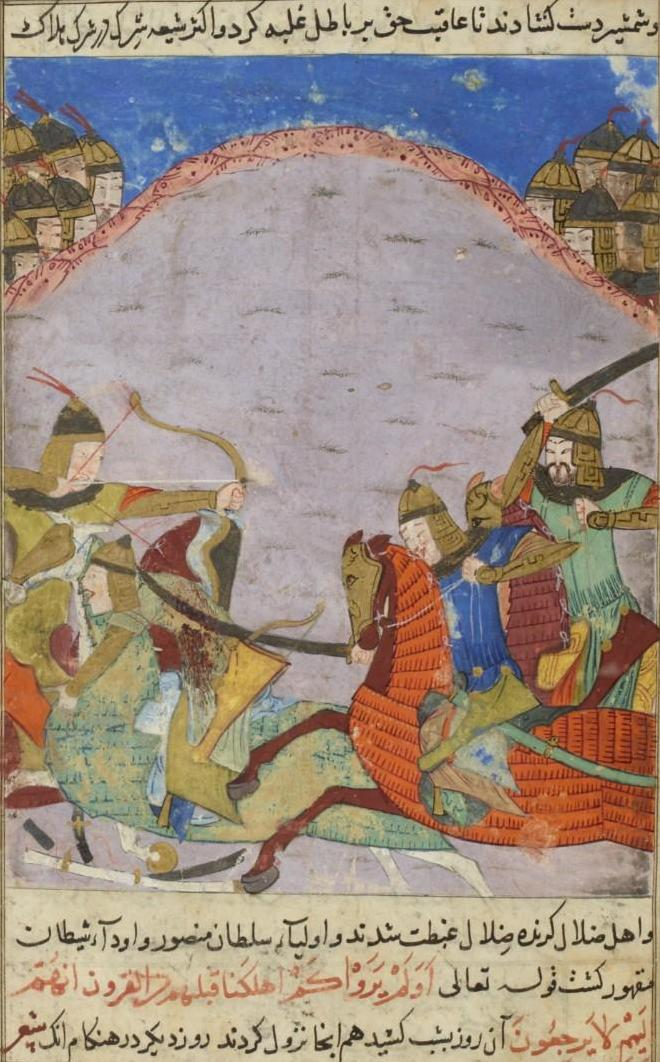
- The Georgians (left) against the Khwarezmians (right) in the battle of Bolnisi in 1227. From the Tarikh-i Jahangushay manuscript created in Shiraz, Iran, in 1438.
Date	1228
Location	Bolnisi, Kingdom of Georgia 41°27′N 44°32′E
Result	Khwarazmian victory

Belligerents
Khwarazmian Empire	Kingdom of Georgia

Commanders and leaders
Jalal al-Din Mangburni	(Kingdom of Georgia) Avag Zakarian

Strength
Unknown	Unknown

Casualties and losses
Unknown	Unknown

The Battle of Bolnisi (Georgian: ბოლნისის ბრძოლა) was fought in 1228 AD near Bolnisi, then part of the Kingdom of Georgia. The invading Khwarazmid Empire was led by Jalal al-Din Mangburni, its last Sultan, who was driven from his realm by the Mongol Empire and was trying to recapture lost territories.

== Background ==
Jalal ad-Din's first encounter with the Kingdom of Georgia occurred in 1225, when his army inflicted a crushing defeat on the Georgians at Garni, bringing about the end of Georgia's medieval heyday. Next year, Jalal ad-Din marched on to Tbilisi, forcing Queen Rusudan of Georgia and her court into flight. The Georgian forces, left in defense of the capital, put up a fierce resistance, but Jalal's forces eventually broke into the city with the assistance of local Muslims on 9 March 1226. The victorious Khwarazmian soldiers sacked Tbilisi and massacred its Christian population.

When Jalal failed to capture Ahlat, the Georgians briefly recaptured Tbilisi, but on Jalal's return in 1227, the small garrison chose to put the city to the torch themselves. Although the queen Rusudan remained in Kutaisi.

== Battle ==
Avag did not give up and assembled an army composed of Georgians, Kipchaks, Alans and Vainakhs. In 1228 he attacked the Khwarazmians at Bolnisi where Jalal ad-Din's forces were waiting. Jalal ad-Din's army included Kipchak banners, consisting of 20,000 men in the Georgian ranks and appealed to them, 'lending a certain Qoshqar to them with a loaf of bread and salt to remind them of their 'former obligations' to his house. The Kipchaks withdrew support from the Georgians. The battle ended with a Khwarezmid victory and is marked as a disastrous event in Georgian history due to betrayal.

== Sources ==
- Guchava V., Georgian Soviet Encyclopedia, II, p. 452–453, Tbilisi, 1977
- Baumer, Christoph (2023). History of the Caucasus. Bloomsbury Publishing. ISBN 9780755636303.
