= Misimians =

Mountainous tribe in the western Caucasus

Regions with significant populations
- Northwestern part of the Caucasian Ridge

Misimians (Greek: Μισιμιανοί) were a tribe in the western Caucasus living in the mountainous side of South Caucasus, north of Sokhumi.

== History ==
During the time of the Roman-Persian wars, the Misimians rebelled because of the attempts of Byzantium to give the territory of Bukhlon to the Alans. The uprising was brutally suppressed, and the territory of Bukhlon was given to the Alans.

== Origins ==
Agathias wrote that the Misimians were "subjects of the king of the Colchians as are also the Apsilians though they differ from these in both language and customs" and that the Misimians and Apsilians had a similar way of life.

The ethnic origin of Misimians is a matter of controversy. Georgian scholars generally consider the Misimians to be a Kartvelian tribe, identifying them with Ptolemy's Svano-Colchs and with Faustus' Egro-Svans. According to these scholars the self-identification of Svan Mushuan was changed into Misimian in Greek language. According to Gasviani, the Svan presence in the region is also supported by the fact that many of the toponyms are of Svan origin. Abkhaz scholars treat the Misimians as a population related to the Abkhaz.
