= Battle of Sukhumi (1992) =

First battle of the War in Abkhazia (1992–1993)

- Part of the War in Abkhazia (1992–1993)
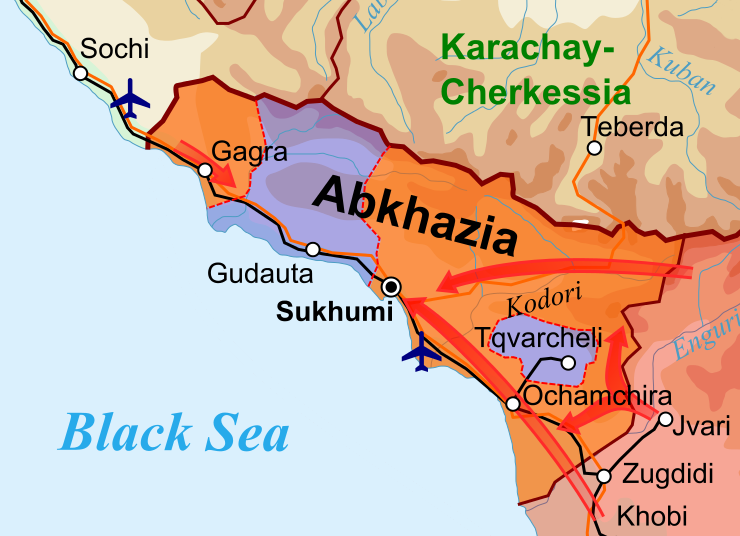
- Abkhazia c. 1992
Date	14 August 12:00 – 18 August 1992
Location	Sukhumi, Abkhazia, Georgia
Result	Georgian victory: Abkhazian separatists retreated to Gudauta

Belligerents
Georgia	Abkhazia

Commanders and leaders
(Georgia (country)) Tengiz Kitovani	(Abkhazia) Sergei Dbar

Units involved
Georgian National Guard	Abkhaz National Guard; Abkhaz MVD troops

Strength
1,000-3,000	Unknown

Casualties and losses
- At least 50 killed

The Battle of Sukhumi or the Battle of Sokhumi took place on August 14, 1992 12:00, between Abkhazian separatists and Georgian National Guard. The battle marked the start of 1992–1993 War in Abkhazia.

== Background ==
On 23 July 1992, the Abkhaz faction of Abkhazia's legislative body, Supreme Council, announced its sovereignty from Georgia. However, this decision was taken without necessary quorum as the Georgian faction of the Supreme Council had boycotted the session. To respond to this situation, Eduard Shevardnadze, new leader of Georgia, had interrupted his trip to Western Georgia, where the Civil War had been going on between his government and supporters of former President, Zviad Gamsakhurdia, ousted during the December 1991 Coup. Shevardnadze announced that the Abkhaz decision had been taken without consulting and considering the opinion of the majority of Abkhasian population. According to 1989 census, 45.7% of Abkhazia's population was Georgian, 17.8% Abkhazian, while the rest were other ethnicities.

== Battle ==
On 11 August 1992, in a hit-and-run campaign, armed supporters of former Georgian president kidnapped Georgian Interior Minister, Roman Gventsadze, and five other officials in the town of Zugdidi. In response, Shevardnadze declared battle against them and sent troops to the town, which borders Abkhazia. The rebels proceeded to take the hostages to an unknown hiding-place in Abkhazia. The Georgian troops entered Abkhazia to free hostages, but also to enforce security at unprotected railroads, since the area was only loosely controlled by the government due to insurgency and the railroads were often robbed by unknown bands in that location, with one out of every 10 trains being targeted on average. However, the separatist militias clashed with the Georgian troops and the battle for Sokhumi began. Georgian tanks and APC's moved through the streets in Sukhumi, battling Abkhaz militias who were armed with machine guns and formed barricades in the streets, while hurling Molotov cocktails as they lacked heavy anti-tank weapons. Georgian units used artillery against Abkhaz separatists in the places they controlled within the city.

Despite Abkhaz resistance, the Georgian units were heavily armed and took the city within a matter of days. On 18 August, the Parliament of Abkhazia was stormed by the Georgian National Guard, and the Georgian flag was raised on the Council of Ministers buildings. All of Sukhumi was taken by August 18.

== Casualties and aftermath ==
On August 16, 19 people were killed and 39 severely injured, but on August 18 the death toll has increased to at least 50 people killed. Abkhaz separatists retreated to Guduata, and started to arm themselves for a counterattack.
