= Çalağan-Güney =

- Location within Azerbaijan Location within East Zangezur Economic Region
- Coordinates: 39°49′38″N 46°29′29″E
- Country: Azerbaijan
- Rayon: Lachin
- Time zone: UTC+4 (AZT)
  - Summer (DST): UTC+5 (AZT)

Çalağan-Güney (Chalaghan Guney) is a village in the Lachin District of Azerbaijan. The Battle of Chalagan was fought here in 1412.
