= Siege of Ganja (1213) =

1213 successful siege of the city of Ganja, by the Georgians under King George IV

- Part of Georgian–Seljuk wars
Date	1213
Location	Ganja, Arran. 40°40′58″N 46°21′38″E
Result	Georgian victory

Belligerents
Kingdom of Georgia	Eldiguzids

Commanders and leaders
George IV Lasha	Muzaffar al-Din Uzbek

Strength
4,000 (assault)	10,000

The siege of Ganja was the successful siege of the city of Ganja, by the Georgians under King George IV in 1213.

== Background ==
After Queen Tamar's death, the kingdom was inherited by her son George IV. The young king was no sooner crowned than Uzbek, Eldiguzid ruler of Ganja revolted and stopped bringing tribute to the King. Learning of this, King George called Darbazi – the supreme royal council – where he proposed punishing the atabeg of Ganja immediately. The nobles approved a campaign and with an ample army George IV set out to ravage Ganja.

== Siege ==
The Georgian army under Ivane Mkhargrdzeli immediately sent troops to Ganja and enforced Georgian suzerainty by besieging, instead of storming the city. George lost patience with his generals’ decision, detached 4,000 men from the siege force and circled Ganja. The Ganja garrison realized George’s vulnerability: 10,000 well-armed men left the citadel and attacked. The ensuing fighting, although the Georgians won, caused heavy casualties. Because Ganja’s besieged citizens were starving, Uzbek called for a truce. The atabeg of Ganja was compelled to continue paying the tribute and acknowledge himself a subject of Georgia. George IV was reprimanded and had to apologize when the military authorities scolded him for his wayward and willful behavior.

== Sources ==
- Rayfield, Donald (2012). Edges of Empire (Kindle ed.). Reaktion Books.
