= Battle of Chalagan =

1412 battle

- Part of Turkoman invasions of Georgia
Date	December, 1412
Location	Near Chalagan, Shirvan
Result	Qara Qoyunlu victory

Belligerents
Qara Qoyunlu	Shirvanshahs; Kingdom of Georgia; Princedom of Simsim

Commanders and leaders
Abu Nasr Qara Yusuf; Yar Ahmed Qaramanli	Ibrahim I (POW); Constantine I (executed); Syed Ahmed Orlat

Strength
	2,000 Georgians; Unknown number of Shirvanese and Durdzuks

Casualties and losses
Unknown	300 beheaded

The Battle of Chalagan was fought between the Qara Qoyunlu and the allied forces of Shirvanshahs, the Kingdom of Georgia and Princedom of Simsim at Chalagan, Shirvan, in December 1412, and resulted in Qara Qoyunlu’s victory.

== History ==
The conflict was preceded by the fall of the Timurid Empire immediately after the death of the great conqueror Timur (1405) and the subsequent clashes between the various clans in Azerbaijan.

Qara Yusuf marched on Shirvan, where Shirvanshah Ibrahim I, a loyal Timurid vassal was still reigning. Shirvan's former ally the Karabakh ruler Yar Ahmed Qaramanli sided with Qara Yusuf, while Ibrahim joined his forces with the ruler of Shaki, Syed Ahmed Orlat and King Constantine I of Georgia, who marched in the head of 2,000 Georgian cavalry to support the Shirvanese allies.

A major battle was fought at the village Chalagan in December 1412 and ended in a decisive defeat of the allies. Ibrahim and Constantine fell at the hands of the fierce enemy. The Georgian king, his brother, and 300 Georgian officers were beheaded by the orders of Abu Nasr Qara Yusuf.
