= Battle of Mokhisi =

16th century battle in the Caucasus region

Date	1520
Location	Mokhisi, Kingdom of Kartli 43°03′13″N 43°46′18″E
Result	Gurian victory

Belligerents
Principality of Guria	Kingdom of Kartli

Commanders and leaders
Mamia I Gurieli	David X of Kartli

The Battle of Mokhisi (Georgian: მოხისის ბრძოლა) was fought between the armies of the Kingdom of Kartli and the Principality of Guria at the place of Mokhisi in 1520.

== Background ==
George II of Kakheti led a series of unsuccessful raids into his western neighbor, kingdom of Kartli, ruled by a rival branch of the Bagrationi dynasty. In 1513, he was captured and put in prison, while his kingdom was taken over by David X of Kartli. George's heir, Levan was taken by loyal nobles to the mountains and kept there clandestinely until 1518, when they capitalized on the invasion of Kartli by Ismail I, the Safavid Shah of Iran, and proclaimed Levan king of Kakheti. David X led his army against Kakheti, but failed to seize Levan and withdrew. In 1520, Mamia I Gurieli was approached by Levan, now king of Kakheti in eastern Georgia, with the request that he marry his daughter to Levan and aid the king against the encroachments of King David X of Kartli.

== Battle ==
Mamia, having secured for his troops a free passage from the atabeg of Samtskhe, traversed Ghado mountain, advanced into Kartli and defeated David X at Mokhisi. The latter fell back to his capital of Tbilisi and was setting a counter-attack in motion, when a dignitary, sent by Gurieli for parley, persuaded the king to join Mamia and Levan of Kakheti at a peace summit at Mukhrani. After the peace arrangement, Mamia sent his daughter Tinatin to marry Levan.
