= Rusudan of Georgia =

Queen of Georgia from 1223 to 1245

Rusudan
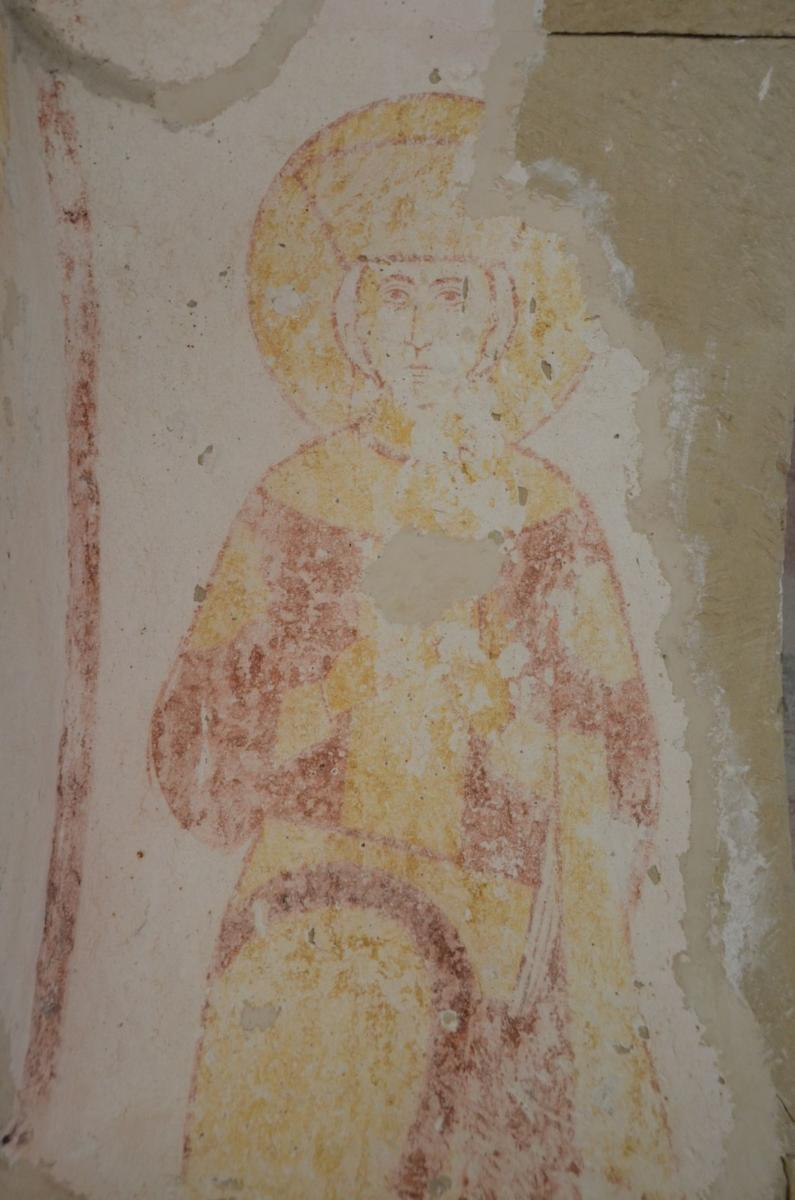
- Fresco inside Gelati monastery thought to depict Rusudan

Queen of Georgia
- Reign: 1223–1245
- Predecessor: George IV
- Successor: David VII; David VI
- Born: 1194
- Died: 1245 (aged 50–51); Tbilisi
- Burial: Gelati Monastery
- Spouse: Ghias ad-din
- Issue: Tamar; David VI
- Dynasty: Bagrationi
- Father: David Soslan
- Mother: Tamar of Georgia
- Religion: Georgian Orthodox Church
- Khelrtva

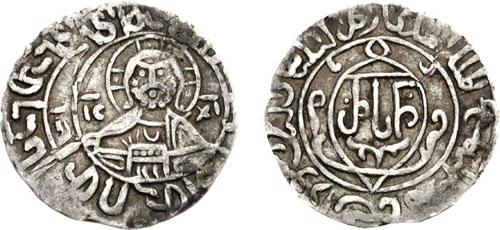
Coin of Rusudan, 1230

Rusudan (Georgian: რუსუდანი, romanized: rusudani; 1194–1245) was the queen regnant (mepe) of Georgia from 1223 to 1245. A member of the Bagrationi dynasty, she was the daughter of Queen Tamar of Georgia by David Soslan and succeeded her brother George IV in 1223. During her reign, Georgia was attacked by the Khwarezmian ruler Jalal al-Din Mangburni, who was fleeing the Mongols. Years of destructive war, which included the sacking of the Georgian capital of Tbilisi, left Georgia incapable of resistance when the Mongols arrived. In 1239, she assented to a treaty with the Mongols, which obliged Georgia to provide tribute to the Mongols in gold and military. After her death in 1245, she was succeeded by her son David VI and her nephew David VII.

== Life ==
Daughter of Queen Tamar of Georgia by David Soslan, she succeeded her brother George IV on 18 January 1223. George's untimely death marked the beginning of the end of the Georgian Golden Age. Rusudan was unable to preserve whatever was gained by her mother and brother. She was known as a beautiful woman devoted to pleasure, whose hand was sought by her Muslim neighbors. In Muslim sources, such as Ata-Malik Juvayni, Rusudan was known as Qiz-Malik, from the Turkish qiz, "maiden", and the Arabic malik, "king".

In the autumn of 1225, Georgia was attacked by the Khwarazmshah Jalal al-Din Mangburni, pursued by the Mongols. The Georgians suffered bitter defeat at the Battle of Garni, and the royal court with Queen Rusudan moved to Kutaisi when the Georgian capital Tbilisi was besieged by the Khwarezmians. A year later, on 9 March 1226, Jalal ad-Din took Tbilisi. The citizens fought courageously and over 100,000 lost their lives when the city fell to the Khwarezmians. The defeated Georgians were ordered to change religion and become Muslims, but they refused and almost the whole population of Tbilisi was massacred. In February 1227, the Georgians took advantage of Jalal ad-Din's failures in Armenia and retook Tbilisi, but soon were forced to abandon the city – which they themselves had set alight in their battle with the occupation forces. Rusudan made an alliance with the neighbouring Seljuk rulers of Rum and Ahlat, but the Georgians were routed by the Khwarezmians at Battle of Bolnisi before their allies could arrive (1228).

The Khwarezmians were superseded by the Mongols. They advanced into Georgia in 1235. Devastated and plundered by Jalal ad-Din's incursions, Georgia surrendered without any serious resistance. By 1239, all the country was under the Mongol yoke and had to accept the Georgian–Mongolian treaty of 1239. Rusudan had to pay an annual tribute of 50,000 gold pieces and support the Mongols with a Georgian army of 80,000 soldiers.

Fearing that her nephew David would aspire to the throne, Rusudan held him prisoner at the court of her son-in-law, the sultan Kaykhusraw II, and sent her son David to the Mongol court to get his official recognition as heir apparent. She died in 1245, still waiting for her son to return.

== Family and personal life ==
In 1224, Rusudan married the Seljuk prince Ghias ad-Din, a grandson of Kilij Arslan II, who converted to Christianity upon their marriage. They had two children:

- David VI (1225–1293), King of Georgia with his cousin David VII from 1246 to 1256. Afterwards, from 1259 until his death in 1293, he ruled the Kingdom of Western Georgia, under the name of David I.
- Tamar Gurju Khatun, who married her cousin, Sultan Kaykhusraw II. After his death in 1246, she married Mu'in al-Din Parwana as part of the preconditions for the peace settlement.

Ghias ad-Din's position at the Georgian court was weak and the spousal relationship was strained due to Rusudan's unfaithfulness. Reporting her scandalous love affairs and adulterous way of life, Ibn al-Athir recounts that on one occasion Rusudan was surprised by her husband in bed in the arms of a slave ("mamluke"). As Ghias ad-Din refused to condone this fact, Ibn al-Athir continues, Rusudan had him moved to "another town" under strict supervision. His name does not appear on coins issued in the name of Rusudan.

== Sources ==
- Wilhelm Baum (2007). "Rusudani (Russutuna)". In Bautz, Traugott (ed.). Biographisch-Bibliographisches Kirchenlexikon (BBKL) (in German). Vol. 27. Nordhausen: Bautz. cols. 1179–1184. ISBN 978-3-88309-393-2.
- Djaparidze, Gotcha I. (1995). Sakartvelo da makhlobeli aghmosavletis islamuri samq’aro XII-XIII s-is p’irvel mesamedshi საქართველო და მახლობელი აღმოსავლეთის ისლამური სამყარო XII-XIII ს-ის პირველ მესამედში [Georgia and the Near Eastern Islamic world in the 12th–13th century] (PDF) (in Georgian). Tbilisi: Metsniereba.
- Richards, Donald Sidney, ed. (2010). The Chronicle of Ibn Al-Athir for the Crusading Period from Al-kamil Fi'l-ta'rikh, Part 3: The Years 589-629/1193-1231: the Ayyubids After Saladin and the Mongol Menace. Farnham: Ashgate Publishing. ISBN 978-0754669524.

Rusudan of Georgia Bagrationi dynasty
Preceded by George IV	King of Georgia; 1223–1245	Succeeded by David VI
