= Siege of Birtvisi (1403) =

1403 battle in Georgia

- Part of Timurid invasions of Georgia
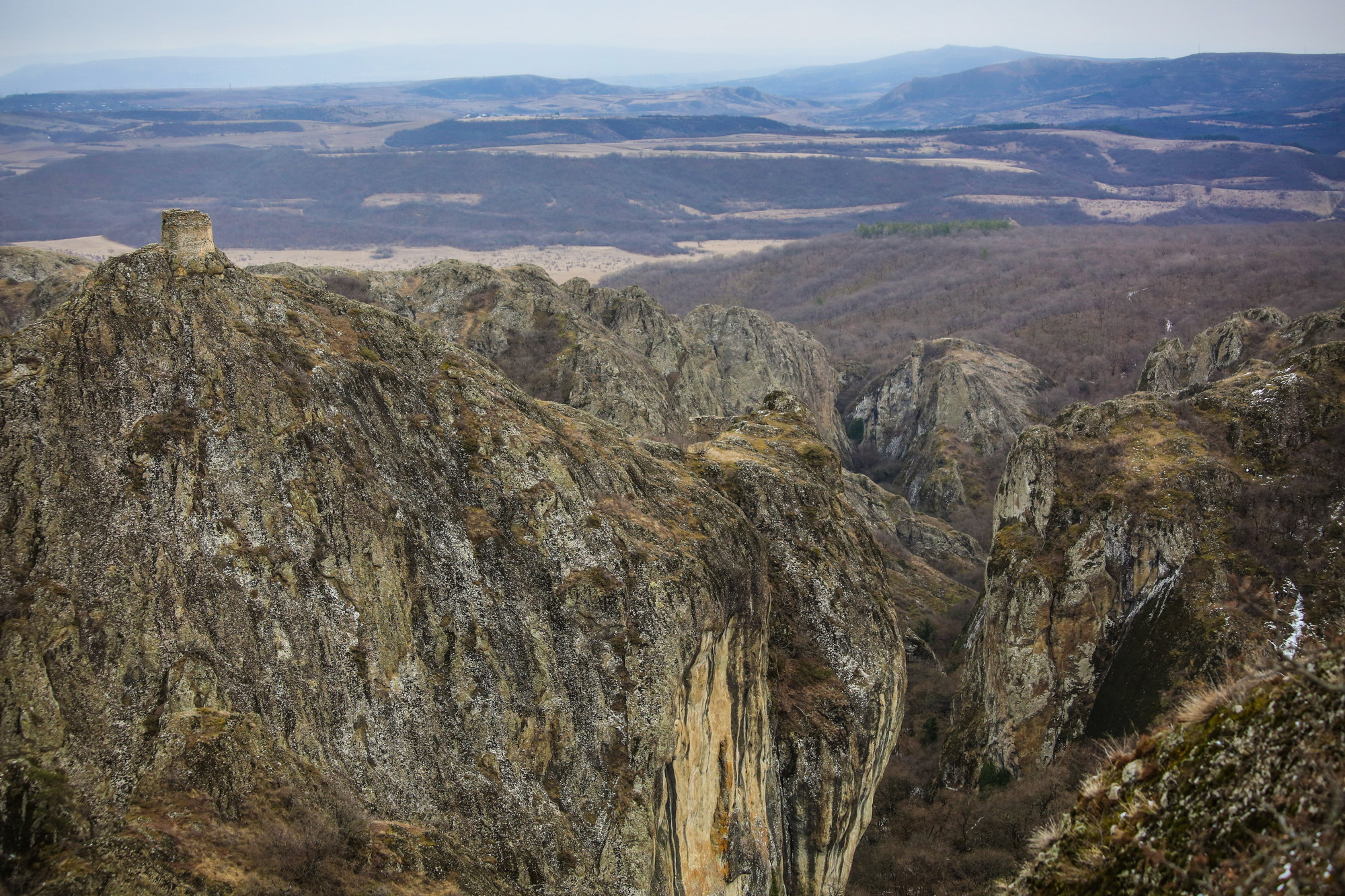
- The Birtvisi canyon with the Sheupovari tower on top of a rock
Date	1403
Location	Birtvisi, Kingdom of Georgia
Result	Timurid victory

Belligerents
Timurid Empire; Shirvanshah	Kingdom of Georgia

Commanders and leaders
Timur; Ibrahim I	Ivane Toreli

The siege of Birtvisi was a siege laid by the Timurid sultan, Timur, against Birtvisi Fortress in eastern Georgia in 1403, as part of the Timurid invasions of Georgia from 1386 to 1403.

== Battle ==
In medieval Georgia, the fortress Birtvisi entertained a reputation of an impregnable stronghold whose master could control the entire strategic Algeti gorge. In 1403, Timur sent his vassal, Shah Ibrahim of Shirvan to lead an attack on the fortress. The defense of the fortress was led by Ivane Toreli, who commanded 150 soldiers in addition to 30 Aznauri and their families. It took eight attempts for Timurid forces to subdue the fortress. On 12 August, the gates were stormed by 52 Merkit volunteers who were experts at rock climbing. The surviving defenders were killed and their wives and children given to Ibrahim's officers. Commander Ivane Toreli's wife was added to Ibrahim's harem.
