= Bombing of Tbilisi =

Bombing of Georgian capital in 2008 by Russia

- Part of the Russo-Georgian War
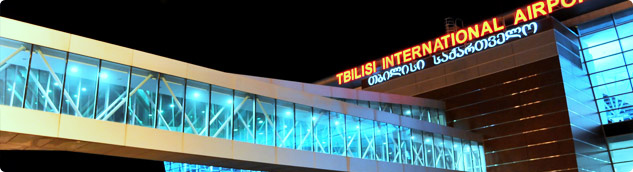
- Tbilisi International Airport, Georgia
- Location: Tbilisi and surrounding areas, Georgia
- Date: 9–12 August 2008
- Target: Civilians, infrastructure, military targets
- Attack type: Missile attack, air raid
- Deaths: 11 killed (estimates vary)
- Injuries: dozens according to Human Rights Watch
- Perpetrator: Russian Air Force

The Bombing of Tbilisi was a major event during the 2008 Russian invasion of Georgia, when units of the Russian Air Force attacked and bombed Tbilisi between the 9th and 12th in August 2008. It was the second deadliest attack during the war, and estimates suggest it claimed the lives of anywhere between 11, 400 or 850 people.

== Background ==
During the Battle of the Kodori Valley, Russian ships were deployed to the Black Sea coast of Georgia with the aim of enforcing a blockade. According to the Russian Navy, the Russian Black Sea Fleet ships reached Georgia on 10 August 2008. Though much before this, on 9 August, Russian Prime Minister Vladimir Putin arrived in Vladikavkaz, North Ossetia to oversee Russia's military actions.

== The bombing ==
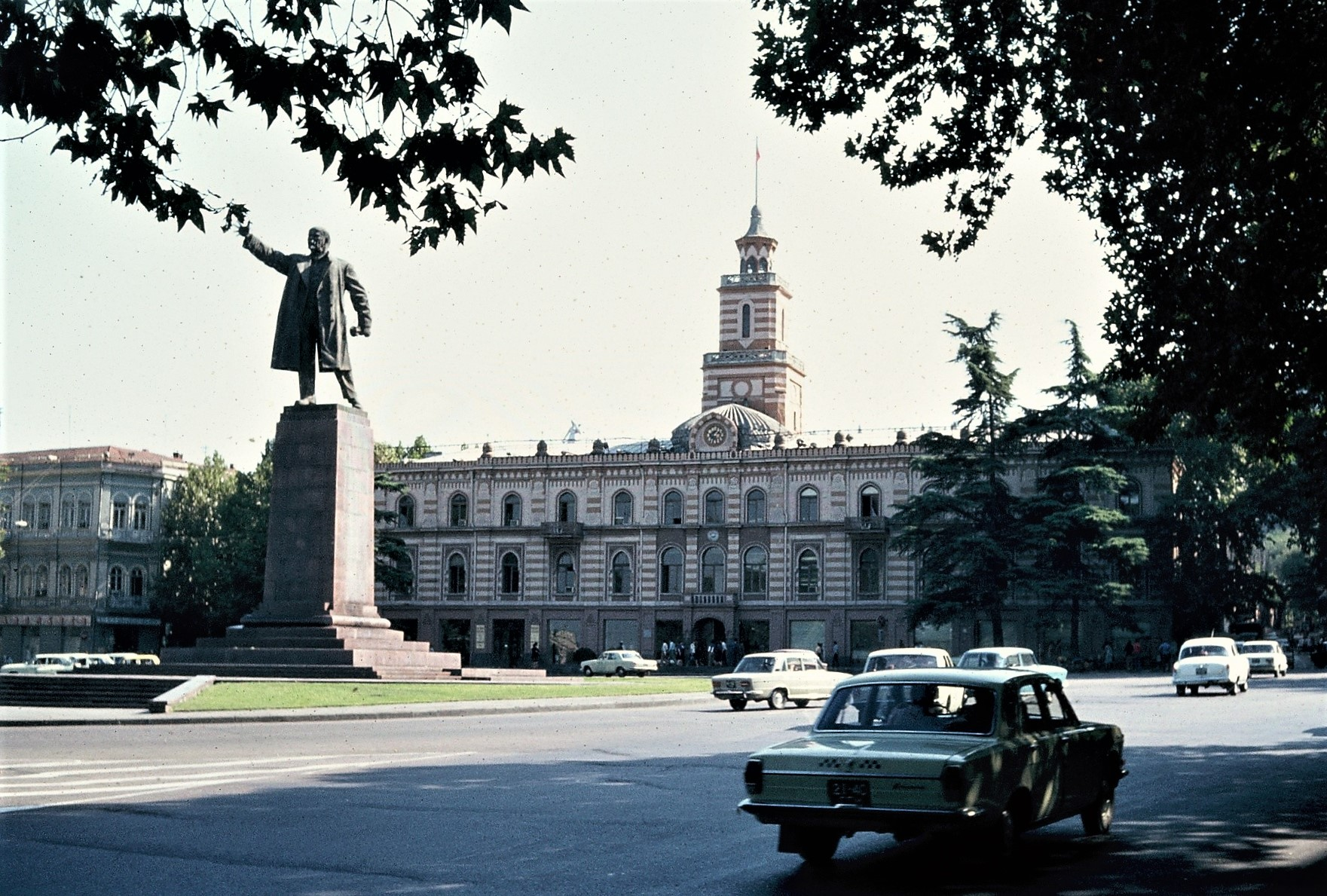
Tbilisi City Hall in 1979

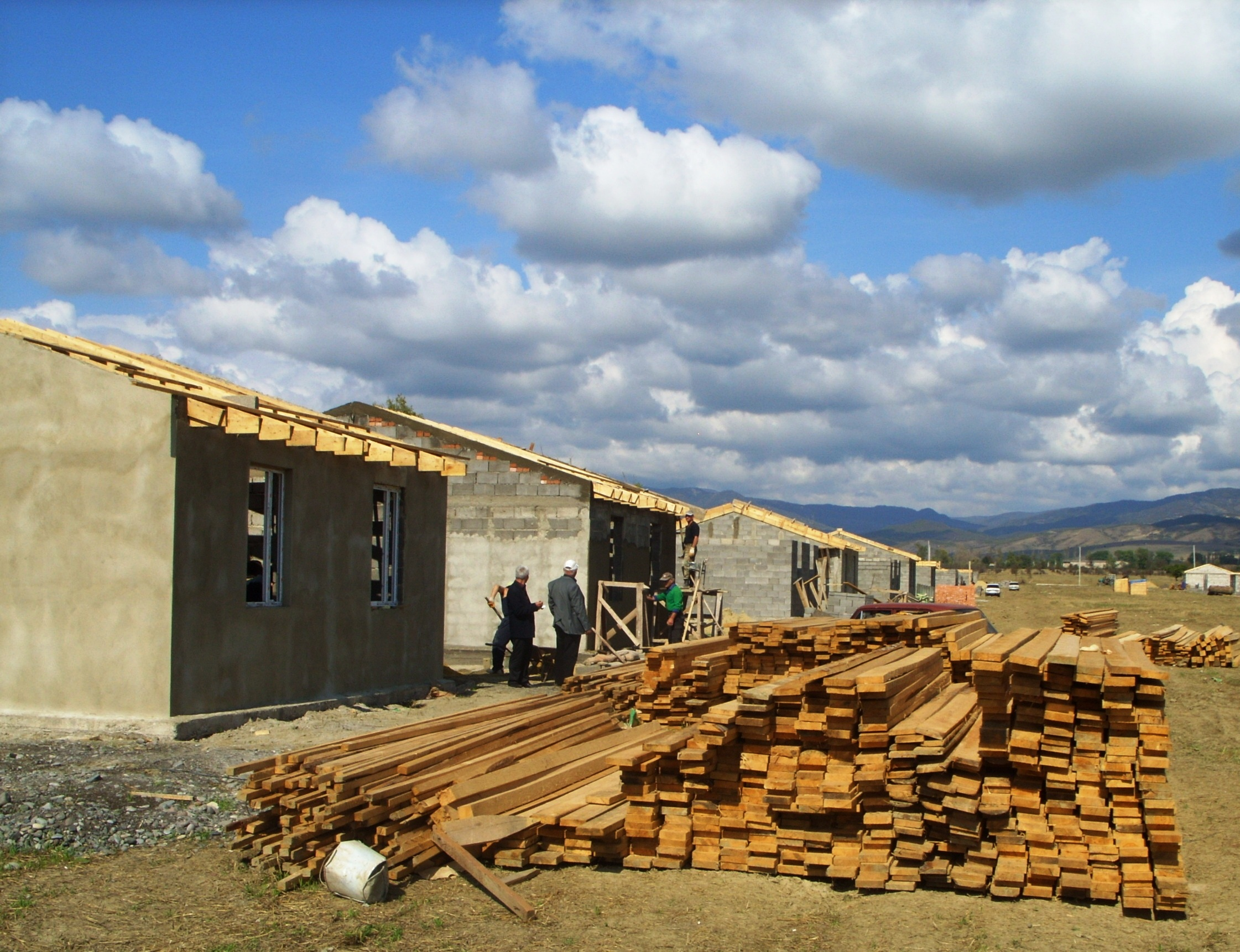
construction of houses for refugees near Gori in 2008

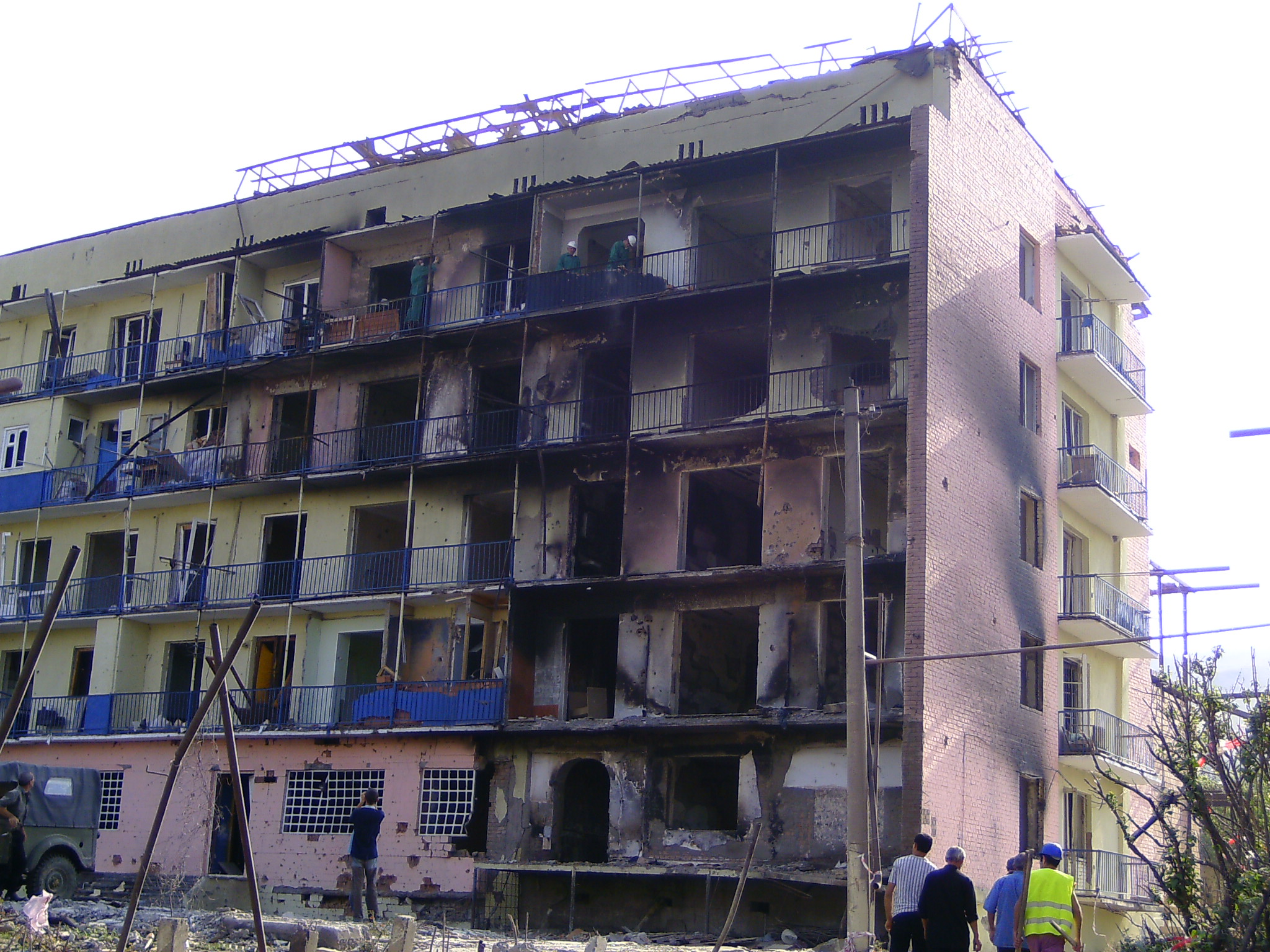
Destroyed apartment houses in Georgia

Bombings and air raids began on 9 August, and after a series of Russian air bombings across the country, governmental buildings in Tbilisi began to be evacuated. on 10 August at around 5:30 a.m GMT, Russia bombed the Vaziani and Baku-Supsa oil pipeline near Tbilisi. 10 minutes later at 5:40, Russian aircraft dropped three bombs on the Tbilisi International Airport's runway. Georgian President Mikhail Saakashvili reported one of the Russian raids on the airport came a half hour before the arrival of the foreign ministers of France and Finland. They came to the country to attempt to mediate. An aircraft plant in the outskirts of Tbilisi was also bombed, and was bombed again at 7pm that evening. Human Rights Watch researchers revealed that Russian aircraft dropped cluster bombs in populated areas in Georgia, killing at least 11 civilians and injuring dozens. “Cluster bombs are indiscriminate killers that most nations have agreed to outlaw,” said Marc Garlasco, senior military analyst at Human Rights Watch. “Russia's use of this weapon is not only deadly to civilians, but also an insult to international efforts to avoid a global humanitarian disaster of the kind caused by landmines.” HRW reported Russian aircraft dropped RBK-250 cluster bombs, each containing 30 PTAB 2.5M submunitions. Researchers interviewed numerous victims, doctors, and military personnel in Georgia. One day later, on 11 August, bombs were dropped on a radar station in the Tbilisi area and Shiraki airfield in Kakheti (eastern Georgia). A man who was interviewed by Al Jazeera said, "We detected a lot of objects moving from [inaudible] on our monitors, and as usual we sent our information to the control point and then we saw three jets moving from Azerbaijan. Then we got an order to leave the radar building." The same day, hundreds of civilians, having fled, gathered outside of Tbilisi City Hall, hoping to get shelter.

== Aftermath ==
According to multiple sources, the death and injury tolls vary, and the death toll could be anywhere from 11 to 850. However, Tbilisi itself did not suffer significant casualties from these strikes as they largely targeted military infrastructure such as radar stations. Civilian casualties in Tbilisi were minimal compared to other areas like Gori and surrounding regions, which endured more direct and destructive attacks.
