= Tsikhisdziri, Kobuleti Municipality =

Tsikhisdziri ციხისძირი
- Village
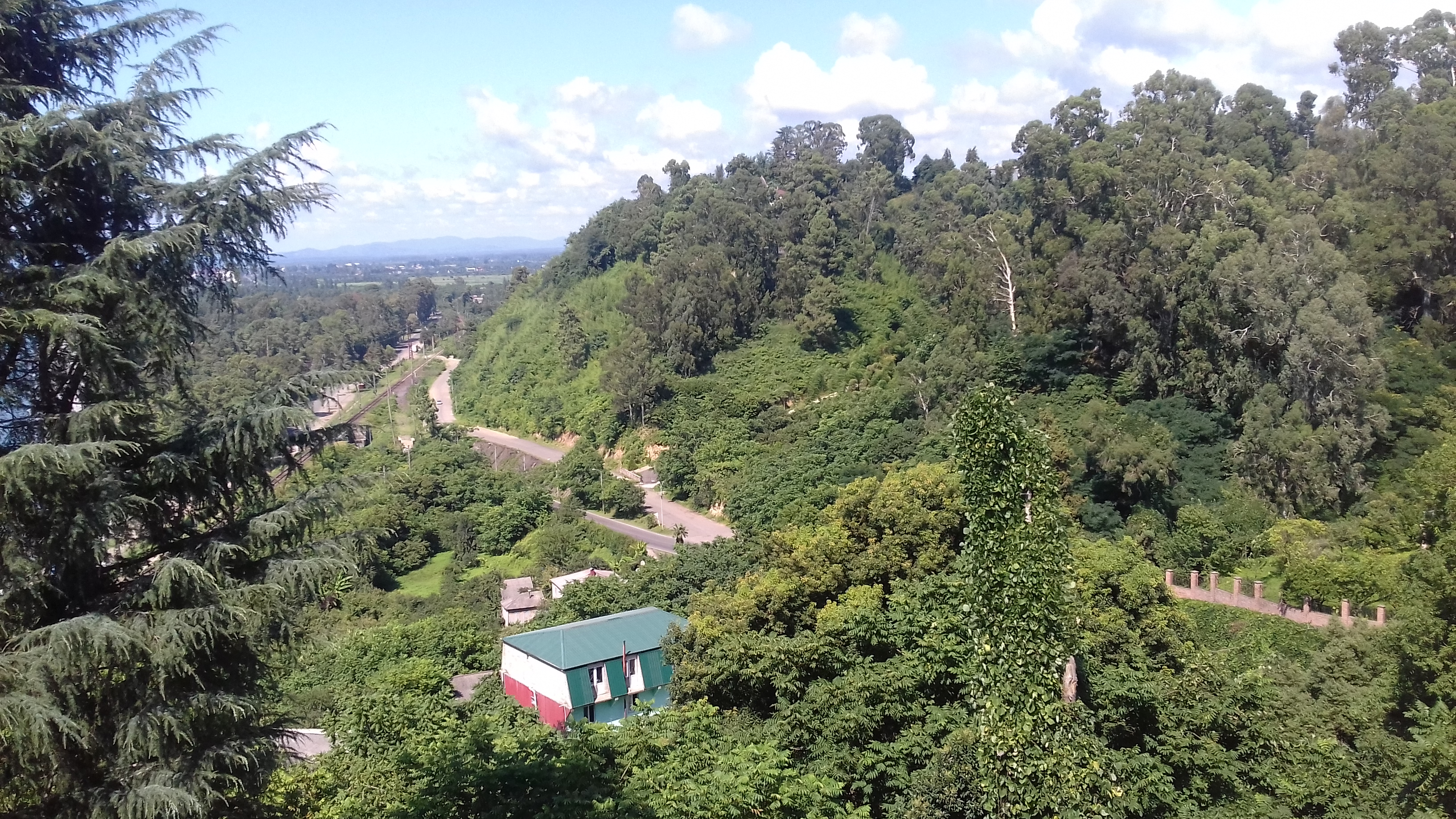
- Environs of Tsikhisdziri as seen from the Petra fortress

- Location of Tsikhisdziri
- Coordinates: 41°45′43″N 41°45′14″E
- Country: Georgia
- Autonomous Republic: Adjara
- Municipality: Kobuleti
- Elevation: 75 m (246 ft)

Population (2014)
  - Total: 2,472
- Time zone: UTC+4 (Georgian Time)

Tsikhisdziri (Georgian: ციხისძირი) is a village in the Kobuleti Municipality, Autonomous Republic of Adjara, Georgia, on the Black Sea coast, 8 km south of the town of Kobuleti. Tsikhisdziri is home to an archaeological site and ruins of a Late Antique fortified town, which is identified by mainstream scholarship with the Roman-built city-fortress of Petra.

== Archaeology ==
=== Artifacts ===
The Tsikhisdziri site is located on a rocky coastline of the Black Sea, at the modern-day village. Systematic archaeological study of the site began in 1962 and yielded several layers of human settlement and various artifacts, the earliest of which date to the Late Bronze Age, when the area fell within the Colchian culture area. North of Tsikhisdziri, at Bobokvati, some 200 m from the coastline, dune-settlements, dating to the 8th century BC, were uncovered. In the following centuries, a series of ancient Greek colonies were established along the eastern Black Sea littoral. There is no literary evidence that a Greek colony existed at Tsikhisdziri, but archaeological excavations revealed the 5th-century BC burials of adults and of children in amphorae, set down into levels of earlier dune-settlement. Artifacts unearthed there include an Attic skyphos of Corinthian type and lekythos of the Haimon painter, dated to c. 470.

A collection of the 3rd-century AD items—gold jewelry, silver and bronze vessels, beads, and coins—and now known as the Tsikhisdziri treasure was found there in 1907 and then acquired by the Hermitage Museum in Saint Petersburg, Russia. Part of this collection is a rock crystal intaglio depicting a bearded man identified as the Roman emperor Lucius Verus: the design was gilded and the stone was polished to allow the image to be seen through the transparent material. The Roman presence in this area is also evidenced by a large brick found in the ruins of Tsikhisdziri with an inscription that has been interpreted as VEX[illatio]FA[siana], suggesting that the brick—now in possession of the Janashia Museum of Georgia in Tbilisi—was made in a Roman military workshop in Phasis and shipped south.

=== Architecture ===
The Tsikhisdziri fortress was situated on two coastal hills, connected to each other through double walls. On the territory of the citadel, the area of which totals around 1.5 h, are the ruins of a 6th-century three-nave basilica with the dimensions of 33X17.80 m, with narthex, projecting apse, and floor mosaic, and remains of two other churches, one from the early Christian period and the other dated to the High Middle Ages. Close to the basilica is a 6th-century bath (9.5X6.5 m) and a water cistern. North to the citadel are the ruins of an urban settlement and hundreds of burials. These structures date from the Late Antiquity to the Middle Ages.

Tsikhisdziri

== History ==
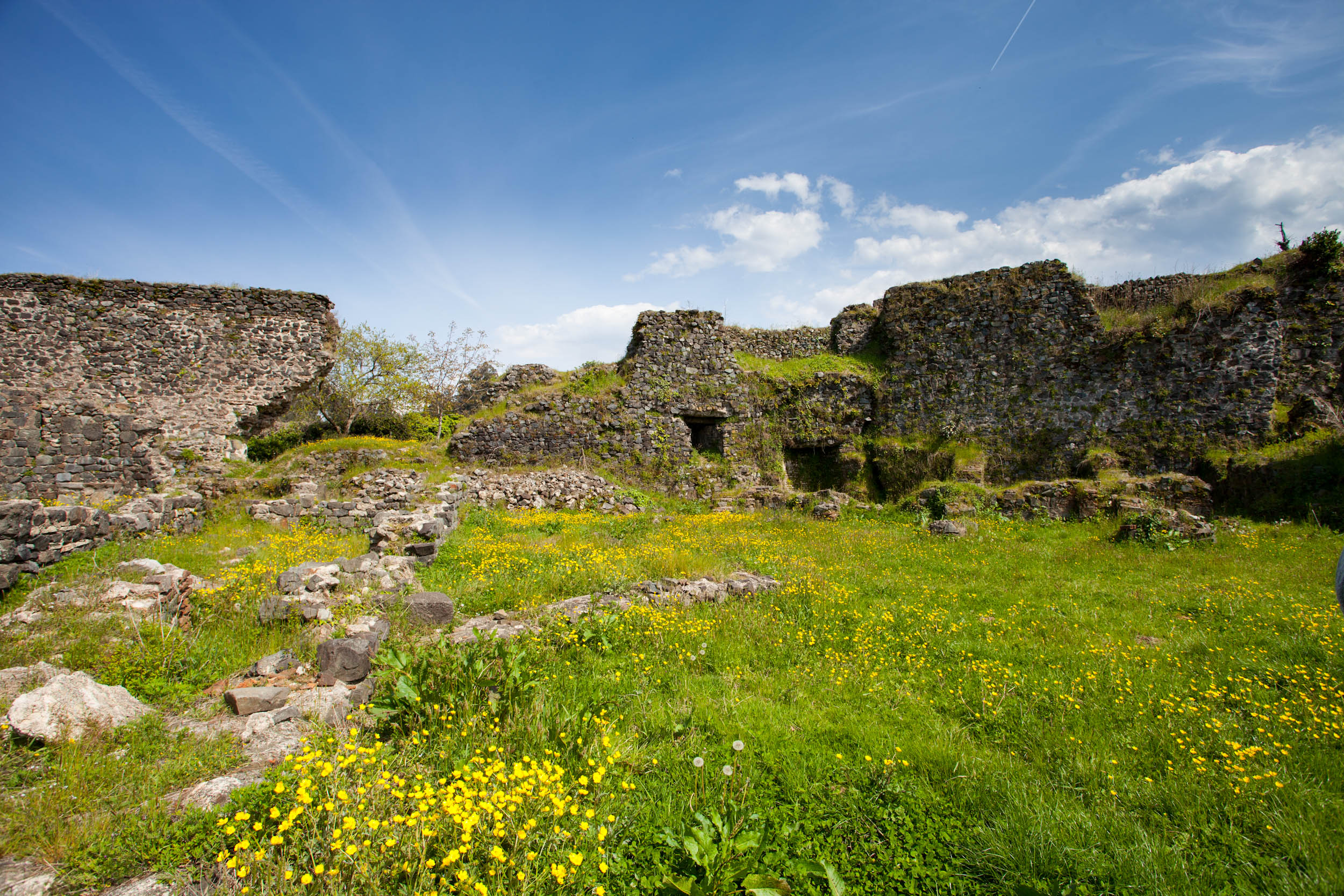
The ruins of ancient Petra

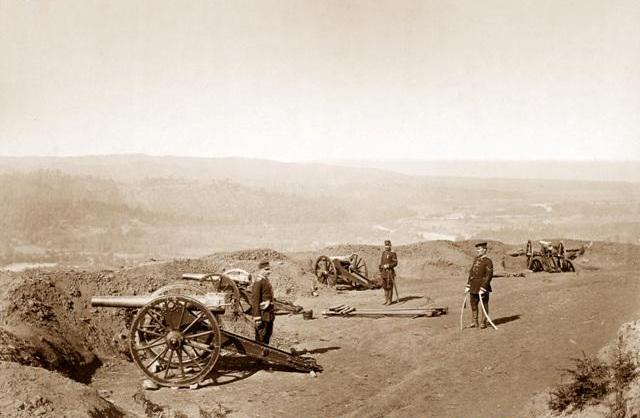
Russian artillery positions at Tsikhisdziri during the Russo-Turkish War (1877–78).

The Tsikhisdziri site is identified by the mainstream scholarly opinion with the Roman city–fortress of Petra, founded at the behest of the emperor Justinian I in 535 and, after a series of battles for the possession of that city during the Lazic War with Sasanid Iran, demolished by the Romans themselves to prevent it again becoming the enemy's target in 551. Later, the locale continued to be home to a stronghold of some importance, namely, the Devils' Fortress, ts'ikhe k'ajet'isa, mentioned by the Georgian scholar Prince Vakhushti of Kartli in his 1745 geography as situated near the small town of Kobuleti, on "the edge of the sea,...strong, built on a high cliff, possessing a rocky tunnel, curved as a road".

By Vakhushti's time, the village had been under the Ottoman sway. During the Russo-Turkish War (1828–29), Tsikhisdziri, then one of the frontier settlements between the Ottoman-dominated Adjara and the Russian-controlled Guria, saw fighting between the two empires. It was there that, in September 1829, the Ottoman commander of Muslim Georgian background, Ahmed-Pasha, repulsed an invasion by the Russian general Karl Hesse. During the Russo-Turkish War (1877–78), the Ottoman military heavily fortified the heights of Tsikhisdziri, which allowed them to successfully block two Russian attempts to capture Tsikhisdziri and advance towards Batumi on 12 April 1877 and 18 January 1878. However, an eventual defeat in the war forced the Ottomans to cede Adjara to Russia. In the Soviet period, Tsikhisdziri became one of a series of sea resorts in southwestern Georgia and continues to enjoy summertime visitors to this day.

== Population ==
As of the 2014 national census, Tsikhisdziri had a population of 2,472. Most of them (97%) are ethnic Georgians.

Population	2002 census	2014 census
Total	2,253	2,472
