= Khwarazmian–Georgian wars =

1225–1229 series of wars

Khwarazmian–Georgia clashes
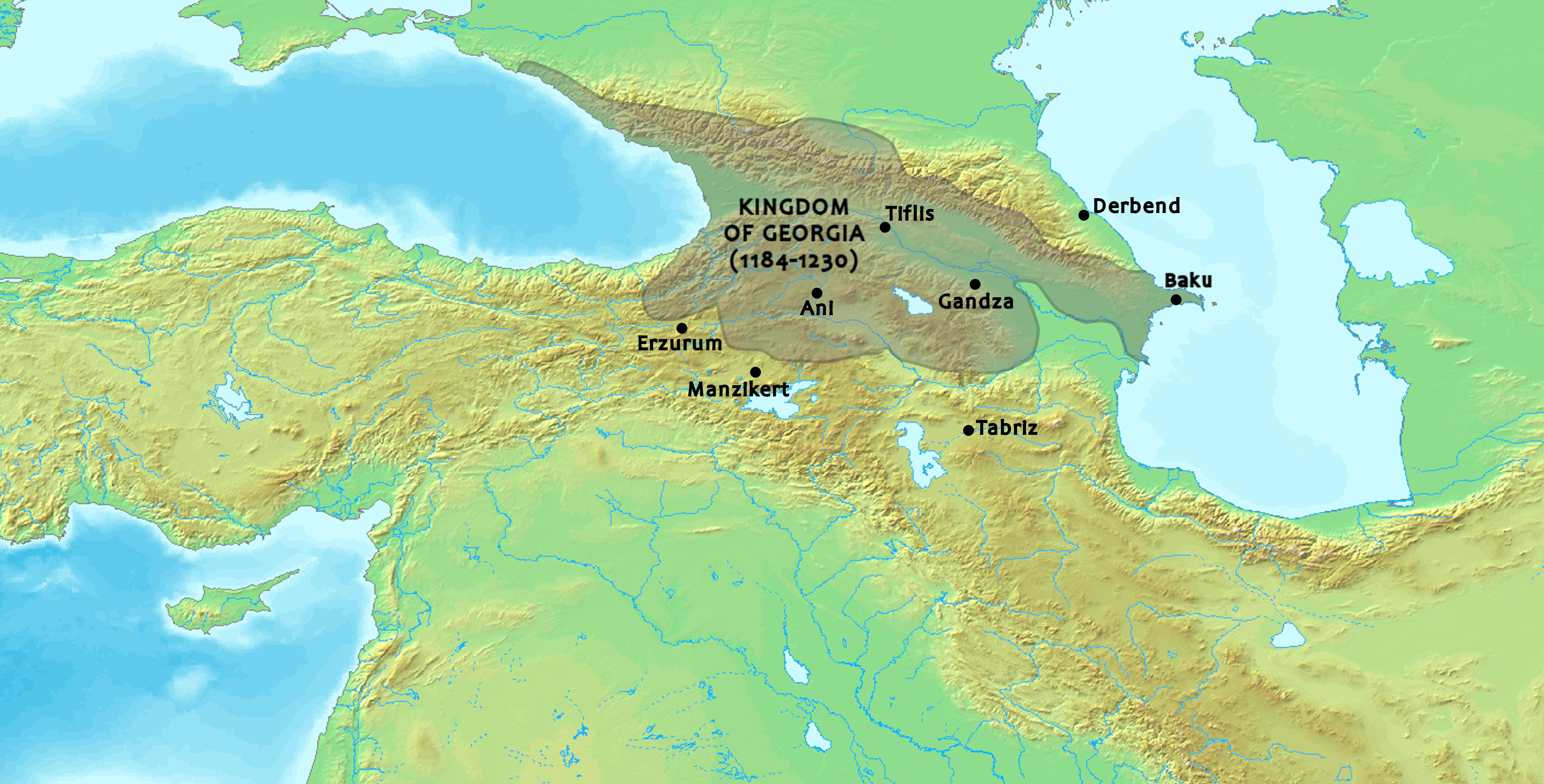
- Kingdom of Georgia in 1230
Date	1225–1229
Location	Kingdom of Georgia 41°27′N 44°32′E
Result	Khwarazmian victory

Belligerents
Khwarazmian Empire: Eldiguzids	Kingdom of Georgia: Lezgins; Alans; Svans; Durdzuks; Circassians (Jiks); Sultanate of Rum; Ayyubid dynasty

Commanders and leaders
Jalal al-Din Mangburni; Muzaffar al-Din Uzbek	Rusudan of Georgia; Avag Zakarian; Ivane I Zakarian

Khwarazmian–Georgian wars (Georgian: ხვარაზმულ-ქართული ომები) also known as Jalal al-Din's invasions of Georgia, was a military engagement between Jalal al-Din Mangburni of Khwarazmian Empire and Rusudan of Georgia of Kingdom of Georgia. The war lasted till 1229 with Jalal al-Din's victory.

== Background ==
The Mongol invasion of the Khwarazmian Empire commenced in 1219 when Genghis Khan initiated a comprehensive attack in response to the Khwarazmian Shah, Ala ad-Din Muhammad II, ordered the execution of a Mongol trading caravan and his envoys. The speed and ferocity with which the Mongol warriors advanced across the entirety of Central Asia was astounding, assimilating and eradicating major towns and cities such as Bukhara, Samarkand, and Urgench. Although the Shah ruled over a realm of great expanse, he was entirely unable to coordinate any semblance of defense and fled to the west before dying in exile. By 1221, the Mongol campaign would result in the complete dissolution of the Khwarazmian Empire, defined by large scale slaughter, the obliteration of cities and towns, and a complete restructuring of the political landscape of the Islamic world.

== History ==
=== Clashes ===
The Kingdom of Georgia was the foremost power in the Caucasus in the early 13th century. The Kingdom had greatly expanded its influence in the Caucasus since it took Tbilisi in 1122. In 1225, Georgian forces began penetrating the territory of the Atabeg Uzbek, which is now in Azerbaijan. During one campaign, Georgian troops met logistical problems on the way through a narrow mountain pass, which delayed and stalled their advance. Thus, the Atabeg forces launched a successful counterattack against the Georgians to stop their advance.

After their failure, the Georgians began mobilizing to counterattack. However, they were informed that Jalal al-Din Khwarazmshah had recently arrived at Maragha, and therefore the Georgians would not be able to coordinate with Uzbek because he would have to reorient his forces to counter the Khwarazmian threat before he could coordinate with Uzbek, and before any coordination was developed, Jalal al-Din advanced into the region.

However, by this point Georgian incursions into cities under Muslim control like Ahlat, Azerbaijan, Arran, Erzurum, and Derbend had wreaked havoc on significant parts of cities before it changed hands to Georgians. These cities were very close to the borders of Georgia, and it was common for cities in this region to lose life, to suffer from occupations, and to lose property through pillaging and raids from Georgian forces. Muslim sources from that era preserve both the suffering and degrading experiences of the local population from Georgian engagements.

During the early 13th century and Queen Rusudan's rule over Georgia, Georgia was invaded by Jalal al-Din Mangburni of the Khwarazmian Empire. After waging wars in Islamic countries and making his way to the Caucasus, he and his troops were met with adversity when they invaded Georgia. Georgian forces, led by Ivane Mkhargrdzeli, were defeated near Garni, and Georgian soldiers fled into the nearby caves. The sacking of Dvin marked Jalal al-Din's first major victory in the region.

Despite Jalal al-Din's earlier resolve to take Tbilisi, he heard of unrest in Tabriz and after jail raids by the anti-dynasty Karakoyunlu Turkish tribesmen, he turned back. His vizier Orhan, however, conquered towns in Azerbeijan, including Beylagan and Shamkir. Following Ramadan in Tabriz, Jalal al-Din returned to the Georgian campaign. On the outskirts of Tbilisi, a small reconnaissance detachment sent by Jalal al-Din cut through the army's defenses as it tricked the Georgian defenders into ambushes and reduced them to a position of retreat.

On March 9, 1226, after a very brief siege, Tbilisi was taken. There was a slight resistance at the gate and one bridge was destroyed, but the Khwarazmian troops were able to cross the river and take the city. Some residents were given amnesty in exchange for their goods, while others managed to escape.

While managing his affairs in Kirman, Jalal al-Din received messages from his vizier in Tbilisi warning of an Ayyubid threat from Ahlat. However, garnering conflict, Sheref al-Mulk, the administrator, had raided in the Erzurum region and taken prisoners and loot and then met forces of Malek Ashraf. Sheref al-Mulk, fearing retaliation had asked the Sultan to return. Although this was presented as a defensive move, this likely hid preparations for an offensive towards Ahlat. It appears that Jalal al-Din's limited movements in Abkhazia and Tbilisi, which serve only to the extent of a diversion, permitted him to gather his forces and move towards Ahlat in late 1226 after his unsuccessful attempts to take Ani and Kars.

While Jalal al-Din focused his attention on Ahlat, Georgian forces would ultimately capture and burn Tbilisi in the early months of 1227. Juveyni states that Sultan returned to find the city deserted. Some sources have the Georgians retaking the city in 1229. The demise of Tbilisi is attributed to a lack of governance, Khwarazmian guards retreating, and the cooperation of local Muslims with the Georgians.

New campaigns began in 1227–1228 by Jalal al-Din, taking Lori and defeating a coalition of the Georgians near Bolnisi. His opposing forces were a mix of Lezgins, Alans, Svans, Armenians, and other contingents from the Seljuks and Ayyubids. Despite military victories, however, he had difficulty governing.

== See also ==
- Military history of Georgia
- Georgian–Seljuk wars
