= Darbazi (State Council) =

The Darbazi (Georgian: დარბაზი) was the medieval Georgian council of state, introduced by king David IV of Georgia (c. 1073–1125) as part of his government reforms. It functioned as a council of representatives from Didebulis (high aristocracy) and from the church hierarchy. The council was non-mandatory in the decision of major questions of government and the king could, at his discretion, take the will of the "darbazi" into consideration. The rights and obligations of the Darbazi were significantly widened after an insurrection by Qutlu Arslan and his faction. It was the result of a social struggle that marked a further step in the advancement of Georgian society, however some historians believe that this extensions of the rights of the "Darbazi" was a victory for the "Didebulis". Some other historians believe that in addition to members of the higher secular and ecclesiastical nobility, the "Darbazi" included representatives of the merchant-class.
