= Capture of Tabriz (1210) =

Georgian capture of Tabriz

- Part of Georgian-Seljuk wars
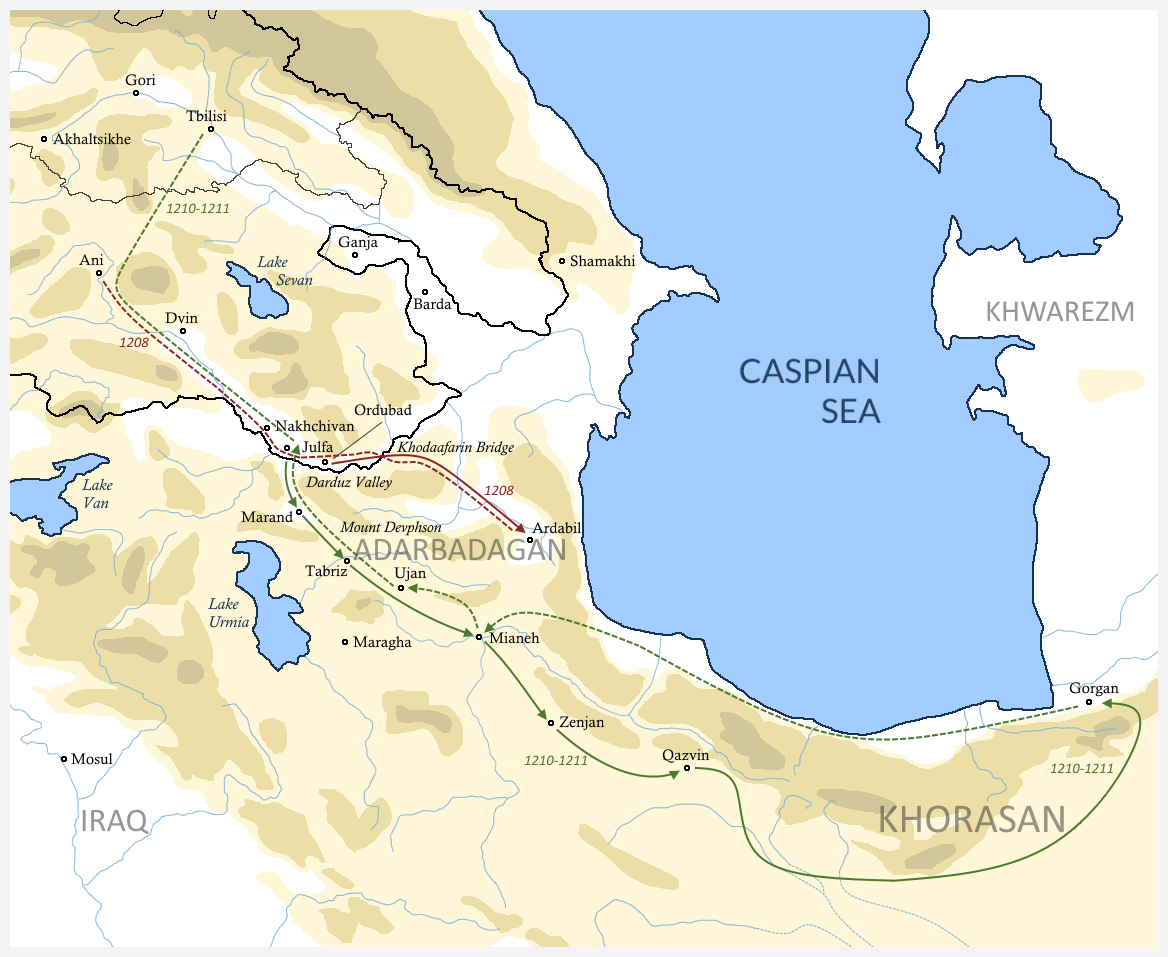
- Georgian invasion of Eldiguzids
Date	1210
Location	Tabriz, Iran 38°04′N 46°18′E
Result	Armeno-Georgian victory

Belligerents
Kingdom of Georgia; Zakarid Armenia	Eldiguzids

Commanders and leaders
Zakare II Zakarian; Ivane I Zakarian	Unknown

The capture of Tabriz (Georgian თავრიზის აღება) was a military raid carried out by the Zakarids and the Kingdom of Georgia around 1210 or 1211, during the reign of Queen Tamar. It was part of a larger Armeno-Georgian campaign against the weakening Eldiguzid dynasty, a Turkic Muslim state controlling much of modern-day Azerbaijan and parts of Iran.

== Capture of Tabriz ==
After the capture of Marand, the Armenians and Georgians marched to Tabriz. It was expected that such a large Iranian city would not surrender to the enemy without a fight, but as if they heard the arrival of the Georgian army, all the inhabitants of Tabriz were frightened and gathered together, immediately the governors of the city organized an embassy and surrounded the Georgians. The commanders promised peace to the Tabrizians in exchange for a large tribute, gifts, gold and horses and camels.
