= Hovhannavank =

Medieval monastery in Armenia

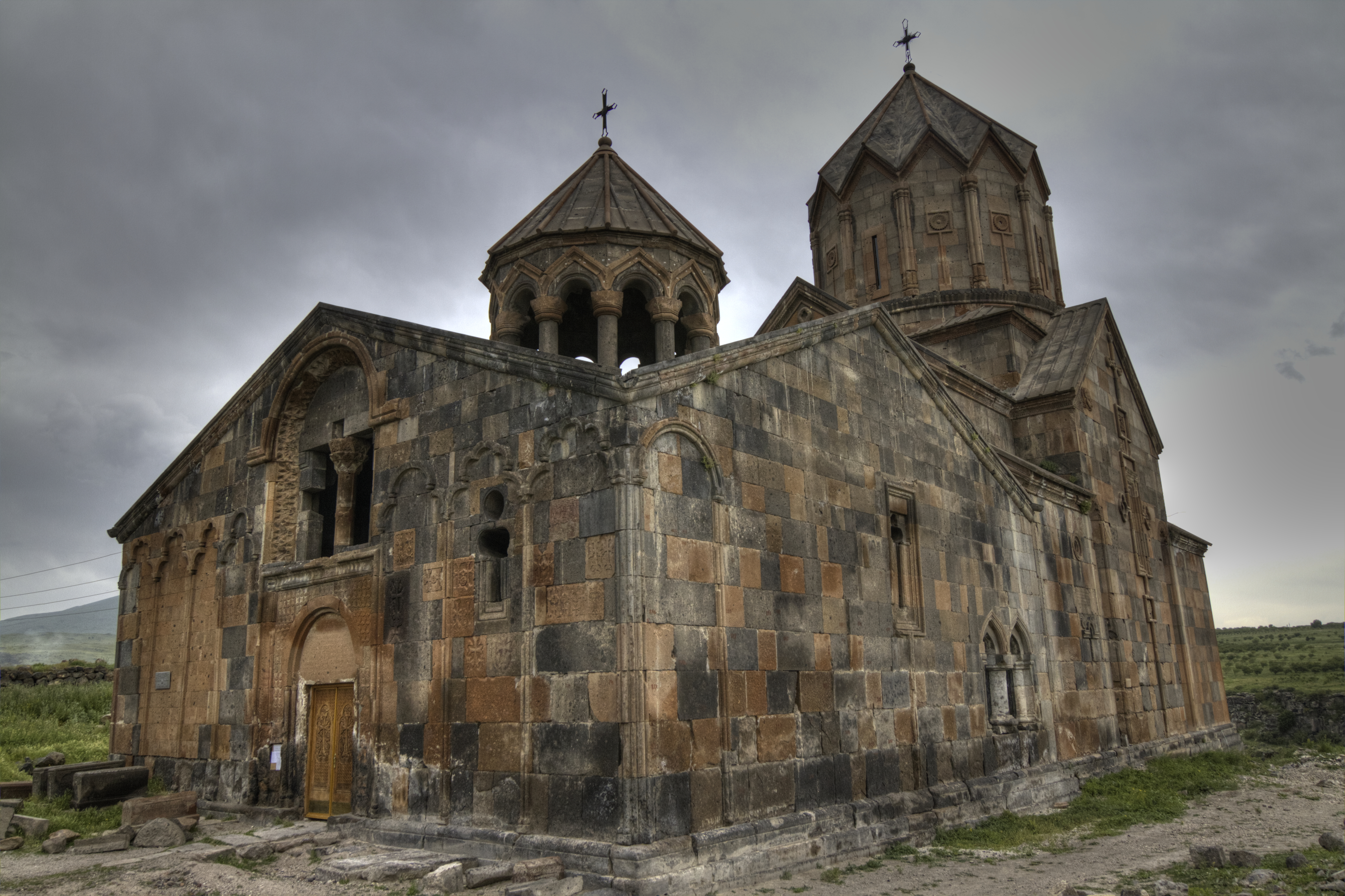
- St. Hovhannes Karapet (St. John the Baptist) Cathedral, Hovhannavank Monastery (1216 and 1221)

- Location within Armenia Location within Aragatsotn

Religion
- Affiliation: Armenian Apostolic Church

Location
- Location: Ohanavan, Aragatsotn, Armenia
- Coordinates: 40.339428°N 44.388653°E

Architecture
- Type: Monastery, Church
- Style: Armenian
- Completed: 1216

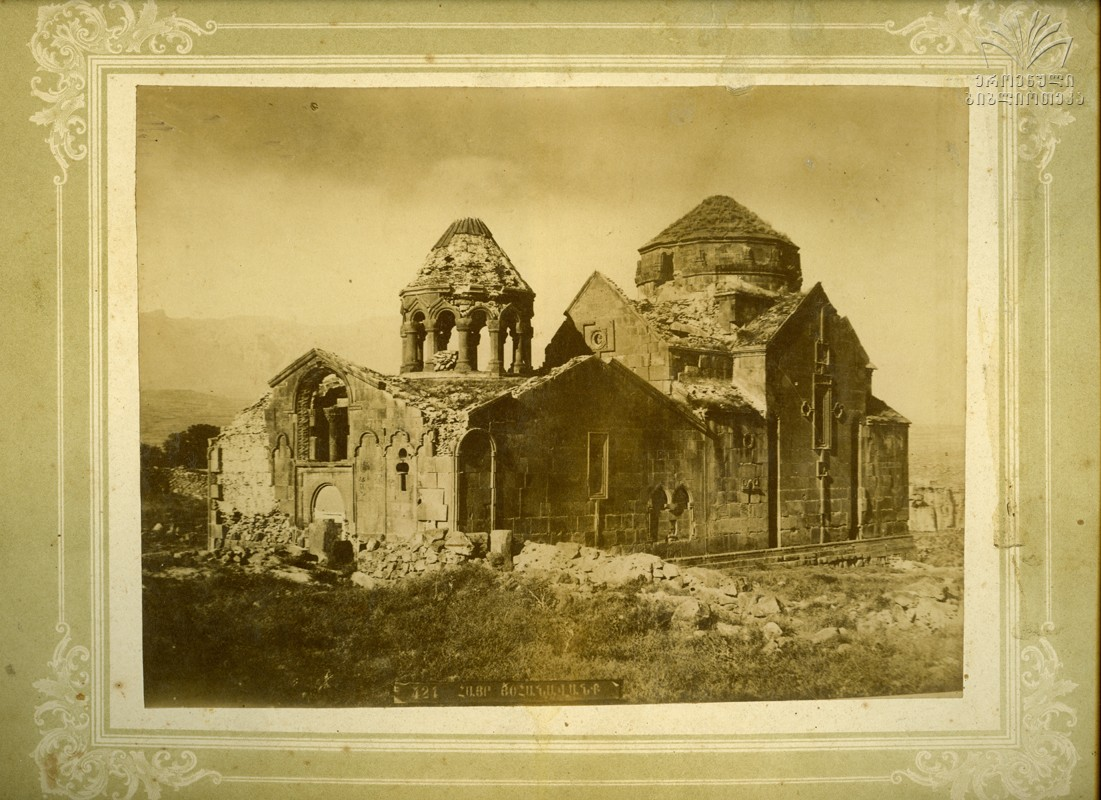
The monastery c. 1900

Hovhannavank, also Yovhannavank‘ (Armenian: Հովհաննավանք) is a medieval monastery located in the village of Ohanavan in the Aragatsotn Province of Armenia. The monastery stands on the edge of the Kasagh River canyon, and its territory is adjacent to the village of Ohanavan. The deep gorge is carved by the Kasagh River.

== History and architecture ==
The oldest part of the monastery is the single nave basilica of St. Karapet (i.e. Holy Forerunner, John the Baptist) that was founded at the beginning of the fourth century by St. Gregory the Enlightener, who baptized Armenia into the world's first Christian nation. The wooden roof of the early church was replaced in 554 AD with a thatch cover, and the basilica itself underwent profound renovation between 1652 and 1734.

The centerpiece of the monastery is the Cathedral built between 1216 and 1221 through the donation of Prince Vache I Vachutian Amberdtsi (Վաչե Ա). The Cathedral has a cruciform floor plan, with two storey sacristies in each of the four extensions of the church. The dome has an umbrella-shaped roof, which is unique to Armenian churches. The Cathedral's important decorations include carved scenes from the Parable of the Wise and Foolish Virgins (Matthew 25:1-13).

In 1250, Vache I's son, Kurt I Vachutian, built a narthex (zhamatun, or gavit) next to the western wall of the Cathedral. The narthex is supported by four base pillars and features a central rotunda (added in 1274) that rests on twelve columns. Between the 12th and 17th centuries, Hovhannavank was known as an important educational and theological center of Eastern Armenia that had a scriptorium where manuscripts were written and illuminated. The monastery was described in details in 1686 by the historian Zakaria Kanakertsi who spent his entire life at Hovhannavank. His contribution is recorded by an inscription:

In the year 699 (ie 1250 CE) … I, K‘urd, son of Vač‘ē, and my spouse Xorišah... put my treasure at the disposal of Armenian churches and for the sake of love of God confirmed again our affiliation to (the Monastery of ) the Holy Precursor and established this great house of glory, bringing it to completion with mighty efforts. And the servants of the saints established that in a year for 20 days there shall be 10 masses (celebrated) for me, K‘urd, and 10 for Xorišah, as long as we live, 10 for Vač‘ē and 10 for Mamk‘an. ASer we pass away, they shall officiate for us starting with New Sunday without any interruption. Whoever refuses to comply shall inherit our sins. Those who perform as it is written here shall be blessed by God. Amen.

— Foundation inscription of Prince K‘urd.

The monastery walls are covered with rich lapidary inscriptions. One large engraved text high on the northern wall of one of the monastery's auxiliary structures was added by Vache Vachutian but written in the words of his suzerains, the Zakarids. It reads:

"...By the grace of merciful God, during the reign of Queen Tamar, daughter of the great Gevorg, in the year 642 (1200 AD) of the race of Torgom, we—brothers Zakaria and Ivane — sons of Sargis the Great, son of Avag Zakarian, when the light of God’s grace rose and entered Armenia and raised us from weakness in the battle against the enemies of Christ and destroyed their power and quenched their violence, with the country of Ararat delivered from the heavy yoke of their servitude, wished to make offering and gave the tribute of the grace to the Holy Forerunner of Hovhannavank ...

Another key inscription was left by Konstandin I, Katholicos of Armenia.

Hovhannavank's Cathedral belongs to the category of “Gandzasar-style” ecclesiastical edifices that were built approximately at the same time in different parts of Armenia, and were endowed with similar compositional and decorative characteristics (another example—Cathedral of the Haritchavank Monastery). Those include umbrella-shaped dome, cruciform floor plan, narthex (often with stalactite-ornamented ceiling), and high-relief of a large cross on one of church's walls. In 1918, the dome and the southern wall were destroyed by a powerful earthquake; both were reconstructed in the 1990s.

== Archaeological Data ==
Research history

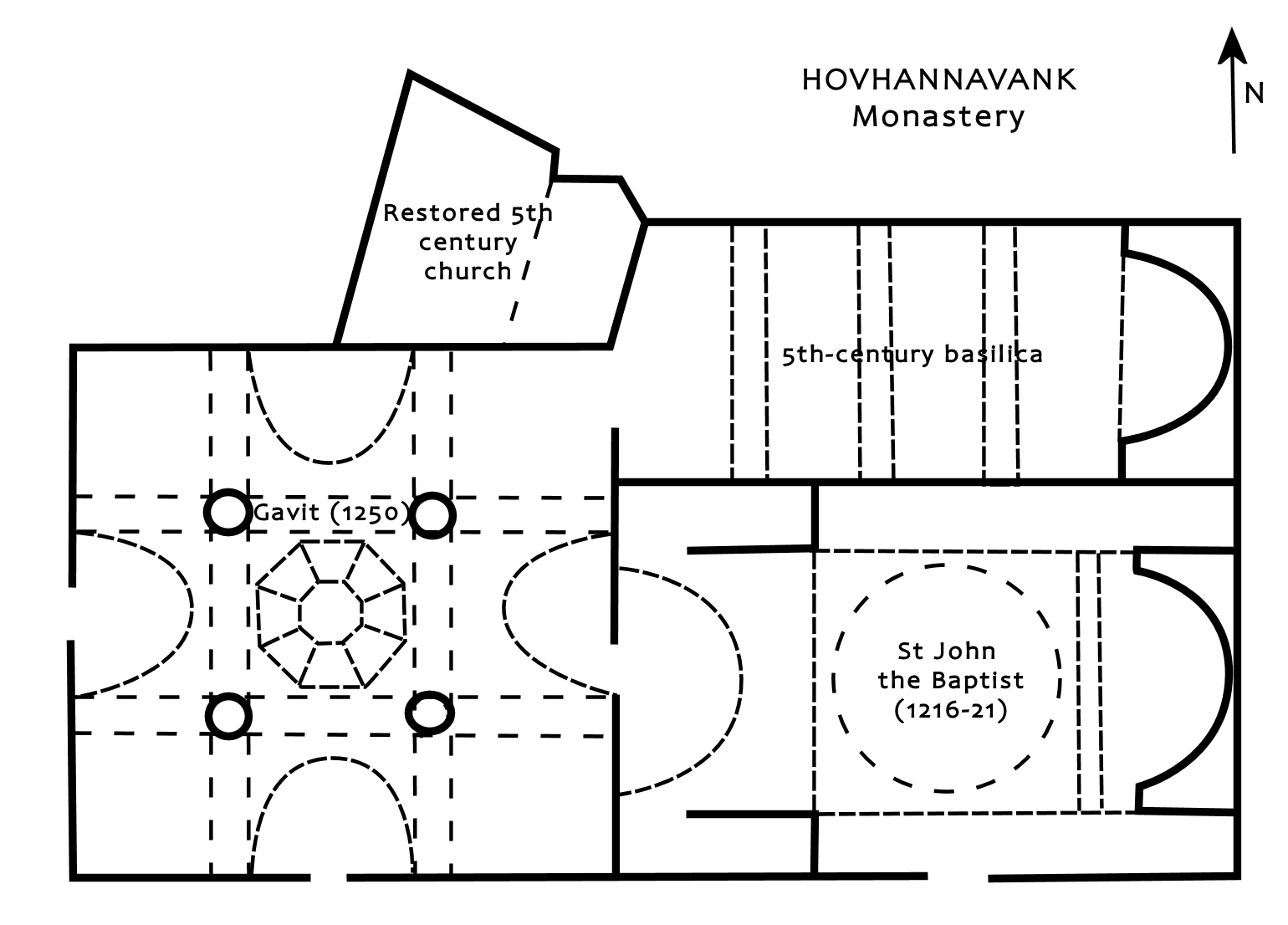
Plan of Hovhannavank Monastery

Zakaria Kanakertsi (historian of the 17th century), H. Shahkhatuniants (topographer, mid-19th century), K.G. Ghafadaryan (archaeologist-historian, first half of the 20th century), H. Khalpakkhyan (architect, last quarter of the 20th century), A. Zhamkochian, N. Hakobyan (archaeologists, 2015)

Archaeological description

Stratigraphy. The monastery is one of the famous spiritual centers of medieval Armenia, which was the center of the diocese of Aragatsotn province. The main buildings of the monastery were built on the site of the monastery founded here by Gregory the Illuminator in the 13th century; only the early medieval basilica church and the monument dated back to 7th century remained half-ruined. According to the legend, the relics of Hovhannes the Baptist are gathered here.

The prospering period of Hovhannavank is connected with the Vachutian princely house; during their reign St. Garabed Kathoghike Church, the courtyard, the other buildings of the monastery were built, it was enclosed, the congregation was expanded, a school and a library were established.

The monastery’s next prospering phase is the 17th century associated with Zakaria Vagharshapatsi’s name who was appointed an abbot in 1637. Due to his efforts the churches are repaired, the cloisters attached to the enclosure, and other economic structures are built. He regulates the library of the monastery, expands the school inherited by Etchmiadzin - the highest in the Ararat province.

As a result of the 1679 earthquake, the structures of the monastery collapsed which caused the monastery to gradually decline and eventually get desolated at the beginning of the 19th century.

The vestibule was renovated by the monument protection committee in 1938, and St. Garabed Kathoghike - in the 1990s (architector H. Gasparyan).

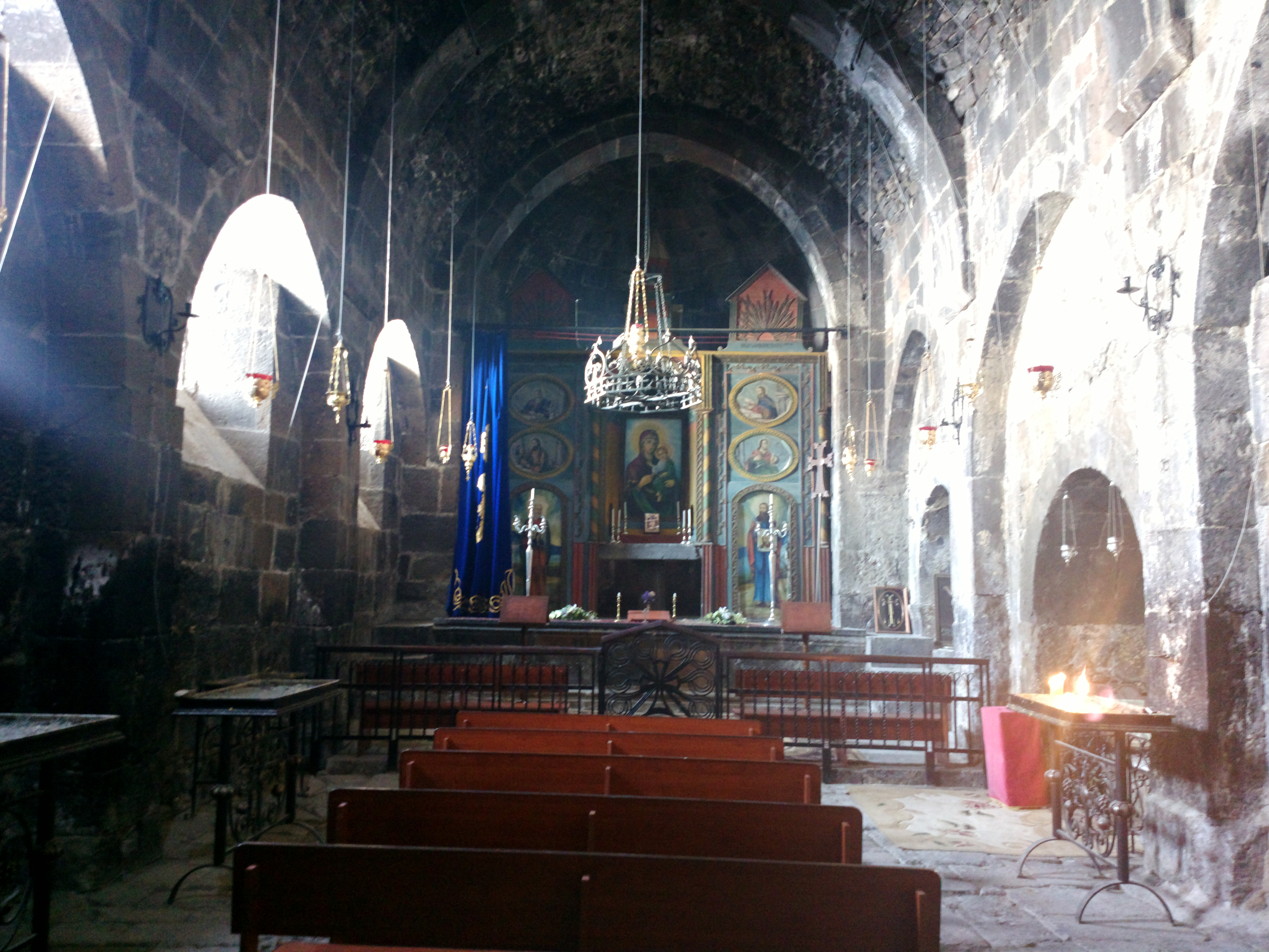
The old single-nave church

Architecture. The complex consists of an early medieval single-nave basilica, St. Garabed main church adjacent to it from the south, a large vestibule, and an annex (tomb) with an irregular plan between the vestibule and basilica. The complex is enclosed. A guest house, a rectory, and a high-class school functioned in the monastery.

The single-nave basilica church founded by Gregory the Illuminator in the 4th century, was originally covered with wood. Being renovated for many times the structure preserved up to date dates back to the half of the 5th century / beginning of the 6th century. Renovations were made in 1652 and 1734, as a result of which the original entrance remained in the southern double wall, and the new southwestern entrance was opened from the vestibule after the construction of the cathedral. On the south side of the basilica church there was a wood-covered vestibule, which was demolished at the beginning of the 13th century during the construction of the Kathoghike. The sculpture representing the Vachutian clan emblem was installed on the eastern facade of the basilica church in the 13th century.

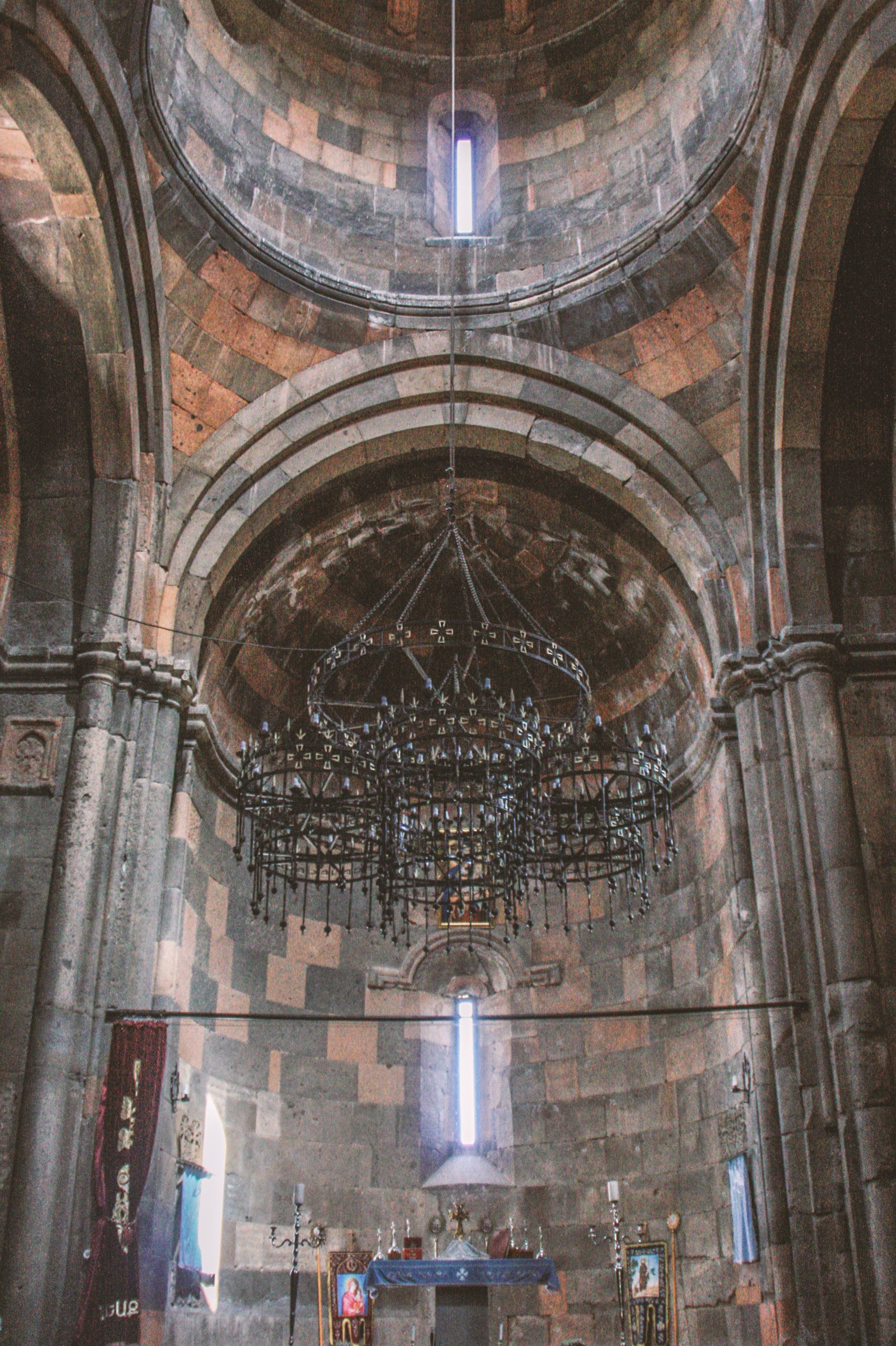
Kathoghike Church, built in 1216-1221 by Vache Vachutyan.

St. Garabed Kathoghike Church was built in 1216-1221 by Vache Vachutyan. It is adjacent to the basilica church from the south. On the outside it is rectangular, while on the inside it is cruciform with two-story vaults at the four corners and stone cantilever steps leading to the second floor of the western vaults. The transition from the domed square to the polygonal drum was made by means of sails (the dome was destroyed in 1918). The eastern and southern walls are externally highlighted between the pair of triangular niches. The entrance to the Kathoghike Church opening into the vestibule, has a luxurious decoration. The parapet is decorated with a row of octagonal medallions with crocheted floral decorations, the fields between them are filled with small sculptures. A unique iconography of the evangelical parable of the "Wise and Foolish Virgins" is carved on the back of the façade completely decorated with plants, where the newly married young congregants are represented instead of girls.

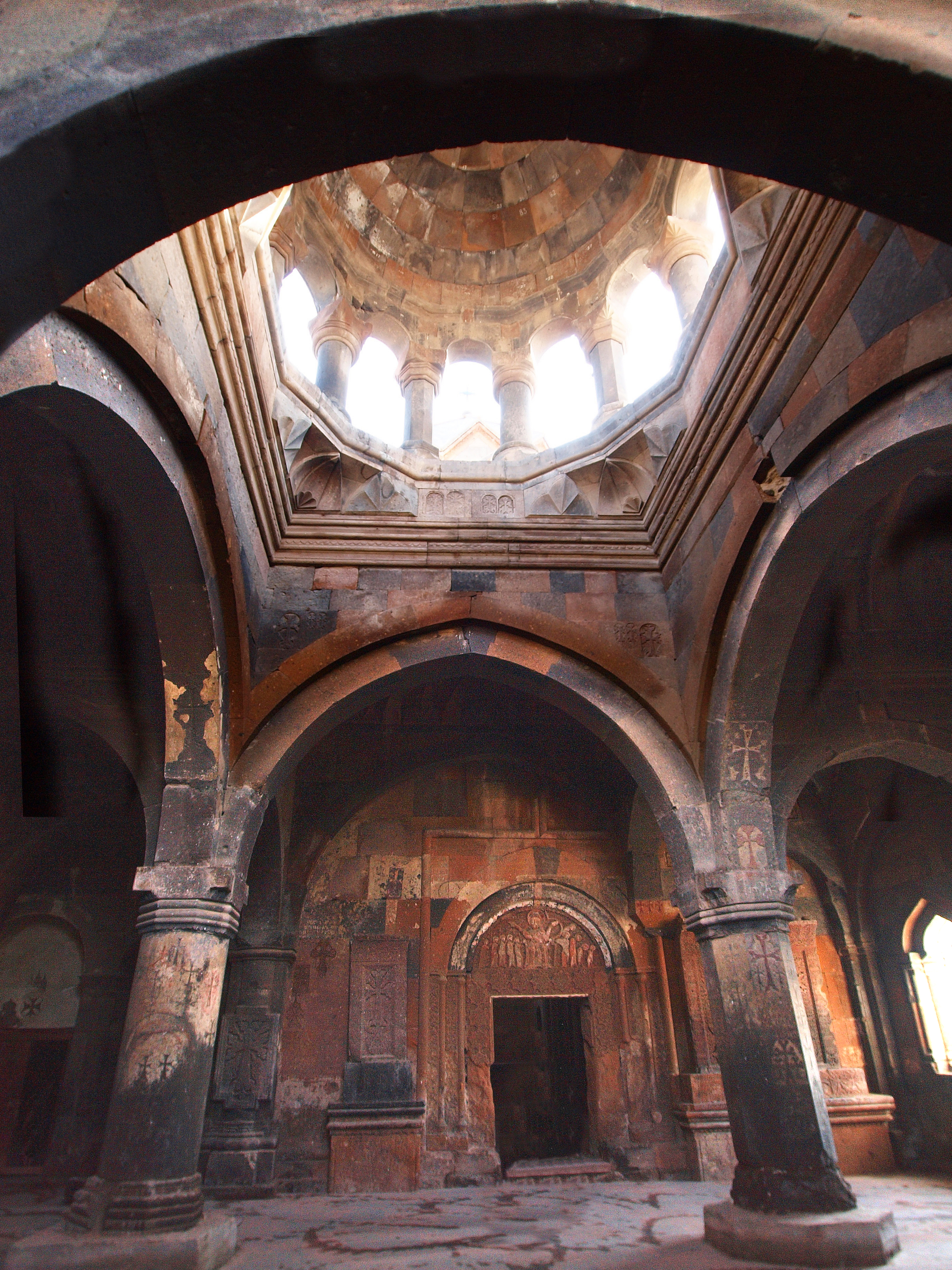
Gavit of Hovhannavank, completed in 1250 by Kurd Vachutian.

Gavit (the vestibule) is adjacent to the Kathoghike and Basilica churches on the west side. The construction was completed in 1250 by Kurd Vachutian. It is a large four-columned central hall, the central opening of which is crowned by a pillared rotunda. The vestibule stands out for its rich interior decoration. The bust of Christ is depicted on one of the ceiling tiles. The rows of three and five arches connecting the columns, externally enliven the west facade of the vestibule. The entrance frame is decorated with sculptures of diagonally shaped crosses. Above the entrance there is a wide mullioned window with a frame decorated with ornamental stones.

The monastery is enclosed on three sides reinforced with semi-circular and rectangular towers. The arched entrance is on the west side. Cloisters adjacent to the enclosure, wells and wine vats on the north side of the basilica church were revealed due to the excavations in 2015. The enclosure was built by Nana (Vaneni), the wife of Kyurikian King Abbas at the end of the 12th century and was thoroughly repaired in the 17th century by Zakaria Vagharshapattsi’s efforts.

Findings

Fragments of cross-stones and architectural details, pottery

Significance

It was the center of the episcopal diocese of Amberd province in the High and Late Middle Ages.

Traditional legends

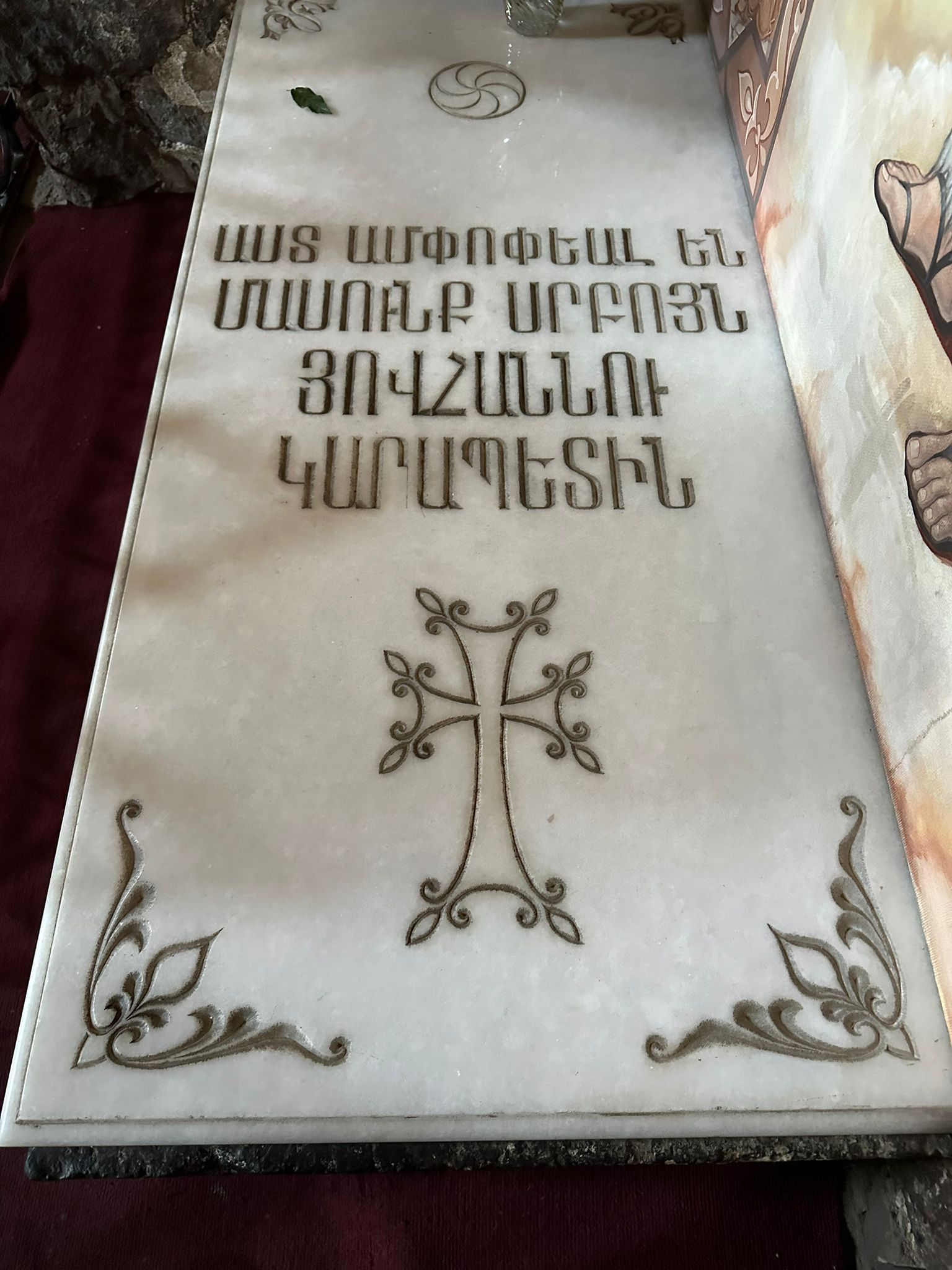
The burial place of the relics of St. John the Baptist.

According to the legend, the monastery was founded by Gregory the Illuminator with pious King Tiridates burying the relics of St. John the Baptist here. Hearing from Z. Kanakertsi A. Davrizhetsi, reports: "When St Illuminator built this, he appointed an overseer named Syughos, and the monastery was named after him, and in translators’ days Gh. Parpetsi was the leader and was writing his own history. He appointed someone named Hovan as an inspector, so it was called Hovannavank. In the days of Nerses the Great lepers and scabies, exhausted by hunger, gathered there, so it was called the Monastery of Hunger."

Sources

- Arakel Davrizhetsi 1988, History (translated and annotated by V. Arakelyan), Yerevan, "Soviet Writer", 592 pages.

- Zakaria Kanakertsi 2013, Historiography (translated and annotated by V. Arakelyan), Yerevan, "Hayastan", 272 pages.

- Zhamkochian A., Hakobyan N. 2016, Results of the western wall excavations of the Hovhannavank, Etchmiadzin, B, 110-126.

- Ghafadaryan K. 1948, Hovhannavank and its inscriptions, Yerevan, Academy of Sciences USSR ed., 123 pages.

== Bibliography ==
- Zakaria Kanakertsi (1627-1699). Chronicle. Moscow, 1969
- Murat Hasratyan and Zaven Sargsyan. Հայաստան Քրիստոնեական Ճարտարապետության 1700 տարին / Armenia: 1700 Years of Christian Architecture. Moughni Publishers, Yerevan, 2001
- Tom Masters and Richard Plunkett. Georgia, Armenia & Azerbaijan, Lonely Planet Publications; 2 edition (July 2004)
- Nicholas Holding. Armenia with Nagorno Karabagh, Bradt Travel Guides; Second edition (October, 2006)

== See also ==
- Gandzasar, an architecturally similar monastery in Artsakh
- Saghmosavank, a nearby monastery
