= Astvatsankal Monastery =

Armenian Monastery complex in Aragatsotn Province

Coordinates: 40°27′47″N 44°26′37″E

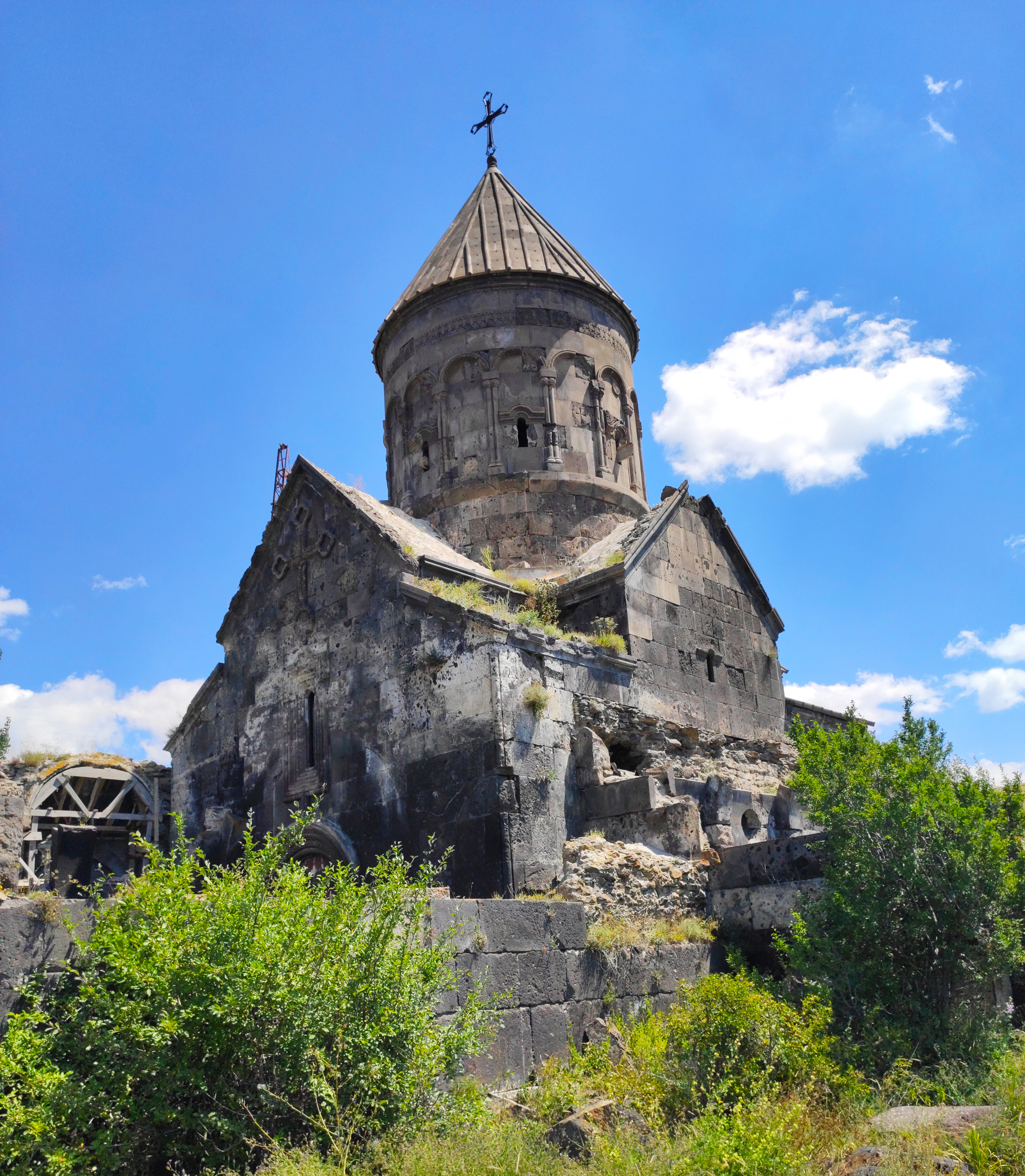
Astvatsankal Monastery

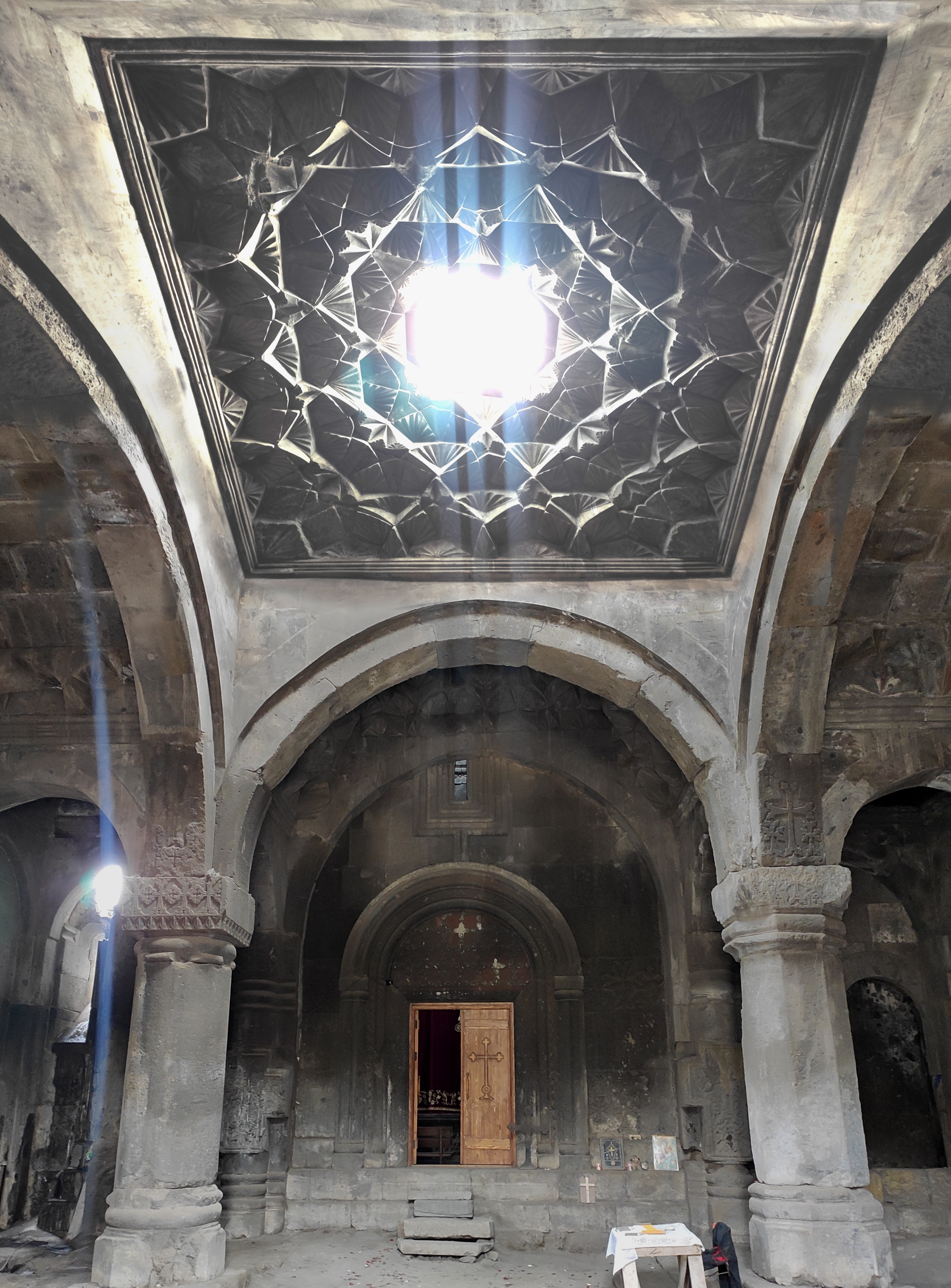
The gavit and its vault with muqarnas design, with a central erdik or oculus, which may have been covered by a colonnaded canopy.

The Astvatsankal Monastery is an Armenian Monastery complex in Aragatsotn Province, between the villages of Yernjatap and Hartavan. It was built in the 4th-13th centuries.

The original chapel of the church was built in the 5th or 6th century.

The main church was added to the chapel in 1244 under the commission of Prince K'urd of the Vachutian dynasty and his wife Xorisali, as known from an inscription:

By the grace and mercy of God, I Kurd, Prince of Princes, son of the great Vache, and my wife Khorishah, daughter of Marzpan, built the Holy Katoghike for the memory of our souls. We have decorated it with every kind of precious ornament and offered the garden bought by us in Parpi, virgin land in Oshakan, a garden in Karbi, a villager (?), and three hostels, in the year 693/AD 1244.

A large gavit or narthex was built right after, circa 1250.

This is one of the famous examples of Armenian architecture in the 13th century adopting the use of muqarnas designs, spurred by the influence of contemporary Islamic architecture. Examples of this can be found in the Geghard Monastery, the Gandzasar Monastery as well (all in present-day Armenia), and at the Church of St Gregory of the Illuminator in Ani. In many of these examples, muqarnas vaults are recurring features in the gavits (narthexes) of the churches, which were the locus of much innovation and experimentation in medieval Armenian architecture. These borrowings of Islamic architectural motifs may have been due to either Ilkhanid or Seljuk influences in the region, although the wide geographic spread of muqarnas usage in this period makes it difficult to pinpoint any specific influence with certainty.

The gavit collapsed in the 1988 Armenian earthquake, but has since been reconstructed.
