= Vachutians =

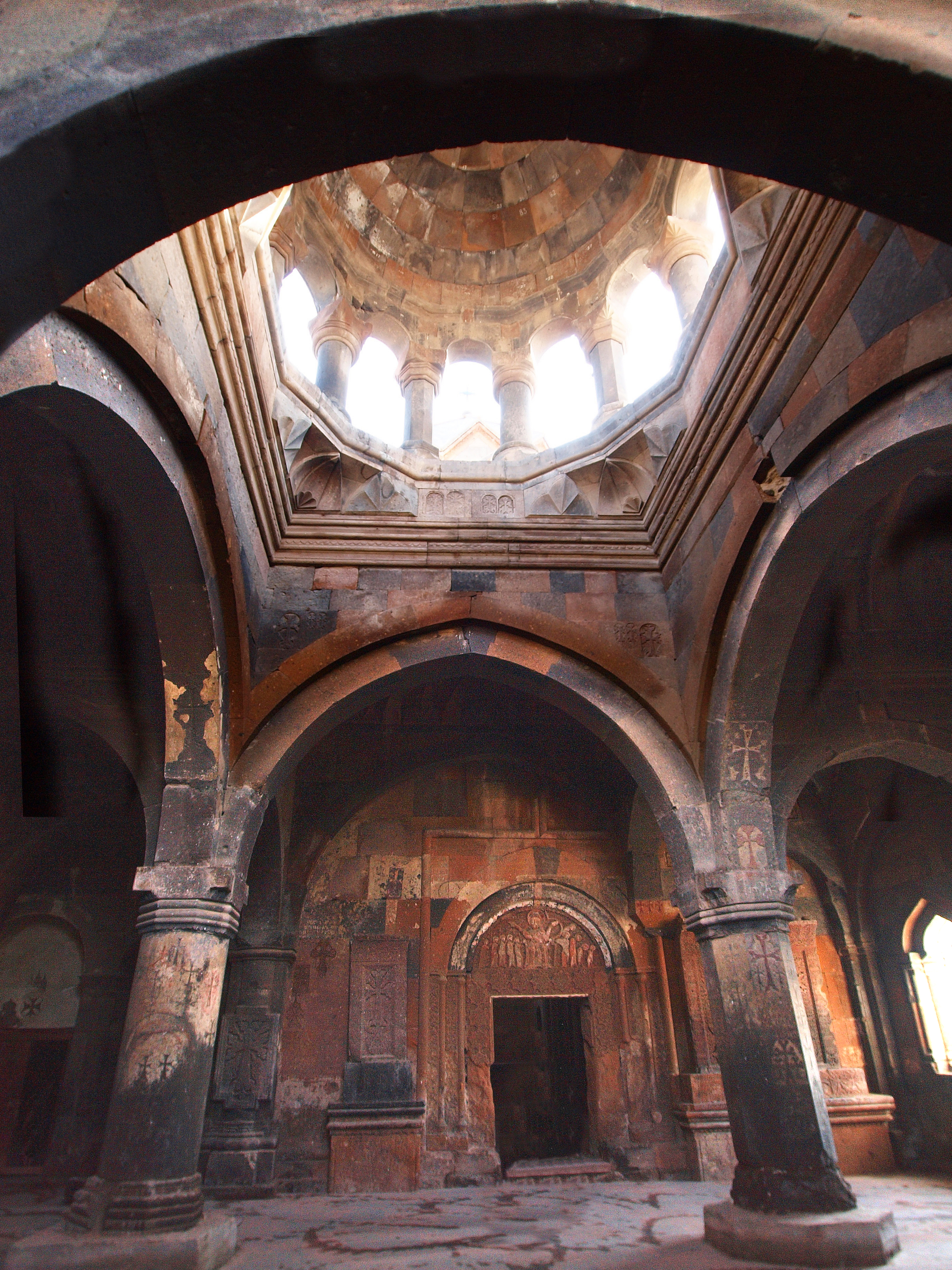
The zhamatun of Hovhannavank was built by Kurt I Vachutian in 1250.

Vachutian dynasty (in Armenian Վաչուտյան տուն or Վաչուտյաններ) was an Armenian noble feudal family headed by a line of princes with the title "Prince of Princes" (in Armenian Իշխանաց իշխան pronounced Ishkhanats Ishkhan), that ruled as a suzerainty in part of Medieval Armenia from around 1206 AD to 1350 AD in the Ayraradian area and Aragatsotn Aparan (present day Aragatsotn Province in Armenia).

The Vachutian dynasty was founded by Vache I Amberdtsi (also known as Vachutyan) in the beginning of the thirteenth century as one of the ruling families of the semi-independent Zakarid Armenia (1201–1335), as Zakare II Zakarian and Ivane I Zakarian had reorganized Armenia into several provinces each ruled by a feudal prince, amongst them the descendants of Vachut.

Throughout their rule, the Vachutians kept close family relations through marriages with other Armenian feudal princes like the Zakarids (Զաքարյաններ) the latter keeping the title of king in Zakarid Armenia after the collapse of the Bagratuni dynasty. Vachutians also kept close relation with the Hamazapyan-Mamikonian family (Համազասպյան-Մամիկոնյան), Ukanantz (Ուքանանց) and other feudal families.

== Capitals and religious seats ==
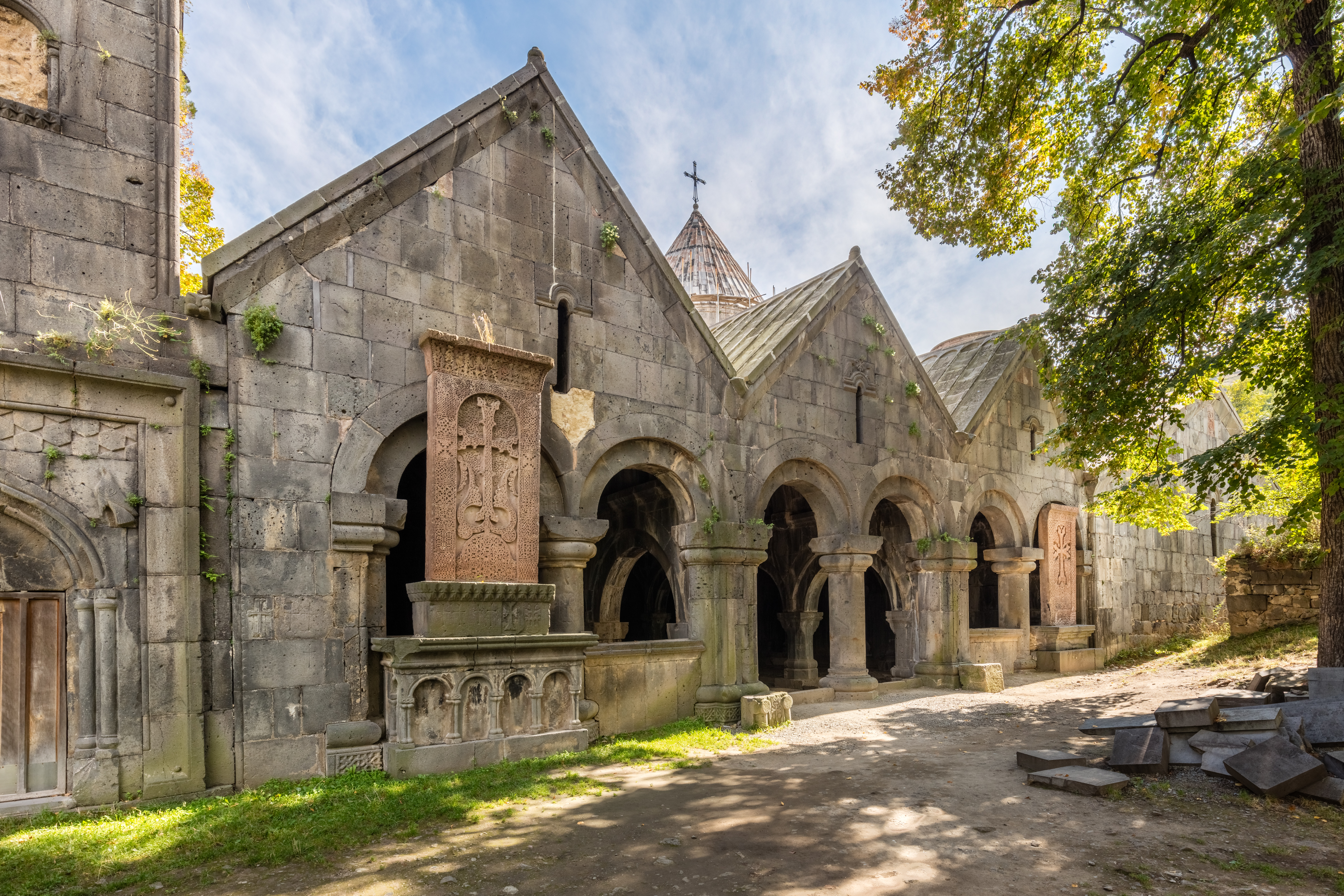
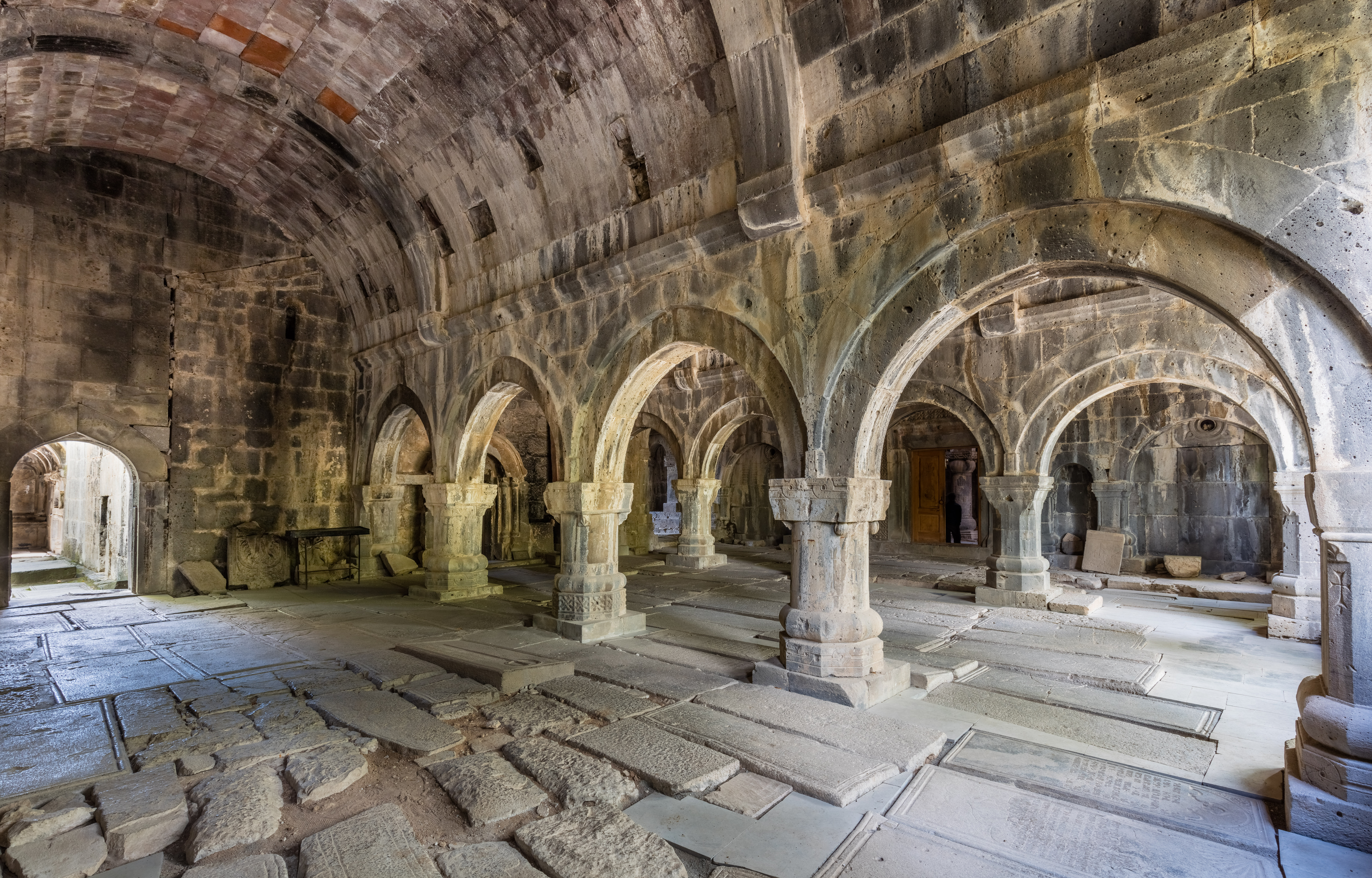
The vestibule (gavit) of St. Astvatsatsin Church in the Sanahin Monastery was built in 1211 by the order of Prince Vache Vachutyan, as evidenced by an inscription.

The main seat of the Vachutians was at Amberd and the religious centers of Hovhannavank Monastery, Saghmosavank Monastery and Astvatsankal Monastery that they generously financed, repaired and rebuilt. After the capital fortress of Amberd was partially destroyed by the invading Mongols in 1236, Kurd I that followed to reign after his father Vache I moved the capital to Vardenis, Aragatsotn building a fortified castle. Historians of the time recounted that Kurt I invited Hethum I), king of the Armenian Kingdom of Cilicia to Vardenis. Kurt I's sons Hassan and Davit II moved the capital to Karbi's fortress. Kurt II and his son Theoedos who was the last ruling prince of the dynasty reestablished Amberd as the dynasty's capital in the 1300s, after repairing it from destruction.

== End of the dynasty ==
The dynasty was destroyed and terminated around 1350 AD by Chupanid ruler of Northern Iran Malek Ashraf, who destroyed the Zakarid dynasty and almost all the other Armenian principalities of the time as well.

== Princes of the Vachutian dynasty ==
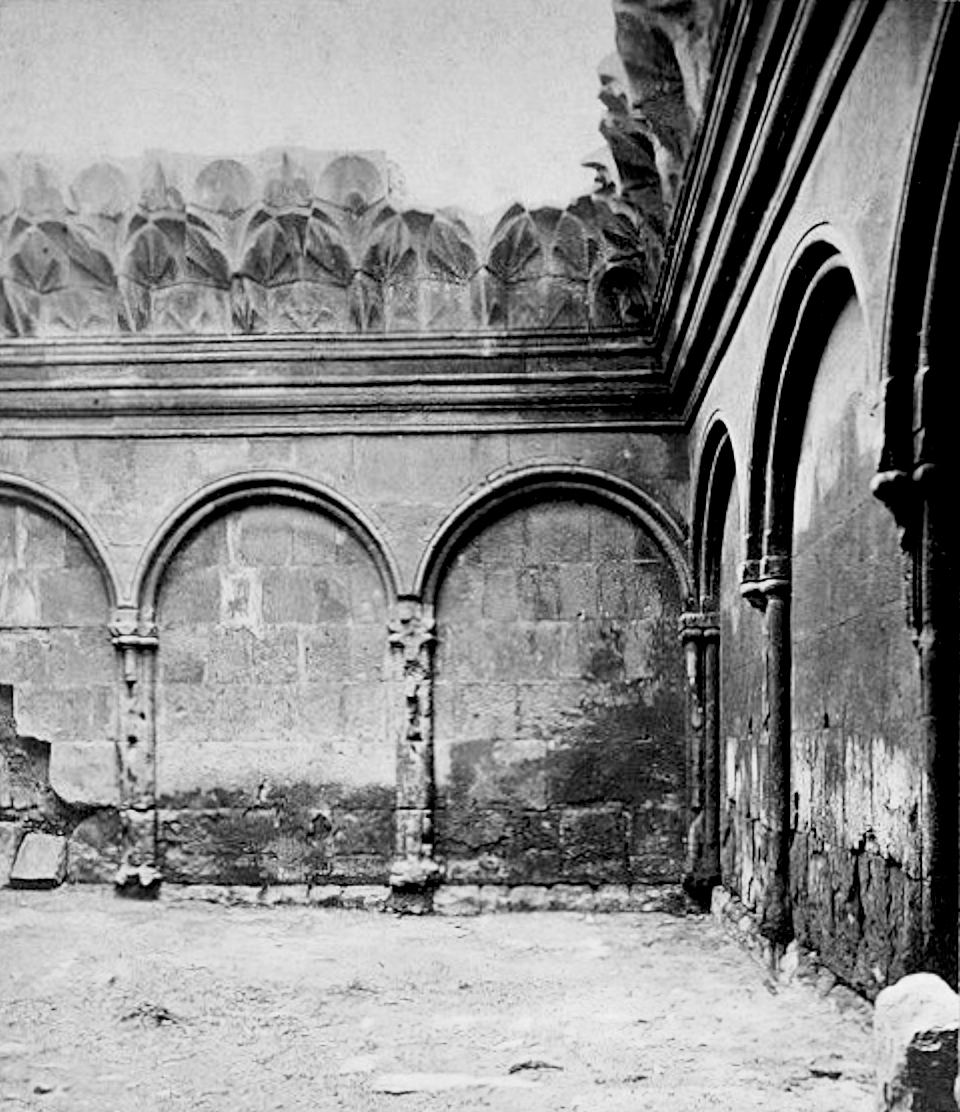
Mausoleum of Prince Vache Vacutian, built in 1229 in Horomos Monastery.

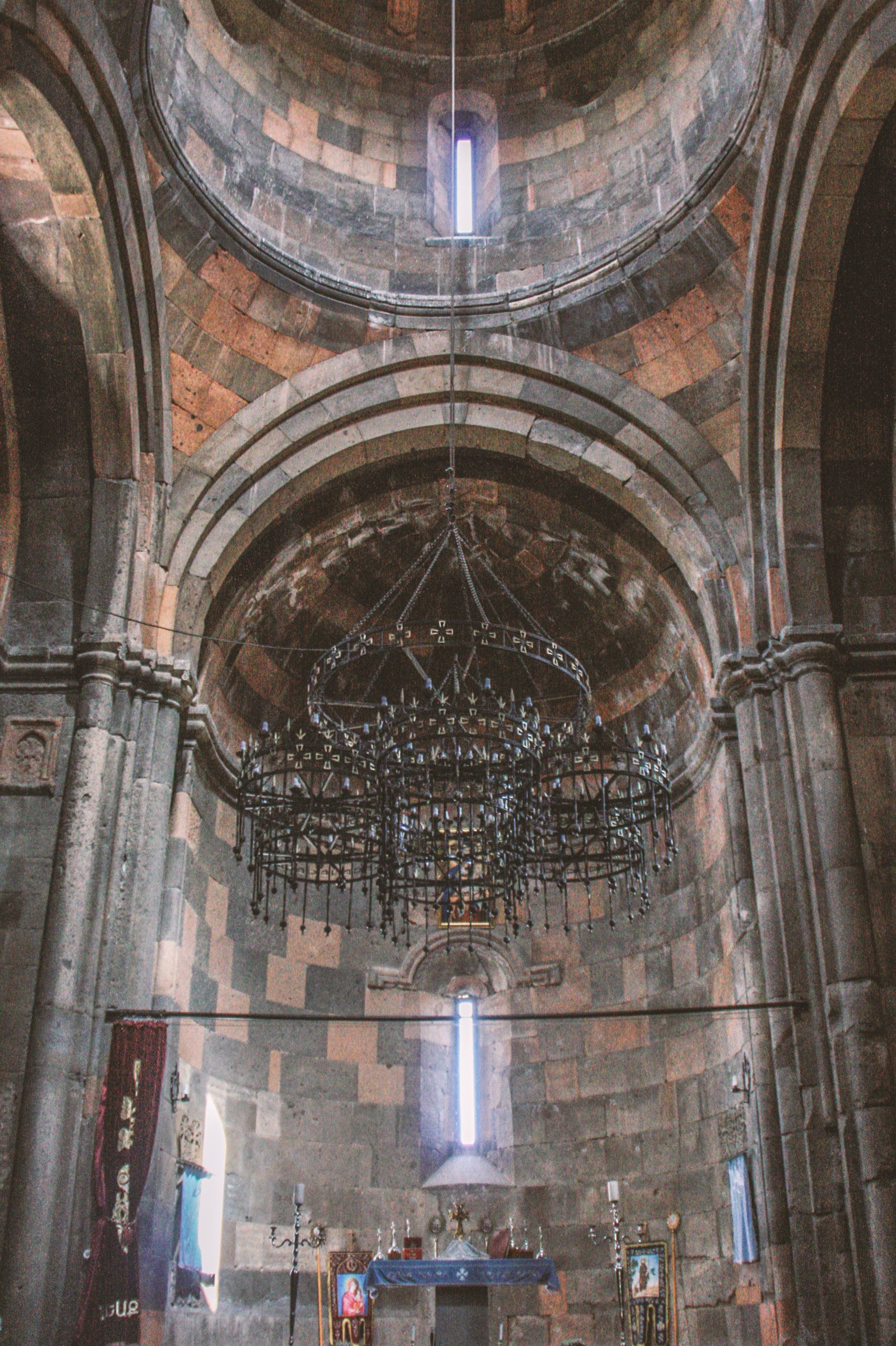
St. Garabed Kathoghike Church of Hovhannavank, built in 1216–1221 by Vache Vachutyan.

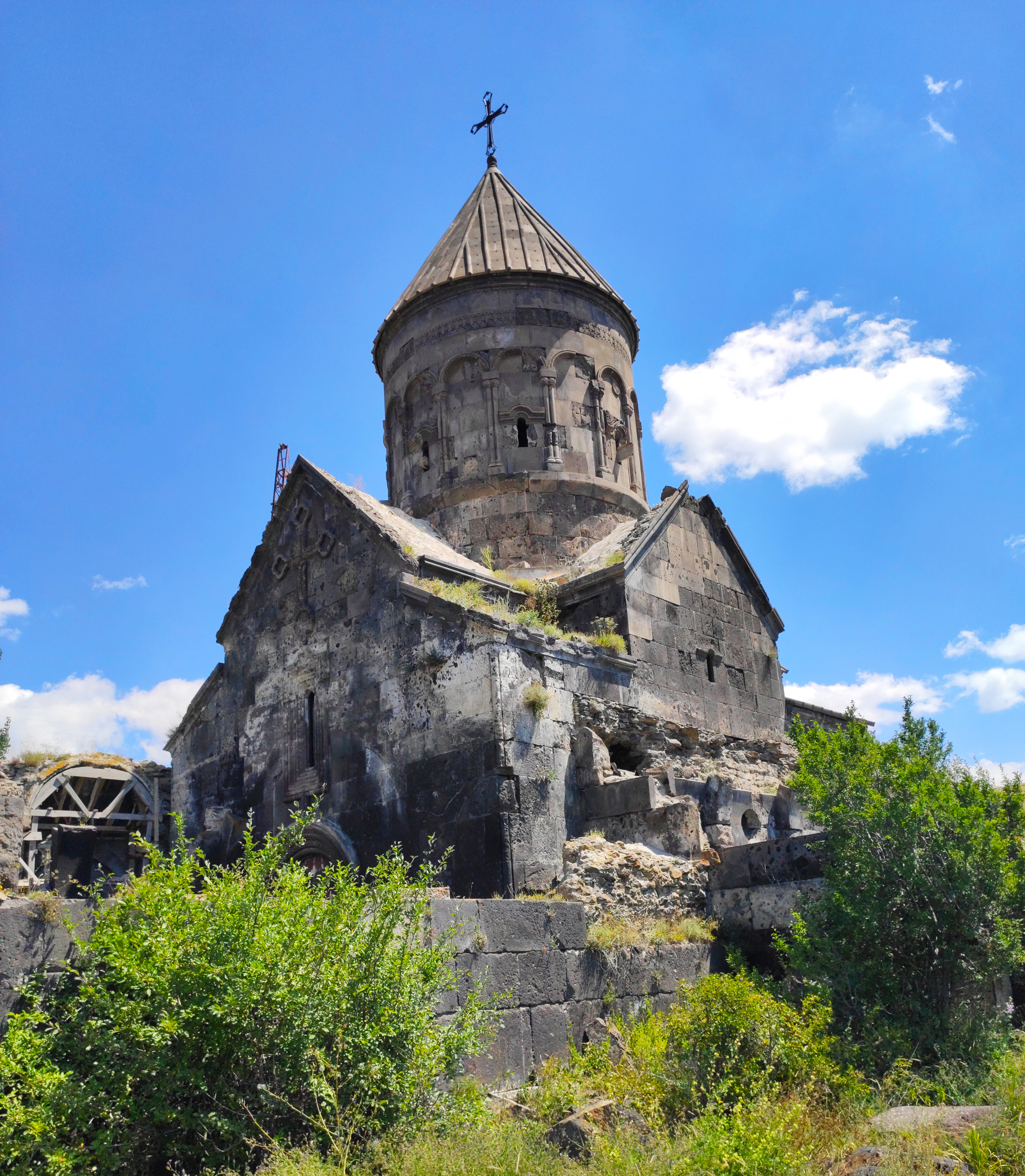
Astvatsankal Monastery was completed by Prince K'urd in 1244

- 1206-1230 - Vache I (known as Amberdtsi) (Վաչե Ա. Ամբերդեցի) Vachutyan, son of Sargis, grandson of Vachut I through whose name the dynasty was named. Prince Vache the first ruling prince of the Vachutian principality was married to Mamakhatun, daughter of Hassan. (See hy) He built the Hovhannavank Monastery.
- 1230-1240 - Kurd I (Քուրդ Ա. Ամբերդեցի), son of Vache I, was married to Khorishah, daughter of Prince Mamikonyan-Hamazapyan Mardzpan. It was a turbulent time as the Mongolian invaded the area and destroyed Amberd's fortifications. (See hy)
  - Vachut II (Վաչուտ Բ), concurrently, Kurd I's brother, called Vachut II as Vachut I was reserved to the founding father of the family, the grandfather of Vache I.
- 1240-1329 (precise dates unclear)
  - around 1240 - Davit I (Դավիթ Ա.)
  - around 1240-1254 - Vache II (Վաչե Բ.)
  - Hassan (Հասան), son of Kurt I
  - Mamakhatun (Մամախաթուն)
  - Davit II (Դավիթ Բ.), son of Kurt I
  - Mamkan (Մամքան)
  - Dayir (Տայիր)
  - Vache III (Վաչե Գ.)
  - Davit III (Դավիթ Գ.)
- 1329-1338 - Kurd II (Քուրդ Բ. Ամբերդեցի), son of Dayir, married to Khuand Khatun, daughter of Amirbek of the Zakaryan dynasty (See hy)
- 1338-1350 - Theoedos (Թեոյդոս Ամբերդեցի) (known as Theoedos Amberdtsi), the last ruler of the dynasty (See hy)

== Notes ==
Note: Vachutians' founding prince Vache I Amberdtsi who ruled in the thirteenth century should not be confused with Vache I of Iberia who ruled in what is known today as Georgia north of Armenia in the 3rd century, nor with Vache I of Albania who ruled in what is known today as Azerbaijan to the west of Armenia in the third century.

== Sources ==
- Text is a translation based on the Armenian Wikipedia article hy:Վաչուտյաններ
- Tigran Petrosyants, Vachutians (Վաչուտյաններ), Yerevan, 2001, 364 էջ։
