= Gavit =

Vestibular feature of Mediaeval Armenian monastic architecture

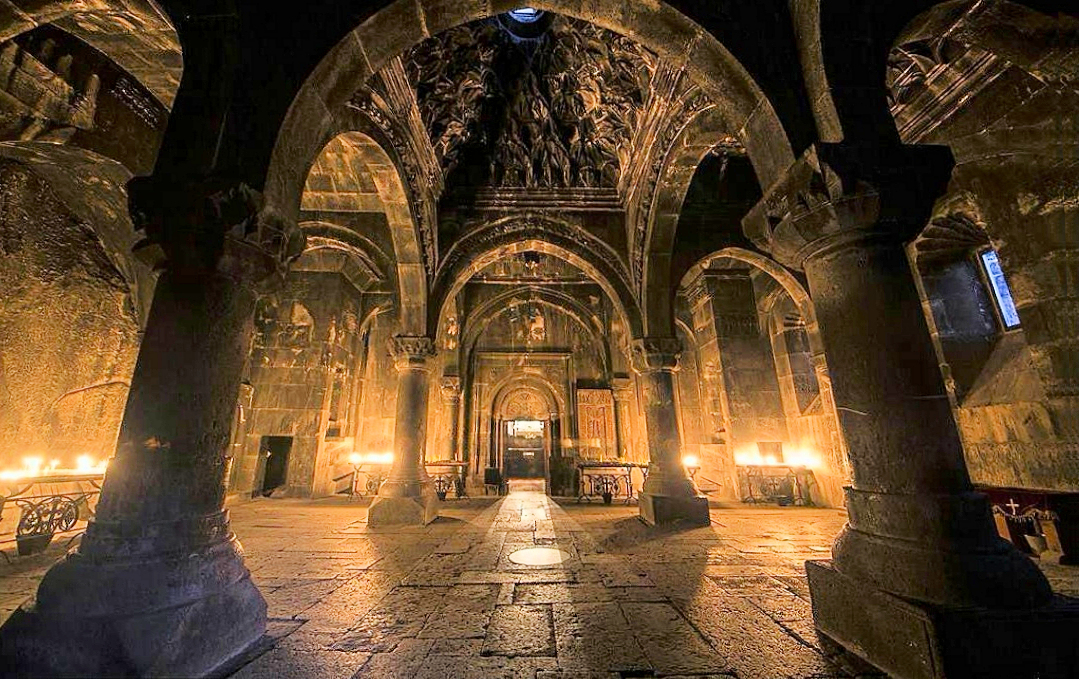
Gavit of Geghard Monastery in Armenia, a UNESCO World Heritage Site. Dated 1215–1225, it has a muqarnas vault at the center.

In a medieval Armenian monastery, a gavit (Armenian: գավիթ; gawit’) or zhamatun (Armenian: ժամատուն; žamatun) is a congressional room or mausoleum added to the entrance of a church, and therefore often contiguous to its west side. It served as narthex (entrance to the church), mausoleum and assembly room, somewhat like the narthex or lite of a Byzantine church. As an architectural element, the gavit was distinct from the church, and built afterwards. Its first known instance is at the Horomos Monastery, dated to 1038, when it was already called "žamatun". The term "gavit" started to replace the term zhamatun' from 1181, when it first appears in an inscription at the Sanahin Monastery.

== History ==
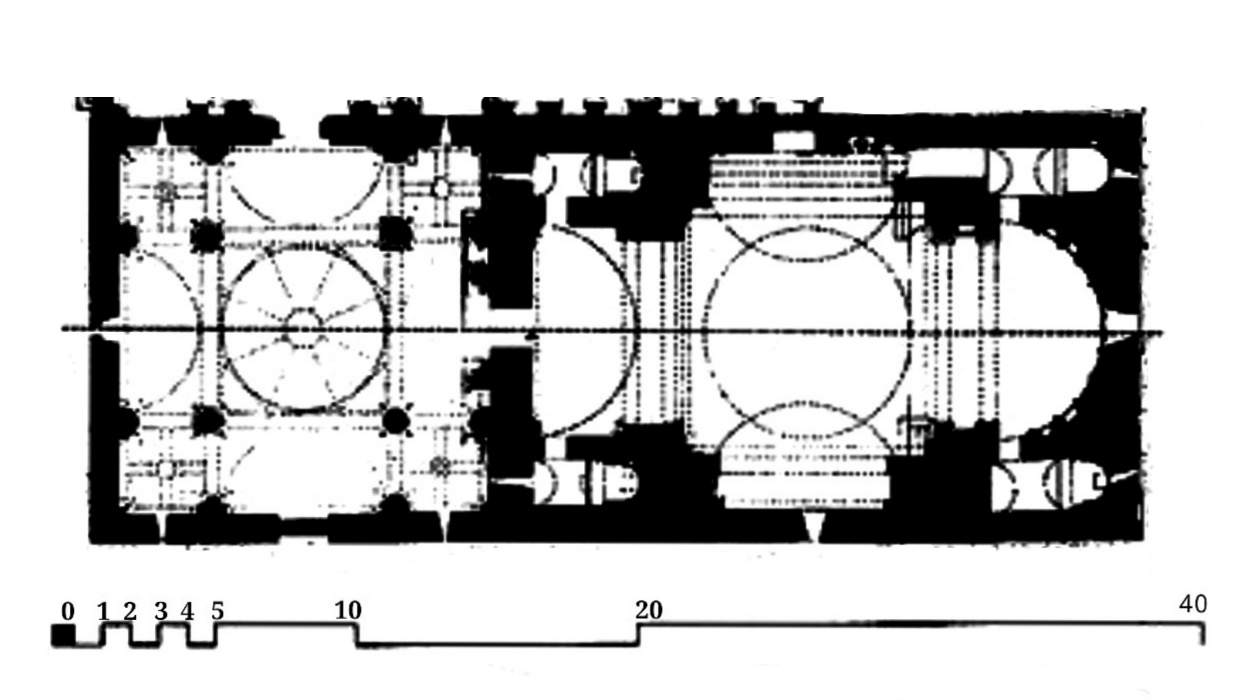
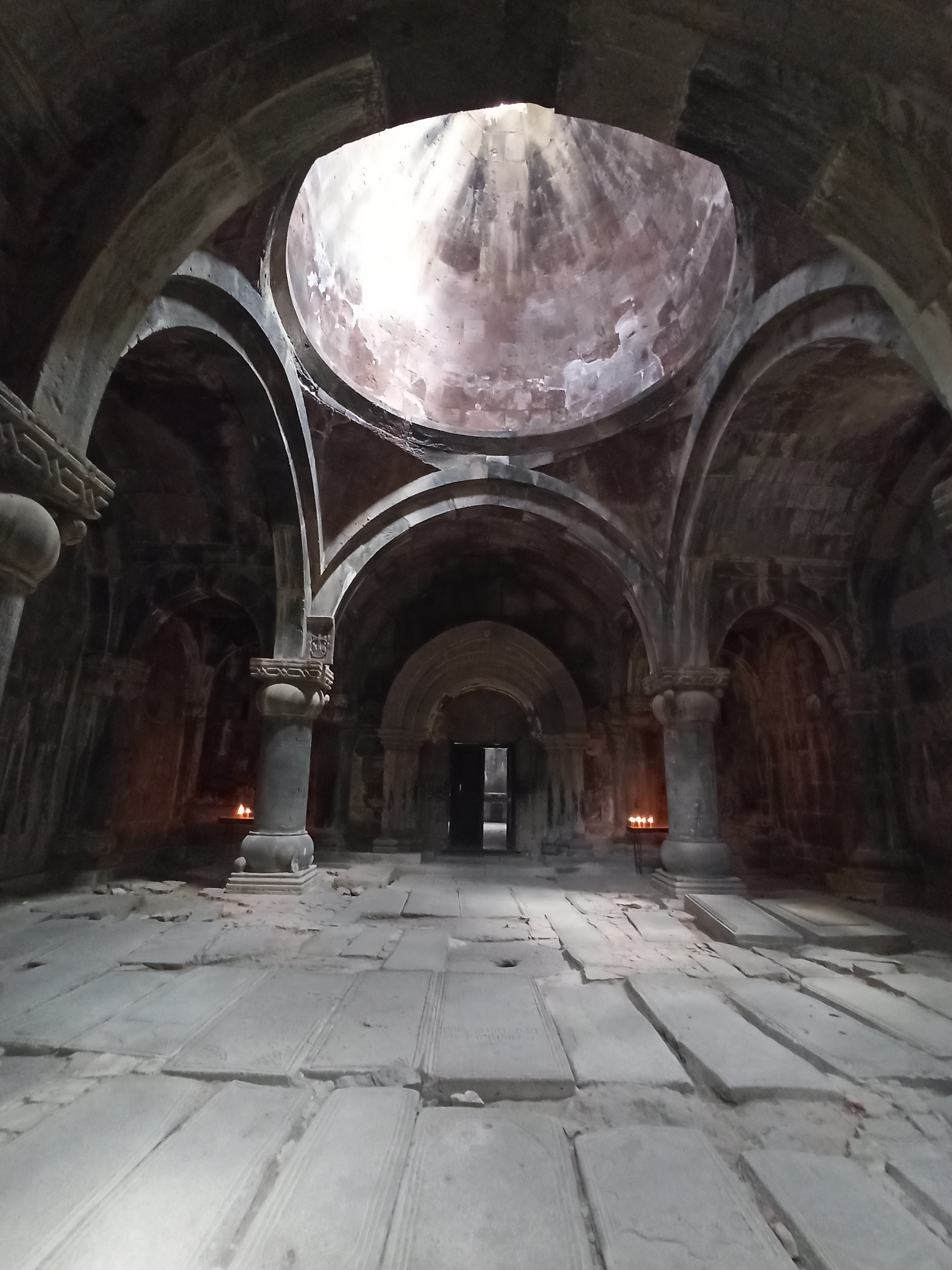
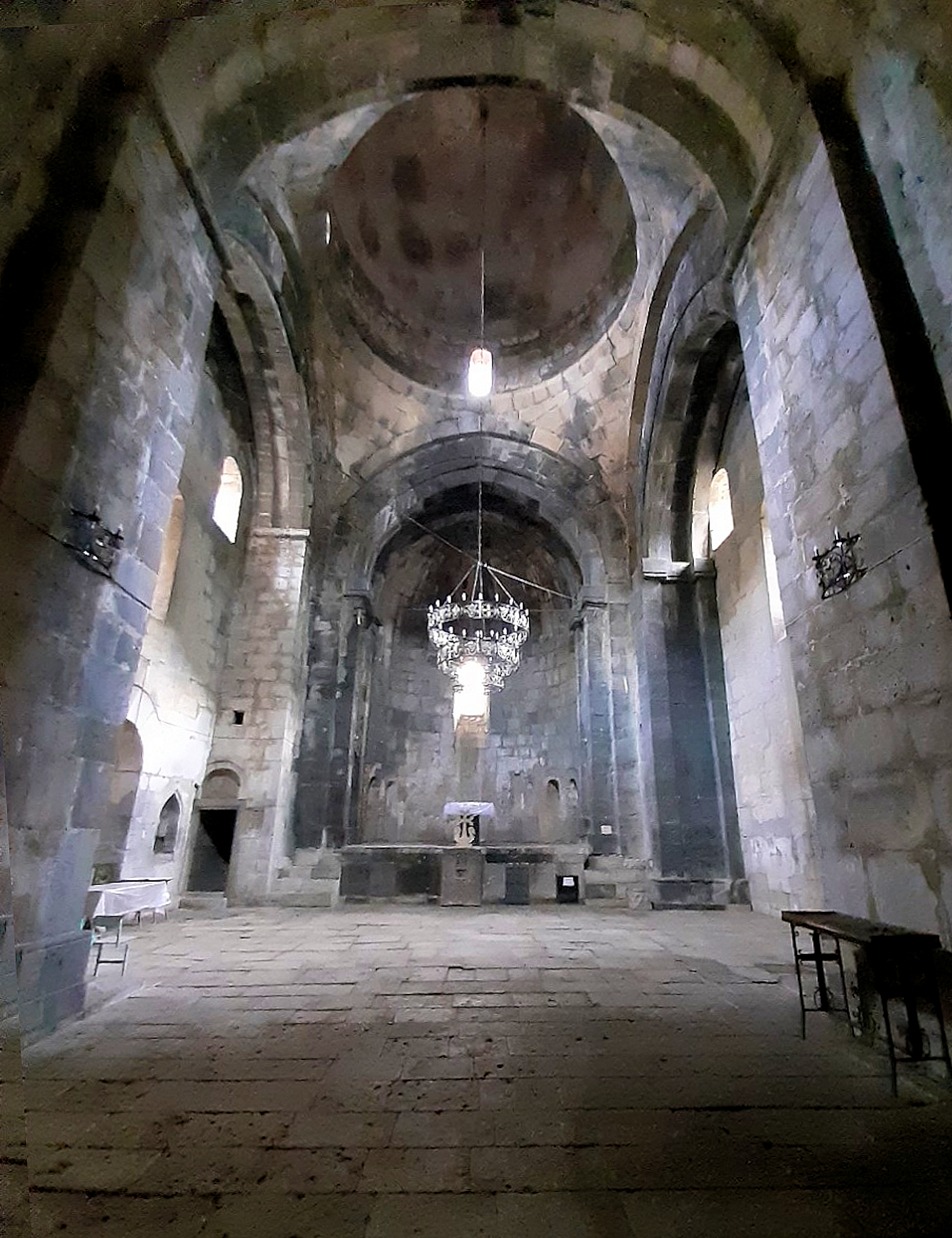
The gavit of the Church of St. Amenaprkitch (left, built 1181) and the church itself, to which it is adjoined (right, built in 966), with corresponding plan. Sanahin Monastery.

The gavit, the distinctive Armenian style of narthex, appeared in the tenth and eleventh centuries. The first structures in the 10th century were simple quadrangular buildings without columns and protected by wooden roofs, used as dynastic necropoleis. From the 11th century, the first known zhamatun with a four-columned structure appears in Hoṙomos Monastery, built in 1038 by King Yovhannēs-Smbat. The vault was in the shape of an octagonal cone, and was decorated with superb reliefs.

Many of the first zhamatun or gavits were located in the south of the Armenia in the region of Syunik. The type of construction changed during the twelfth and fourteenth centuries, as found in the monasteries of Saghmosavank of Haritchavank, or Hovhannavank Monastery. They changed again in the late thirteenth century as can be seen in monasteries such as Gandzasar, and gradually ceased to be built in the late Middle Ages.

The general structure of the gavit, with its nine-bayed plan is typical of the nine-bayed plan of mosques from the Abbasid period onward, which can be seen from Spain to Central Asia.

The first mention of a "žamatun" appears in the 1038 dedicatory inscription of Horomos Monastery, which also is the oldest known "žamatun", built in 1038:

In the year of the Armenians 487 (ie 1038), I, the šahanšah Yovannēs, son of the šahanšah Gagik, gave my vineyard located in Kołb to this church of mine, Surb-Yovannēs, which I have built in this monastery of Hoṙomos, along with this žamatun...

— Dedicatory inscription of the gavit at Horomos.

The mention of the term gavit for such buildings appears for the first time more than a century later in 1181 in the dedicatory inscription at the Sanahin Monastery by Abbot Yovhannēs:

In the year 630 (ie 1181 CE), at the time of the victorious king Georg, and amirspasalar Sargis and his sons Zak‘arē and Iwanē, and amira K‘urd, I, Yovannēs, Abbot of the holy monastery (re)built this once existing church and a gawit‘ from its foundations, with the help of amir K‘urd and the great vardapet Grigor and Christ God, with great hope...

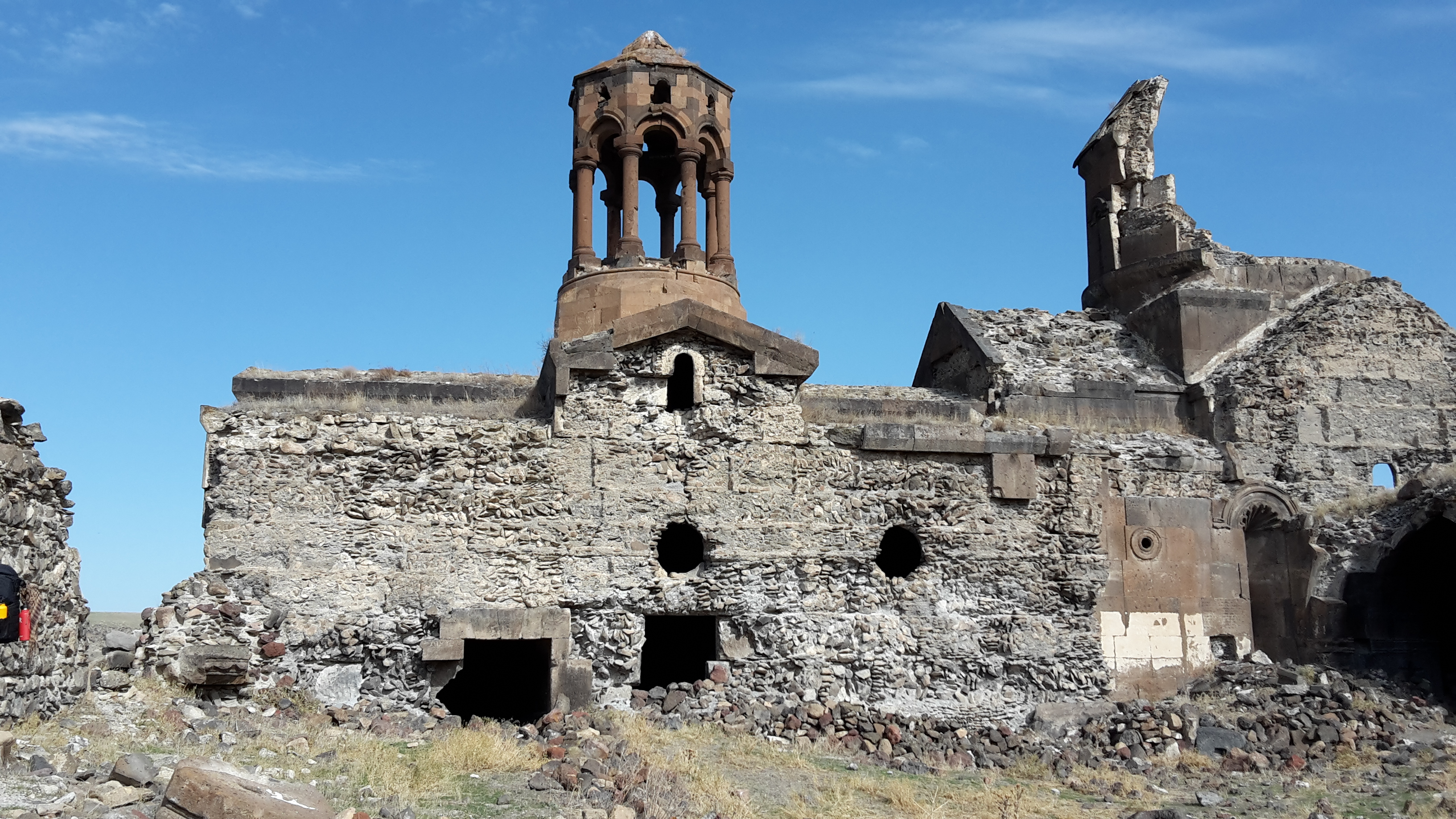
Zhamatun of Horomos Monastery, 1038

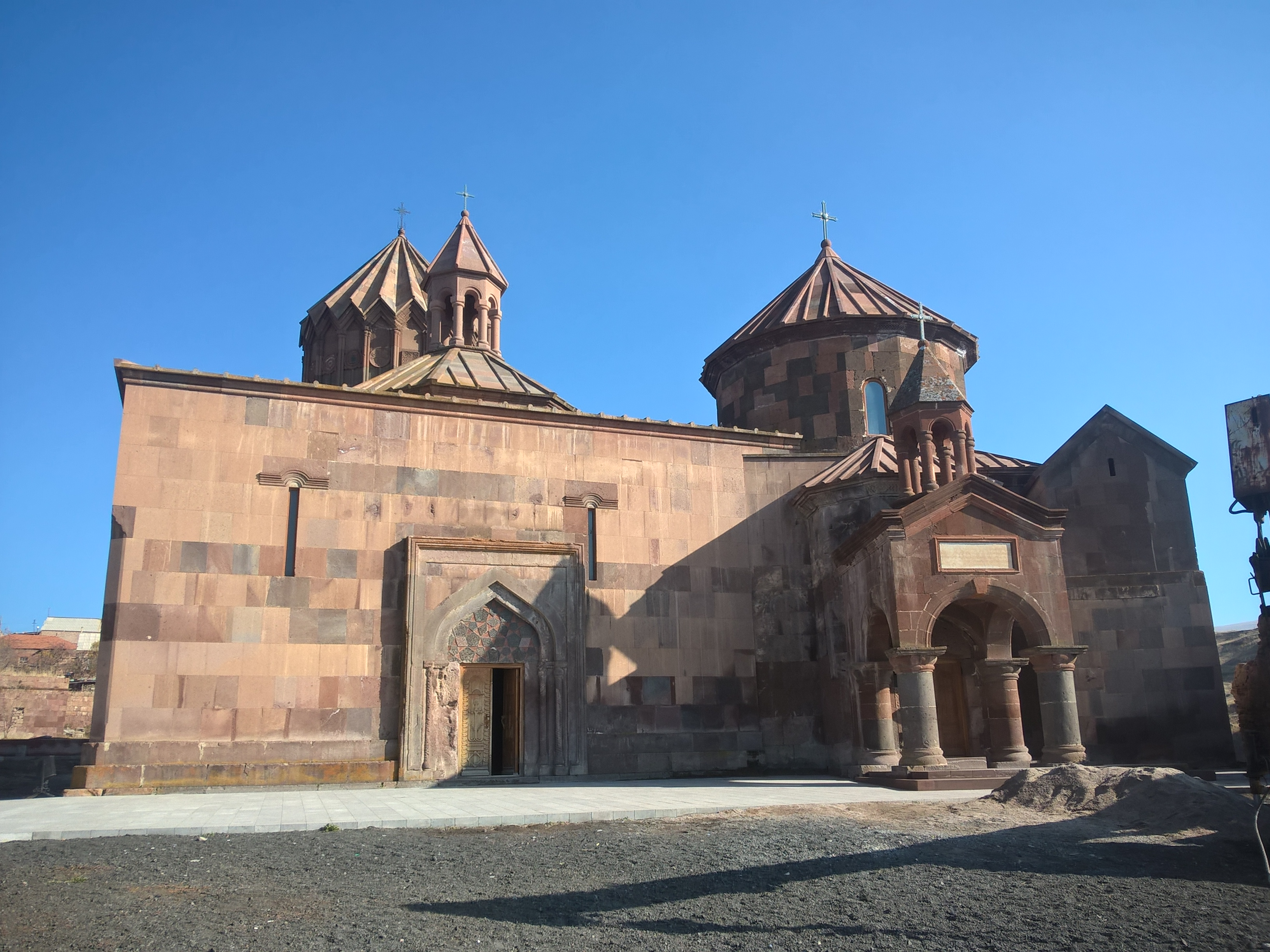
Zhamatun of Harichavank Monastery, 1201-1219

From the outside, a gavit or zhamatun only looks like a big rectangular block in front of a church, often with a colonnaded belvedere on top convering the hole of the oculus.

It seems that zhamatun was used to refer to new structures built more-or-less contemporaneously with the neighbouring church to serve funerary or commemorative functions, while the terms gavit referred to a space built next to older churches, covering existing ancient gravestones. "Gawit‘" had an ancient meaning of "open courtyard" referring to the existing space around old churches where the graves of the nobility were already placed, while žami tun means “house of hours” in Armenian, "zam" designating a time of the day dedicated to prayer.

== Structure ==
The earliest style of gavit consists of an oblong vault supported by double arches, with an erdik (lantern or oculus) center, and adorned with eight decorated slabs, as seen in the earliest known gavit at Horomos dated 1038. In later types the vault would often be decorated with muqarnas stalactite designs. This early type of muqarnas vault used cut stone in a way similar to that of Anatolian Seljuk architecture, different from the typical Armenian vault construction, which used thin stone facing on mortared rubble. This form was replaced by a square room with four columns, divided into nine sections with a dome in the center. The muqarnas motif was clearly inspired by Islamic sources, but it was used differently, and the Armenian muqarnas vault with oculus was not found in the Muslim world until it was copied about a century later, as in the vault of the Yakutiye Madrasa in nearby Erzurum (1310). The "lightwell" itself, with central oculus, is known in Anatolian art from earlier periods, as in the Divriği Great Mosque and Hospital (built 1228-1229). The last evolution consists of a gavit without columns and with arched ceilings.

On the west side of the Church of the Holy Redeemer in the Sanahin Monastery complex, the gavit built in 1181 has four tall free-standing internal pillars supporting arches. The pillars and their bases are elaborately decorated. In the same complex, the gavit of the Mother of God church is a three-nave hall with lower arches and less elaborate decorations on the pillars.

== Major examples ==
Some major examples of gavits and zhamatuns, ordered chronologically:

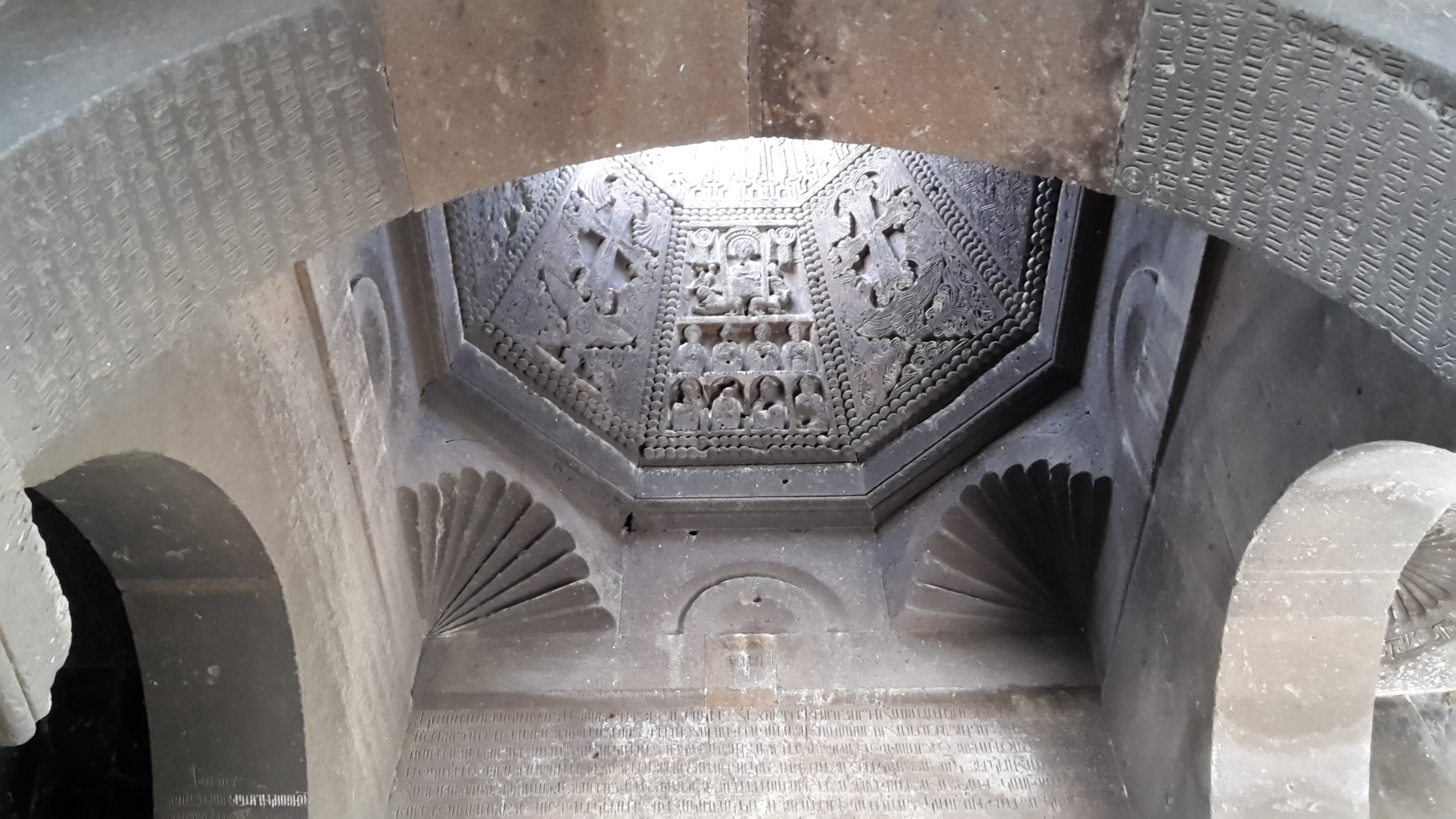
The first known zhamatun is from Horomos, dated 1038. Vault with oculus ("lightwell") and decorated slabs in an octagonal layout.

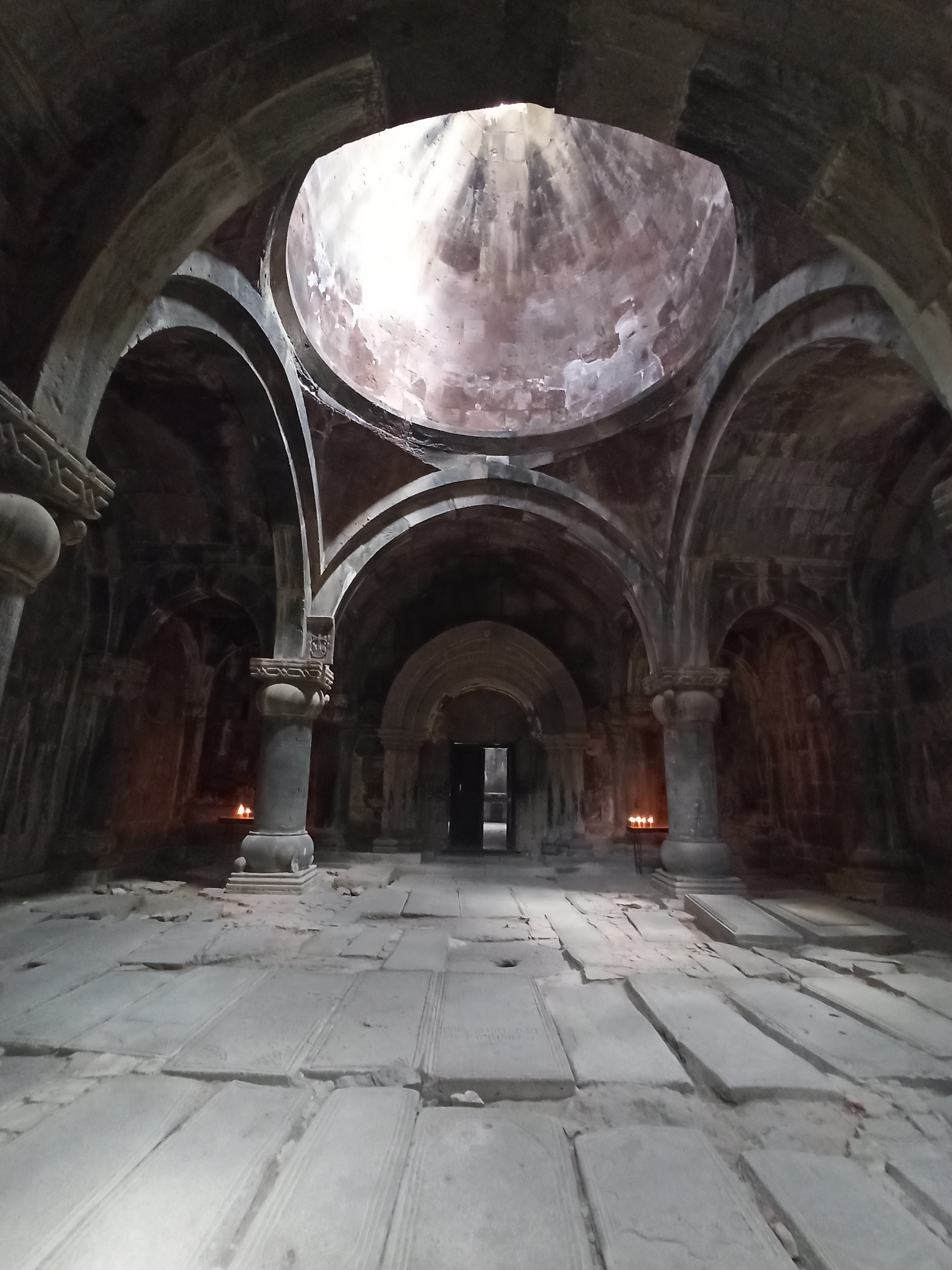
The gavit of the Church of St. Amenaprkitch in Sanahin Monastery, was built in 1181 and has an inscription mentioning Sargis Zakarian.

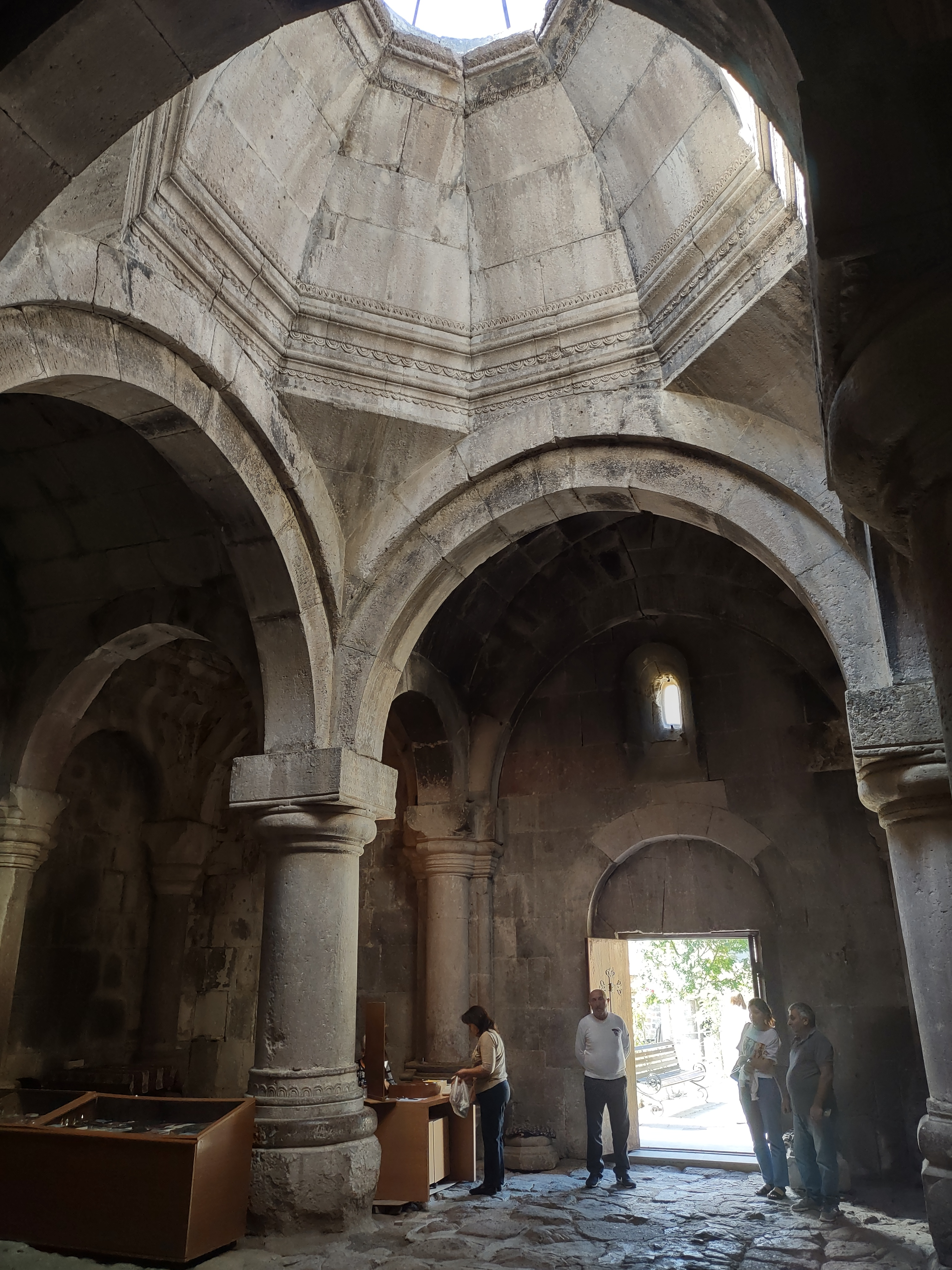
Goshavank (1197).

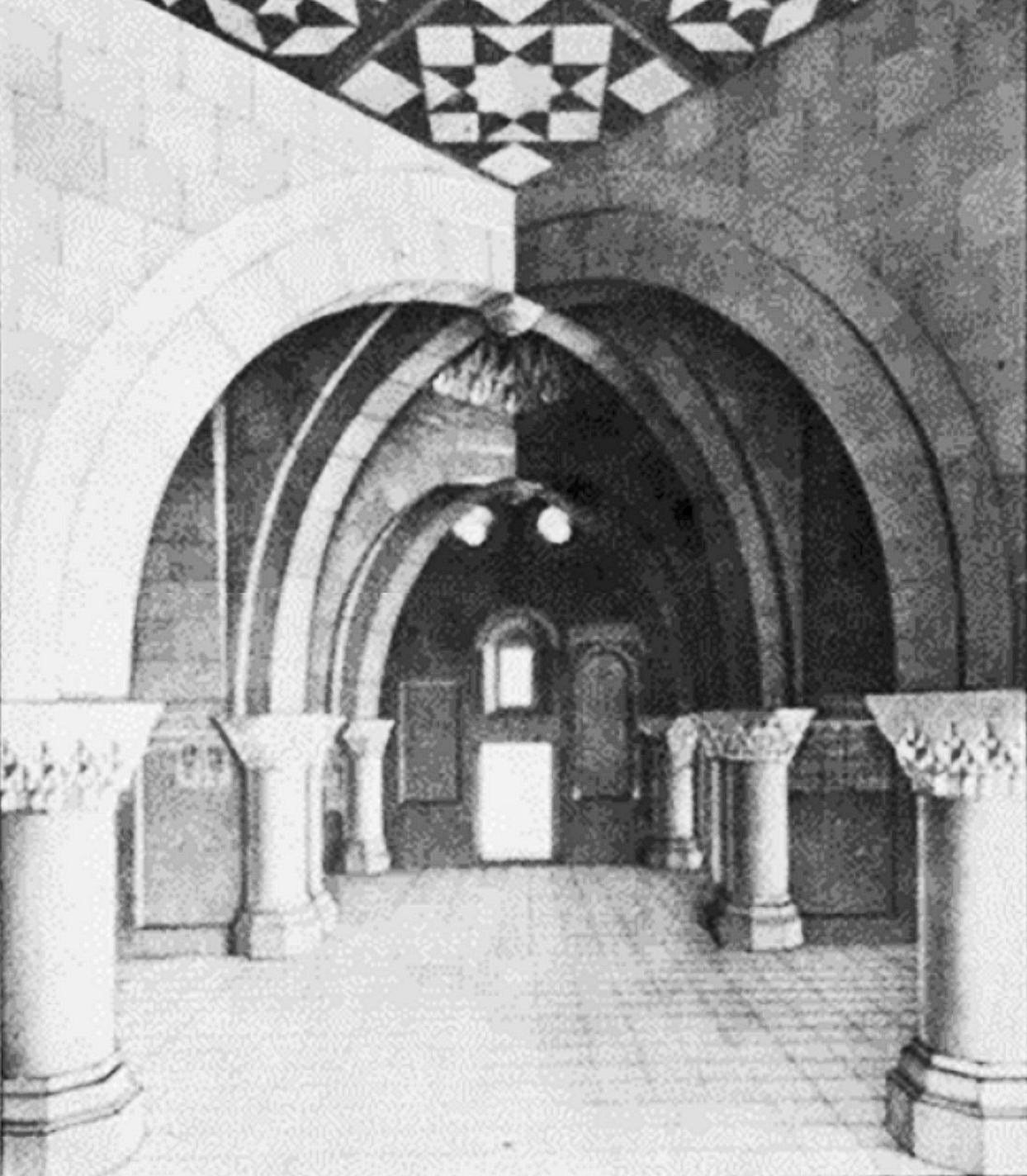
Gavit in the Church of the Holy Apostles in Ani (after 1031, before 1215, probably c. 1200).

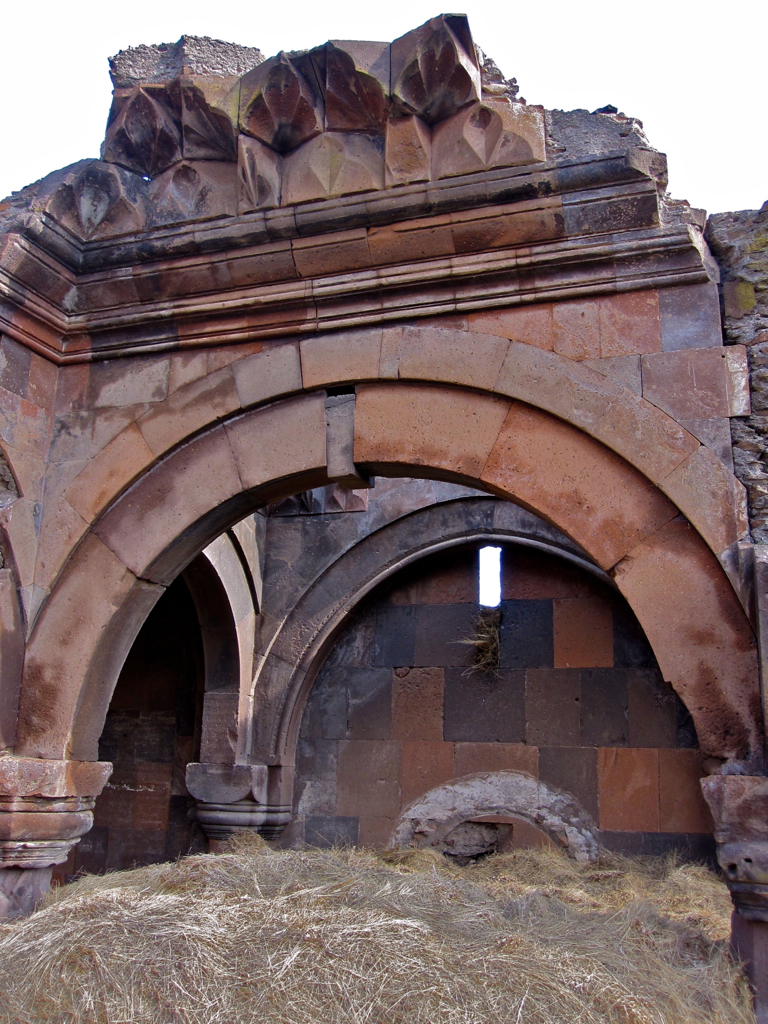
Remains of zhamatun with muqarnas-decorated vault, Bagnayr Monastery, dated 1201.

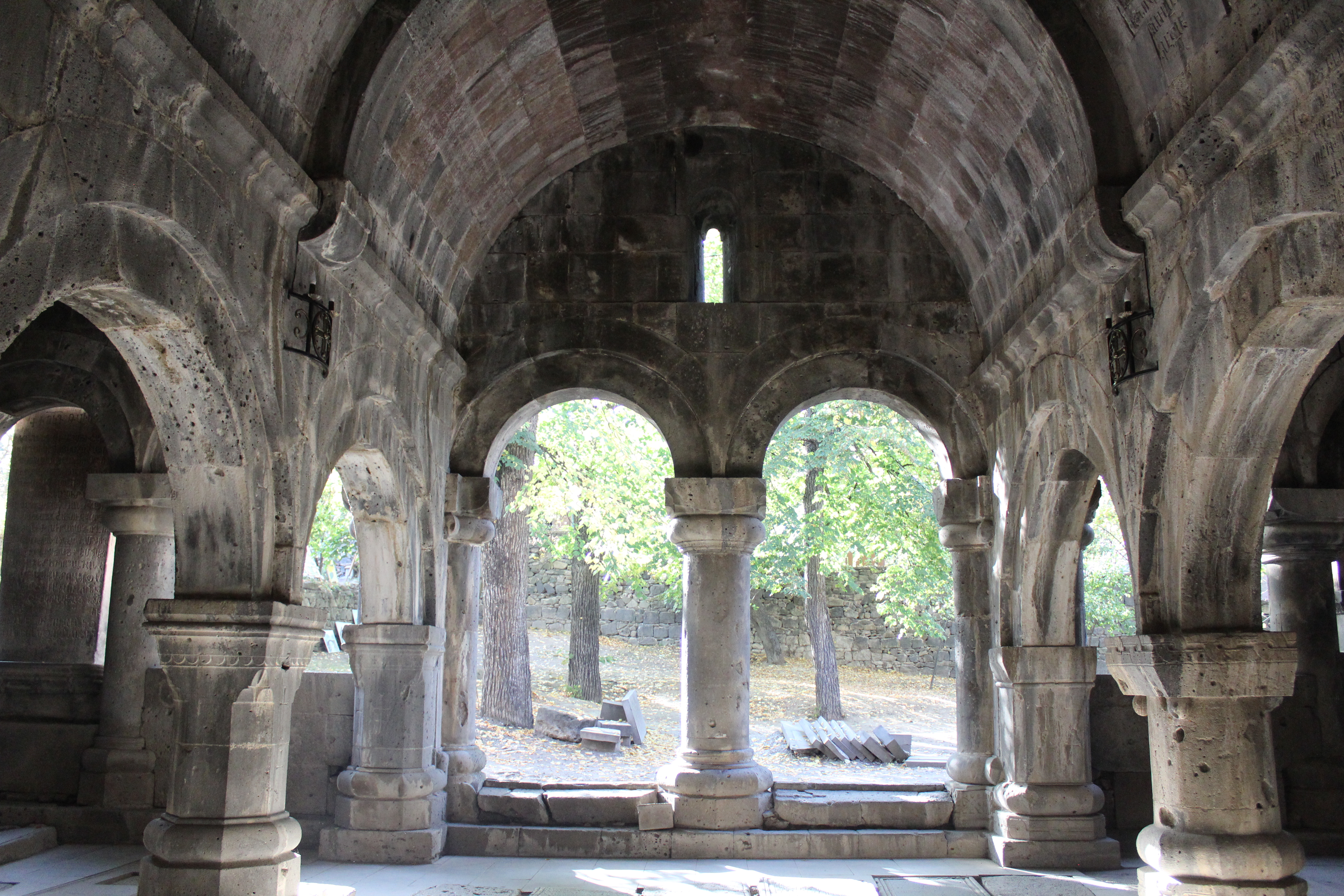
Gavit in the first style, Sanahin Monastery, Sourp Astvatsatsin, 1211 (no lightwell)

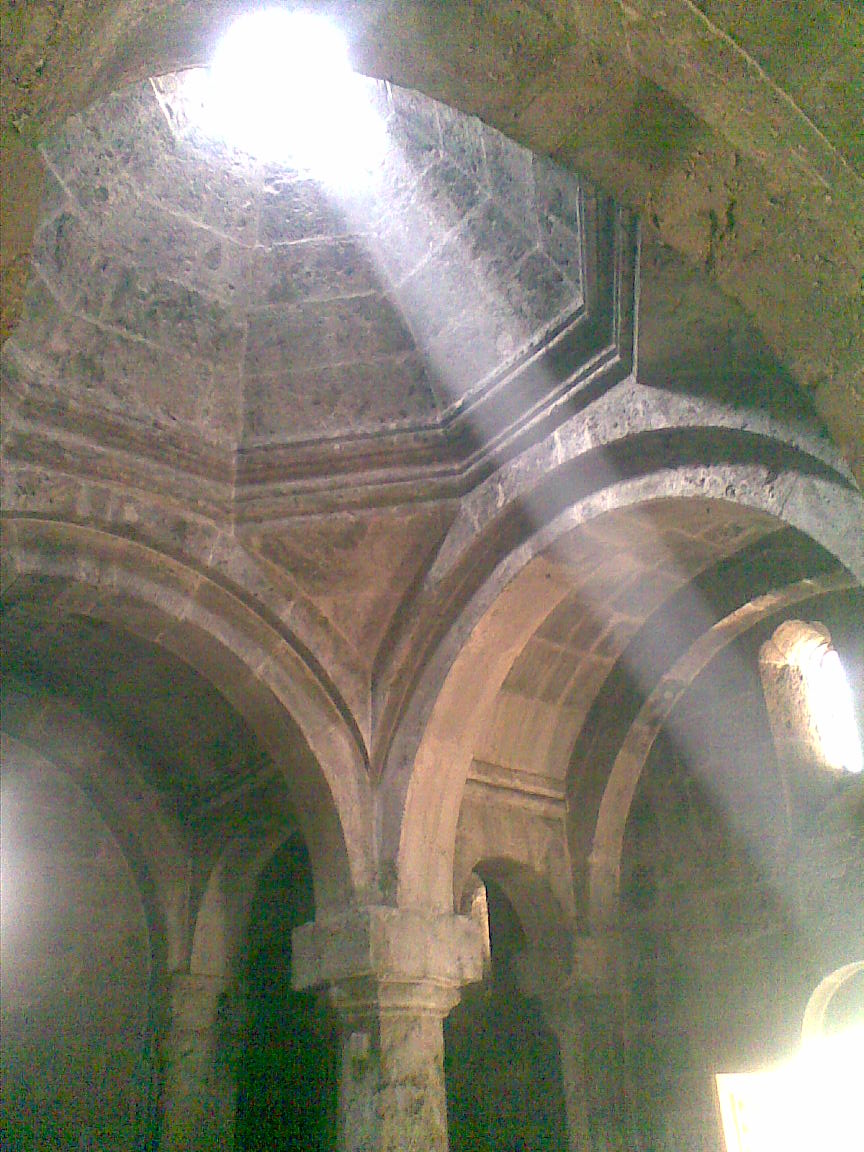
Haghartsin Monastery zhamatun built by Ivane I Zakarian c. 1215.

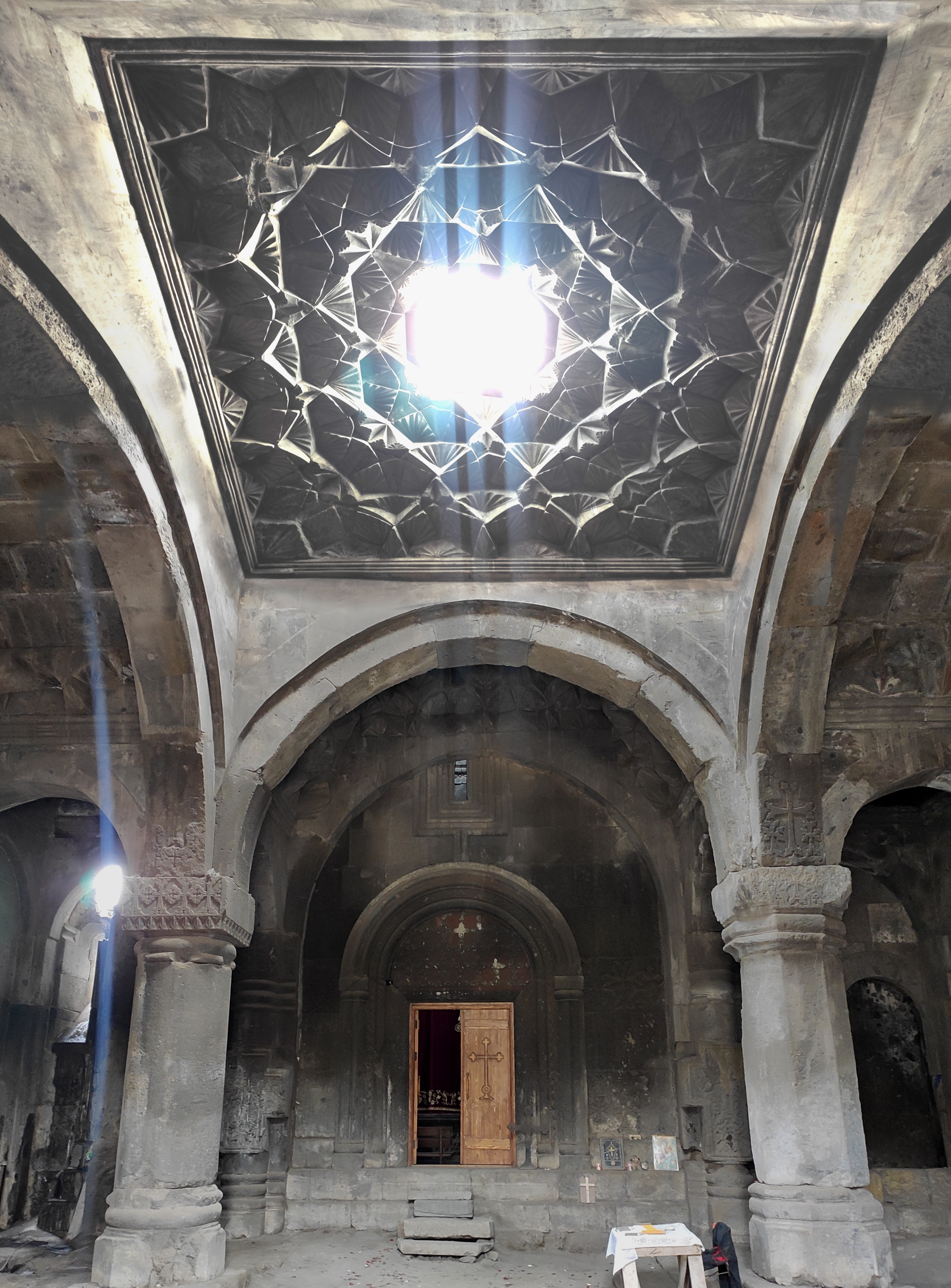
Astvatsankal Monastery: the gavit and its vault with muqarnas design, with a central erdik or oculus, which may have been covered by a colonnaded canopy. 1250.

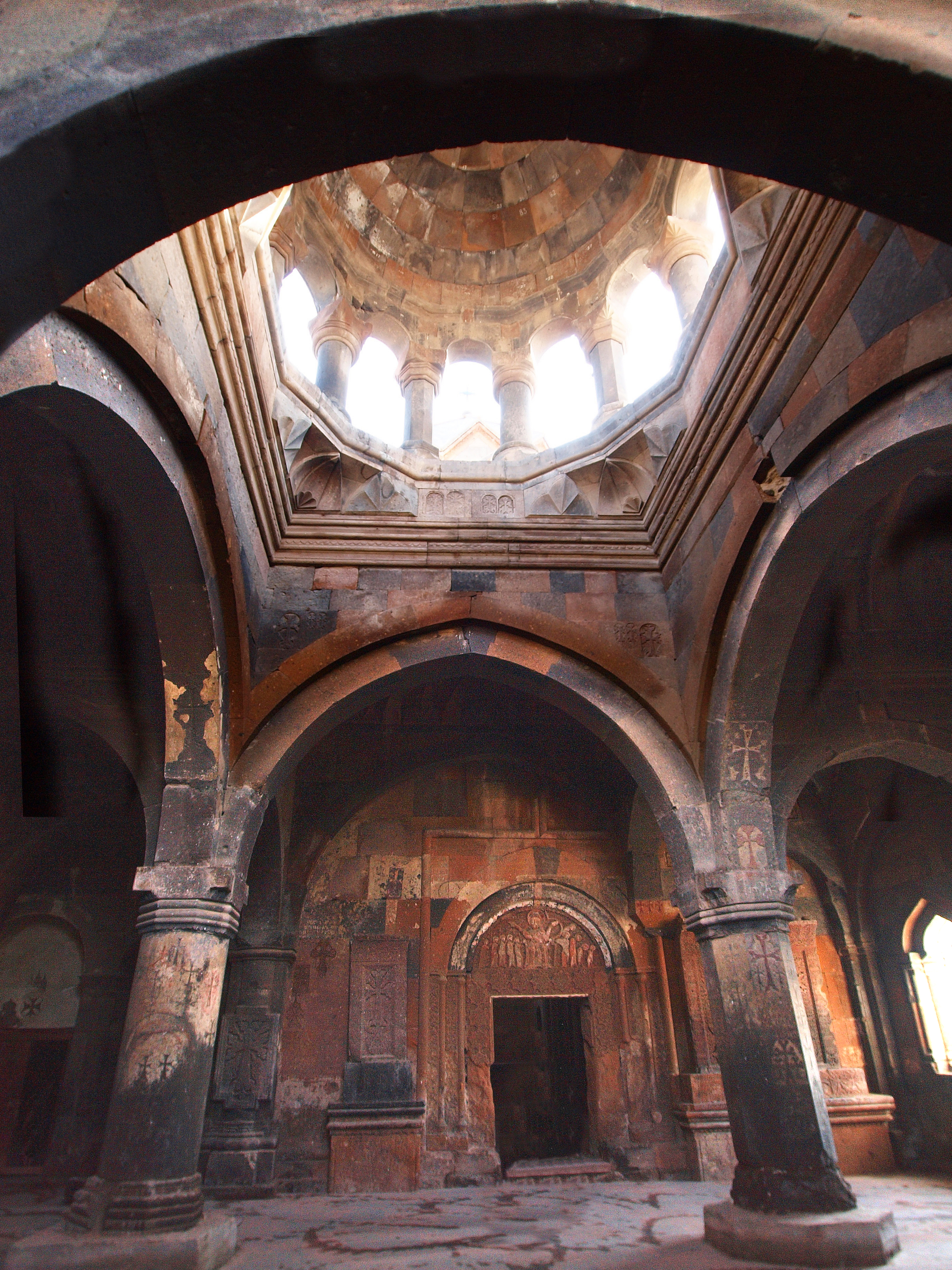
Gavit of Hovhannavank, completed in 1250 by Kurd Vachutian.

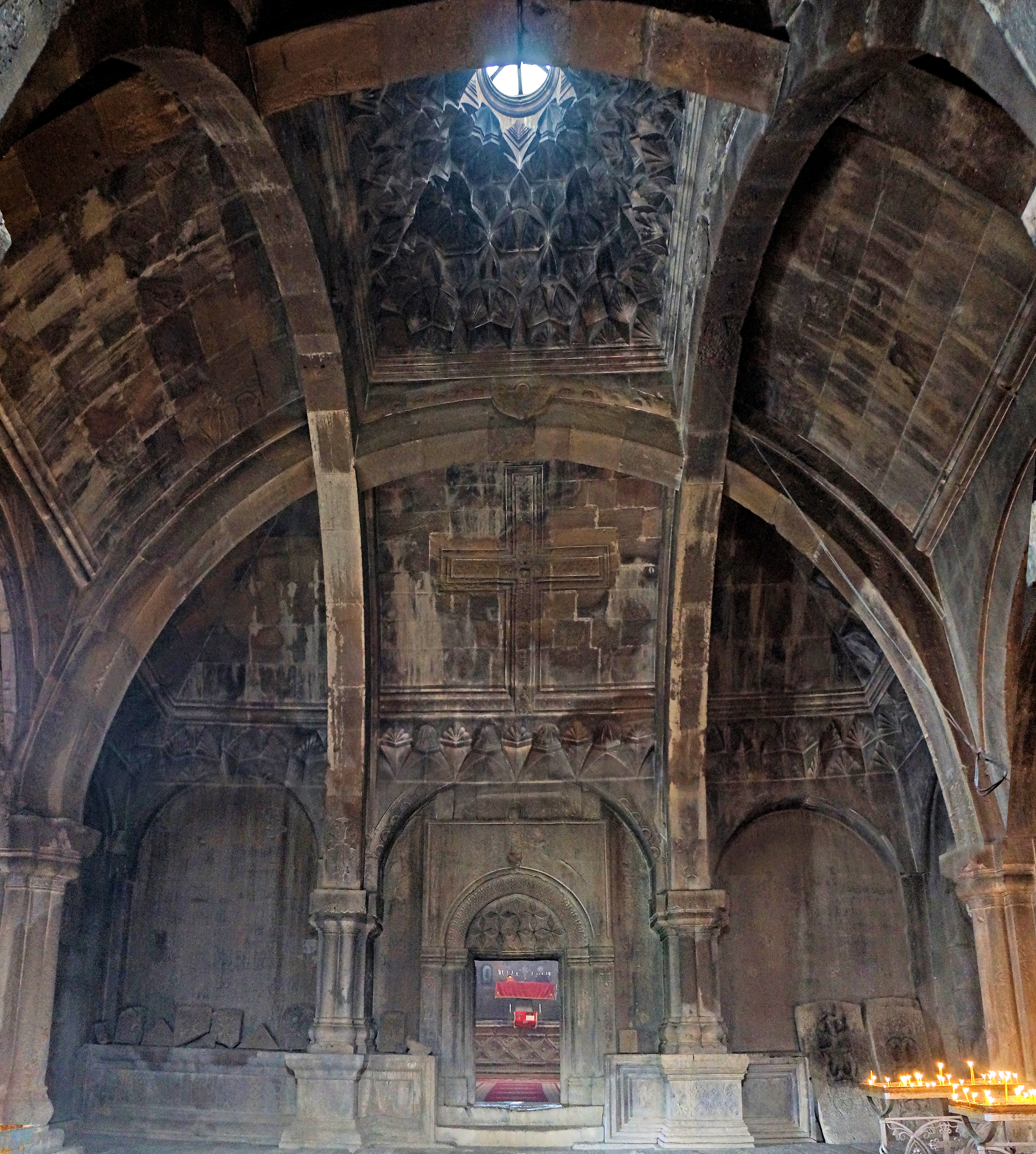
Gandzasar zhamatun, dedicated by Hasan-Jalal Dawla in 1261.

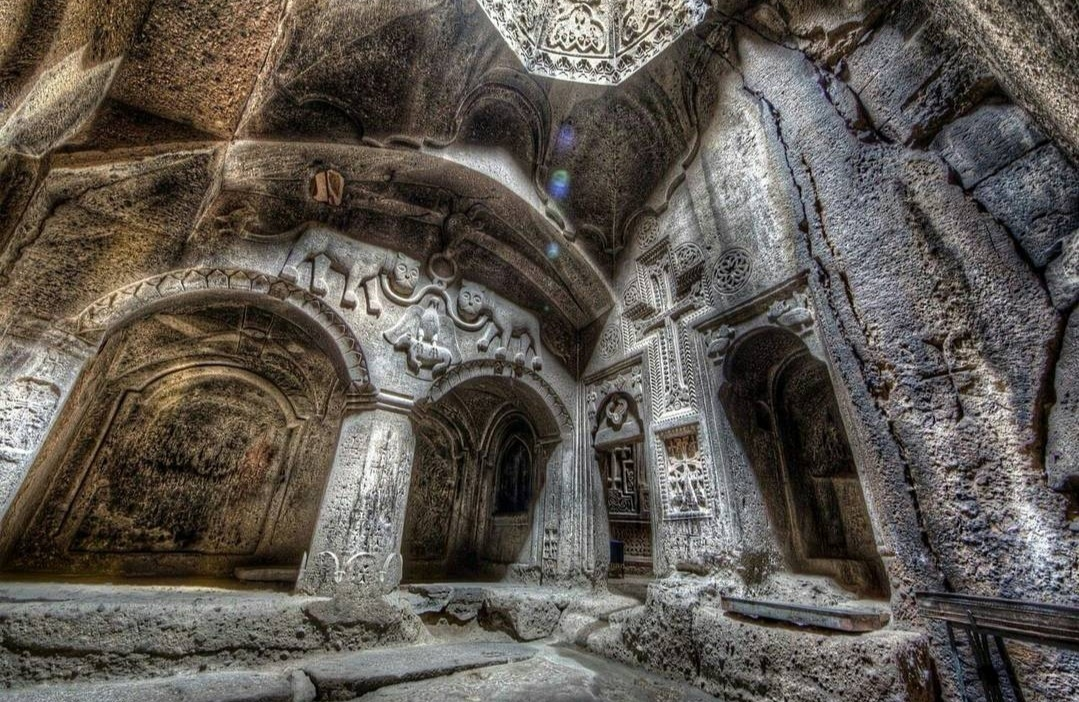
Zhamatun of Prince Prosh Khaghbakian (1283). The tombs are behind the twin arches. The entrance to the Proshyan chapel is to the right.

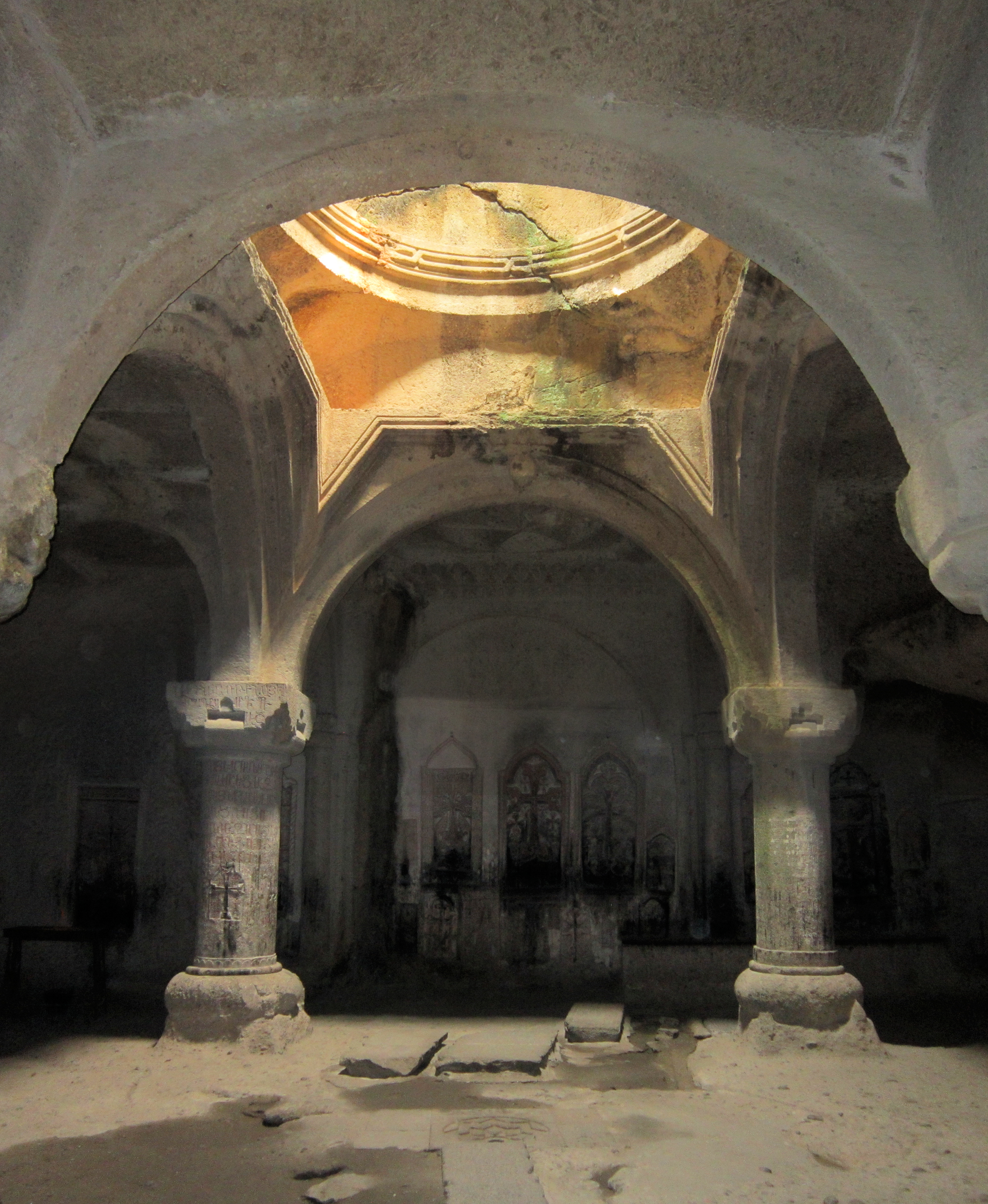
Zhamatun (1288), tomb of Papak Proshyan and his wife Ruzukana
