= Yakutiye Medrese =

14th-century madrasa in Erzurum, Turkey

Coordinates: 39.9064°N 41.2721°E

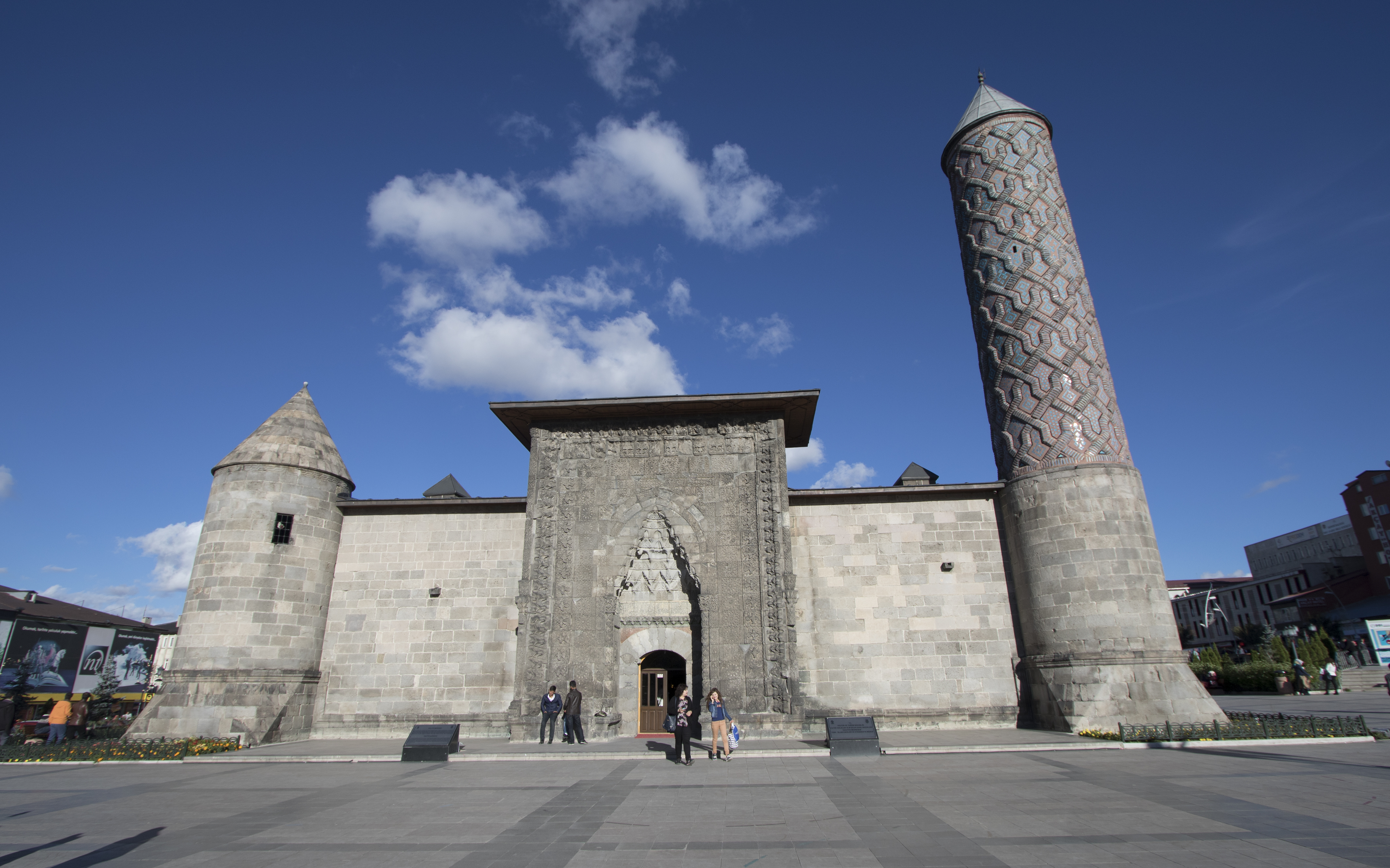

Religion
- Affiliation: Islam
- District: Erzurum
- Province: Erzurum
- Region: Eastern Anatolia

Location
- Location: Erzurum, Turkey
- Interactive map of Yakutiye Medrese

Architecture
- Type: Madrasa
- Style: Seljuk
- Completed: 1310
- Minaret: 1

Yakutiye Medrese (Turkish: Yâkutiye Medresesi) is a historical 14th-century Madrasa in Erzurum, Turkey. The madrasa was built in 1310 by order of a local governor of the Ilkhanids, Hoca Yakut, and it is named after him.

== Building ==
It is a rectangular building with an inner courtyard, surrounded by the rooms for the students. It has a monumental portal decorated with stone carvings and one Minaret with geometrical decorations. There is also an adjoining Kümbet. Today the building is used as a museum dedicated to ethnography and Turkish and Islamic art.

== Vault ==
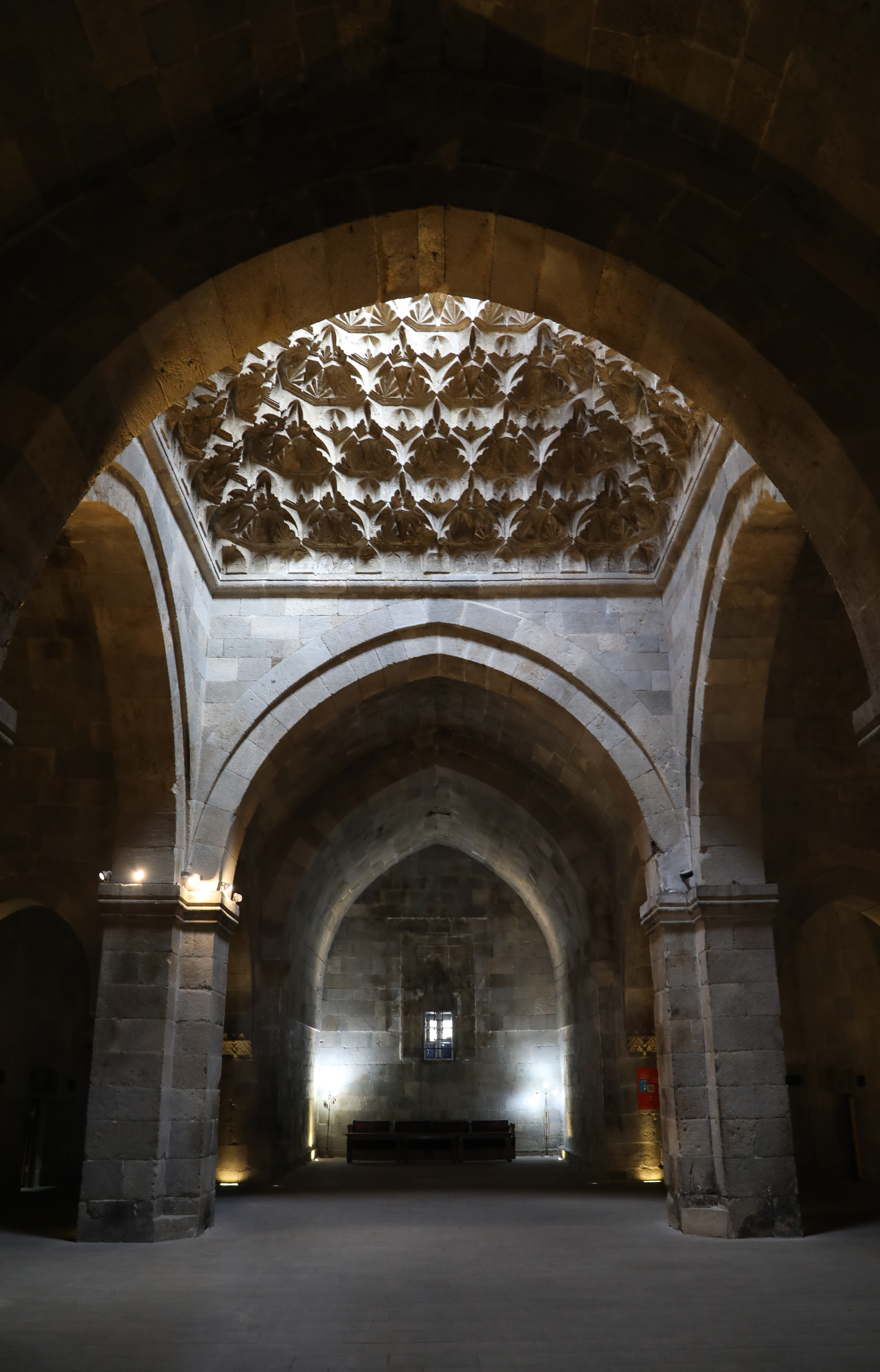
Vault design of the Yakutiye Medrese

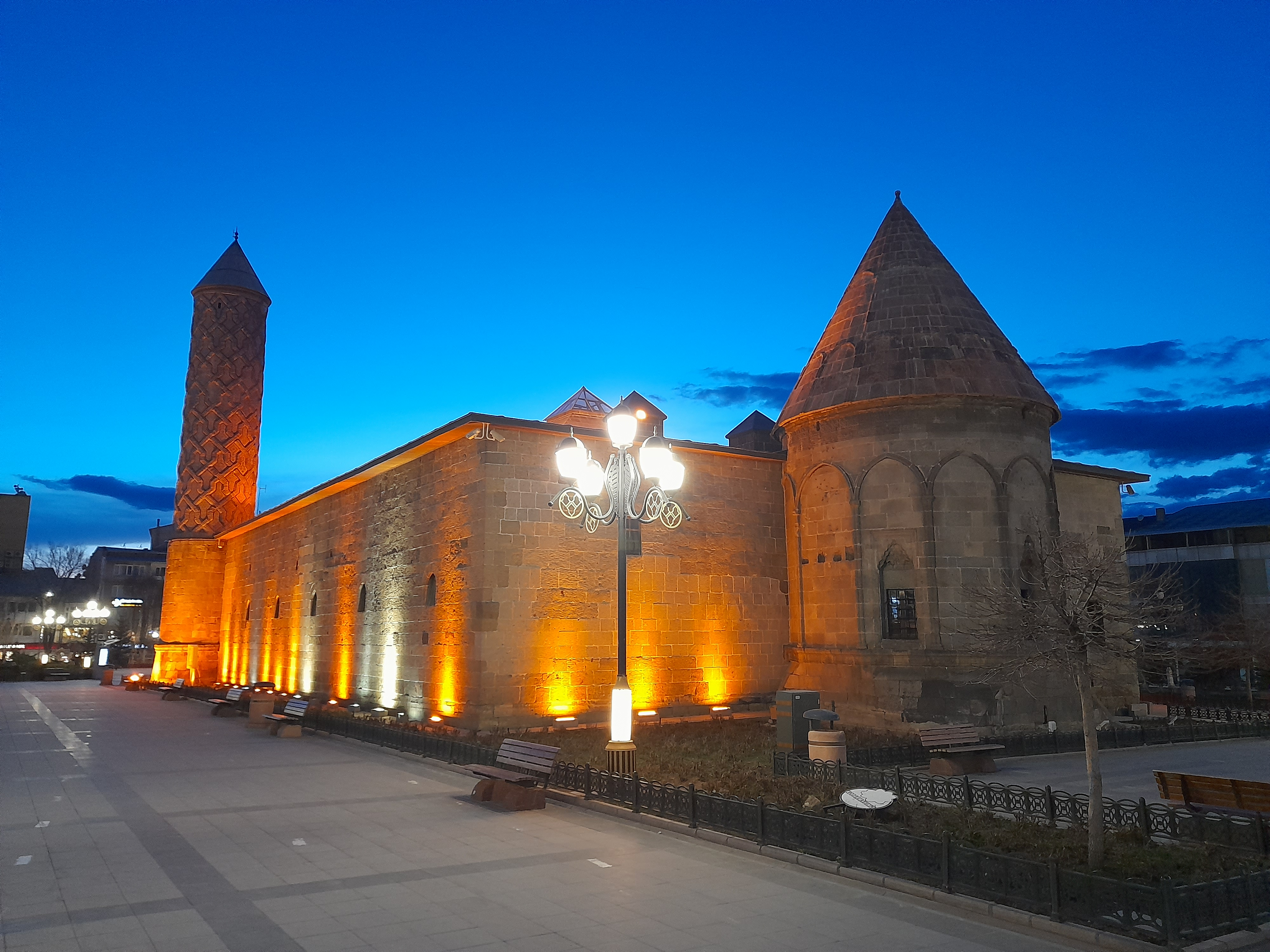
The eastern view of Yakutiye Medrese at sunset

The Yakutiye Medrese mosque has a vault decorated with muqarna design and a central oculus, which was constructed in 1310 and ultimately derived from the vault of the Armenian gavit narthex.
