= Ani (given name) =

Ani (Armenian: Անի) is an Armenian feminine given name given in reference to the medieval Armenian capital city of Ani. The name was among the top 10 most popular names given to newborn girls in Armenia in 2012. It is also a nickname.

In the Māori language, it is a transliteration of the names Ann, Anne, and Annie.

Notable people with the name include:

- Ani Batikian (born 1982), Armenian violinist living in Scotland
- Ani Bitenc (1933–2024), Slovenian translator
- Ani Choying Drolma (born 1971), Nepalese Buddhist nun and musician
- Ani DiFranco (born 1970), American singer, guitarist, and songwriter
- Ani Ghukasyan (born 1990), Armenian professional footballer
- Ani Hona (1938–1997), New Zealand Māori writer, poet; founding member of the Te Reo Māori Society
- Ani Idrus (1918–1999), Sumatran reporter and co-founder of Waspada daily newspaper
- Ani Kaaro (died 1901), New Zealand tribal leader and prophet
- Ani Kavafian (born 1948), classical violinist
- Ani Khachikyan (sprinter) (born 1991), track and field sprint athlete who competes internationally for Armenia
- Ani Mijačika (born 1987), professional Croatian tennis player
- Ani Mirotadze (born 1975), Georgian journalist and politician
- Ani Nyhus (born 1983), Canadian softball pitcher
- Ani Pachen (1933–2002), Tibetan Buddhist nun who led her clan in armed rebellion against China
- Ani Palian, 21st century Ukrainian Paralympic swimmer
- Ani Phyo (born 1968), organic eco chef, author, founder of SmartMonkey Foods
- Ani Samsonyan (born 1990), Armenian politician and journalist
- Ani Sarkisian (born 1995), American–Armenian footballer
- Ani Widyani Soetjipto (born 1961), Indonesian international relations academic and researcher
- Ani Zalinyan (born 1993), Dutch politician
- Ani, Theban scribe for whom the Papyrus of Ani was compiled

== See also ==
- Ani (disambiguation)
- Ani (surname)
- Ant (name)
