= Ani (disambiguation) =

Ani is a ruined Armenian medieval city in Turkey.

Ani or ANI may also refer to:

== Places ==
- Ani, Akita, town in Japan
- Ani Rural District, in Iran
- Āņi, village in Ādaži Municipality, Latvia
- Ani, Himachal Pradesh, or Anni, a subdivision of Kullu district, Himachal Pradesh, India
  - Anni Assembly constituency
- Andaman and Nicobar Islands, group of islands in the Indian Ocean
- Ani, Artsakh, or Qoşasu, a village administered by the Republic of Artsakh (1992–2020) and then Azerbaijan (2020–)
- Aniak Airport (IATA code: ANI) an airport in Alaska, US

== People ==
- Ani (given name)
- Ani (surname)
- Ani Lorak (born 1978), Ukrainian pop singer
- Ani (pharaoh), Egyptian pharaoh
- Ani, the compiler of the ancient Egyptian Papyrus of Ani

== Religion ==
- Ani (nun), prefix added to the name of nuns in Tibetan Buddhism
- Ani (Etruscan divinity), Etruscan god of the sky
- Ani, an Egyptian deity, consort of Anit
- Ala (odinani), also called Ani, Igbo goddess

== Organisations ==
- Agencia Nacional de Inteligencia, the intelligence agency of Chile
- Alliance of Nonprofits for Insurance, Risk Retention Group, the nationwide insurer in the Nonprofits Insurance Alliance
- Armenian National Institute, organization dedicated to the research of the Armenian Genocide
- Asian News International, regional news agency based in New Delhi, India
- Athletics Norfolk Island, the governing body for athletics in Norfolk Island
- Australian National Industries, defunct Australian heavy engineering company
- Autism Network International, autism advocacy organization
- Italian Nationalist Association (Italian: Associazione Nazionalista Italiana), defunct Italian political party
- National Alliance of Independents (Spanish: Alianza Nacional de Independientes), political party in Chile

== Other uses ==
- Ani (bird), birds in the genus Crotophaga of the cuckoo family
- Āni, third month of Tamil calendar
- Artificial narrow intelligence
- Automatic number identification, feature of a telecommunications network for automatically determining the origination telephone number
- Ancestral North Indian, in Genetics and archaeogenetics of South Asia
- ANI (file format), graphics file format used for animated cursors on the MS Windows operating system
- Ani (letter), letter of the Georgian alphabet
- Anakin Skywalker nicknamed Ani, character in the Star Wars universe
- Ani (musical), musical parody of Star Wars (2014)
- 791 Ani, minor planet
- Andi language (ISO 639 code: ani), Northeast Caucasian language
- ǁAni language (ISO 639 code: hnh) a Southern Africa language
- Ani, an anime-style companion in the generative AI chatbot Grok

== See also ==
- Anni (disambiguation)
- Anie (disambiguation)
- Any (disambiguation)
- Wikipedia: Administrators' noticeboard/Incidents, often referred to by the shortcut WP:ANI
