= Anni =

Anni may refer to:

== People ==
- Anni (given name), a list of people with the given name
- The popular name of Mohamed Nasheed (born 1967), third president of the second republic of the Maldives

== Places ==
- Anni, India, or Ani, a subdivision of Kullu district, Himachal Pradesh, India
  - Anni Assembly constituency

== Film ==
- Anni (1948 film), an Austrian-German film directed by Max Neufeld
- Anni (1951 film), an Indian Tamil-language film directed by K. S. Prakash Rao
- Anni (TV series), an Indian Tamil-language TV series written and produced by K. Balachander

== Fictional characters ==
- Anni, a character in the puzzle game Baba Is You

== See also ==
- Ani (disambiguation)
- Annie (disambiguation)
- Any (disambiguation)
