= Ani (surname) =

Ani is a surname. Notable people with the surname include:

- Jananne Al-Ani (born 1966), artist, born to an Iraqi father and Irish mother
- Jeremiah Ani (born 1985), Nigerian international footballer
- Kwadwo Ani, one of Ghana's premier contemporary artists
- Maret Ani (born 1982), Estonian tennis player
- Marimba Ani, anthropologist and African Studies scholar
- Michael Ani (born 1917), chairman of FEDECO in Nigeria

== See also ==
- Ani (disambiguation)
- Ani (given name)
- Ant (name)
