= 137 Meliboea =

Main-belt asteroid

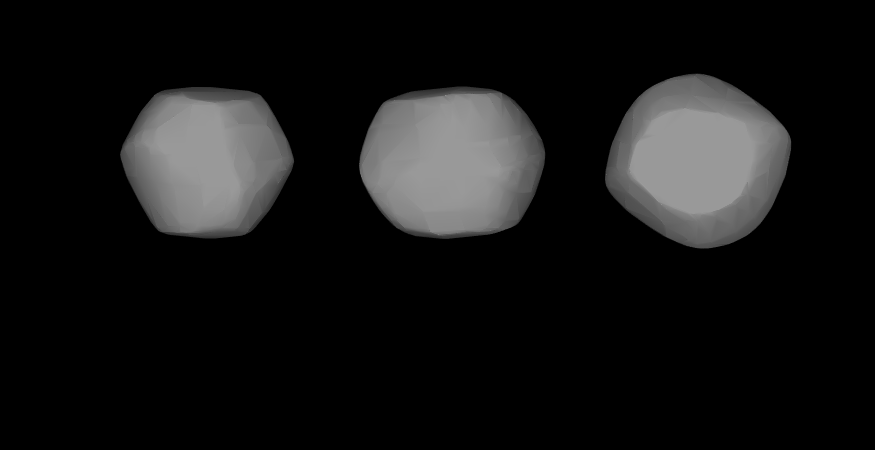
- Lightcurve-based 3D model of 137 Meliboea

Discovery
- Discovered by: J. Palisa
- Discovery site: Austrian Naval Obs.
- Discovery date: 21 April 1874

Designations
- Pronunciation: /mɛlɪˈbiːə/
- Named after: Meliboea, daughter of Oceanus
- Alternative designations: A874 HA · A923 FA · 1958 UE · 1962 GB (Note: The MPC notates Meliboae's retroactive new-style designations as 1874 HA and 1923 FA.)
- Minor planet category: main-belt · (outer); Meliboea
- Adjectives: Meliboean /mɛlɪˈbiːən/

Orbital characteristics
- Epoch 23 March 2018 (JD 2458200.5)
- Uncertainty parameter 0
- Observation arc: 133.02 yr (48,587 d)
- Aphelion: 3.7859 AU
- Perihelion: 2.4619 AU
- Semi-major axis: 3.1239 AU
- Eccentricity: 0.2119
- Orbital period (sidereal): 5.52 yr (2,017 d)
- Mean anomaly: 327.88°
- Mean motion: 0° 10^{m} 42.6^{s} / day
- Inclination: 13.432°
- Longitude of ascending node: 202.22°
- Argument of perihelion: 107.17°

Physical characteristics
- Mean diameter: 128.7±0.5 km 145.92±3.58 km (composite estimate)
- Mass: (2.40±0.43)×10^{18} kg (Note: Calculated from its standard gravitational parameter GM = 0.160±0.029 km^{3}/s^{2}.)
- Mean density: 2.15 g/cm^{3} (Note: Assuming a diameter of 129 km.)
- Synodic rotation period: 25.676 h
- Geometric albedo: 0.0503±0.002; 0.0492 ± 0.0128
- Spectral type: C (Tholen)
- Absolute magnitude (H): 8.05; 8.10

137 Meliboea is a large, dark main-belt asteroid that was discovered by Austrian astronomer J. Palisa at the Austrian Naval Observatory on 21 April 1874, the second of his many asteroid discoveries. It was later named after Meliboea, the daughter of Oceanus and Tethys in Greek mythology. The largest body in the Meliboea family of asteroids that share similar orbital elements, only 791 Ani approaches its size. It is classified as a C-type asteroid and may be composed of carbonaceous materials. The spectra of the asteroid displays evidence of aqueous alteration.

Photometric observations of this asteroid made at the Torino Observatory in Italy during 1990–1991 were used to determine a synodic rotation period of 15.28 ± 0.02 hours. A 2009 study at the Organ Mesa Observatory in Las Cruces, New Mexico found a period of 25.676 ± 0.001 hours and a brightness variation of 0.16 ± 0.02 in magnitude. They ruled out a period of 15 hours determined in previous studies.

During 2002, 137 Meliboea was observed by radar from the Arecibo Observatory. The return signal matched an effective diameter of 144 ± 16 km. This is consistent with the asteroid dimensions computed through other means.
