= 791 Ani =

Main-belt Asteroid

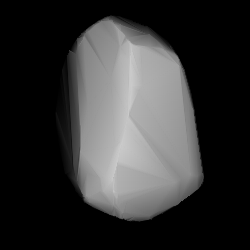
- Modelled shape of Ani from its lightcurve

Discovery
- Discovered by: G. Neujmin
- Discovery site: Simeiz Obs.
- Discovery date: 29 June 1914

Designations
- Named after: Historic city of Ani
- Alternative designations: A914 MB · 1949 WH; 1964 PO · 1975 XM; 1914 UV
- Minor planet category: main-belt · (outer); Meliboea · Bg

Orbital characteristics
- Epoch 31 May 2020 (JD 2459000.5)
- Uncertainty parameter 0
- Observation arc: 104.08 yr (38,017 d)
- Aphelion: 3.7242 AU
- Perihelion: 2.5197 AU
- Semi-major axis: 3.1219 AU
- Eccentricity: 0.1929
- Orbital period (sidereal): 5.52 yr (2,015 d)
- Mean anomaly: 33.057°
- Mean motion: 0° 10^{m} 43.32^{s} / day
- Inclination: 16.381°
- Longitude of ascending node: 129.81°
- Argument of perihelion: 201.49°

Physical characteristics
- Dimensions: 65.7 km × 103.5 km
- Mean diameter: 99.20±4.96 km (composite estimate) Individual estimates: 97.87±1.15 km; 99.799±11.027 km; 103.52±1.9 km
- Mass: (7.5±7.5)×10^{17} kg (Note: Calculated from its standard gravitational parameter GM = 0.05±0.05 km^{3}/s^{2}.) (SB441)
- Mean density: 1.3–1.5 g/cm^{3} (calculated)
- Synodic rotation period: 11.174±0.004 h
- Pole ecliptic latitude: (94.0°, −25.0°) (λ_{1}/β_{1}); (269.0°, 4.0°) (λ_{2}/β_{2})
- Geometric albedo: 0.0329±0.001; 0.035±0.016; 0.037±0.001
- Spectral type: Tholen = C; C (S3OS2-TH); Ch (S3OS2-BB); B–V = 0.708±0.020; U–B = 0.282±0.026
- Absolute magnitude (H): 9.2; 9.25

791 Ani (prov. designation: A914 MB or 1914 UV) is a very large asteroid of the Meliboea family, located in the outer regions of the asteroid belt. It was discovered on 29 June 1914, by Russian astronomer Grigory Neujmin at the Simeiz Observatory on the Crimean peninsula. The dark carbonaceous C-type asteroid has a rotation period of 11.2 hours and measures approximately 65.7 × 103.5 kilometers, with a mean diameter of 100 km (62 mi). It was named after the historic Armenian city of Ani.

== Orbit and classification ==
When applying the hierarchical clustering method (HCM) to its proper orbital elements, Ani is a member of the Meliboea family (604), a small family of carbonaceous asteroids in the outer main belt, named after its principal body, 137 Meliboea. However, according to another HCM-analysis by Milani and Knežević (AstDyS), it is a background asteroid as this analysis does not recognize the Meliboea family. Ani orbits the Sun in the outer asteroid belt at a distance of 2.5–3.7 AU once every 5 years and 6 months (2,015 days; semi-major axis of 3.12 AU). Its orbit has an eccentricity of 0.19 and an inclination of 16° with respect to the ecliptic. The body's observation arc begins at Algiers Observatory in North Africa on 6 December 1915, some 17 months after its official discovery observation at Simeiz Observatory.

== Naming ==
This minor planet was named after the medieval city of Ani, which was destroyed by an earthquake in 1319. The ruins of the former capital of the Armenian kingdom are located near the border to Armenia, in what is now Turkey. Ani was known as "the city of 1001 churches". The naming was also mentioned in The Names of the Minor Planets by Paul Herget in 1955 (H 79).

== Physical characteristics ==
In the Tholen classification, Ani is a common, carbonaceous C-type asteroid. It is also a common C-type in the Tholen-like taxonomy of the Small Solar System Objects Spectroscopic Survey (S3OS2), while in the survey's SMASS-like taxonomic variant, the asteroid is a hydrated carbonaceous subtype (Ch).

=== Rotation period and poles ===
In May 2018, a rotational lightcurve of Ani was obtained from photometric observations by American amateur astronomer Tom Polakis at the Command Module Observatory (V02) in Arizona . Lightcurve analysis gave a well-defined rotation period of 11.174±0.004 hours with a brightness variation of 0.28±0.02 magnitude (U=3).

In June 2002, Brian Warner at his Palmer Divide Observatory first observed this asteroid and later derived a period of 16.8±0.1 hours and an amplitude of 0.35±0.05 magnitude, based on poor data (U=1). (Note: Lightcurve plot of (791) Ani, Palmer Divide Observatory, B. D. Warner (2002). Rotation period 16.8±0.1 hours with a brightness amplitude of >0.1 mag, based on a revision from 2011. Quality code is 1. Summary figures at the LCDB.) In December 2004, and in May 2007, two periods of 22.850±0.003 h and 22.85±0.05 h with a corresponding amplitude of 0.17±0.01 and 0.38±0.02 magnitude were determined by European astronomers Raymond Poncy (177) as well as Yves Revaz, Raoul Behrend, Alain Klotz, Michel Hernandez, Robert Soubie, Jean-François Gauthier, Bernard Tregon, Pierre Antonini, Laurent Bernasconi, Federico Manzini (A12), Yassine Damerdji and Horacio Correia. The two periods are slightly longer than twice Polakis' period solution (U=2/2−). In April 2007, astronomers at the Oakley Observatory (916), Indiana, obtained a period of 16.72±0.03 hours and an amplitude of 0.32±0.05 magnitude (U=2). In February 2011, French amateur astronomer René Roy determined a period of 12±0.5 hours and a brightness variation of 0.38±0.02 magnitude (U=2).

A modeled lightcurve by Josef Ďurech and Josef Hanuš, using photometric data including from the Lowell Photometric Database and from the Wide-field Infrared Survey Explorer (WISE) was published in 2018. It gave a sidereal period of 11.16954±0.00002 and two spin axes at (94.0°, −25.0°) and (269.0°, 4.0°) in ecliptic coordinates (λ, β).

=== Diameter and albedo ===
According to the surveys carried out by the Japanese Akari satellite, the NEOWISE mission of NASA's Wide-field Infrared Survey Explorer (WISE), and the Infrared Astronomical Satellite IRAS, Ani measures (97.87±1.15), (99.799±11.027) and (103.52±1.9) kilometers in diameter and its surface has an albedo of (0.037±0.001), (0.035±0.016) and (0.0329±0.001), respectively. The Collaborative Asteroid Lightcurve Link adopts the results obtained by IRAS, that is, an albedo of 0.0329 and a diameter of 103.52 kilometers based on an absolute magnitude of 9.25. Alternative mean-diameter measurements published by the WISE team include (82.500±5.957 km), (83.31±21.31 km), (93.29±31.33 km) and (116.865±1.024 km) with corresponding albedos of (0.0518±0.0131), (0.04±0.02), (0.04±0.02) and (0.026±0.003). On 7 April 2000, an asteroid occultation of Ani gave a best-fit ellipse dimension of (65.7 km × 103.5 km) with a good quality rating of 3. These timed observations are taken when the asteroid passes in front of a distant star.
