= Ani Kaaro =

New Zealand tribal leader and prophet

Ani Kaaro (–1901) was a New Zealand tribal leader and prophet. Of Māori descent, she identified with the Ngā Puhi iwi.
