= Any =

Any, ANY or Any Song may refer to:

- ANY (magazine), a New York–based architectural journal published from 1993 to 2000
- Any-Martin-Rieux, a commune in Aisne, Hauts-de-France, France
- Anthony Municipal Airport's IATA airport code
- Athabasca Northern Railway's reporting mark
- "Any", song by Mr. Children from Shifuku no Oto (2004)
- "Any", song by Stray Kids from Go Live (2020)
- "Any Song", 2020 single by Zico

== See also ==
- Some and any, for usage of these two English words
- Universal quantification, a logical quantifier expressed as "given any"
- Ani (disambiguation)
