= Lucy Der Manuelian =

American art historian

Lucy Der Manuelian (June 7, 1928 – September 20, 2021) was an American art historian specializing in Armenian art and architecture. Considered a pioneering American scholar of Armenian art and architecture, she held the Arthur H. Dadian and Ara T. Oztemel chair of Armenian art at Tufts University, the first and only endowed professorship of Armenian art outside Armenia, launched in 1984.

An Armenian-American, her career was partly inspired by her godfather, Arshag Fetvadjian, an artist who painted Armenian architectural monuments. She was educated at Harvard Radcliffe Institute. Her dissertation on Geghard, a 13th-century monastery, is considered to be the first American dissertation dedicated to Armenian art. Her doctoral supervisor at Boston University was Oleg Grabar. She authored articles on major Armenian monuments and artistic themes for Dictionary of the Middle Ages and Grove Dictionary of Art.
