= Ani =

Medieval Armenian city

- Անի (Armenian)
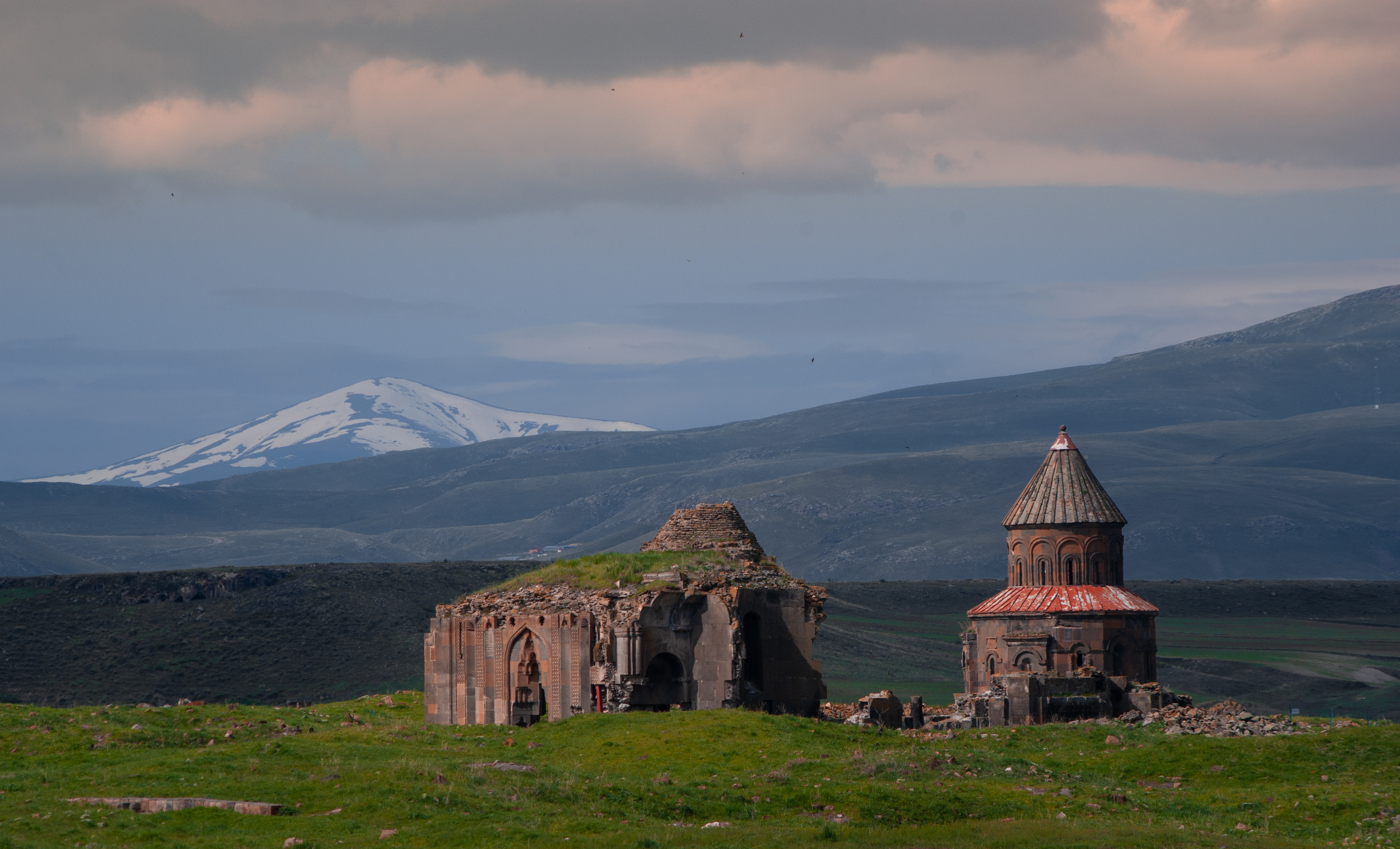
- Church of the Holy Apostles and Church of Saint Gregory of Abughamrentz, Ani

- Location of Ani
- 40°30′27″N 43°34′22″E
- Type: Settlement
- Periods: Middle Ages
- Cultures: Armenian (predominantly)
- Location: Ocaklı (nearest settlement), Kars Province, Turkey
- Region: Armenian highlands

History
- Built: 5th century (first mentioned)
- Abandoned: 17th century

Site notes
- Owner: Kingdom of Armenia (Middle Ages)

UNESCO World Heritage Site
- Official name: Archaeological Site of Ani
- Type: Cultural
- Criteria: ii, iii, iv
- Designated: 2016 (40th session)
- Reference no.: 1518
- Region: Europe and North America
- historical population of over 100,000

Ani (Armenian: Անի) (Note: Georgian: ანისი, anisi; Ancient Greek: Ἄνιον, romanized: Ánion; Latin: Abnicum) is a ruined medieval Armenian city now situated in Turkey's province of Kars, next to the closed border with Armenia.

Between 961 and 1045, it was the capital of the Bagratuni Armenian kingdom that covered much of present-day Armenia and eastern Turkey. The iconic city was often referred to as the "City of 1,001 Churches," though the number was significantly less. To date, 50 churches, 33 cave chapels and 20 chapels have been excavated by archaeologists and historians. Ani stood on various trade routes and its many religious buildings, palaces, and sophisticated fortifications distinguished it from other contemporary urban centers in the Armenian kingdom. Among its most notable buildings was the Cathedral of Ani, which is associated with early examples of Gothic architecture and that scholars argue influenced the great cathedrals of Europe in the early gothic and Romanesque styles; its ribbed vaulting would not be seen in European cathedrals for at least another two centuries. At its height, Ani was one of the world's largest cities, with a population of perhaps 100,000, though given its limited area historians have cast doubt at this estimate.

Renowned for its splendor, Ani was sacked by the Mongols in 1236. Ani never recovered from a devastating 1319 earthquake and, more significantly, from the shifting of regional trade routes, and was abandoned by the 17th century. Ani is a widely recognized cultural, religious, and national heritage symbol for Armenians. According to Razmik Panossian, Ani is one of the most visible and 'tangible' symbols of past Armenian greatness and hence a source of pride. In 2016, it was added onto the UNESCO World Heritage List. After two decades of continuous international efforts, Ani Archaeological Site has transformed from a seat of conflict and geopolitical instability to a center of cultural tourism that might foster cultural exchange and deepening historical understanding.

== Toponym ==
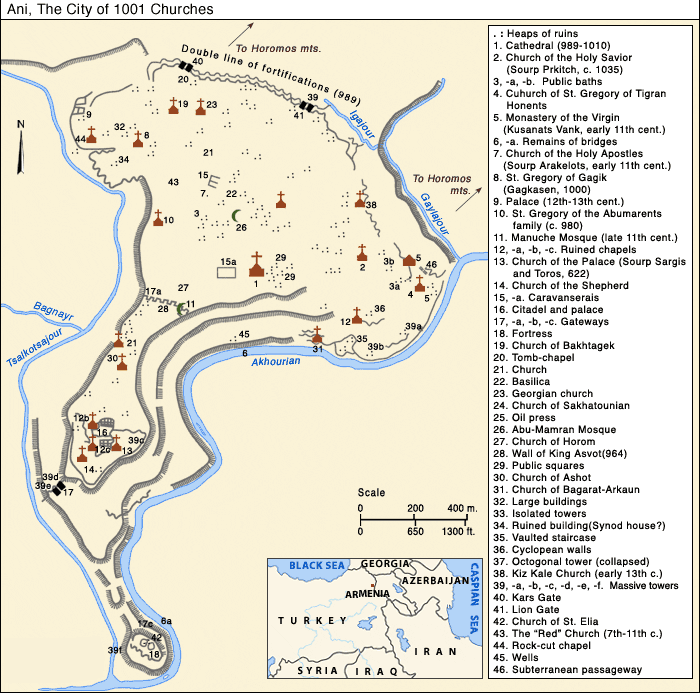
Plan of the city

The city took its name from the Armenian fortress-city and pre-Christian religious center of Ani-Kamakh located in the region of Daranaghi in Upper Armenia. Ani was also previously known as Khnamk, although historians are uncertain as to why it was called so; according to philologist and Armenologist Heinrich Hübschmann, this name has nothing to do with the ordinary Armenian verb khnamel ("to care for"). According to the second edition of the Encyclopedia of Islam: "A suggestion has been made that the town may owe its name to a temple of the Iranian goddess Anāhita (the Greek Anaďtis)". The Turkish government previously attempted to obscure the name of the town as Anı in order to give it a "more Turkish character".

== Location ==
The city is located on a triangular site, visually dramatic and naturally defensive, protected on its eastern side by the ravine of the Akhurian River and on its western side by the Bostanlar, or Tsaghkotsadzor, valley. The Akhurian is a branch of the Araks River and forms part of the currently closed border between Turkey and Armenia. The site is at an elevation of around 1,340 meters (4,400 ft).

The site is located in the Turkish province of Kars. Kars is currently an important center for local livestock trades and cheese production. It is linked by railroad with many important Turkish cities and is also considered to be an important military site due to its position near Turkey's border with Armenia. Ani is about 400 m (1,300 ft) from the Turkey-Armenia border. Across the border is the Armenian village of Kharkov, part of Shirak Province.

== History ==
Historical affiliations

Kamsarakan dynasty 5th century AD
Bagratuni Armenia 961–1045
Byzantine Empire 1045–1064
Seljuk Empire 1064–1072
Shaddadids 1072–1199
(Georgia (country)) Kingdom of Georgia 1201–1236
Zakarian Armenia 1201–1360
Kara Koyunlu 1360–1380s
Timurid Empire 1380s–1430s
Aq Qoyunlu 1430s–1500s
Safavid Iran 1500s–1579
Ottoman Empire 1579–1878
Russian Empire 1878–1918
Transcaucasian DFR 1918
Republic of Armenia 1918–1920
Ankara Government 1920–1923
Republic of Turkey 1923–present

=== Early history ===
Armenian chroniclers such as Yeghishe and Ghazar Parpetsi first mentioned Ani in the 5th century. They described it as a strong fortress built on a hilltop and a possession of the Armenian Kamsarakan dynasty.

=== Bagratuni capital ===
By the early 9th century, the former territories of the Kamsarakans in Arsharunik and Shirak (including Ani) had been incorporated into the territories of the Armenian Bagratuni dynasty. The Bagratuni dynasty was the second notable dynasty in the Armenian kingdom. They secured their independence from the Arabs near the end of the 9th century after being controlled by the Persians and Umayyad Caliphate for many years up to then. The king of Bagratuni Armenia that led to this independence was Ashot I. He had a short-lived position as the king of the Bagratuni dynasty, however, the impact of securing the freedom of the dynasty would last for many years. His son, Smbat I, ruled directly after he did. The Bagratuni territory consisted of many sub-kingdoms, the most notable of which were the Kingdom of Kars, Lori, Syunik, Artsakh, and Vaspurakan.

The Bagratuni Kingdom of Armenia, c. 1000

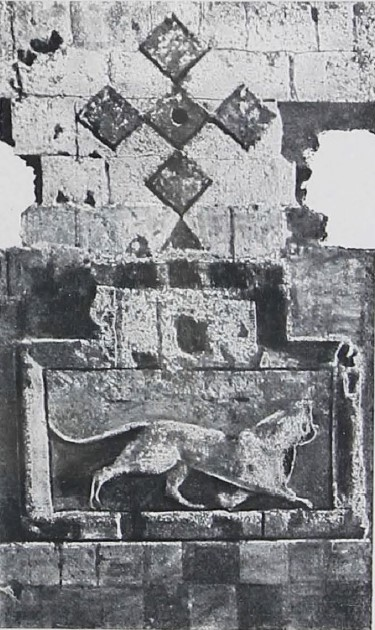
Bas-relief of a leopard with a cross above it from the gates of Ani, believed to be the symbol of the city or of the Bagratuni dynasty.

The Bagratuni dynasty patronised some of the most notable works of art and architecture in Armenia's history, one of which being the Cathedral of Ani. The leader of the Bagratuni dynasty, Ashot Msaker (Ashot the Meateater) (806–827) was given the title of ishkhan (prince) of Armenia by the Caliphate in 804. The Bagratunis had their first capital at Bagaran, some 40 km (25 mi) south of Ani, before moving it to Shirakavan, some 25 km (16 mi) northeast of Ani, and then transferring it to Kars in the year 929. In 961, king Ashot III (953–77) transferred the capital from Kars to Ani. Ani expanded rapidly during the reign of King Smbat II (977–89). In 992 the Armenian Catholicosate moved its seat to Ani. In the 10th century the population was perhaps 50,000–100,000. Scholars conventionally put the population of Ani at around 100,000. Lucy Der Manuelian noted that the figure, first reported by Matthew of Edessa, has been questioned by modern scholars, but Nikolai Marr, who excavated the site, noted that "most of the people probably lived just outside the walls." Hakob Manandyan noted that Ani's population was "unquestionably more than that of contemporary cities in Western Europe."

Ani did not lie along any previously important trade routes, but because of its size, power, and wealth it became an important trading hub. Its primary trading partners were the Byzantine Empire, the Persian Empire, the Arabs, as well as smaller nations in southern Russia and Central Asia. Its renown was such that it was known as the "city of forty gates" and the "city of a thousand and one churches." Ani also became the site of the royal mausoleum of Bagratuni kings.

Ani attained the apogee of its power during the long reign of King Gagik I (989–1020). After his death his two sons quarreled over the succession. The eldest son, Hovhannes-Smbat (1020–41), gained control of Ani while his younger brother, Ashot IV (1020–40), controlled other parts of the Bagratuni kingdom. Hovhannes-Smbat, fearing that the Byzantines would attack his now-weakened kingdom, made the Byzantine Emperor Basil II his heir. When Hovhannes-Smbat died in 1041, Emperor Michael IV the Paphlagonian, claimed sovereignty over Ani. The new king of Ani, Gagik II (1042–45), opposed this and several Byzantine armies sent to capture Ani were repulsed. However, in 1046 Ani surrendered to the Byzantines, after Gagik was invited to Constantinople and detained there, and at the instigation of pro-Byzantine elements among its population. A Byzantine governor was installed in the city.

=== Seljuks and Shaddadids ===
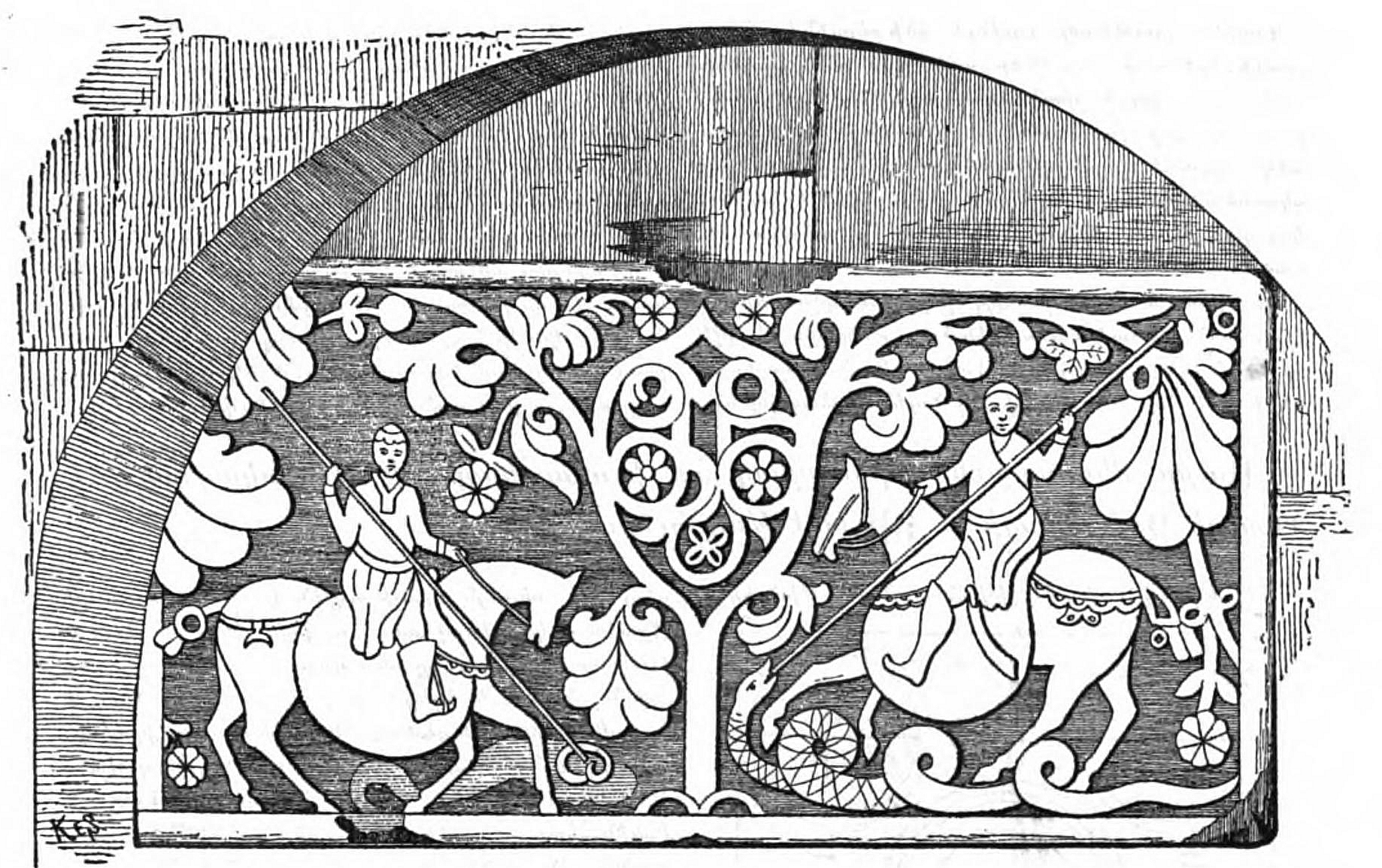
Relief from the fortress of Ani.

In 1064, a large Seljuk army under Alp Arslan attacked Ani; after a siege of 25 days, they captured the city and slaughtered its population. An account of the sack and massacres in Ani is given by the Turkish historian Sibt ibn al-Jawzi, who quotes an eyewitness saying:

The army entered the city, massacred its inhabitants, pillaged and burned it, leaving it in ruins and taking prisoner all those who remained alive...The dead bodies were so many that they blocked the streets; one could not go anywhere without stepping over them. And the number of prisoners was not less than 50,000 souls. I was determined to enter the city and see the destruction with my own eyes. I tried to find a street in which I would not have to walk over the corpses; but that was impossible.

In 1072, the Seljuks sold Ani to the Shaddadids, a Muslim Kurdish dynasty. The Shaddadids generally pursued a conciliatory policy towards the city's overwhelmingly Armenian and Christian population and married several members of the Bagratuni nobility. Whenever the Shaddadid governance became too intolerant, however, the population would appeal to the Christian Kingdom of Georgia for help. The Georgians captured Ani five times between 1124 and 1209: in 1124, 1161, 1174, and 1199. The first three times, it was recaptured by the Shaddadids.

=== Revival under the Zakarians ===
In 1199, Queen Tamar of the Georgian Bagrationis captured Ani and in 1201 granted the governorship of the city to the generals Zakare and Ivane. Supported by Tamar, Zakare's new dynasty — the Zakarians — considered themselves to be the successors to the Armenian Bagratunis. Prosperity quickly returned to Ani during the Georgian Golden Age. The city's defences were strengthened and many new churches were constructed.

Zakare was succeeded by his son Shahnshah. In 1217 and 1220, the city came under attack from the Seljuk Sultanate of Rum whose forces destroyed and pillaged the city however they did not occupy it.

=== Mongol capture and decline ===
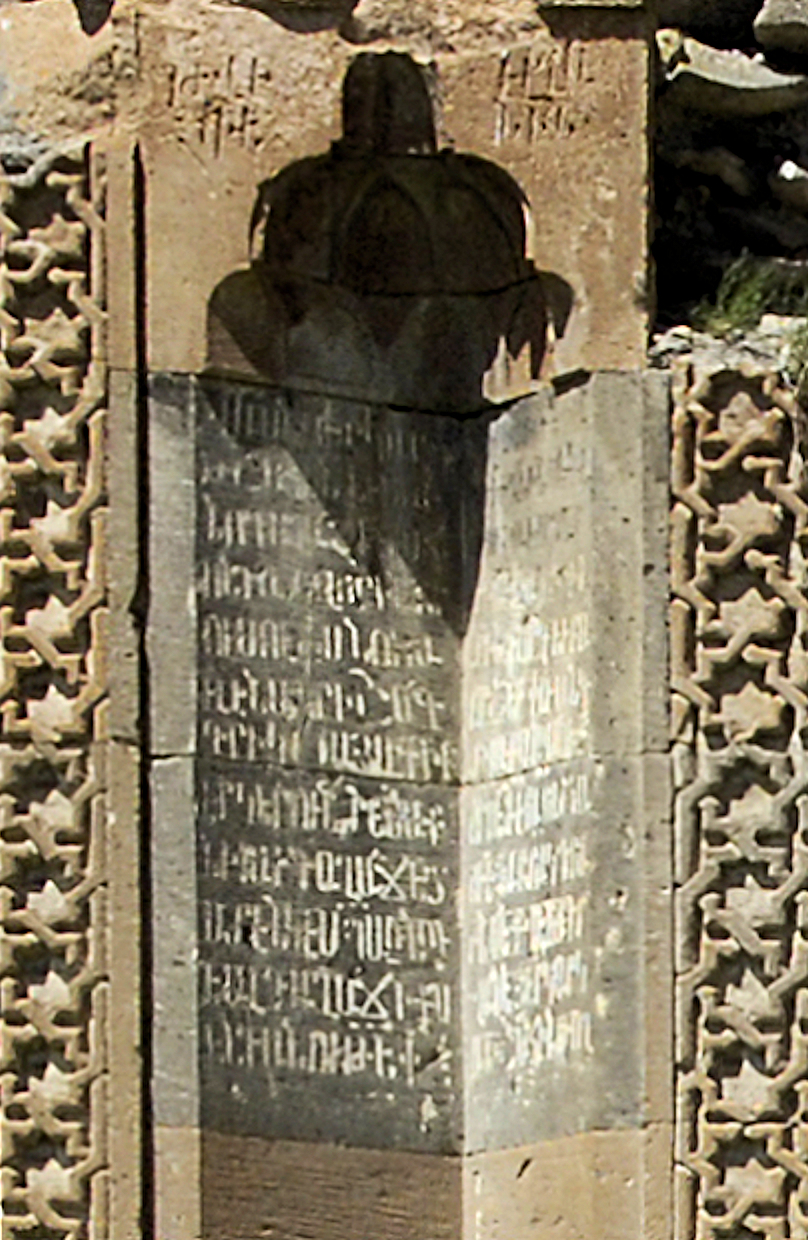
Tax charter of the Mongol Il-Khanate, in the Armenian language. Church of the Holy Apostles (arabesque gavit), 1276.

The Mongols unsuccessfully besieged Ani in 1226, but in 1236 they captured and sacked the city, massacring large numbers of its population. During Mongol invasion of Georgia in 1238-39 Queen Rusudan had to evacuate Tbilisi for Kutaisi, leaving eastern Georgia in the hands of atabeg Avag Zakarian, Shahnshah Zakarian, and Kakhetian lord, Egarslan Bakurtsikheli. The Mongol general Toghta was sent by Chaghatai to assault Avag's troops at the fortress of Kayan. After some resistance, Avag surrendered, and had to agree to pay tribute to the Mongols, and to provide troops to join the Mongol army. The combined troops went on to Ani, the Armenian capital being defended by Shahnshah Zakarian, but the city was eventually captured and destroyed. Following this disastrous campaign of 1238–1239, the Armenians and Georgians made peace with the Mongols and agreed to pay them tribute and supply them with troops.

Ilkhanid rule continued uninterrupted until the death of the last Ilkhanid emperor Abu Sa'id Bahadur Khan in 1335. Following the decline of the Il-Khanate, during the later part of the reign of George V (between 1319 and 1335) and the reign of the later king Bagrat V, the city of Ani again became part of the Kingdom of Georgia. From 1335, various Mongol factions vied for power, successively occupying Zakarid Armenia and minting their coinage in Ani, while maintaining effective control on the Kingdom of Georgia. First were the Jalayirid Muhammad Khan, followed by the Chobanids with their puppet rulers Suleiman Khan and Anushirwan, again followed by the Turco-Mongol Jalayirids. The Jalayirids ruled Armenia until the conquests of Timur from 1386.

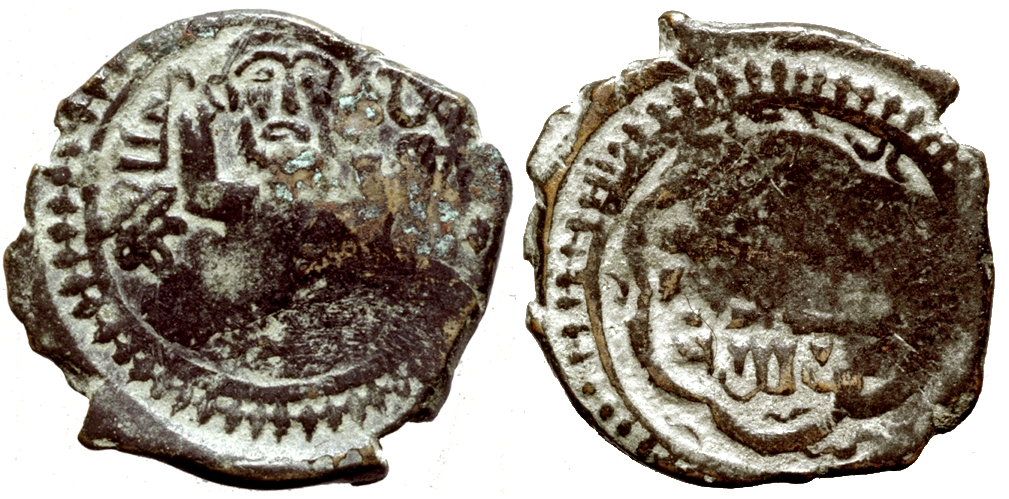
Copper Alloy Fals of Sulayman Khan, with orans figure. Ani mint, (1339–1343)

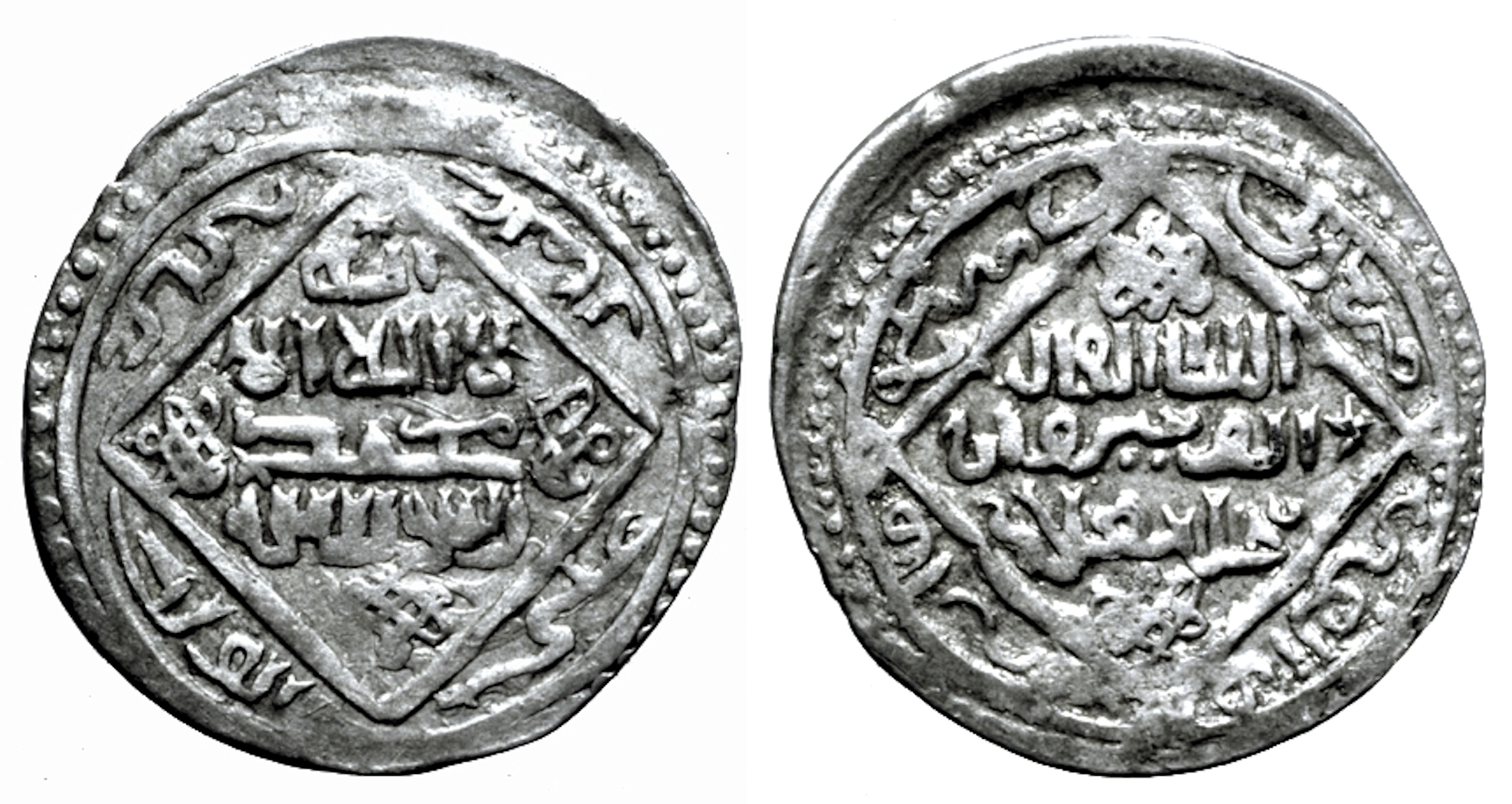
Silver Dirham of Anushirwan, Ani mint, 747 H (1346–1347)

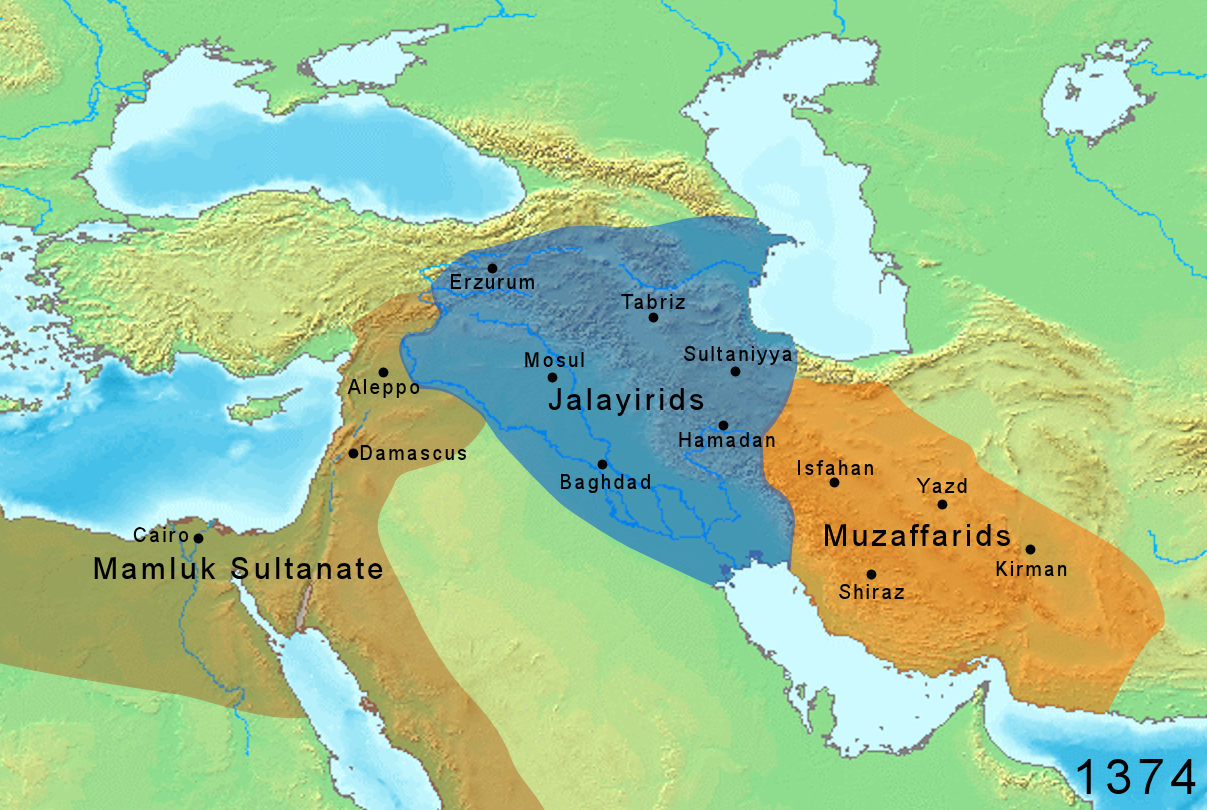
Extent of Jalayirid territory in 1374 ( )

Between 1386 and 1404, the Turco-Mongol forces of Timur raided the countries of Transcaucasia from their bases in northern Iran. Tiflis was finally conquered by Timur in 1404, and King George VII was forced to recognize Timurid suzerainty. Armenia too, which had been under Mongol Jalayirid control, was incorporated into the Timurid realm. Tamerlane captured Ani in the 1380s. On his death the Kara Koyunlu gained control and made Ani their capital, but transferred their capital to Yerevan. In 1441 the Armenian Catholicosate did the same.

The Persian Safavids then ruled Ani until it became part of the Turkish Ottoman Empire in 1579. A small town remained within its walls at least until the middle of the seventeenth century, but the site was entirely abandoned by 1735 when the last monks left the monastery in the Virgin's Fortress or Kizkale.

=== Modern times ===
"Of true Armenian architecture the finest and most characteristic specimens are to be found in the ruined city of Ani..."

— James Bryce, 1876

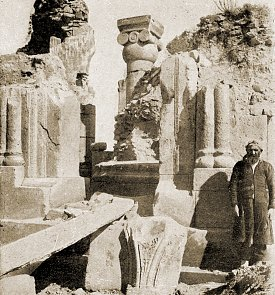
In 1905–06, archaeological excavations of the church of Saint Gregory of King Gagik were undertaken, headed by Nikolai Marr.

In the first half of the 19th century, European travelers discovered Ani for the outside world, publishing their descriptions in academic journals and travel accounts. The private buildings were little more than heaps of stones but grand public buildings and the city's double wall were preserved and reckoned to present "many points of great architectural beauty". Ohannes Kurkdjian produced a stereoscopic image of Ani in the second half of the 19th century.

In 1878, the Ottoman Empire's Kars region—including Ani—was incorporated into the Russian Empire's Transcaucasia region. In 1892 the first archaeological excavations were conducted at Ani, sponsored by the St. Petersburg Academy of Sciences and supervised by the Georgian archaeologist and orientalist Nicholas Marr (1864–1934). Marr's excavations at Ani resumed in 1904 and continued yearly until 1917. Large sectors of the city were professionally excavated, numerous buildings were uncovered and measured, the finds were studied and published in academic journals, guidebooks for the monuments and the museum were written, and the whole site was surveyed for the first time. Emergency repairs were also undertaken on those buildings that were most at risk of collapse. A museum was established to house the tens of thousands of items found during the excavations. This museum was housed in two buildings: the Minuchihr mosque, and a purpose-built stone building. Armenians from neighboring villages and towns also began to visit the city on a regular basis, and there was even talk by Marr's team of building a school for educating the local Armenian children, building parks, and planting trees to beautify the site.

In 1918, during the latter stages of World War I, the armies of the Ottoman Empire were fighting their way across the territory of the newly declared Republic of Armenia, capturing Kars in April 1918. At Ani, attempts were made to evacuate the artifacts contained in the museum as Turkish soldiers were approaching the site. About 6,000 of the most portable items were removed by archaeologist Ashkharbek Kalantar, a participant of Marr's excavation campaigns. At the behest of Joseph Orbeli, the saved items were consolidated into a museum collection; they are currently part of the collection of the History Museum of Armenia in Yerevan. Everything that was left behind was later looted or destroyed.

Turkey's surrender at the end of World War I briefly led to the restoration of Ani to Armenian jurisdiction. However, a resumed offensive against the Armenian Republic in 1920 by Mustafa Kemal Atatürk resulted in Turkey's recapture of Ani. At the negotiations for the Treaty of Alexandropol, Armenian Prime Minister Alexander Khatisian "attempted futilely" to persuade Turkish commander Kâzım Karabekir to leave Ani under Armenian control, but Karabekir refused. In March 1921, the signing of the Treaty of Moscow formalized the incorporation of the territory containing Ani into the Republic of Turkey.

In May 1921, Turkish government minister Rıza Nur ordered Karabekir to wipe the monuments of Ani "off the face of the earth." Karabekir claimed in his memoirs that he vigorously rejected this command and never carried it out. However, some destruction did occur, including most of Marr's excavations and building repairs. In October of the same year, the Treaty of Kars was signed between Turkey and the Russian SFSR, confirming the border established in the Treaty of Moscow. During the treaty discussions, the Soviet side sought to renegotiate the status of Ani and keep it as part of Soviet Armenia, but the Turkish side did not agree.

As part of the Kars region, Ani was among the territories claimed by the USSR from Turkey following World War II. After Turkey joined the NATO alliance in 1952, the ruined city became part of the East-West front line in the Cold War. According to Christopher J. Walker, there were negotiations between the USSR and Turkey in 1968 on transferring Ani to Soviet Armenia in exchange for "one or two Azeri villages in the region of Mount Akbaba." However, according to Walker, nothing resulted from these talks. Throughout the Cold War, and until 2004, a permit from the Turkish Ministry of Culture was required to visit Ani. At one point in the 1980s, photography was banned, as the site lay on the Soviet-Turkish border.

=== Since 1991 ===
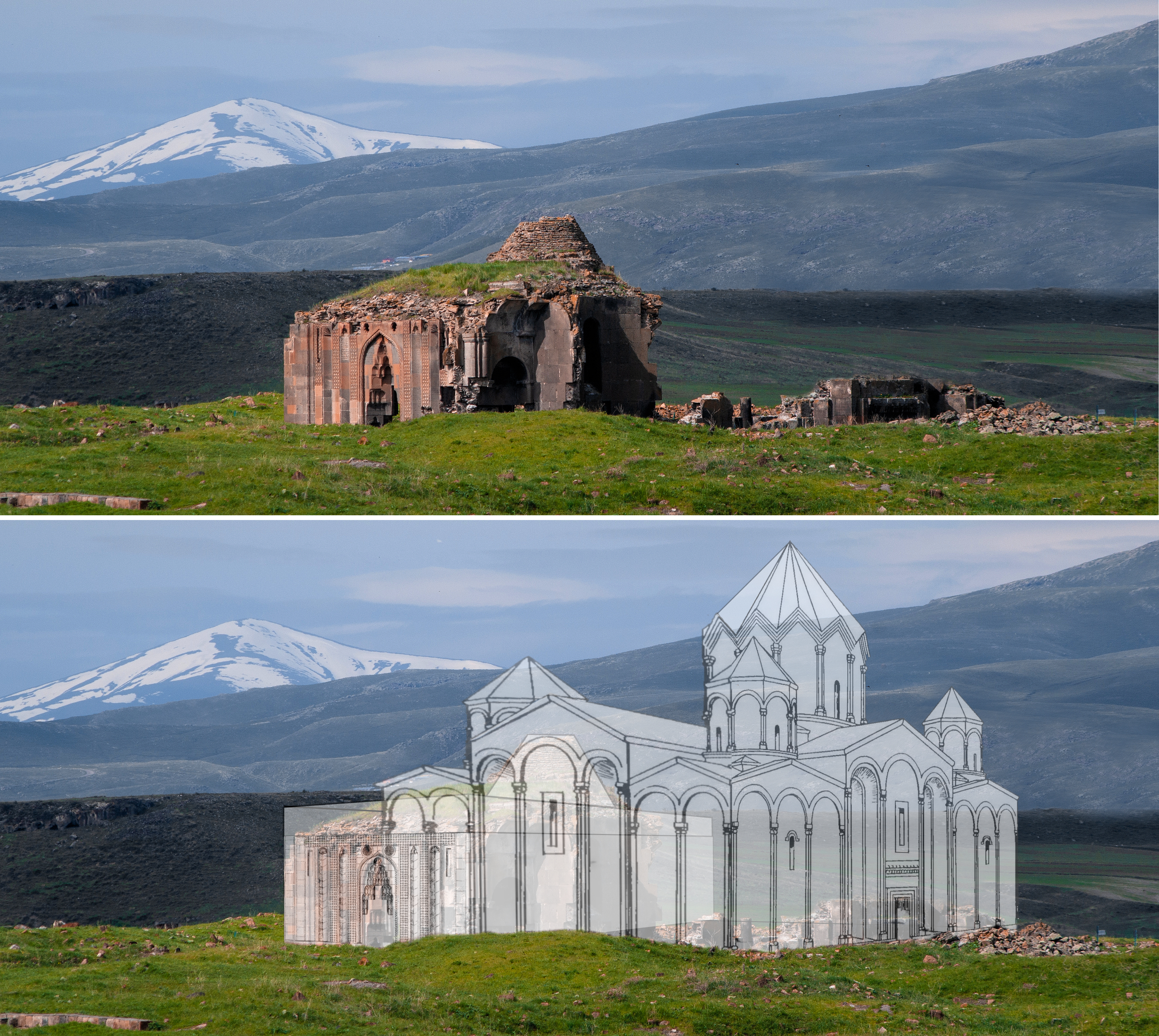
Church of the Holy Apostles (1031–1215). Top: current ruins (Seljuk gavit to the left, ruins of the Armenian church to the right). Bottom: reconstruction.

After the dissolution of the Soviet Union in 1991, Ani formed part of the border between Turkey and the independent Republic of Armenia. Today, according to Lonely Planet and Frommer's travel guides to Turkey:

Official permission to visit Ani is no longer needed. Just go to Ani and buy a ticket. If you don't have your own car, haggle with a taxi or minibus driver in Kars for the round-trip to Ani, perhaps sharing the cost with other travelers. If you have trouble, the Tourist Office may help. Plan to spend at least a half-day at Ani. It's not a bad idea to bring a picnic lunch and a water bottle.

From the Armenian side of the border, in Shirak Province, an observation post has been set up near the village of Haykadzor, complete with an information panel, but the view is very poor. The outpost of Kharkov offers an excellent view, but access is restricted by border troops and Russian military personnel. Permission to visit is granted at the Ministry of Foreign Affairs in Yerevan for free and takes one week.

According to The Economist, Armenians have "accused the Turks of neglecting the place in a spirit of chauvinism. The Turks retort that Ani's remains have been shaken by blasts from a quarry on the Armenian side of the border." Another commentator said: "Ani is now a ghost city, uninhabited for over three centuries and marooned inside a Turkish military zone on Turkey's decaying closed border with the modern Republic of Armenia. Ani's recent history has been one of continuous and always increasing destruction. Neglect, earthquakes, cultural cleansing, vandalism, quarrying, amateurish restorations and excavations – all these and more have taken a heavy toll on Ani's monuments."

In the estimation of the Landmarks Foundation (a non-profit organization established for the protection of sacred sites) this ancient city "needs to be protected regardless of whose jurisdiction it falls under. Earthquakes in 1319, 1832, and 1988, all have had devastating effects on the architecture of the city. The city of Ani is a sacred place which needs ongoing protection." In an October 2010 report titled Saving Our Vanishing Heritage, Global Heritage Fund identified Ani as one of 12 worldwide sites most "On the Verge" of irreparable loss and destruction, citing insufficient management and looting as primary causes.

The World Monuments Fund (WMF) placed Ani on its 1996, 1998, and 2000 Watch Lists of 100 Most Endangered Sites. In May 2011, WMF announced it was beginning conservation work on the cathedral and Church of the Holy Redeemer in partnership with the Turkish Ministry of Culture. In 2023, with the support of the WMF and the Calouste Gulbenkian Foundation, Anadolu Kültür brought together experts from worldwide to launch a mobile application which allows virtual exploration of Ani.

== UNESCO World Heritage Site ==
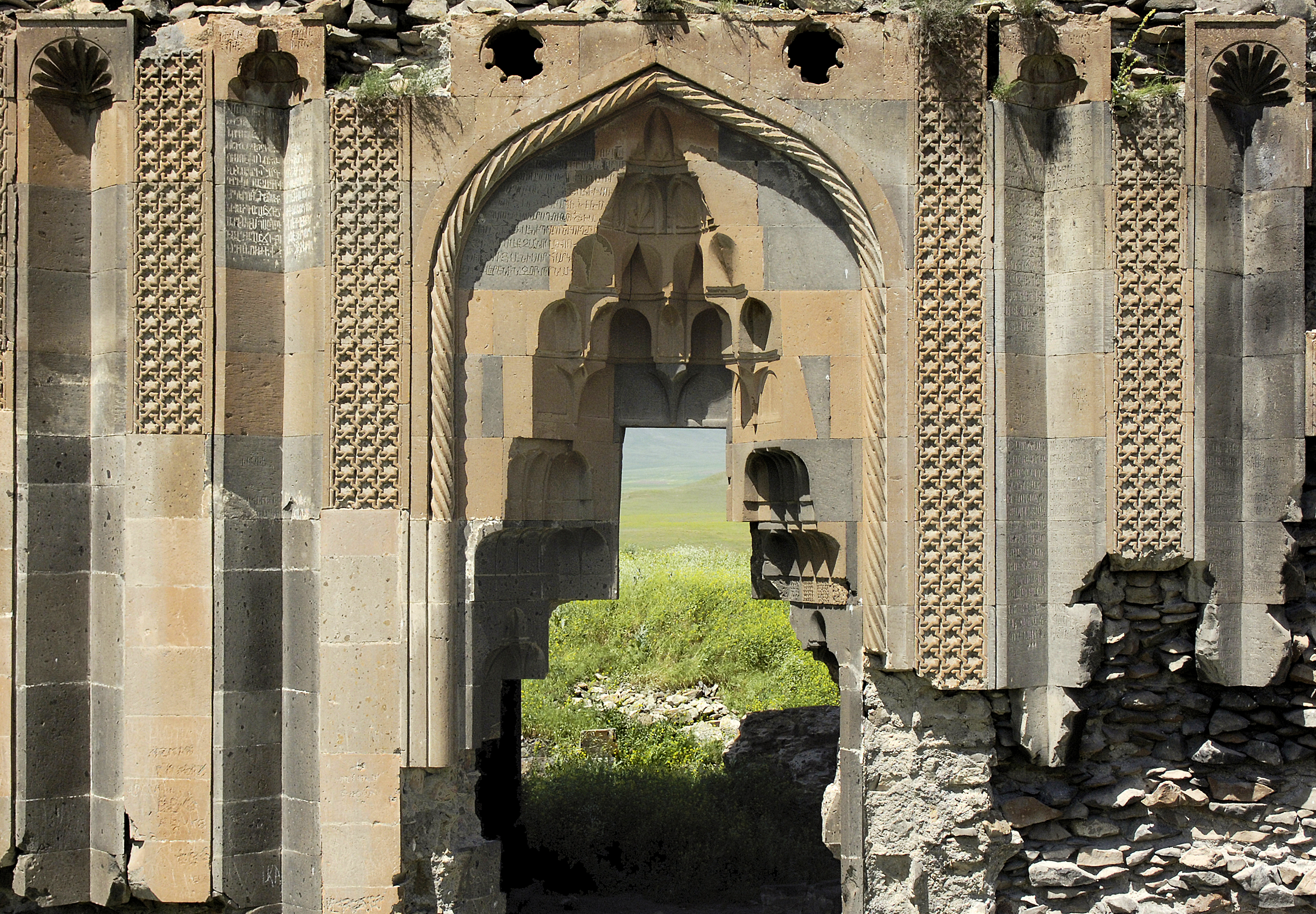
Seljuk style Muqarnas at the Church of the Holy Apostles. This design is similar to the tomb of Mama Hatun at Tercan, c.1200.

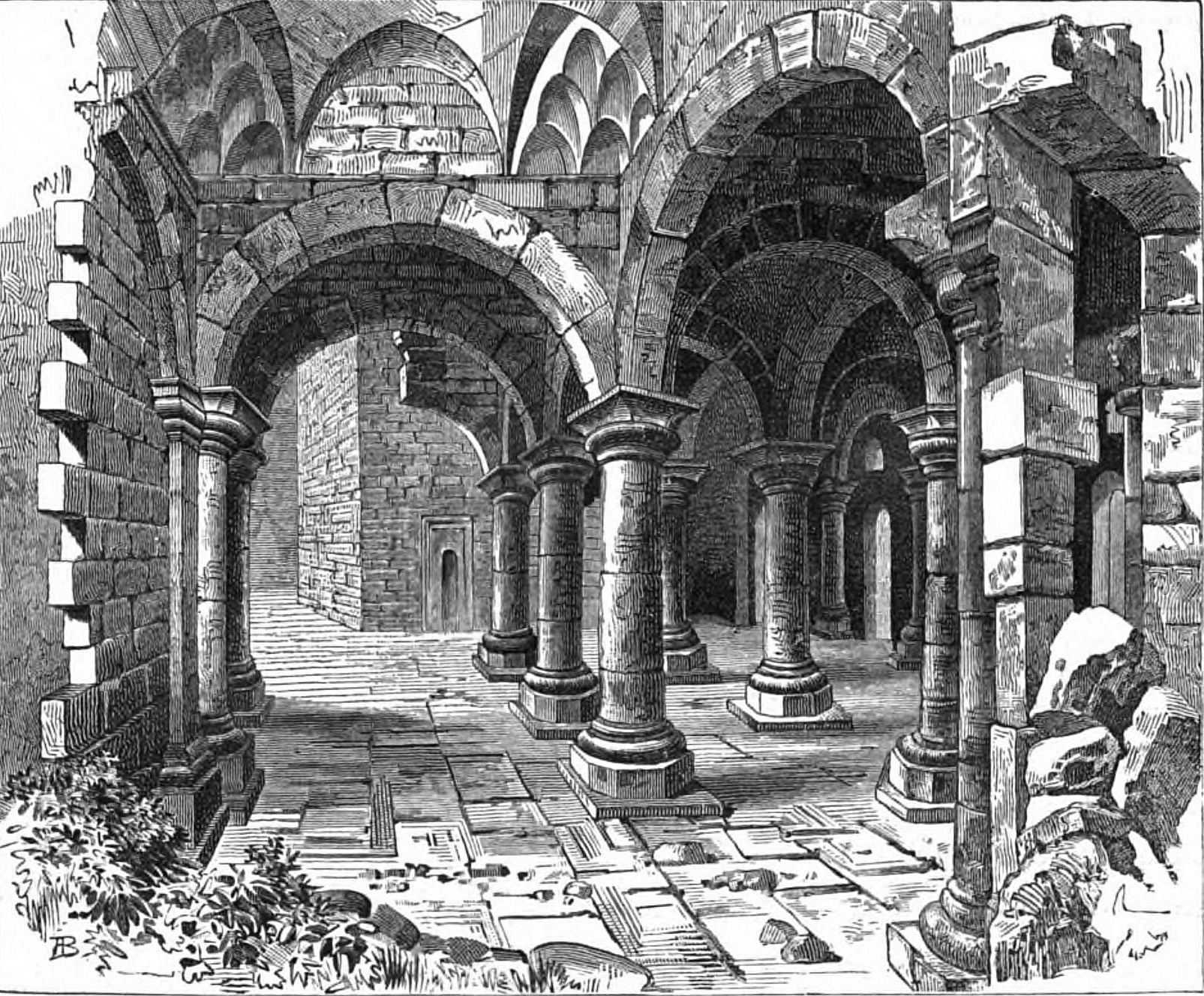
Menucihr Mosque, inside in 1881.

In March 2015, it was reported that Turkey will nominate Ani to be listed as a UNESCO World Heritage Site in 2016. The archaeological site of Ani was inscribed as a UNESCO World Heritage Site on July 15, 2016. According to art historian Heghnar Zeitlian Watenpaugh the addition "would secure significant benefits in protection, research expertise, and funding." It gained this status due to its amazing representation of medieval Armenian architecture, however, there were three main criteria that further explain why this aspect of Ani is significant. The first of these criteria is that "Ani was a meeting place for Armenian, Georgian, and diverse Islamic cultural traditions that were reflected in the architectural design, material, and decorative details of the monuments". Ani's location on the silk road brought in many visitors from various parts of the world, these visitors brought with them new cultures and architectural styles. This unique combination of residents in the city led many of the buildings in Ani to have a never-before-seen architectural style that is distinct to this region of the world.

This new style, formed when Ani was at its prime, still has a large impact on the current architecture in its region. The second criterion that caused Ani to gain the status of "outstanding universal value" from UNESCO is the fact that "Ani bears exceptional testimony to Armenian cultural, artistic, architectural, and urban design development and it is an extremely extraordinary representation of Armenian religious architecture known as the 'Ani school', reflecting its techniques, style, and material characteristics". Ani's architecture is an important reminder to the citizens of Armenia of their past. Its buildings have beautiful stone working and architectural designs that were very ahead of their time, this is a major source of pride for the Armenian people. The third criterion that gained Ani the right to be protected is that "Ani offers a wide panorama of medieval architectural development thanks to the presence at the site of almost all the architectural types that emerged in the region in the course of six centuries from 7th to 13th centuries AD". This is due to the cities "military, religious, and civil buildings". UNESCO states that Ani "is also considered a rare settlement", this is because many different styles of Armenian churches can be seen throughout the city, the styles of these churches were developed between the 4th and 8th century AD.

Ani is currently classified by UNESCO as a 1st degree archaeological conservation site. This range of protection is continually being enlarged by UNESCO, however, as even Ani's surrounding areas are classified as 3rd-degree archaeological conservation sites. The Ministry of Culture and Tourism is the main organization in charge of the conservation of Ani, however, the General Directorate of Cultural Heritage and Museums also participates in helping with tasks such as restoration. There are also some other local branches in charge of some of the conservation efforts.

When inscribing Ani Archaeological Site on the UNESCO World Heritage List, the 40th Session of the World Heritage Committee Member States highlighted: "…...the cosmopolitan setting of medieval Ani is a potential model for the improvement of the contemporary international relations in the region, starting from the involvement of the international community in the efforts to preserve this exceptional multi-cultural archaeological site."

== Monuments ==
All the structures at Ani are constructed using the local volcanic basalt, a sort of tufa stone. It is easily carved and comes in a variety of vibrant colors, from creamy yellow, to rose-red, to jet black. Throughout the attacks and natural disasters Ani has faced, all of the buildings have at least significant structural damage or have been completely destroyed. The most important surviving monuments are:

=== The Cathedral ===
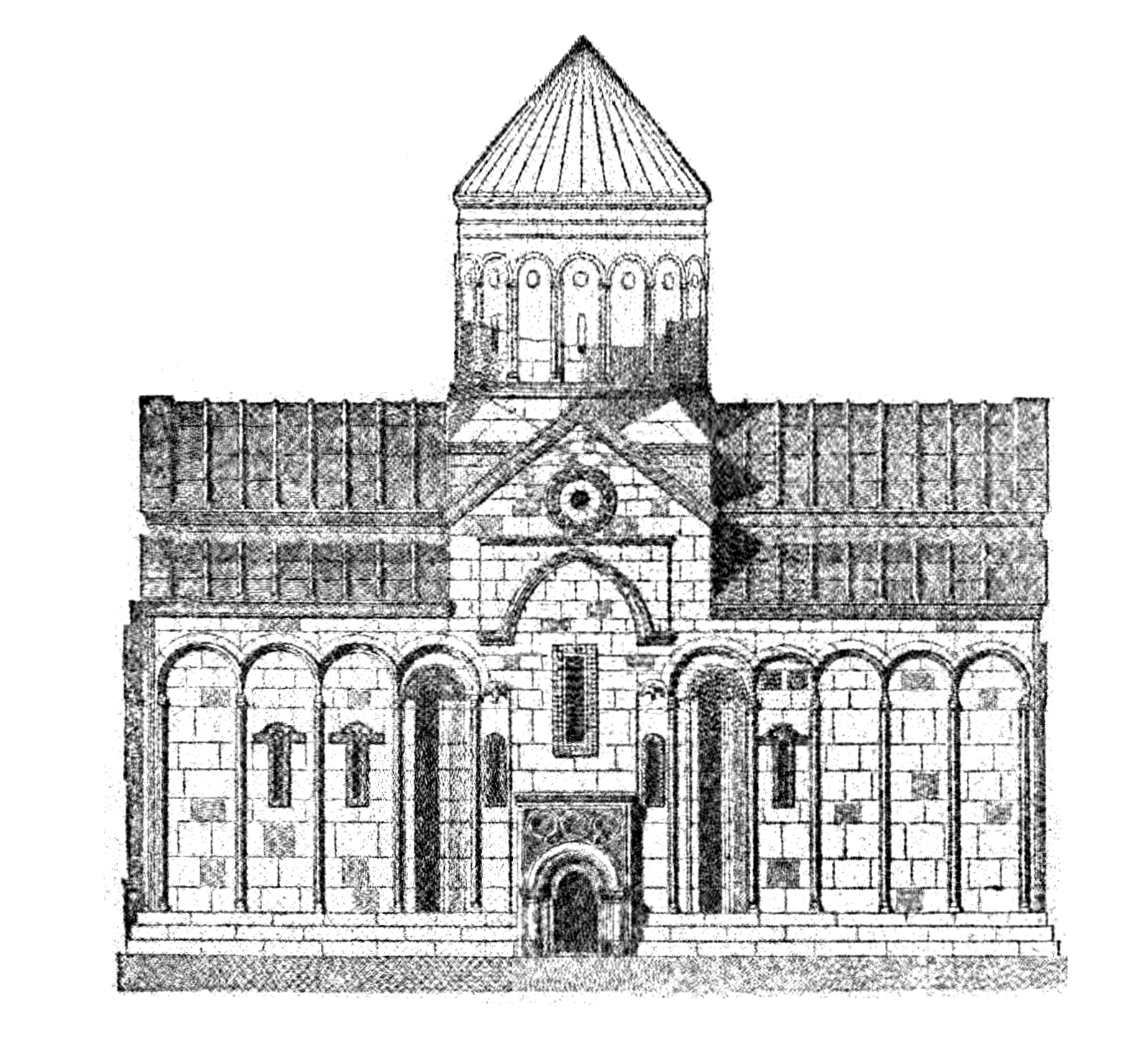
Cathedral of Ani, reconstruction.

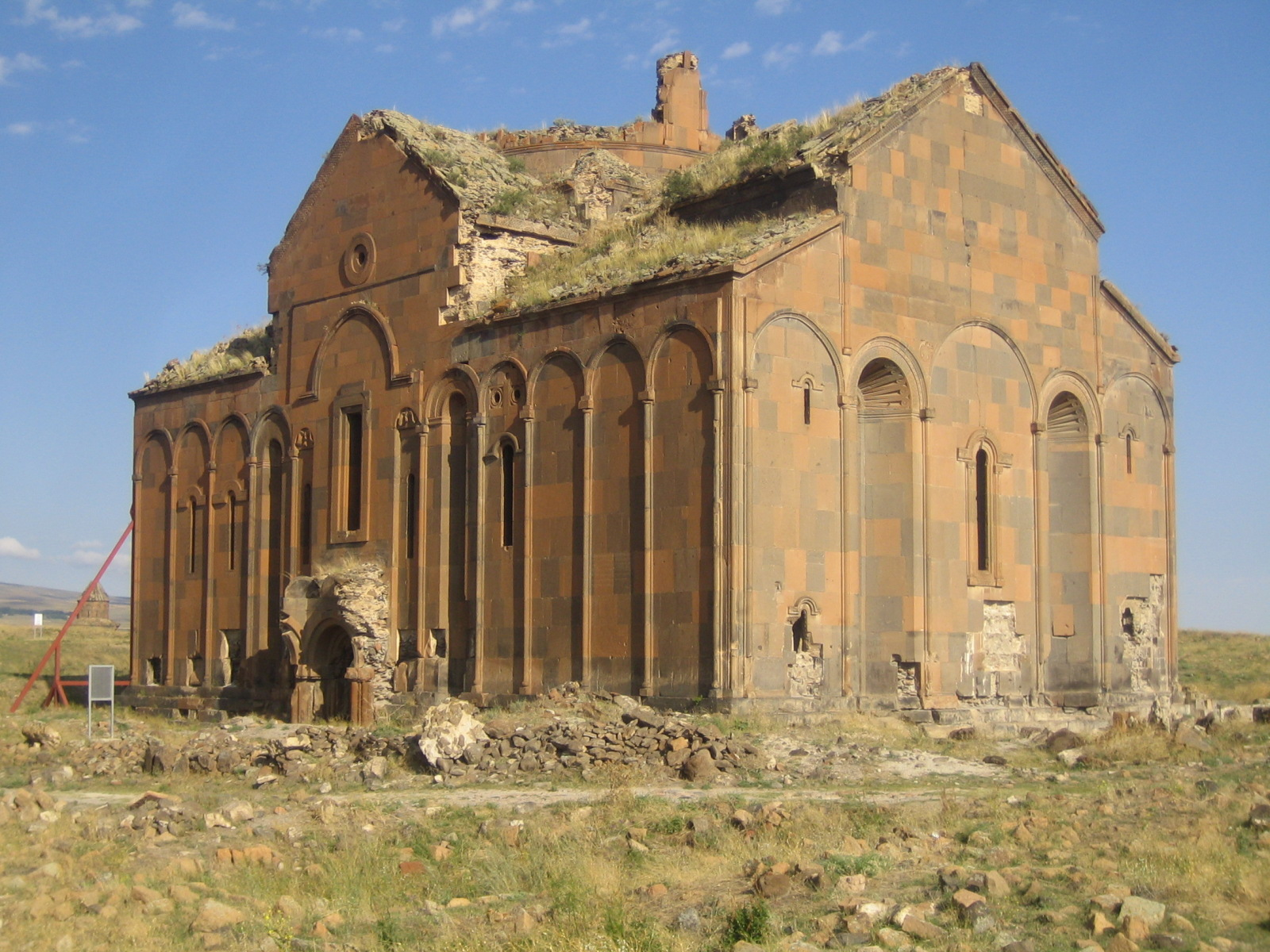
Cathedral of Ani today

Also known as Surp Asdvadzadzin (the Church of the Holy Mother of God), its construction was started in the year 989, under King Smbat II. Work was halted after his death, and was only finished in 1001 (or in 1010 under another reading of its building inscription). The design of the cathedral was the work of Trdat, the most celebrated architect of medieval Armenia. The cathedral is a domed basilica (the dome collapsed in 1319). The interior contains several progressive features (such as the use of pointed arches and clustered piers) that give to it the appearance of Gothic architecture (a style which the Ani cathedral predates by several centuries).

=== The church of St Gregory of Tigran Honents ===
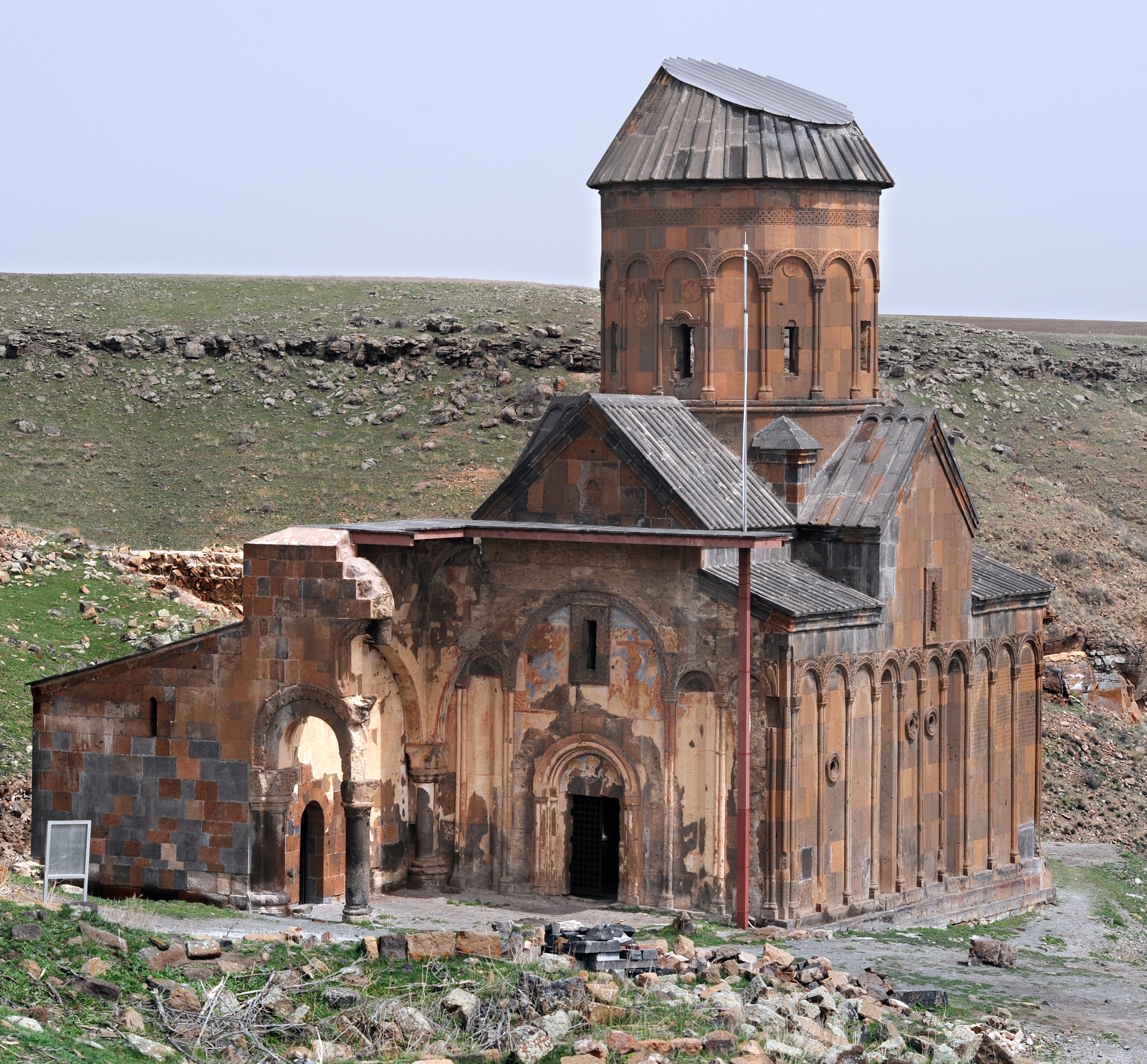
The church of St Gregory of Tigran Honents

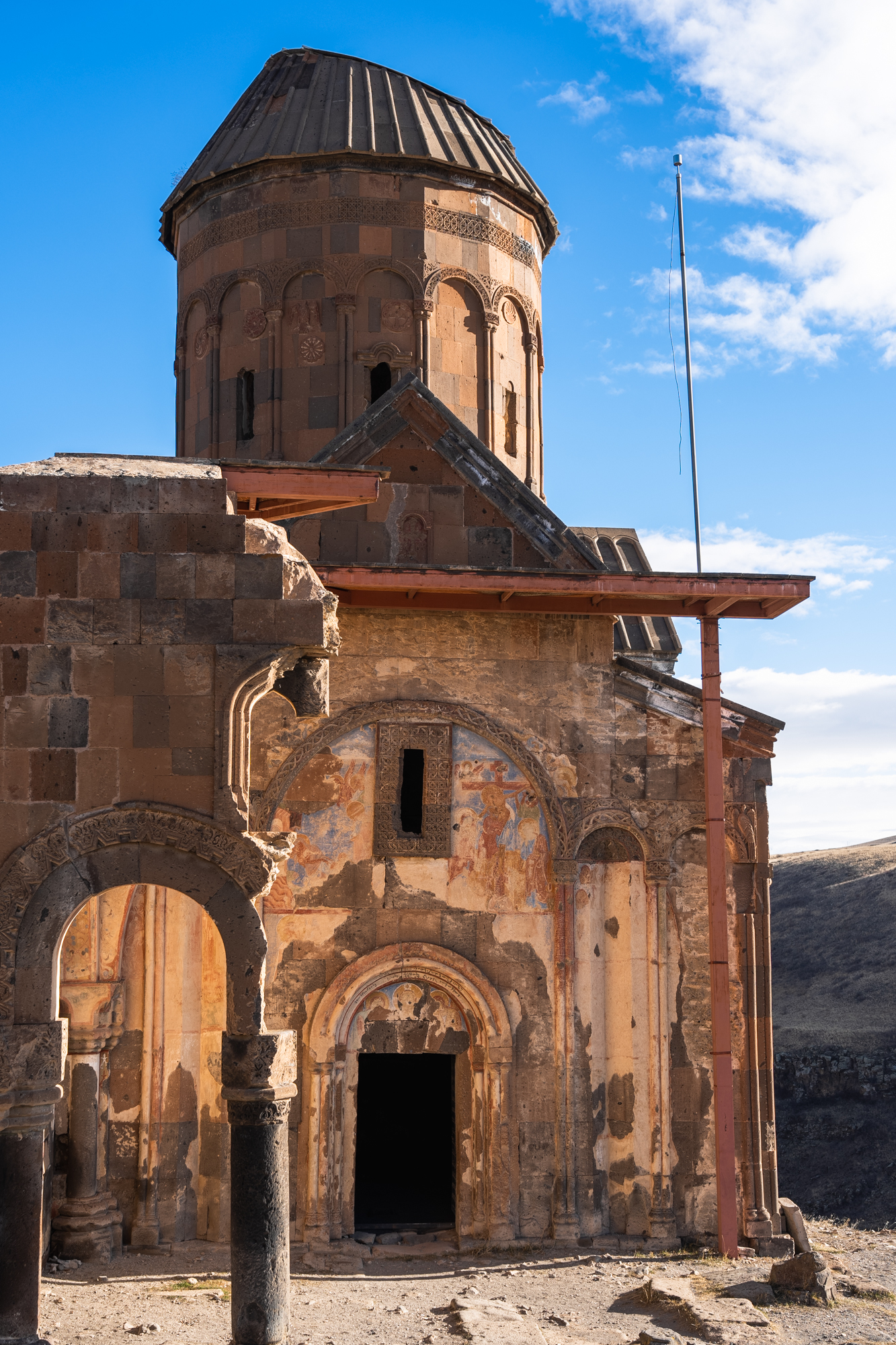
Entrance to the church of St. Gregory of Tigran Honents

This church, finished in 1215, is the best-preserved monument at Ani. It was built during the rule of the Zakarians and was commissioned by the wealthy Armenian merchant Tigran Honents. Its plan is of a type called a domed hall. In front of its entrance are the ruins of a narthex and a small chapel that are from a slightly later period. The exterior of the church is spectacularly decorated. Ornate stone carvings of real and imaginary animals fill the spandrels between blind arcade that runs around all four sides of the church. The interior contains an important and unique series of frescoes cycles that depict two main themes. In the eastern third of the church is depicted the Life of Saint Gregory the Illuminator, in the middle third of the church is depicted the Life of Christ. Such extensive fresco cycles are rare features in Armenian architecture – it is believed that these ones were executed by Georgian artists, and the cycle also includes scenes from the life of St. Nino, who converted the Georgians to Christianity. In the narthex and its chapel survive fragmentary frescoes that are more Byzantine in style.

=== The church of the Holy Redeemer ===
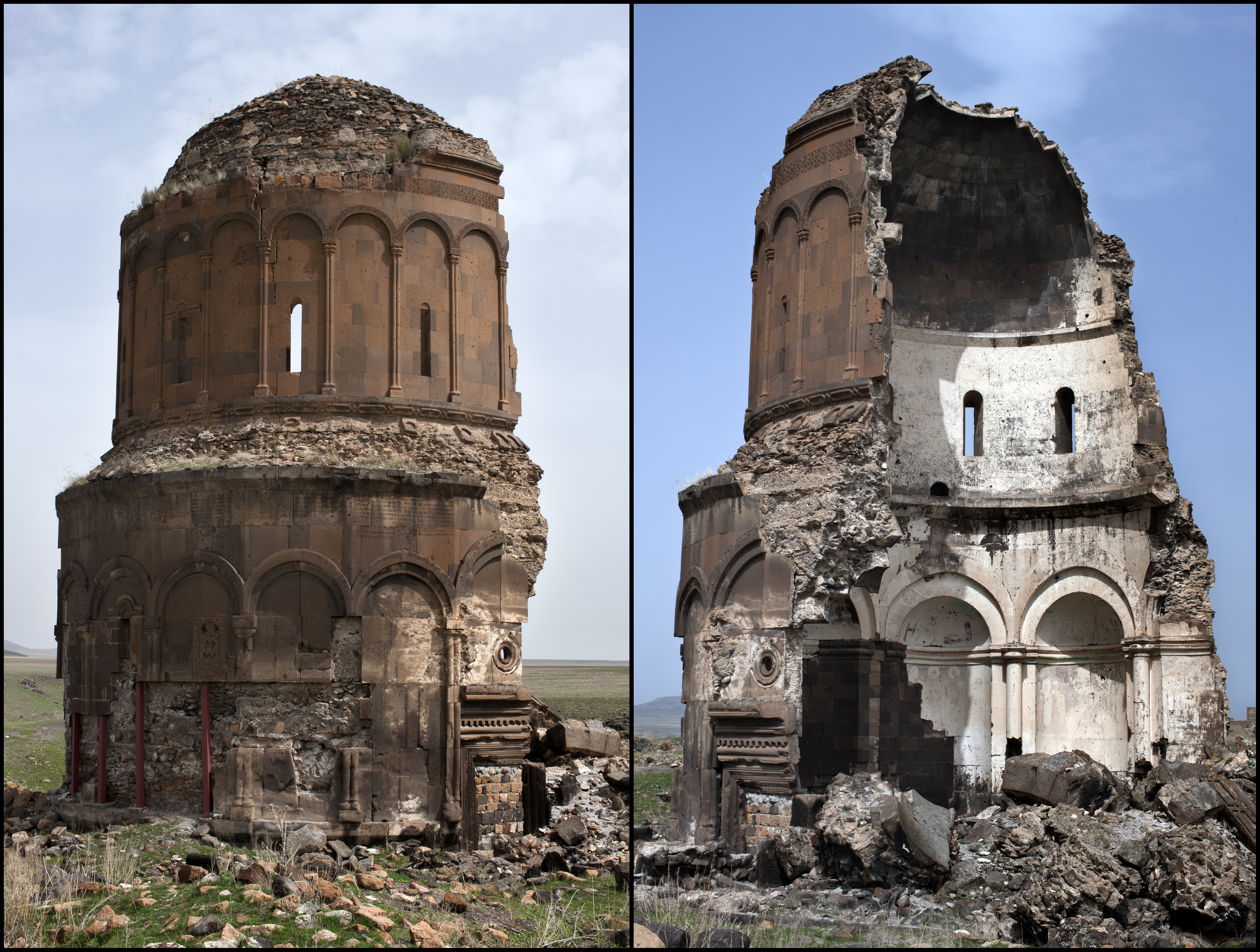
The Church of the Redeemer (Surb Prkich) from two angles: west and east

This church was completed shortly after the year 1035. It had a unique design: 19-sided externally, 8-apsed internally, with a huge central dome set upon a tall drum. It was built by Prince Ablgharib Pahlavid to house a fragment of the True Cross. The church was largely intact until 1955, when the entire eastern half collapsed during a storm.

=== The church of St Gregory of the Abughamrents ===
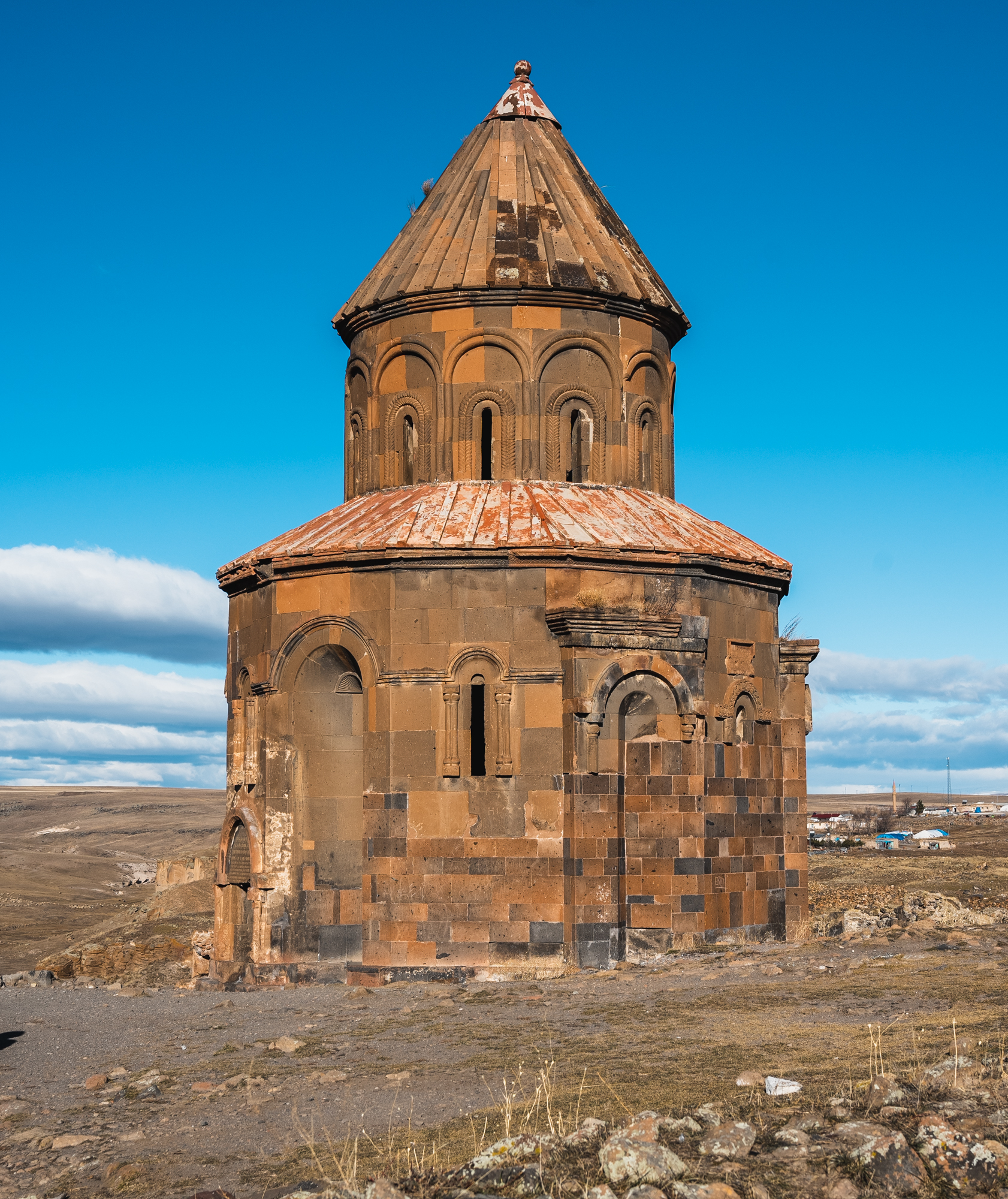
The church of St. Gregory of the Abughamrents after restoration.

This small building probably dates from the late 10th century. It was built as a private chapel for the Pahlavuni family. Their mausoleum, built in 1040 and now reduced to its foundations, was constructed against the northern side of the church. The church has a centralised plan, with a dome over a drum, and the interior has six exedera.

=== King Gagik's church of St Gregory ===
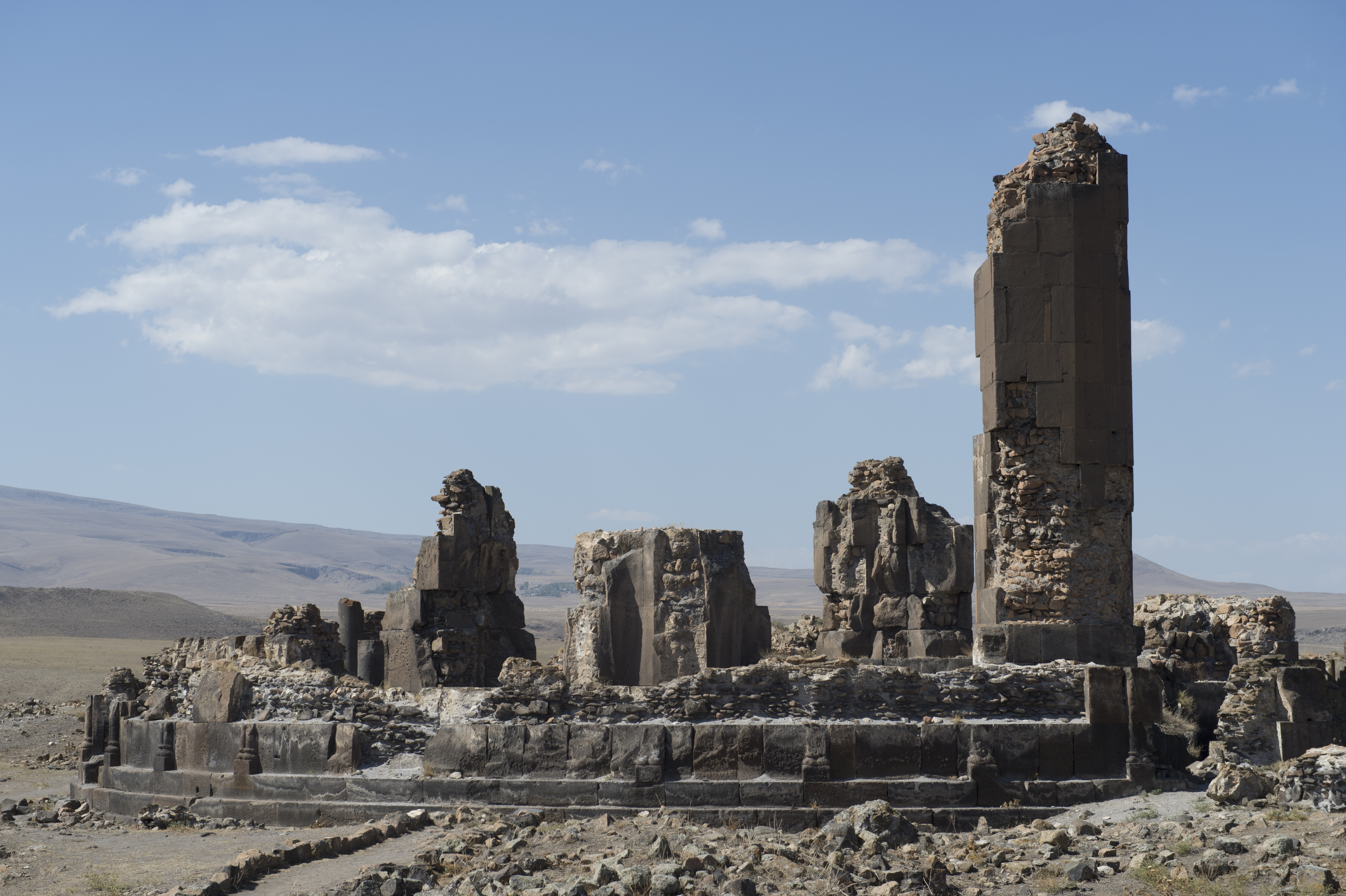
King Gagik's church of St Gregory

Also known as the Gagikashen, this church was constructed between the years 1001 and 1005 and intended to be a recreation of the celebrated cathedral of Zvartnots at Vagharshapat. Nikolai Marr uncovered the foundations of this remarkable building in 1905 and 1906. Before that, all that was visible on the site was a huge earthen mound. The designer of the church was the architect Trdat. The church is known to have collapsed a relatively short time after its construction and houses were later constructed on top of its ruins. Trdat's design closely follows that of Zvartnotz in its size and in its plan (a quatrefoil core surrounded by a circular ambulatory).

=== The Church of the Holy Apostles ===
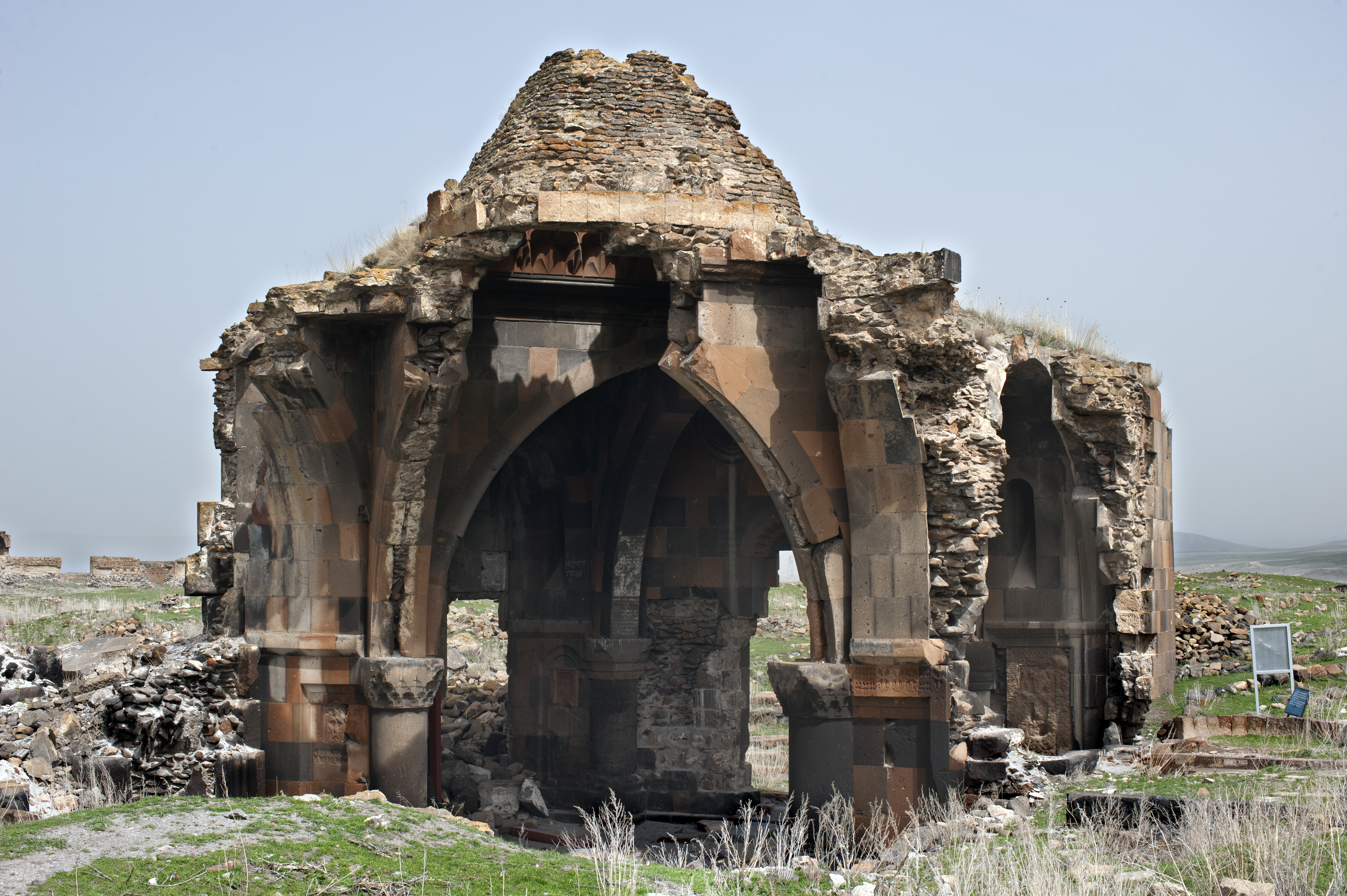
The Church of the Holy Apostles

The date of its construction is not known, but the earliest dated inscription on its walls is from 1031. It was founded by the Pahlavuni family and was used by the archbishops of Ani (many of whom belonged to that dynasty). It has a plan of a type called an inscribed quatrefoil with corner chambers. Only fragments remain of the church, but a narthex with spectacular stonework, built against the south side of the church, is still partially intact. It dates from the early 13th century. A number of other halls, chapels, and shrines once surrounded this church: Nicholas Marr excavated their foundations in 1909, but they are now mostly destroyed.

=== Surp Stephanos Church ===
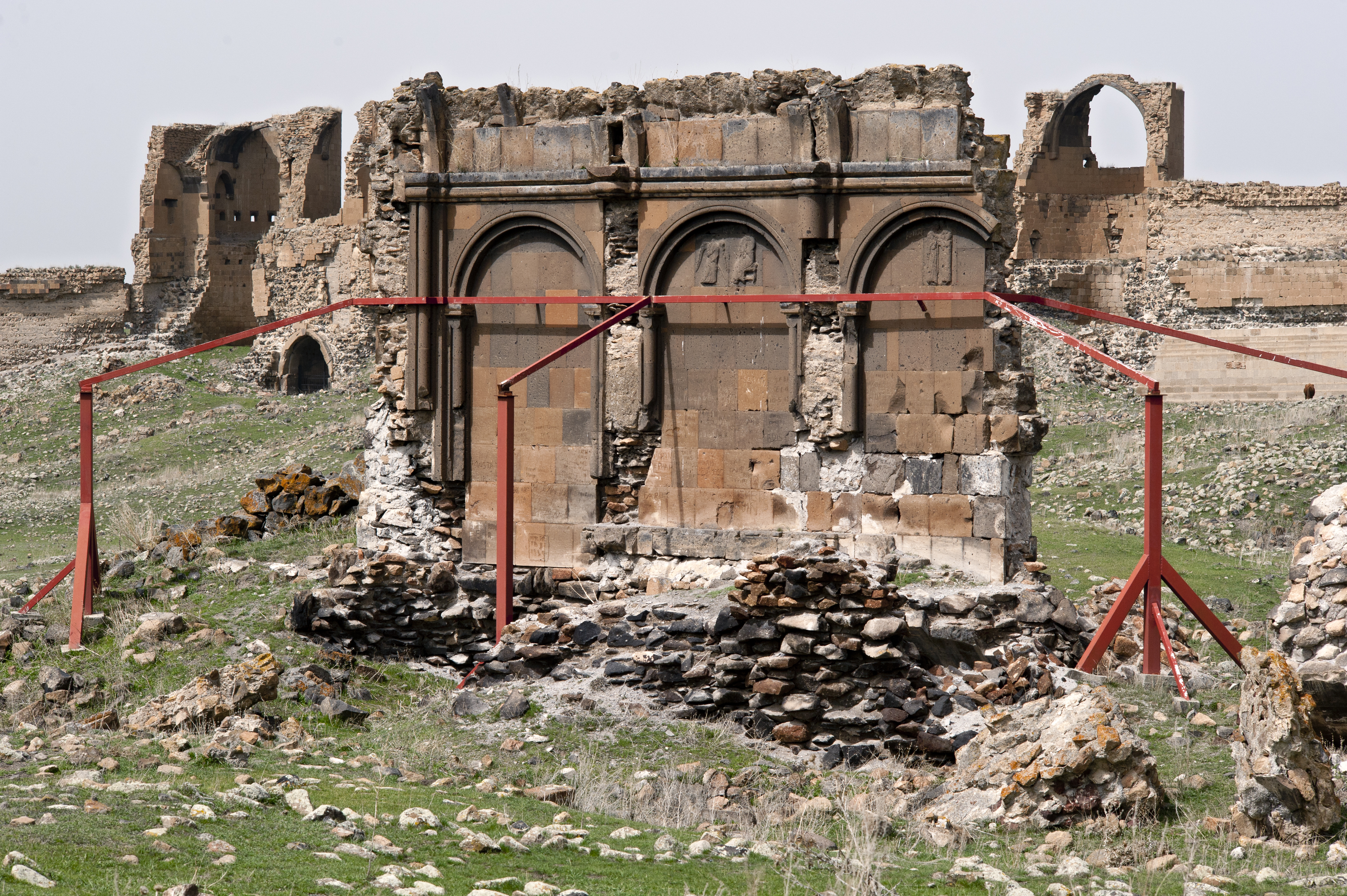
Surp Stephanos Church

There is no inscription giving the date of its construction, but an edict in Georgian is dated 1218. The church was referred to as "Georgian". During this period "Georgian" did not simply mean an ethnic Georgian, it had a denominational meaning and would have designated all those in Ani who professed the Chalcedonian faith, mostly Armenians. Although the Georgian Church controlled this church, its congregation would have mostly been Armenians.

=== The mosque of Manuchihr ===
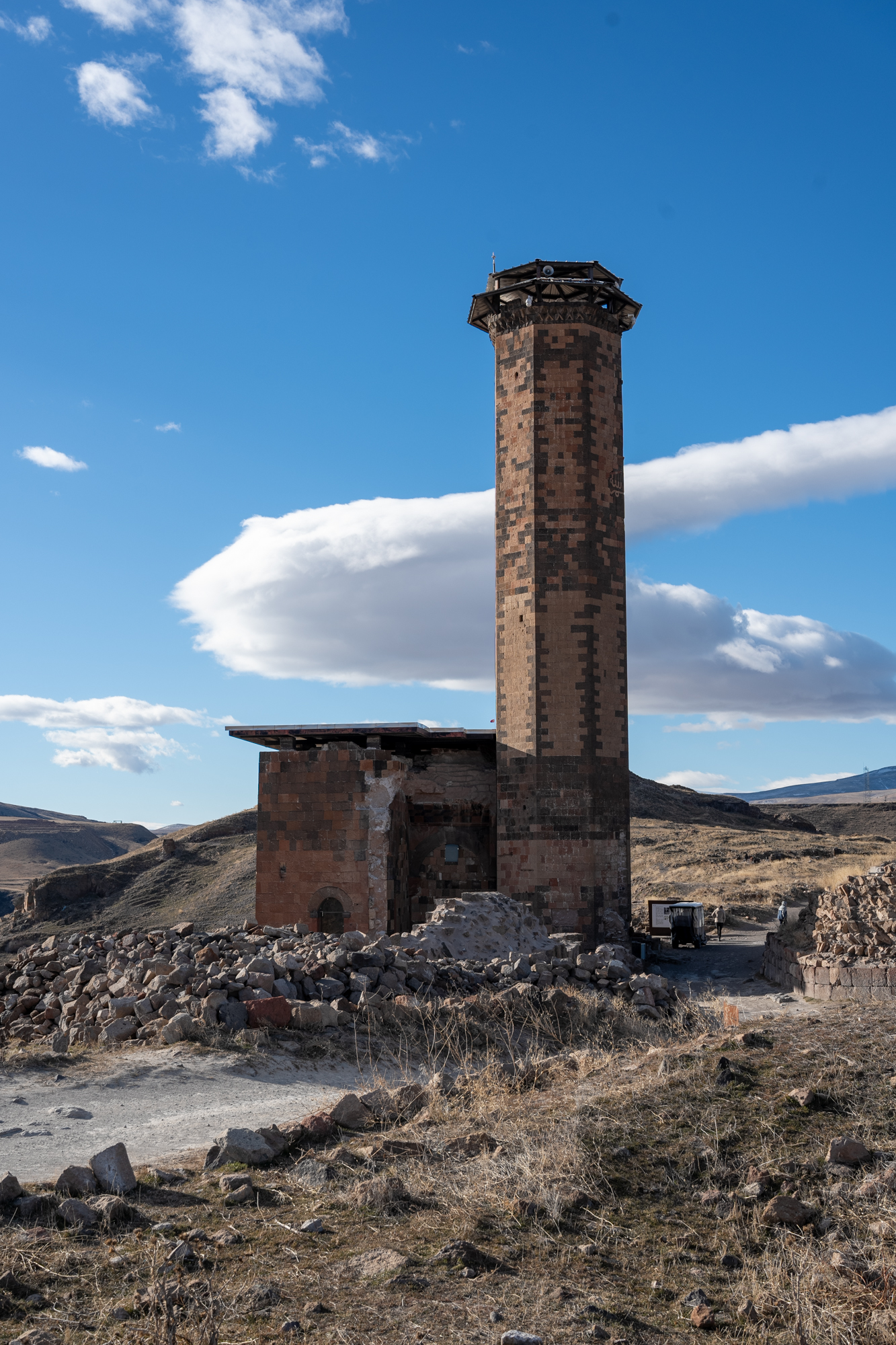
Menucihr Mosque west view

The mosque is named after its presumed founder, Manuchihr, the first member of the Shaddadid dynasty that ruled Ani after 1072. The oldest surviving part of the mosque is its still intact minaret. It has the Arabic word Bismillah ("In the name of God") in Kufic lettering high on its northern face. The prayer hall, half of which survives, dates from a later period (the 12th or 13th century). In 1906 the mosque was partially repaired in order for it to house a public museum containing objects found during Nicholas Marr's excavations. Restoration of the mosque started in June 2020.

=== The citadel ===
At the southern end of Ani is a flat-topped hill once known as Midjnaberd (the Inner Fortress). It has its own defensive walls that date back to the period when the Kamsarakan dynasty ruled Ani (7th century AD). Nicholas Marr excavated the citadel hill in 1908 and 1909. He uncovered the extensive ruins of the palace of the Bagratuni kings of Ani that occupied the highest part of the hill. Also inside the citadel are the visible ruins of three churches and several unidentified buildings. One of the churches, the "church of the palace" is the oldest surviving church in Ani, dating from the 6th or 7th century. Marr undertook emergency repairs to this church, but most of it has now collapsed – probably during an earthquake in 1966.

=== The city walls ===
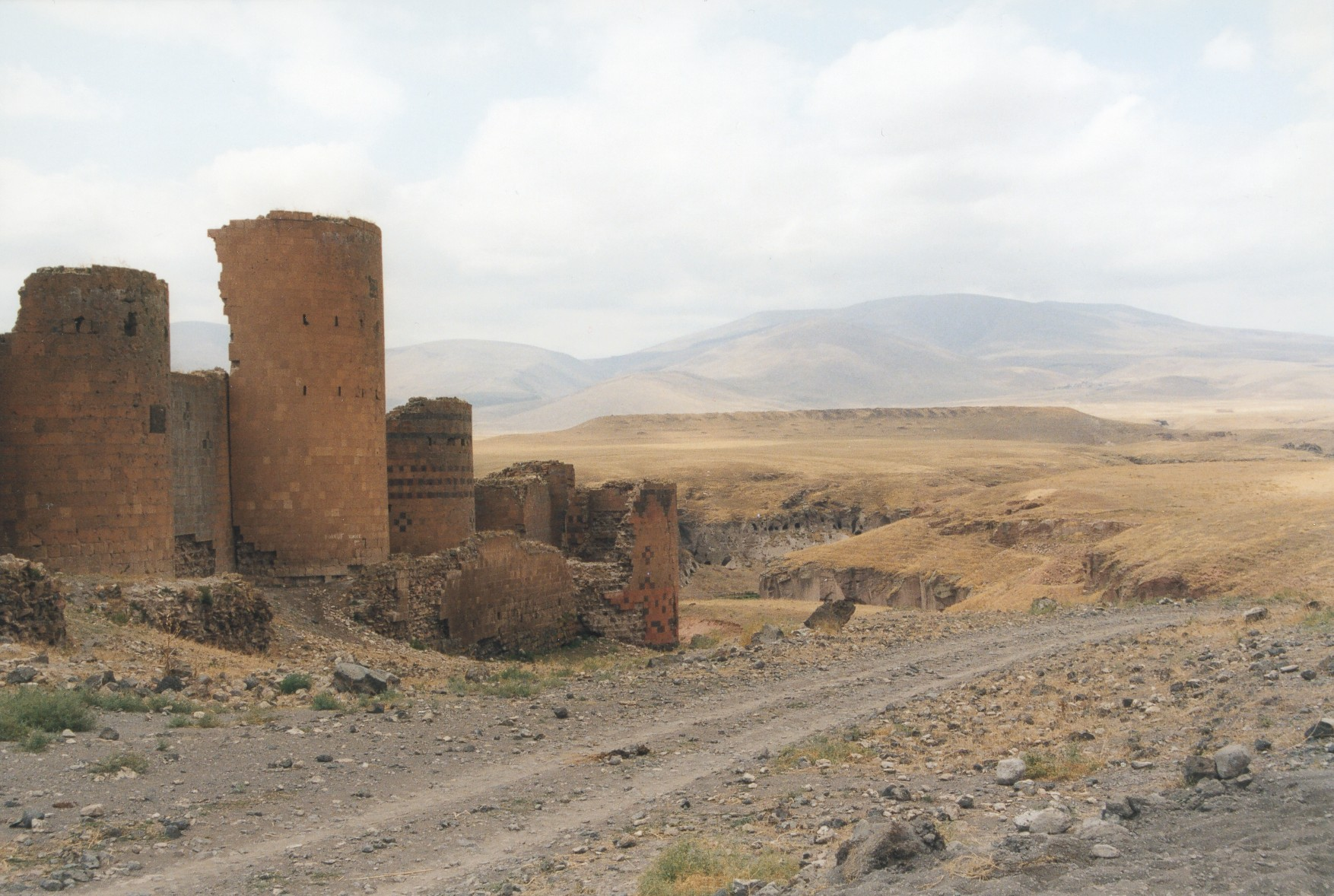
The walls of Ani showing a defensive tower.

A line of walls that encircled the entire city defended Ani. The most powerful defences were along the northern side of the city, the only part of the site not protected by rivers or ravines. Here the city was protected by a double line of walls, the much taller inner wall studded by numerous large and closely spaced semicircular towers. Contemporary chroniclers wrote that King Smbat (977–989) built these walls. Later rulers strengthened Smbat's walls by making them substantially higher and thicker, and by adding more towers. Armenian inscriptions from the 12th and 13th century show that private individuals paid for some of these newer towers. The northern walls had three gateways, known as the Lion Gate, the Kars Gate, and the Dvin Gate (also known as the Chequer-Board Gate because of a panel of red and black stone squares over its entrance).

=== Other monuments ===
There are many other minor monuments at Ani. These include a convent known as the Virgins' chapel; a church used by Chalcedonian Armenians; the remains of a single-arched bridge over the Arpa river; the ruins of numerous oil-presses and several bath houses; the remains of a second mosque with a collapsed minaret; a palace that probably dates from the 13th century; the foundations of several other palaces and smaller residences; the recently excavated remains of several streets lined with shops; etc.

=== Cave Village ===
Directly outside of Ani, there was a settlement-zone carved into the cliffs. It may have served as "urban sprawl" when Ani grew too large for its city walls. Today, goats and sheep take advantage of the caves' cool interiors. One highlight of this part of Ani is a cave church with frescos on its surviving walls and ceiling.

=== Panorama ===
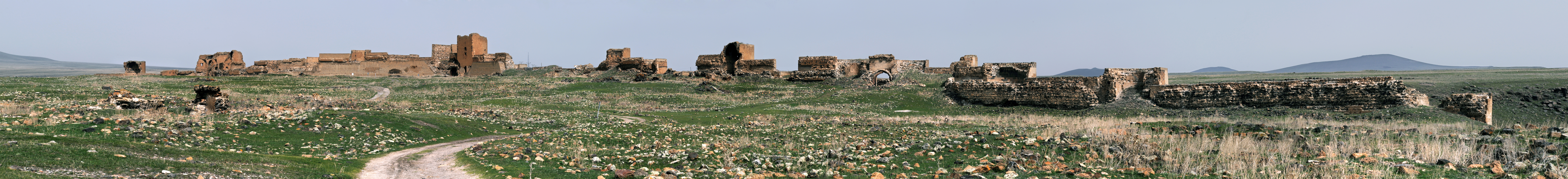
Panoramic view of north walls of Ani, April 2011.

== In culture ==
Ani is one of the most popular female given names in Armenia.

Songs and poems have been written about Ani and its past glory. "Tesnem Anin u nor mernem" (Տեսնեմ Անին ու նոր մեռնեմ, Let me see Ani before I die) is a famous poem by Hovhannes Shiraz. It was turned into a song by Turkish-Armenian composer Cenk Taşkan. Ara Gevorgyan's 1999 album of folk instrumental songs is titled Ani.

Turkish niche perfume brand Nishane and perfumer Cecile Zarokian have created an extrait de parfum named Ani dedicated to the city in 2019, which has gathered positive reviews in the fragrance community. The artwork accompanying the perfume features one of the Ani churches.

== See also ==
- List of kings of Ani
- List of World Heritage Sites in Turkey

== Bibliography ==
General

- Panossian, Razmik (2006). The Armenians: From Kings and Priests to Merchants and Commissars. New York: Columbia University Press. ISBN 9780231139267.

Specific

- Watenpaugh, Heghnar Zeitlian (2014). "Preserving the Medieval City of Ani: Cultural Heritage between Contest and Reconciliation". Journal of the Society of Architectural Historians. 73 (4): 528–555. doi:10.1525/jsah.2014.73.4.528. JSTOR 10.1525/jsah.2014.73.4.528. Archived from the original on October 5, 2016.
