= Ani Mirotadze =

Georgian journalist and politician

- ანი მიროტაძე

Member of Parliament of Georgia
- In office 21 October 2012 – November 2016
- Parliamentary group: Georgian Dream

Personal details
- Born: 22 June 1975 (age 51) Chiatura, Georgian SSR, Soviet Union
- Party: Georgian Dream (until 2019)
- Spouse: Davit Shekiladze
- Children: 2
- Education: Tbilisi State University

Ani Mirotadze (Georgian: ანი მიროტაძე; born 22 June 1975) is a Georgian journalist and politician. She was a member of the Parliament of Georgia from October 2012 to November 2016.

== Biography ==
Mirotadze was born in Chiatura, Imereti on 22 June 1975. She graduated from Ivane Javakhishvili Tbilisi State University, Faculty of Journalism. From 1996 to 2002, she worked as a journalist in the newspaper "Akhali Taoba". From 1998 to 2000, she held the position of General Director of the newspaper "Tbilisi News". In 2002–2003, she hosted the program "Press Screen", which was broadcast by Georgian Public Broadcasting. In 2006, she worked for the TV company "202". From 2006 to 2011, she held the position of General Director of Pirveli Ltd. From 2012 to 2016, she was a member of the Parliament of Georgia of the 8th convocation representing the party Georgian Dream.

Mirotadze was the majoritarian candidate of "Lelo" in Sachkhere-Chiatura-Kharagauli constituency in the 2020 parliamentary elections. She left the party on 2 June 2021, due to differences of opinion. One such issue was the amnesty for the events of 20 June 2019, which Mirotadze did not agree with.

== Personal life ==
Mirotadze has been married to former football player Davit Shekiladze since January 2017. They have two children, Giorgi and Dimitri.
