= Ani (nun) =

Ani is a prefix added to the name of a nun in Tibetan Buddhism. Thus, for example, the full title of a nun whose name is Pema becomes Ani Pema (akin to, for example, "Sister Anne" among Catholic nuns)

In Tibetan, the word ani also translates as aunt, which has special significance in Buddhism as the Buddha's aunt, Mahaprajapati, is said to have been the first Buddhist nun.

Concern over the status implied by the term Ani is said to have led some Vajrayana Buddhist nuns in India to prefer the prefix Cho-la (a Buddhist practitioner) or Tsun-ma (reverend lady) (see reference below).
