= Anie =

Anie may refer to:

- Pic d'Anie, a mountain peak in the Pyrenees of France
- Anié, a town in Togo
- The Anglican Network in Europe (ANiE)
