= Ani Idrus =

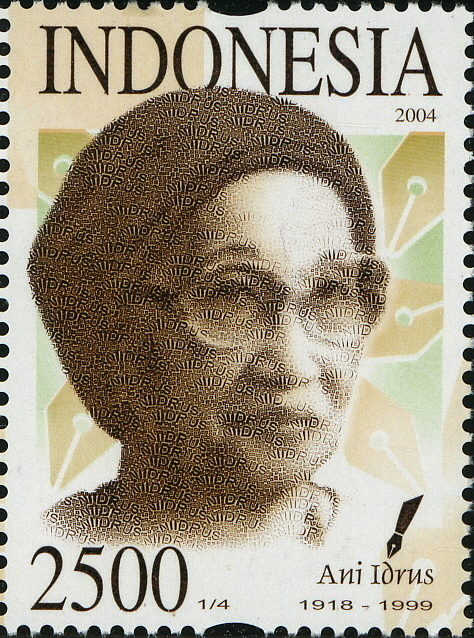

Ani Idrus (25 November 1918 – 9 January 1999) was a prominent reporter and co-founder of the Waspada daily newspaper with her husband Mohamad Said on 1947. Her career started in 1930 as a writer in the Panji Pustaka magazine, Jakarta. On 25 November 2019, Google celebrated her 101st birthday with a Google Doodle.

== List of books ==
- Buku Tahunan Wanita (1953)
- Menunaikan Ibadah Haji ke Tanah Suci (1974)
- Wanita Dulu Sekarang dan Esok (1980)
- Terbunuhnya Indira Gandhi (1984)
- Sekilas Pengalaman dalam Pers dan Organisasi PWI di Sumatra Utara (1985)
- Doa Utama dalam Islam (1987)
