= Ani Widyani =

Indonesian international relations academic

Prof. Dr. Ani Widyani S.Sos., M.A.
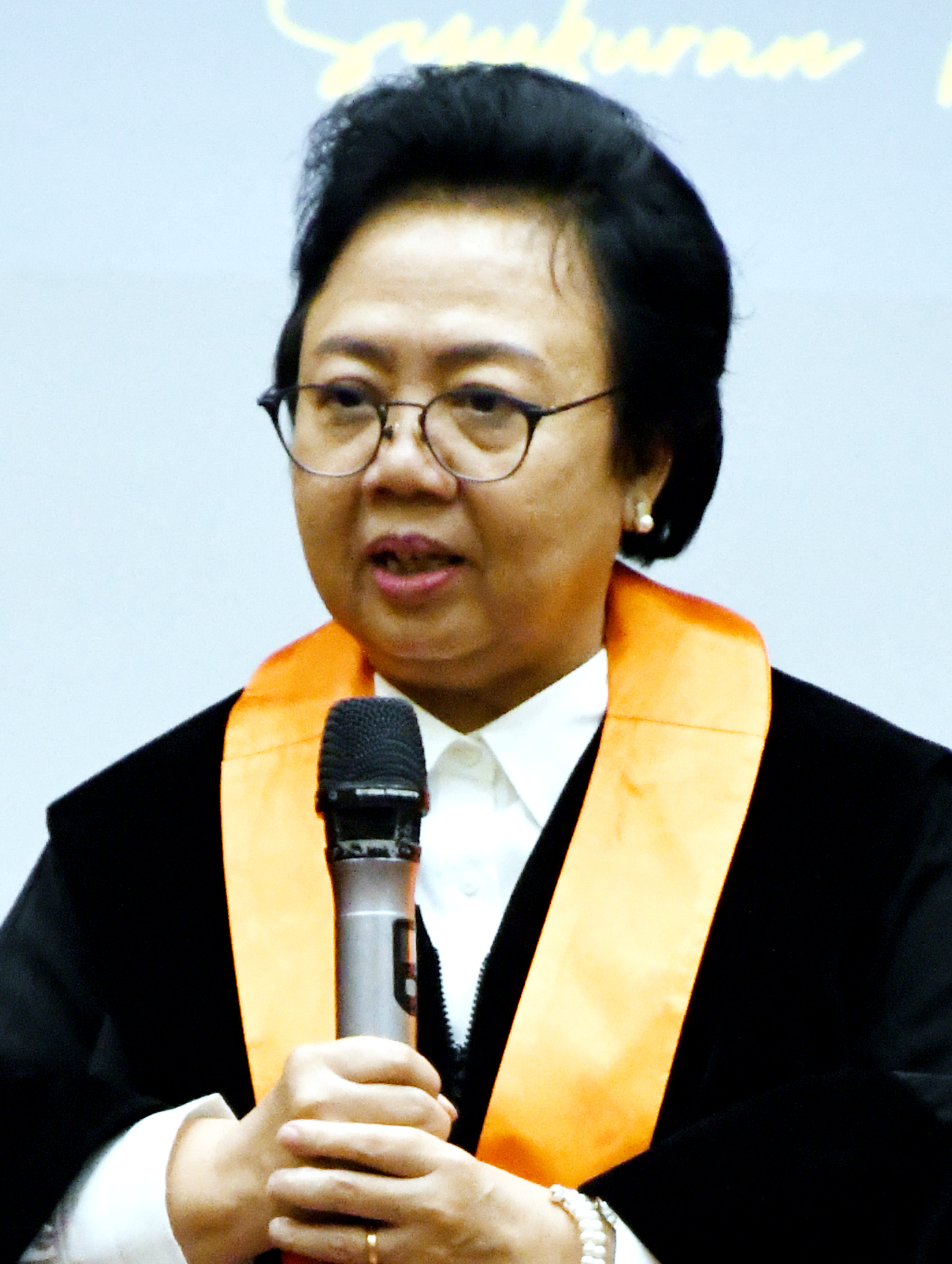
- Born: June 28, 1961 (age 65); Jakarta, Indonesia
- Years active: 1989 – now
- Spouse: Hero Utomo Kuntjoro-Jakti (m. 1994; died 1997)
- Children: 1
- Awards: Satyalancana Karya Satya, 1st Class (2018)

Academic background
- Education: University of Indonesia (S.Sos., Prof.); University of Washington (M.A.); Padjadjaran University (Dr.)

Academic work
- Discipline: International relations
- Sub-discipline: East Asian studies Transnationalism

Ani Widyani Soetjipto (born 28 June 1961) is an Indonesian international relations academic and researcher. She is currently the University of Indonesia (UI) Professor of Gender and Human Rights in International Relations since 21 December 2024. She was previously the chair of the international relations department of the university from 1996 to 1999.

== Early life and education ==
Ani was born in Jakarta on 28 June 1961 to Soetjipto Wirosardjono, former deputy chief of the central statistical bureau, and Muryati. Upon completing high school at the Budi Utomo High School, Ani studied politics at the University of Indonesia and graduated in 1985. She then pursued further studies in the United States and received her master's degree in international studies from the University of Washington in 1989. She received her doctorate degree in international relations from the Padjadjaran University in 2017. Her classmates at the Padjajaran University included former president of the United Nations Security Council Dian Triansyah Djani and the current deputy minister of national development planning Febrian Alphyanto Ruddyard.

== Fall of Suharto ==
Ani began her career as a lecturer in the international relations department in 1989, with a focus on East Asia studies. In 1996, Ani became the chair of the international relations department at the university, serving in the position until 1999. During this time, Ani was actively involved in the movement to topple President Suharto and led UI lecturers who were involved in the movement. On 2 May 1998, the lecturers issued a statement of concern, which was read by Ani. In the statement, the lecturers criticized "the confusion of government policies, the passing of responsibilities, and statements that confuse the public, friendly countries, and international markets" which "worsened the impact of the monetary crisis".

On 1 May, two of Suharto's ministers, Hartono and Alwi Dahlan, stated that the reformation process would be done gradually after 2003 and through parliamentary processes. When the press reported their statements as such, the ministers revoked their statements and claimed that the press had misquoted them. Ani criticized their blaming of the press and claimed that the statement had reduced the credibility of the government in public. After the fall of Suharto, Ani and several other lecturers co-founded the University Network for Free and Fair Elections (Unfrel).

== Academic career ==
Aside from teaching at the international relations department, Ani also taught woman and politics at UI's woman studies postgraduate major. She was also the Project Coordinator of Convention Watch Working Group (CWWG), a convention observer group established under the major, from 1995 to 2001, and a senior researcher at the Center of Political Studies under the politics department of UI. Outside the university, Ani was a board member of the Centre for Electoral Reform (CENTRO) since 1999, the Indonesian Women's Caring Movement since 2003, and the Women's Voice Empowerment Movement since 2004.

Ani headed the woman's division department at CENTRO from 2002 to 2005. During this period, she successfully advocated a thirty percent quota for women candidates in the 2004 Indonesian legislative election. From 2007 to 2008, Ani advocated affirmative policy for women in politics and the legal system through the adoption of the zipper system. Ani also advocated the creation of various laws relating to gender in Indonesia, such as the anti-domestic violence law (2005), anti-trafficking law (2007), citizenship law (2006), political party law (2002 and 2008), and election law (2003 and 2008).

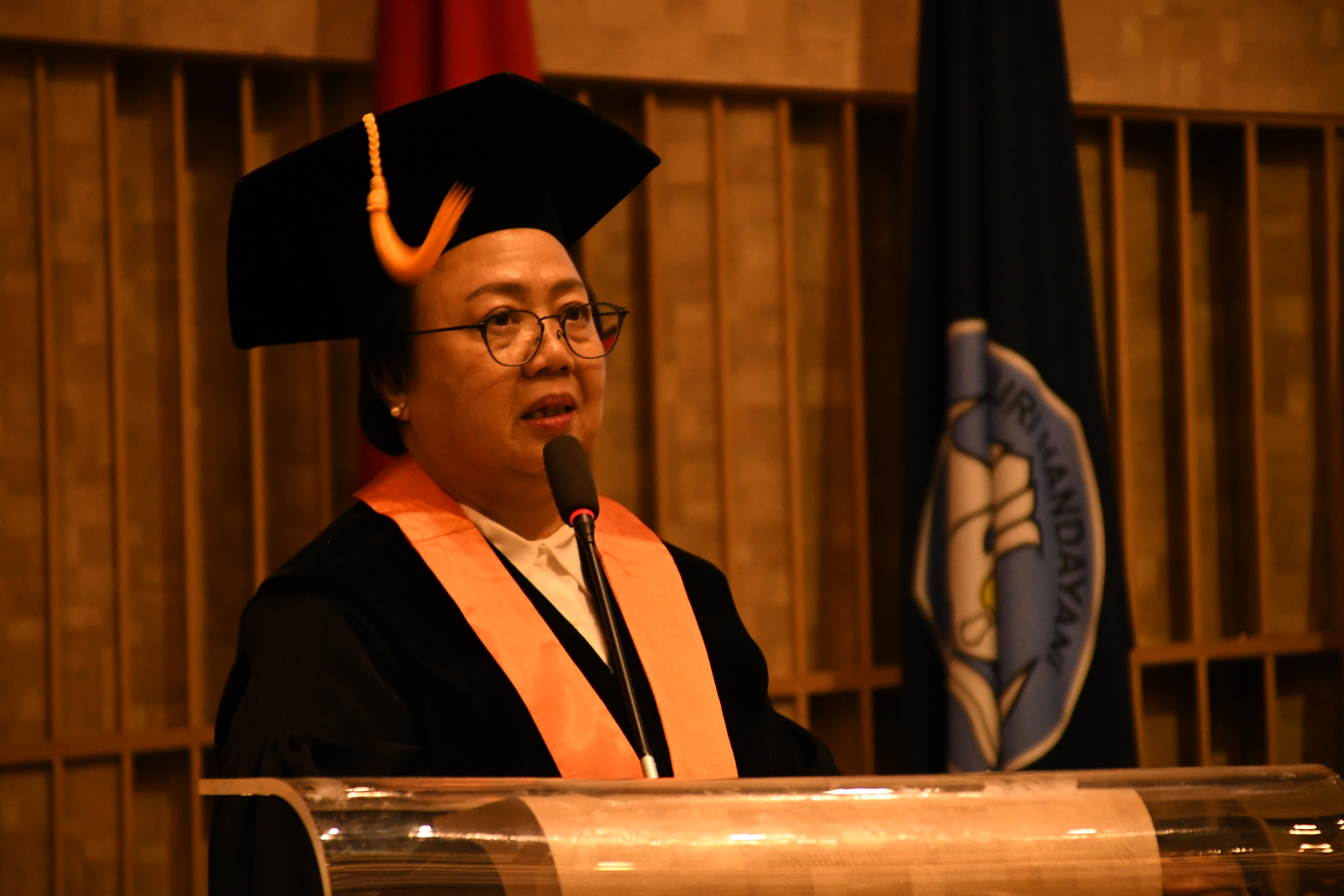
Ani Widyani reading her inaugural speech as professor.

On 1 September 2024, Ani was appointed as the University of Indonesia's Professor of Gender and Human Rights in International Relations. Her inaugural speech as professor, which was read on 21 December 2024, was titled Human Rights, Gender and Global Politics: An Intersectionality Perspective. Her speech discussed the historical development of International Relations (IR) studies, especially post-World War II, and the importance of human rights and gender equality in global governance. The speech also emphasized the interconnectedness of human rights and gender issues in IR, highlighting the role of feminism in understanding global politics, and addressed the concept of intersectionality, its origins in black feminism, and its relevance in contemporary IR studies. She also reflected on unresolved human rights issues in Papua, Indonesia, and called for more inclusive and just political practices.

== Personal life ==
Ani was married to Hero Utomo Kuntjoro-Jakti, a fellow international relations lecturer and an East Asia expert at the university. Hero was the younger brother of the former ambassador to the United States and coordinating minister for economy Dorodjatun Kuntjoro-Jakti. Ani met Hero during her master's studies at the University of Washington in 1987. The couple was married in 1994, while Ani was still in the United States. The couple lived together along with their daughter, Mirna Heradyani, in Jagakarsa, South Jakarta. Hero died in 1997 due to his illness and the family moved to Ani's childhood house in Cempaka Putih, Central Jakarta.
