= Kwadwo Ani =

Ghanaian painter

Kwadwo Ani (born 1966), is a Ghanaian painter. He is one of Ghana's premier contemporary artists.

== Biography ==
Kwadwo Ani was born in Accra, Ghana, in 1966. He studied at the Ghanatta College of Art and the Ankle College of Art. He has participated in many group and solo exhibitions throughout Ghana and internationally. His work is held in collections at the Alliance Francaise, Ghana; Ghana Broadcasting Corporation; and the Ministry of Culture of China.

Kwadwo Ani recently completed a touring exhibition in Europe sponsored by the British Royal Overseas League. In 2004, Ani won a residency in the Vermont Studio Center sponsored by the Ford Foundation.

His recent work plays on Ani-kese, which translates to "Big Eye" – Ani in his native language means "eye". In the distinctive childlike style of his recent work, he strives to portray the world around him through big, wide open eyes, with the honesty and sincerity that only a naïve child possesses. His works provoke instant laughter, or sometimes fear.
