= Ani Zalinyan =

Dutch politician (born 1993)

Member of the House of Representatives
- Incumbent
- Assumed office 12 November 2025

Alderwoman in Heemskerk
- In office 2 June 2022 – 12 November 2025

Personal details
- Born: 3 June 1993 (age 33) Vanadzor, Armenia
- Citizenship: Armenia; Netherlands
- Party: GroenLinks (until 2026); PRO (since 2026)
- Education: Leiden University; Vrije Universiteit Amsterdam
- Occupation: Lawyer • Politician

Ani Zalinyan (Armenian: Անի Զալինյան; born 3 June 1993) is an Armenian-born Dutch politician of GroenLinks–PvdA, who was elected as a member of the House of Representatives in the 2025 general election. Since 2022, she has been an alderwoman of Heemskerk on behalf of GroenLinks.
