= Ani Phyo =

American author and whole food advocate

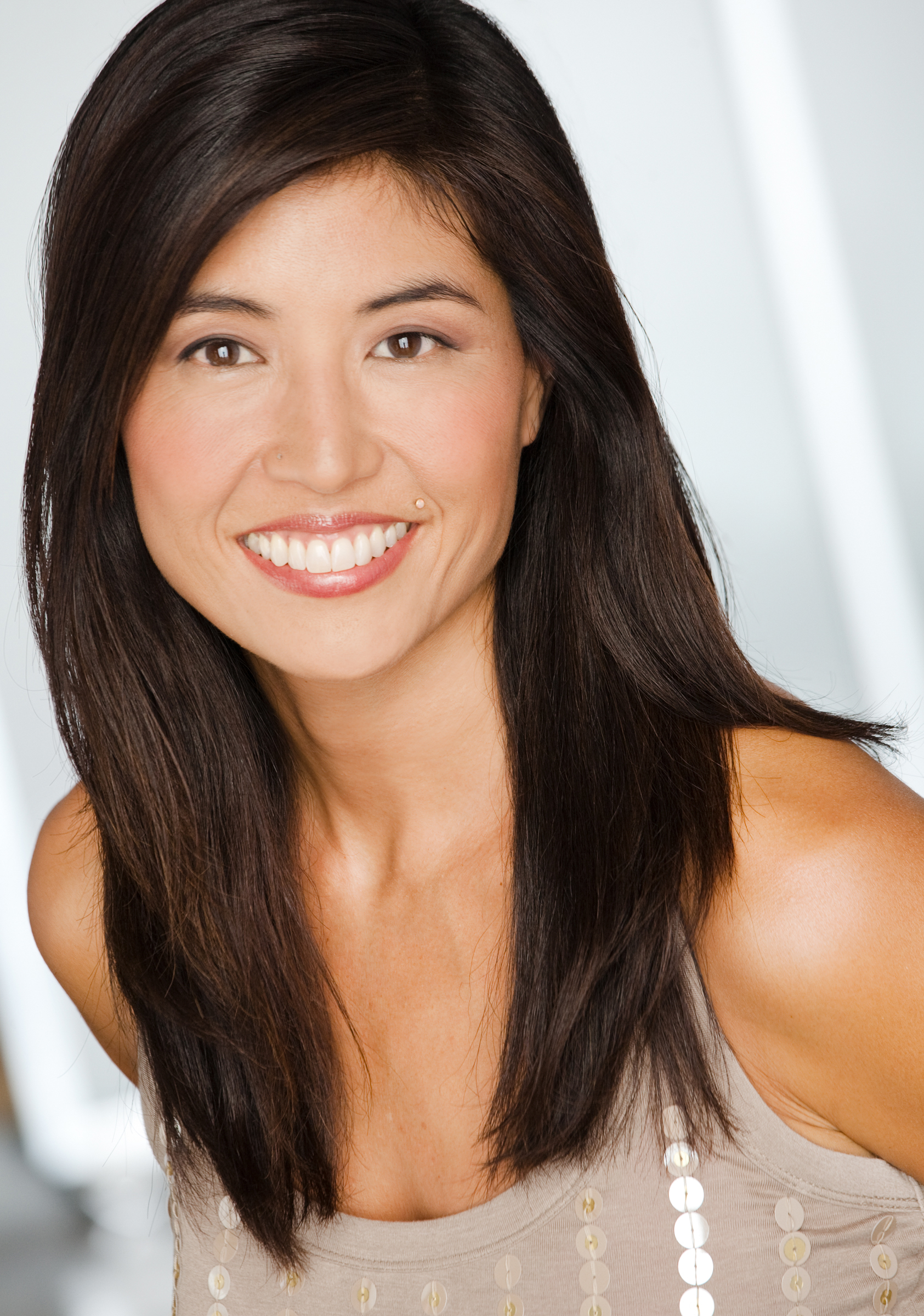
Ani Phyo

Ani Phyo (born July 17, 1968) is a Canadian-born American organic chef, author, whole food and sustainable agriculture advocate. She is an advocate of raw foodism lifestyle promoting uncooked and unprocessed foods that are organic, sustainable, and supports green living.

== Early years and education ==
Ani Phyo was born July 17, 1968, in Nova Scotia, Canada, and raised primarily in upstate New York, outside Buffalo. She is of Korean descent. Her father raised her on mostly vegan fresh whole and raw foods. They had their own organic farm growing up, and grew their own produce for food and juicing.

Her first job after college was working retail management at Macy's in Herald Square in New York City. Soon afterwards, she moved to London, England for a year and a half, then to Sydney, Australia for 7 months. Upon her return to upstate New York, she studied post-graduate social psychology, computer art, and fine art, which launched her career in multimedia. She produced live multimedia events and convergence TV and internet experiences through the 1990s, and co-founded a multimedia production studio and event company. During this time, she discovered that eating raw foods fueled her mental clarity and focus, and kept her healthy. This was the early beginning of her raw food career.

Phyo attended Ewha and Yonsei Universities and studied international business, graduating in 1987 and 1989, respectively. She then graduated from Cornell University with a dual bachelor's in human ecology design and business management, and a minor in nutritional sciences in 1990. She then did some post-graduate work in social psychology, 3-D modeling and simulation, computer art, fine art and sculpting at SUNY Buffalo, finishing in 1994.

== Career ==
SmartMonkey Foods was co-founded by Phyo in 1999 in Los Angeles, CA. SMF started as a catering and events company, hosting gourmet raw food dinners in Hollywood, Santa Monica, and Pasadena, CA. As customer requests increased for packed and prepared foods, the SmartMonkey Foods line of packed dressings, sauces, cheeses, pizza crust, desserts was launched.

The company moved to Portland, Oregon for 4 years from 2003 to 2006, where it provided catering, packaged prepared foods, classes, retreats, weekly cafes, monthly special events, and their fruit and nut bars called SmartMonkey Bars. Clients included Nike, Adidas, Portland Institute of Contemporary Art, and Carnival Cruise Lines, to name a few.

Phyo sold SmartMonkey Foods, which ceased operations in 2009.

Phyo moved to San Francisco and founded a multimedia company called SmartMonkey Media, which produced live multimedia events, including the world's first online fashion show, "Fiber", in 1994 Netcast over copper lines before ISDN or T1 lines were available to the U.C. Berkeley multicast backbone (known as MBone), this show was attended by a global audience via the internet.

As an early pioneer of the web, Phyo was a part of San Francisco digital lab, Cyberlab 7, and founder of Dimension 7, where she handled CG work on Virtuosity, the early cyber film starring Denzel Washington and Russell Crowe and produced by Paramount Pictures. A partial client list includes Warner Bros. (Porno For Pyros tour, Perry Farrell), Yerba Buena Center for the Arts in San Francisco, Microsoft, Pacific Bell, and Ninja Tunes UK.

Phyo has produced numerous websites, including a 14,000 page rich-media educational site for Simon & Schuster in 1996. One ground-breaking project sent video jockeys across the Mediterranean on bicycles with laptops and video cameras. The VJs would post their journals online, shoot video and overnight it to Phyo, who would edit them and put them onto the website. The VJs would chat online from a different classroom weekly during their journey, and this occurred more than 10 years prior to YouTube and Facebook.

Her book Return on Design was an early educational book on user-centered interaction design for the Web and wireless technologies which came out of the design and media classes she taught at U.C. Berkeley, San Francisco State University, and San Jose State University. Phyo owned a web design studio that sold in 1999.

Phyo has been a consultant for the Disney Channel (convergence TV and web), ABC Family, Gymboree, Electronic Arts, and Apple Inc., among others. She lives in Los Angeles, California with her Rhodesian Ridgeback, Kanga.
