= Kurdish Muslims =

Kurds who follow Islam

Kurdish Muslims موسڵمانی کورد, Musilmanên Kurd
Regions with significant populations
- Kurdistan and Kurdish diaspora

Religions
- Sunni Islam (Shafi'ism); Shia Islam (Twelver); Kurdish Alevism; Sufism

Scriptures
- Quran and (except for Alevis) Hadith

Languages
- Kurdish; Zaza–Gorani

Kurdish Muslims (Kurdish: موسڵمانی کورد, romanized: Musilmanên Kurd) are Kurds who follow Islam, which has the most common religion for the Kurds for centuries.

== History ==
Before Islam, the majority of Kurds followed western Iranic paganism, which originates from Indo-Iranian traditions. The Kurds first encountered Islam in the 7th century during the early Muslim conquests. The nation was divided between the Byzantine and Persian Empires but then united under the Rashidun Caliphate.

Jaban al-Kurdi and his son Meymun al-Kurdi were the first Kurds to convert to Islam and were Muslim missionaries who helped introduce Islam to many other Kurds. Khalil al-Kurdi al-Semmani was one of the first Kurdish tabi'un, the generation of Muslims after Muhammad. Widespread conversion of Kurds to Islam began under Umar ibn Al-Khattab, the second caliph of the Rashidun Caliphate, who ruled between 634 and 644.

The Kurds first came into contact with the Muslim armies during the Muslim conquest of Persia in 637. The Kurdish tribes had been an important element in the Sasanian Empire and initially gave strong support to the Sasanians as they tried to fight the Muslim armies, between 639 and 644. However, once it was clear that the Sassanids would soon fall, the Kurdish chiefs one by one submitted to the Muslim armies and agreed to accept Islam, which led to their tribe members doing the same.

Although the Muslims established control over all of Kurdistan, and most Kurds converted to Islam, small communities of Kurds remained in the impenetrable mountains and did not accept Islam. In the 13th century, some of them remained and occasionally attacked Muslim settlements. Bar Hebraeus wrote that it "in the year six hundred and two of the Arabs [1205 AD], a race of the Kurds who were in the mountains of Madai (Media), and who are called Tirahaye, came down from the mountains, and wrought great destruction in those countries. And troops of the Persians were gathered together, and they met them in battle and many of them were killed. Now these mountaineers had not entered the Faith of the Muslims, but they had adopted the primitive paganism and Magianism. When a Muslim fell into their hands they put him to death with cruel tortures." By the 8th century, the most of them had already converted to Islam without Arabization. The Kurds resisted Arabs for social reasons rather than reluctance to accept Islam.

Today, most Kurds are Sunni Muslims, but there are Shia, Sufi, and Alevi minorities. Sunni Muslim Kurds are mostly Shafi'is. There was a small minority of Zaydi Kurds before the decline of Zaydism. Approximately 75% of Kurds are Sunni Muslims, and approximately 15% are Shia Muslims, with the remaining 10% being many other religions.

The Ayyubid dynasty, which was Kurdish in origin, was among the most prominent Islamic empires of the 12th century and ruled over Egypt and the Levant. It was notable for defeating the Fatimid Caliphate and the Third Crusade, both of which were accomplished by its founder, Saladin. Saladin remains a much-celebrated figure in Islamic historiography. He and his successors also laid the groundwork for much of the cultural and artistic heritage of the mediaeval Middle East, such as the Cairo Citadel. Kurdish culture under the Ayyubids also flourished, receiving patronage alongside Arab and other cultures.

== Contemporary Kurdish Muslims ==
Islam has gained strong support from Kurds and has historically acted as the back-bone of the Kurdish movement.

After the secularization of Turkey, Turkish Kurdistan became the last stronghold of Islam, where Islamic schools were preserved, and many Turkish Muslim scholars went to Kurdistan in order to gain Islamic education. The first mosque in modern-day Turkey was Menüçehr Mosque, built in 1072 by the Kurdish Muslim dynasty of the Shaddadids.

After the rise of Kurdish-Islamic nationalism (a Kurdish nationalist and Islamist ideology) in the 1980s, the Kurdish Islamists combined their Kurdish identity and Islam to defend the Kurds against their main enemies: Iraq, Iran, Turkey and Syria.

== See also ==
- A Modern History of the Kurds, by David McDowall
- Spread of Islam among Kurds
- Kurdish communities in the former Ayyubid Sultanate
- Said Nursi
