= Bagnayr Monastery =

Ruined Armenian monastery in Kars Province, Turkey

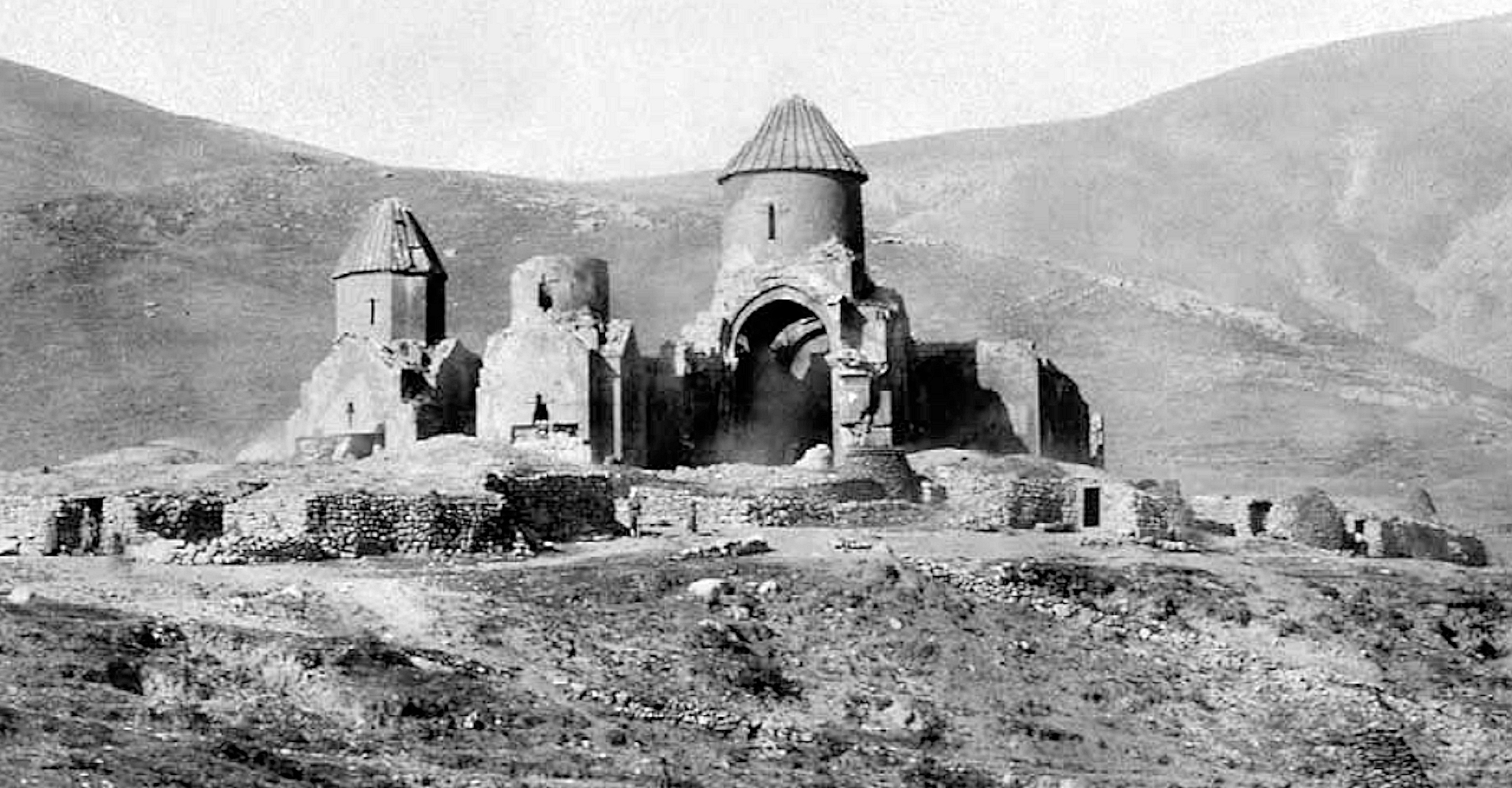
- Bagnayr Monastery from the east, end of 19th century. Photo by Dimitri Yermakov

- Location within Turkey

Religion
- Affiliation: Armenian Apostolic Church
- Status: ruined

Location
- Location: Kozluca, Kars
- Coordinates: 40°30′46″N 43°29′09″E

Architecture
- Style: Armenian
- Completed: 10th-13th century

The Bagnayr Monastery is a monastery in Kozluca, Kars, 7 kilometers northwest of Ani, built in the 11th century CE. It was "one of the most renowned monastic complexes in medieval Armenia". The monastery was standing at the end of the 19th century, but is now almost completely in ruins.

== Construction ==
According to Armenian sources, the 11th century historian Stepanos Asoghik, Vahram Pahlavouni (died 1046) founded the monastery in the year 989. The son of Vahram, Smbat Magistros Pahlavuni, is thought to have founded the main church, Surp Astuacacin, "Holy Mother of God". The church's oldest inscription is dated 1042. The monastery was a major religious center in the 1040s and the Pahlavunis maintained their patronage into the 13th century. Various inscriptions mention the construction of chapels in 1145, 1200, 1223 and 1229. The monastery was probably abandoned at the end of the 13th century.

Two walls and an arch vaulted door remain, but the annular vault of the door is ruined. At the internal section of the remaining walls, 5 arches and 5 dummy columns are interconnected and epitaphs are placed in between the columns. The middle dome and north wall of the church are collapsed and only 2 columns have remained. The top of the remaining south walls is decorated with geometrical designs in carving technique.

A large zhamatun, actually larger than the church, was built in the late 12th century, its oldest inscription dating to 1201. It is structured around four free-standing columns and eight engaged semi-columns, and its stone ceiling has nine compartments. The central compartment had a pyramidal vault with muqarnas stalactite moulding, which is considered similar to that of the Church of the Holy Apostles at Ani.

An hexagonal chapel stands north of the main complex, and is probably dated to the 9th or 10th century, given its similarity to the church of St. Gregory of the Abughamrents in Ani. This Küçük Kozluca Church, remains partially preserved. This six-foil domed church has lost all of the coverings, and almost all of the exterior stone blocks have been scavenged, but the basic structure remains intact.

Numerous dedicatory inscriptions have been found on the site.

== Style ==
The columns are short and rather fat, and are decorated with muqarnas ornementation. Such decorations can also be found in Horomos Monastery (dated 1277) or the Menucihr Mosque (dated 1072-1086).

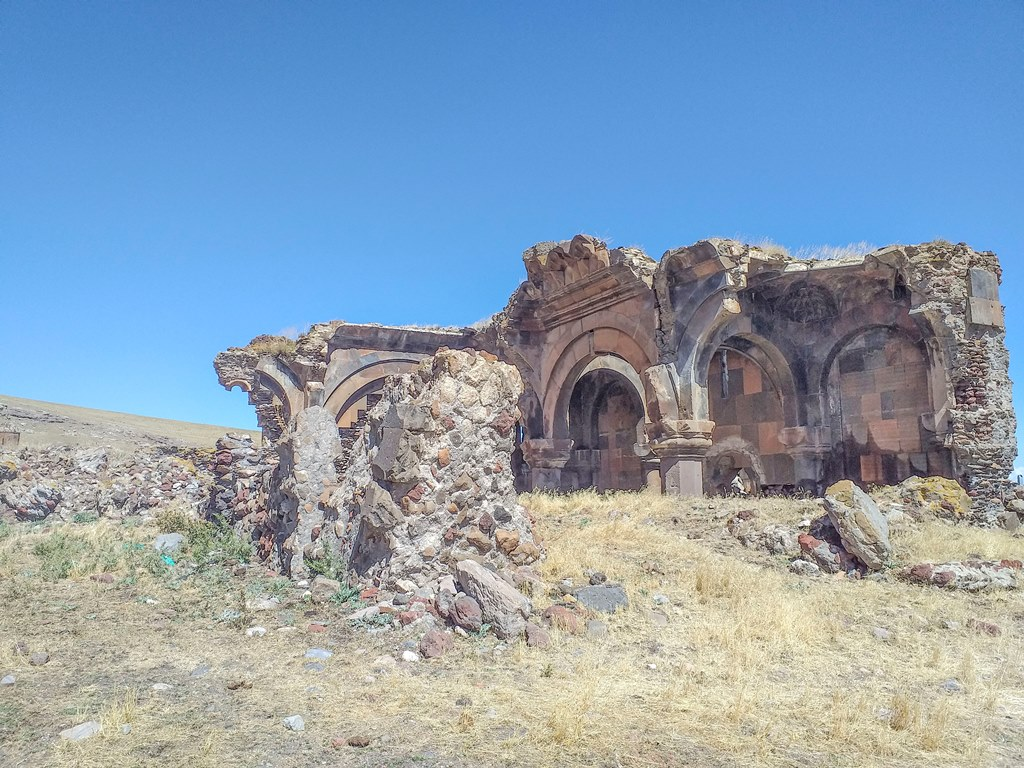
Remains of the monastery

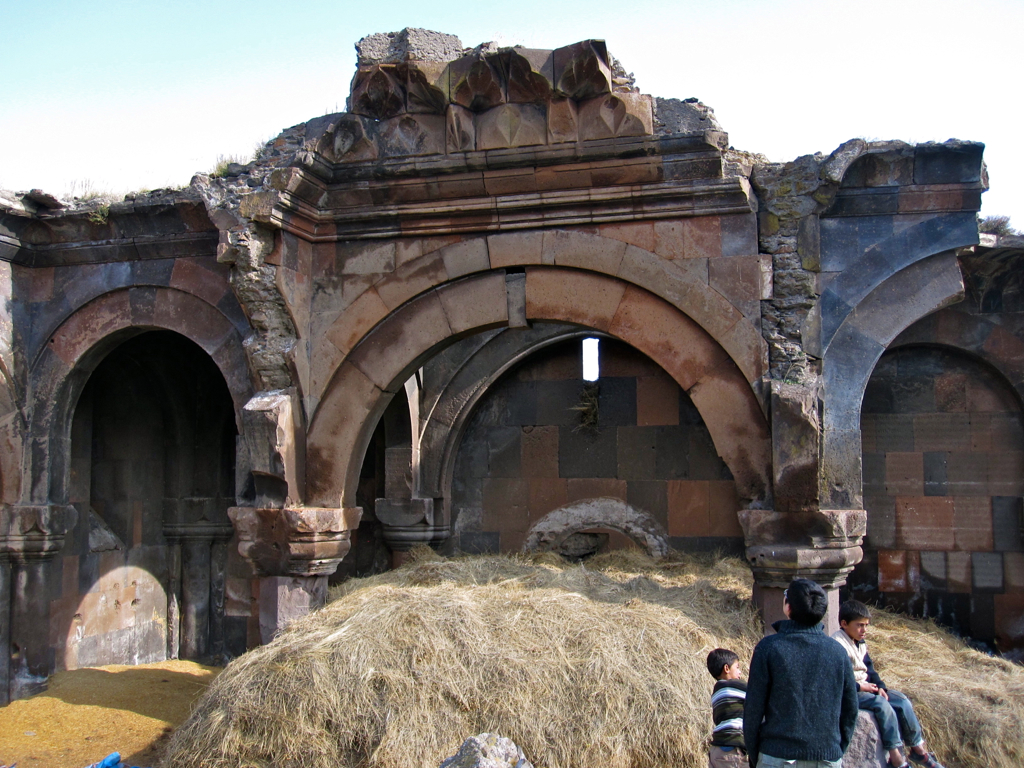
Bagnayr Monastery, zhamatun columns and arcades, and remain of the central vault decorated by muqarnas.

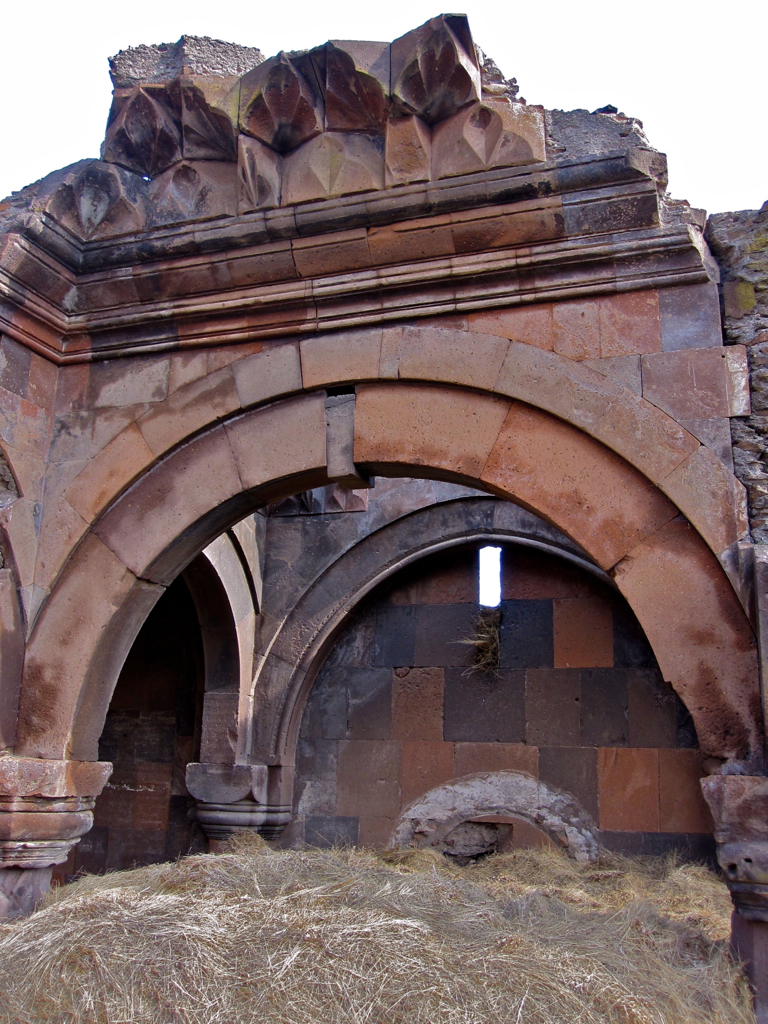
Wall with muqarnas decorations.

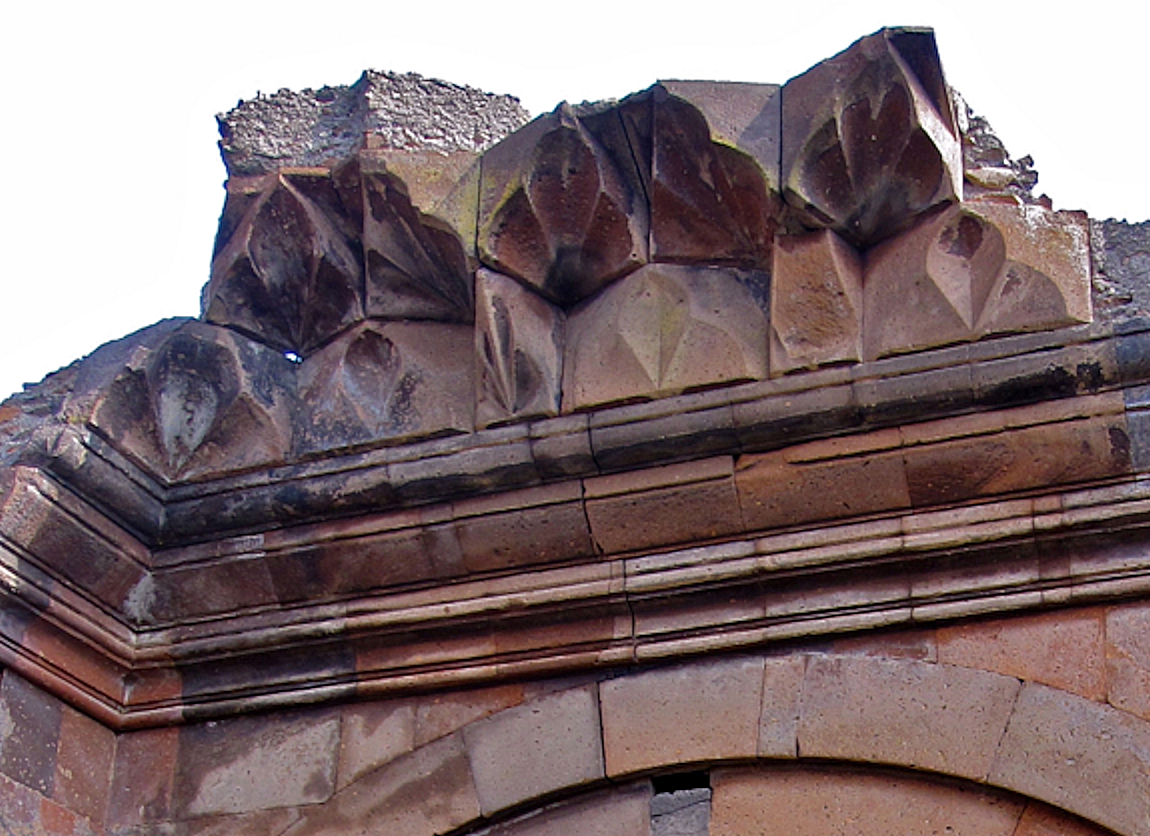
Bagnayr Monastery muqarnas.

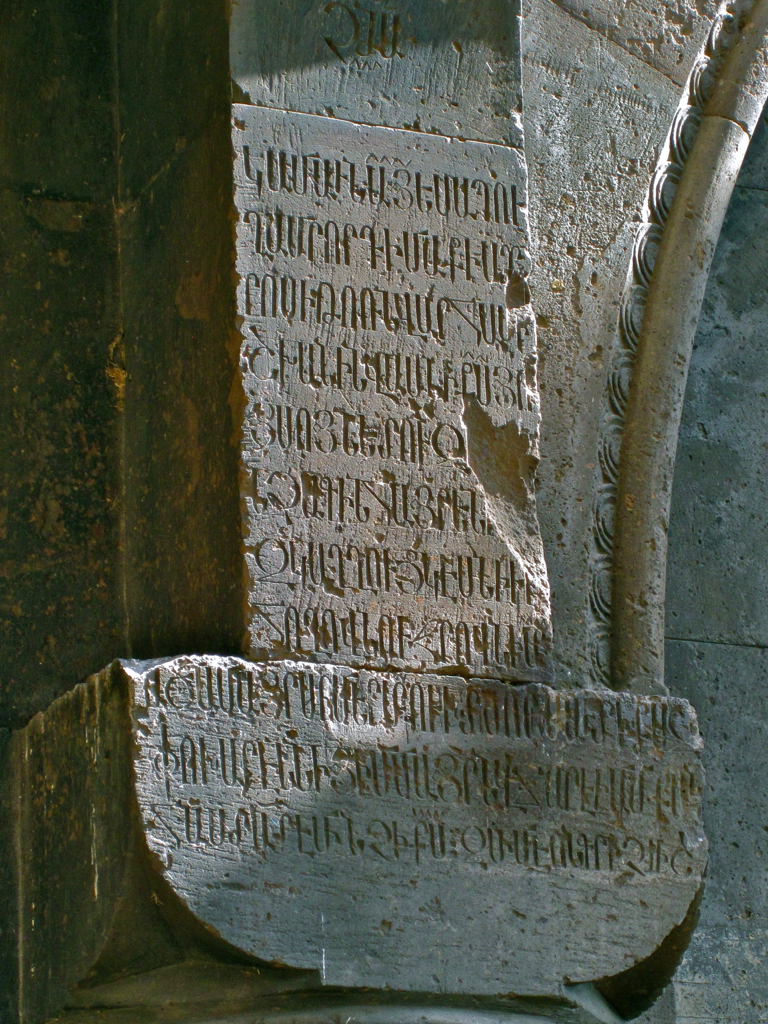
Inscription of 1262 and 1267.

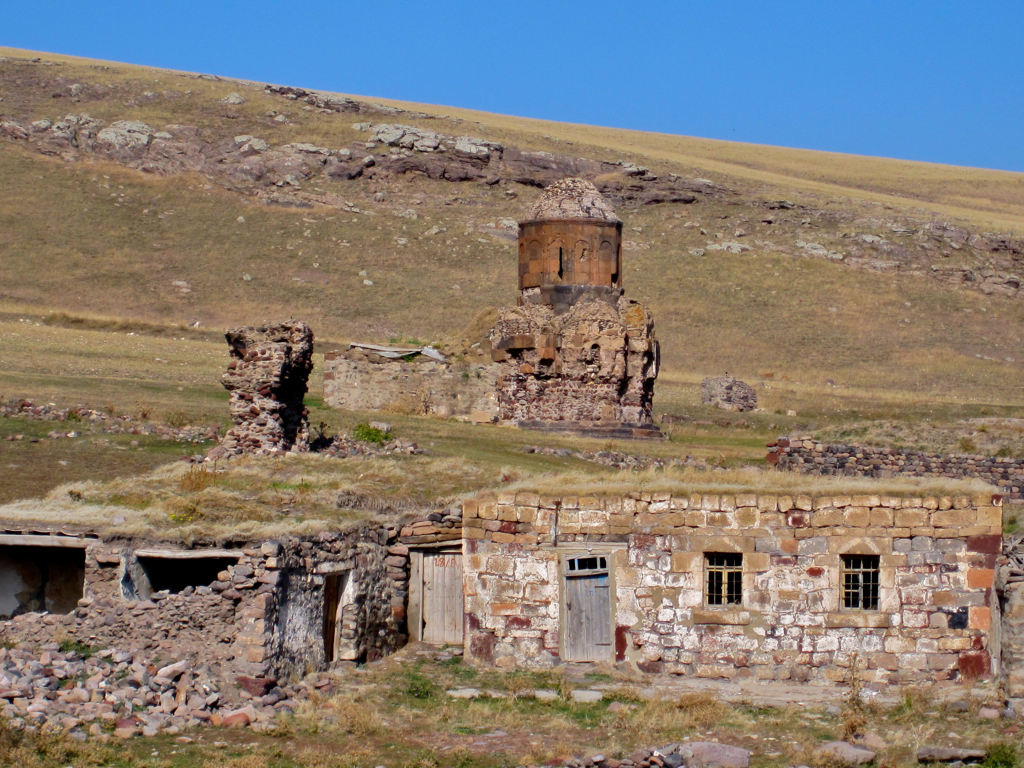
The hexagonal chapel, at a distance from the main monastery

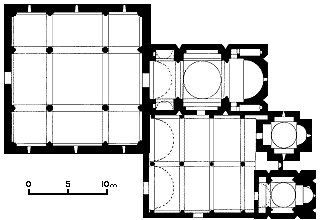
Plan

== Sources ==
- Karapetian, Samvel (2013). "The Inscriptions of Bagnayr Monastery" (PDF). VARDZK Research on Armenian Architecture. 9: 16–41.
