= Spread of Islam among Kurds =

Islamic conversion of Kurds

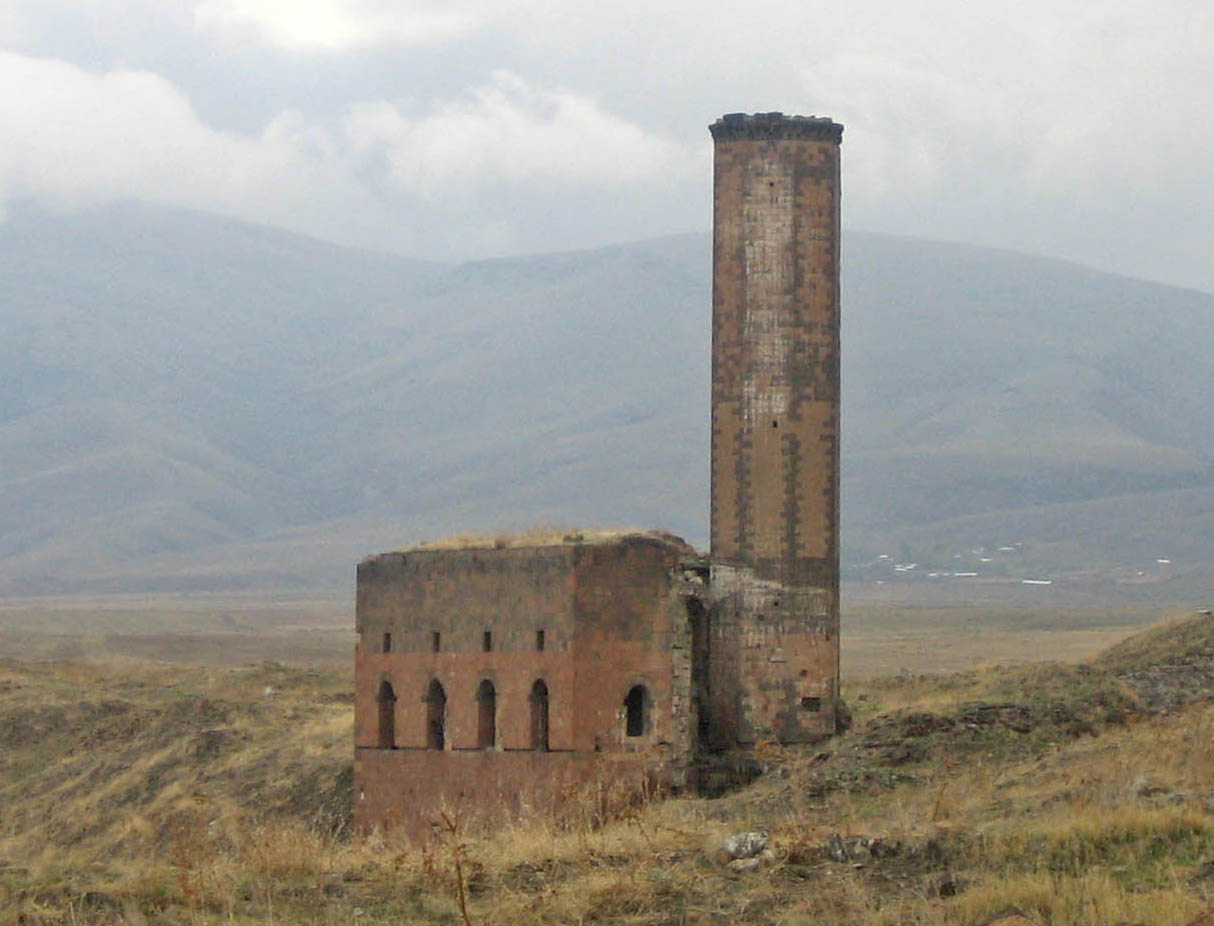
The ruins of Menüçehr Mosque, the first mosque in Turkey which was built by the Kurdish dynasty of Shaddadids in the medieval Armenian city of Ani.

Spread of Islam among Kurds started in the 7th century with the early Muslim conquests Before Islam, Kurds followed indigenous Kurdish religions, pre-Zoroastrian faiths, and Manichaeism and Zoroastrianism to a lesser extent. Judaism, introduced by exiled Jewish communities, and Christianity, succeeded in converting large parts of northern and southern Kurdistan prior to the rise of Islam. Some elements of pre-Zoroastrian faiths and native Kurdish religions survived in Yezidism and Yarsanism.

== History ==
Mass conversion of Kurds to Islam did not happen until the reign of Umar ibn Al-Khattab, the second caliph of the Rashidun Caliphate between 634 and 644. The Kurds first came into contact with Muslim Arab armies during the Arab conquest of Mesopotamia in 637. The Kurdish tribes had been an important element in the Sasanian Empire, and initially gave it strong support as it tried to withstand the Muslim armies, between 639 and 644. Once it was clear that the Sassanians would eventually fall, some Kurdish tribal leaders submitted to Islam and their tribe members followed in accepting Islam, while others continued to resist in the centuries after.

The centralized Islamic caliphates, including the Umayyad Caliphate and the Abbasid Caliphate, often struggled to exert consistent control over Kurdistan. The geographer Yaqut al-Hamawi described the Kurds of Shahrizor as insurgent and resistant to caliphal authority, noting that the caliphs never fully subdued them.

Kurdish tribes are recorded as having participated in numerous revolts across the region, from Jazira and Mosul to Isfahan, Hamadan, and Shahrizor. Examples include revolts in 645 and 659, and two revolts in 666 two in Ahvaz and Fars, the revolts against the Umayyads in 685, 702, and 708, revolts against the Abbasids in 840, 846, and 866 when they seized Mosul, the Mosul rebellion led by Ja'far ibn Fahrjis in 902, the Shahrizor uprising led by Abi Rabi al-Kurdi, another Mosul revolt led by Muhammad Bilal al-Kurdi, and the Isfahan revolt led by Abdullah ibn Ibrahim al-Kurdi. Several Kurdish cities, including Dinavar and Hulwan, were at times destroyed by the Caliphates' armies as a result of repeated uprisings.

Kurds also appear in accounts of Mazdakism and the neo-Mazdaki revolt of Babak Khorramdin in the early 9th century. A Kurdish leader named Nârseh, identified by the medieval Muslim historian Al-Masudi as "Nasir the Kurd," is said to have led a Khurramite uprising in southern Kurdistan. The rebellion was eventually suppressed during the reign of the Al-Mu'tasim (r. 833–842). According to the historian Al-Tabari, approximately 60,000 of Nârseh's followers were killed by Abbasid forces. The remaining rebels, including Nârseh himself, reportedly fled into the Byzantine Empire in 833. Kurds also gave their support for broader revolutionary movements of the period, including the Zanj Rebellion the rebellion of Ya'qub ibn al-Layth al-Saffar in 875, as well as involvement with the Kharijites and the Qarmatians.

=== Present ===
Today, most Kurds are Sunni Muslims, following the Shafiʽi or Hanafi schools of thought. Aside from the Sunni majority, there are also Kurdish Alevi Muslims and Shia Muslim minorities.

== Notable Muslim Kurds from the Middle Ages ==
The earliest Muslim Kurd known by name is a reputed companion of Muhammad, Abū Maymūn, whose name is reported as Jābān. Classical dictionaries of the Companions list him under his kunya and again under his son, the hadith narrator Maymūn al-Kurdī.

Menüçehr Mosque, the first mosque in the current borders of Turkey, was built in 1072 by the Kurdish Sunni Muslim dynasty Shaddadids.

The most famous mediaeval Kurdish Muslim was Saladin - founder of the Ayyubid Dynasty. The son of a Kurdish warrior, Saladin was born into the Kurdish Hadhabani tribe. Saladin conquered the Shia Fatimid Caliphate, restoring Sunni primacy in Egypt and the Levant; recaptured Jerusalem in 1187; and was the main leader of the Islamic forces during the Third Crusade. Apart from his political and military accomplishments, Saladin is famous for his piety, generosity, and sense of justice - a reputation he shares in both the Islamic world and the West. However, though of Kurdish origin, Saladin was raised speaking Arabic alongside Kurdish, and was fluent in both languages. As sultan, Arabic was the language of Saladin's court, and he was a great patron of Arabic arts and literature (including the works of Ibn Shaddad, Usama ibn Munqidh, Imad al-Din al-Isfahani, Ibn al-Athir, and Ibn al-Adim). After his death, the dynasty he established would be highly Arabised. However, Saladin was also a great patron of the Kurdish arts; and the Ayyubids would promote a Kurdish aristocracy across the Levant and Egypt.

After the Ayyubids were ousted by the Mamluk Sultanate, they would continue to rule in Kurdistan. The Ayyubids would continue to rule the Emirate of Hasankeyf until 1524, at which point it was abolished by the Ottomans.

Sharafkhan Bidlisi (1543–c. 1604) was a notable Kurdish Emir of Bitlis, and the author of the Sharafnama – a thorough and complete history of the Kurds. Idris Bitlisi is another famous author from the time.

== Kurdish madrasas ==
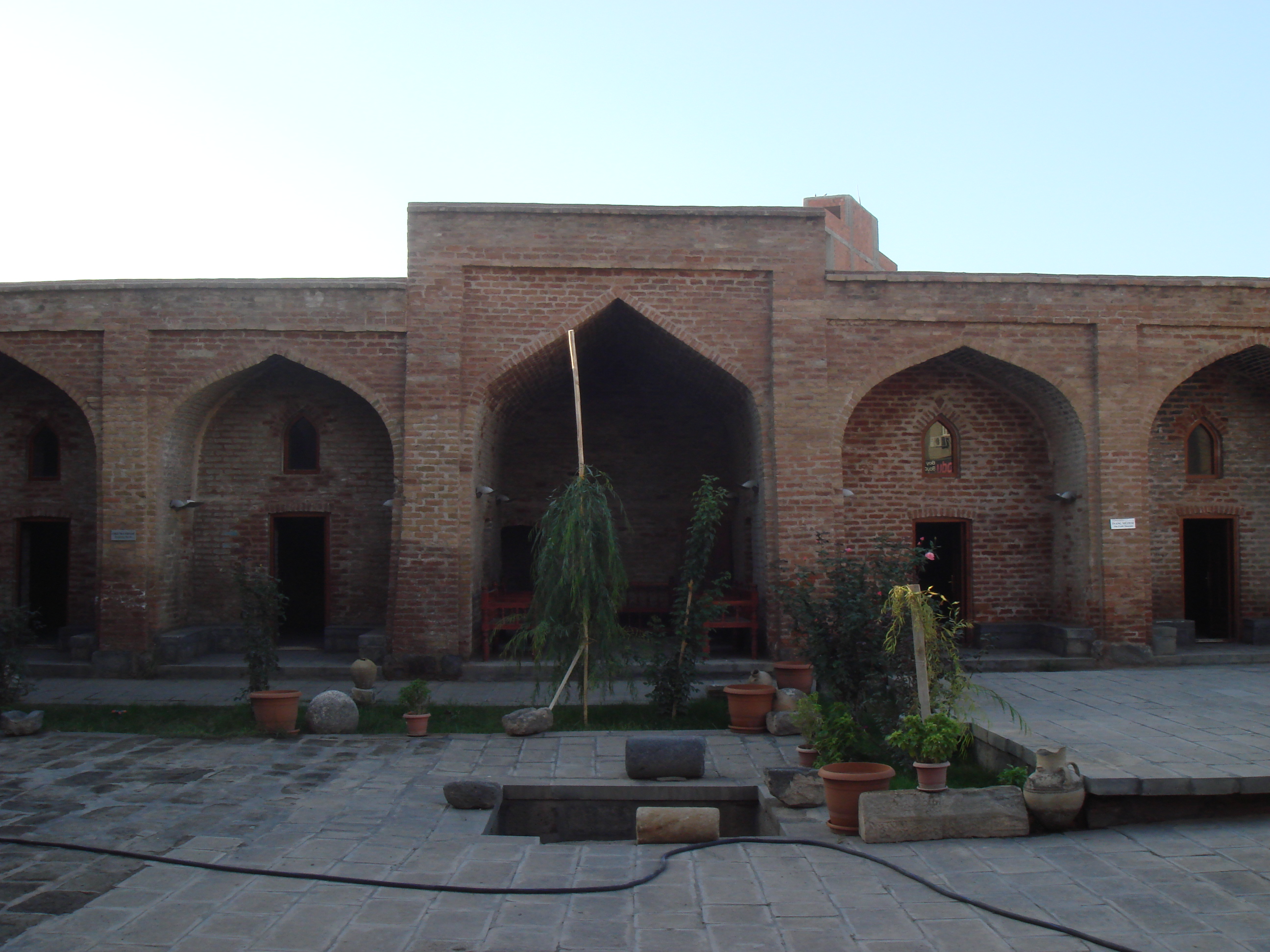
The Kurdish Red Madrasa in Cizre

With the spread of Islam in Kurdistan, a new style of civilization was formed in the region. One of the grounds of this new civilization was madrasas. The first Kurdish madrasa was formed around 950s in Hamadan, Iranian Kurdistan. However, Saladin changed the educational status of madrasas where only Islamic sciences were taught, and started to teach many branches of science there, giving more importance to Kurdish lessons.

Lessons taught in the Kurdish madrasas included Tafsir of the Quran, Hadith, Fiqh, Logic, Statute, Mathematics, Astronomy, Medicine and Philosophy. Most of the books that were used as textbooks in Kurdish madrasas were in Arabic, and they were translated to Kurdish by educationalists and experts. There was an obligation of at least one child in each household having the necessity of being educated in a madrasa among the Kurds. Around 80% of students in Kurdish madrasas were male.

== See also ==
- Spread of Islam
- Religion in Kurdistan
- Kurdish Christians
- History of the Jews in Kurdistan
