= Church of the Holy Apostles (Ani) =

Ecclesiastical monument in Turkey near the Armenian border

Coordinates: 40.508798°N 43.570685°E

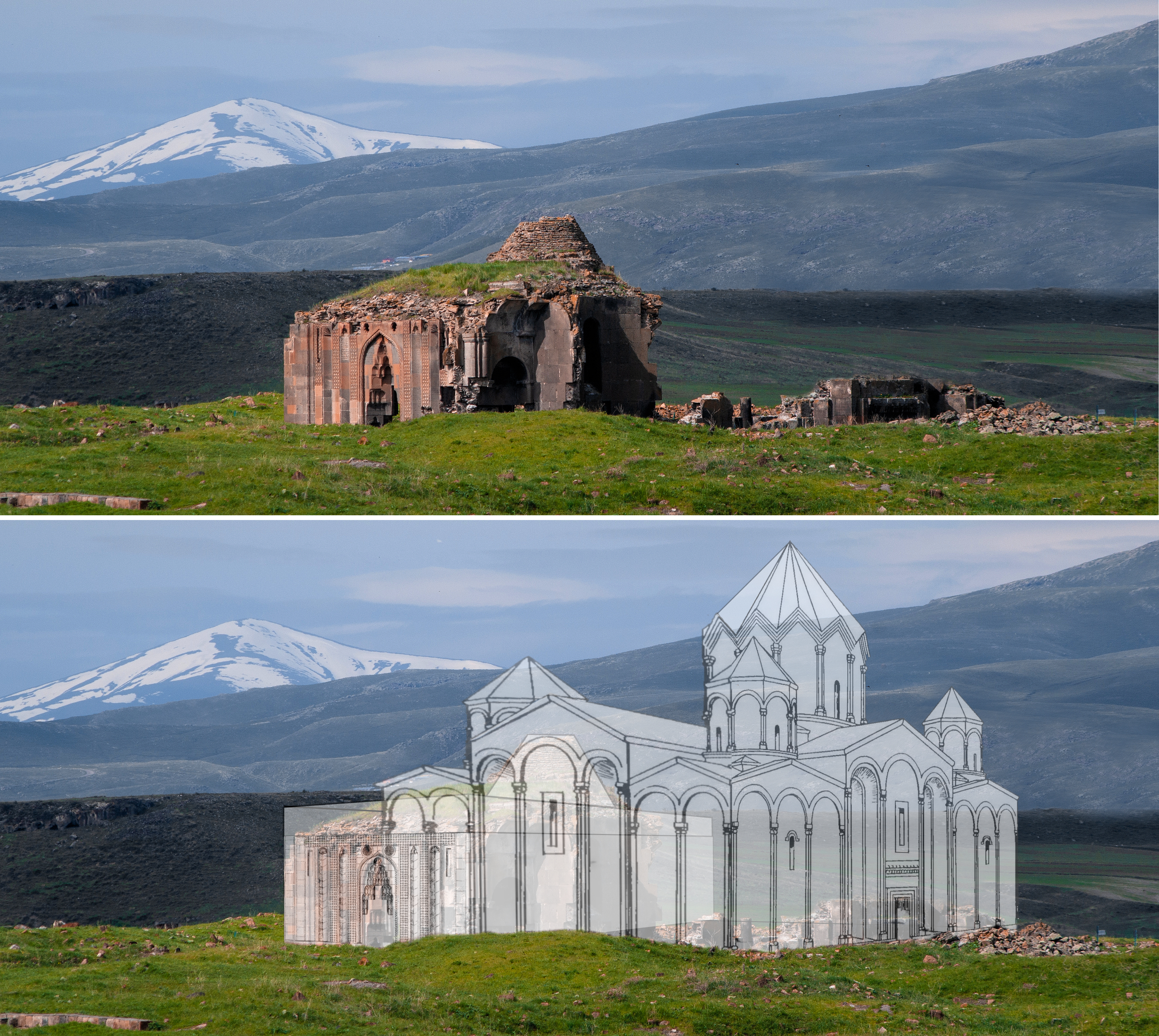
In-situ reconstruction. Top: current ruins (Seljuk gavit to the left, ruins of the Armenian church to the right). Bottom: reconstruction.

The Church of the Holy Apostles, also Arak’elots (Armenian: Սուրբ Առաքելոց եկեղեցի, Surb Arakelots yekeghets’i), is an important ecclesiastical monument of the historical city of Ani, modern Turkey, on the border with Armenia.

The church is composed in two parts: the church itself, now largely ruined, and the columned gavit in front of it, remaining in large part.

The remains of the gavit are clearly derived from Seljuk architectural designs.

== The church (c. 1031) ==
The church itself was built before 1031, date of a now lost inscription over the south entrance to the church, which was left by Abughamir Pahlavuni, a local Armenian prince. The plan of the church is essentially classical Armenian, forming an inscribed quadriconch, with the four cardinal axes each terminating in an apse. This type of plan was already known in the 6th-7th centuris as a Jvari-type in Georgian and Hripsime-type in Armenian architecture. The church plan is also unique in that it is composed of five domes: four smaller domes in the corner chapels, and one large central dome. This slightly archaising architectural type is typical of earlier periods in Georgia and Armenia, and is found again in the Aghtamar, built in 915–921, the Otkhta Eklesia built in 960–980, or in the neighbouring King Gagik's church of St Gregory in Ani, built in 1001. Some surfaces were decorated with acanthus designs, another archaising trait. The dedicatory inscription in Armenian on top of the entrance to the church reads:

In 480 (i.e. 1031), by the Grace of God, I, Abughamir, son of Vahram, Prince of Princes, have given the camp of Carnut to the Saint Apostoles, for the health and prolongation of the life of my brother Grigor.

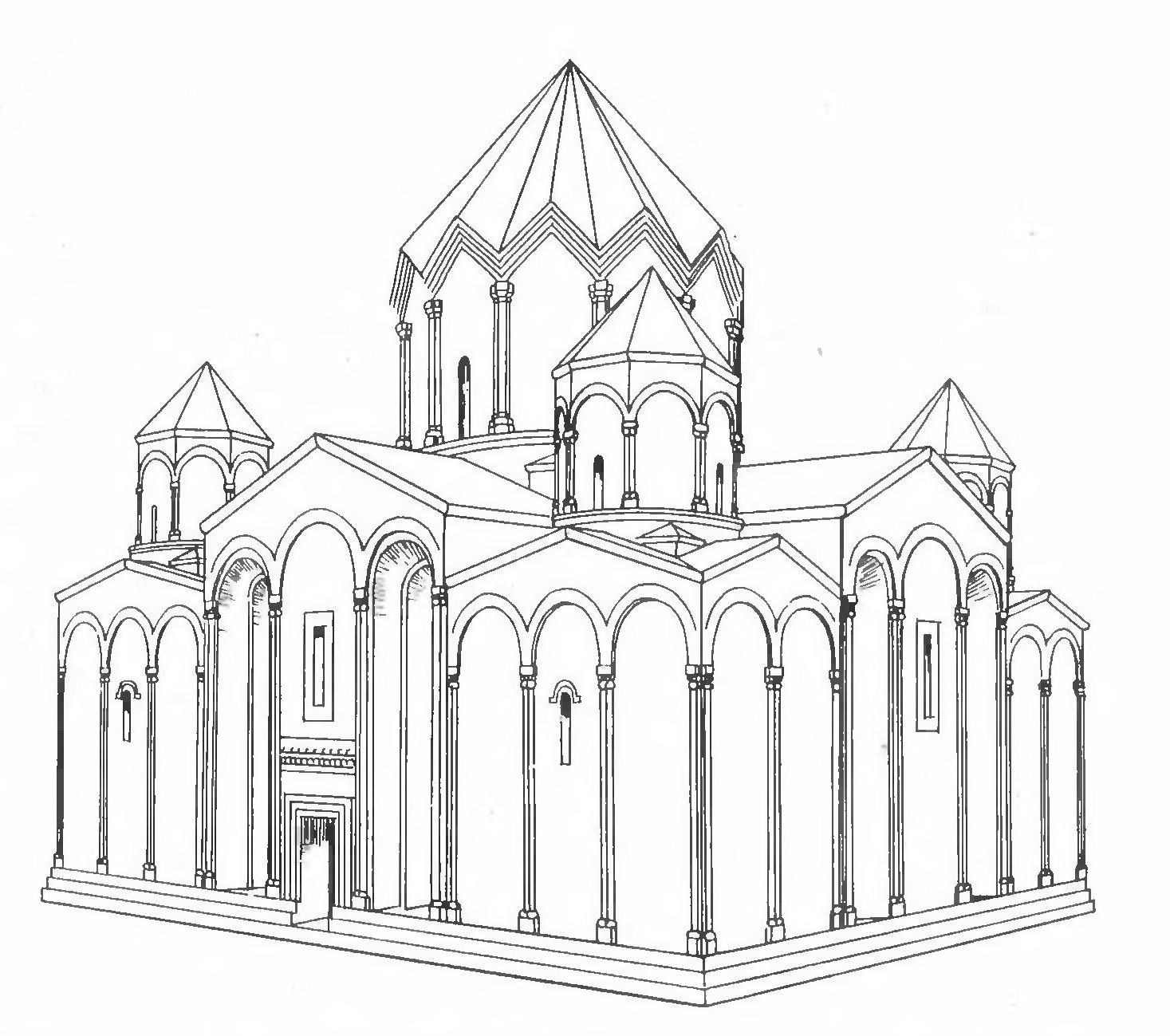
The church before the construction of the gavit in front

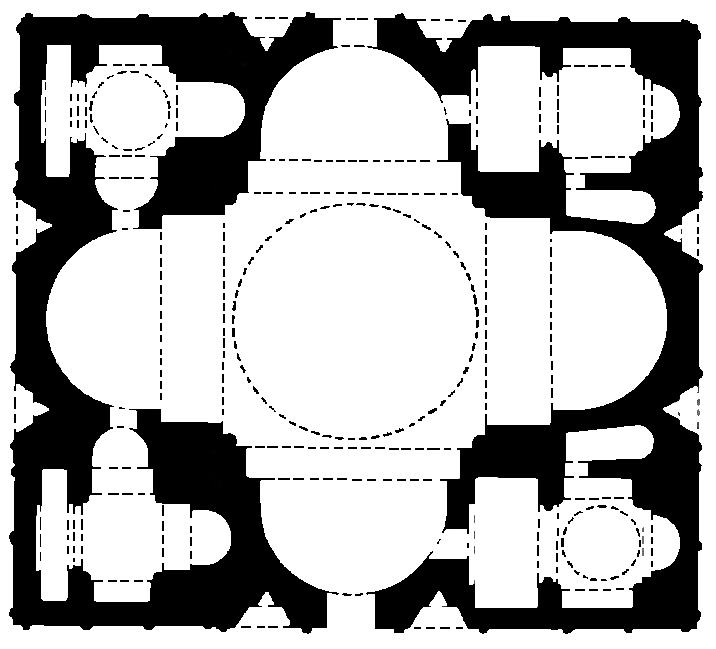
Detailed plan of the church

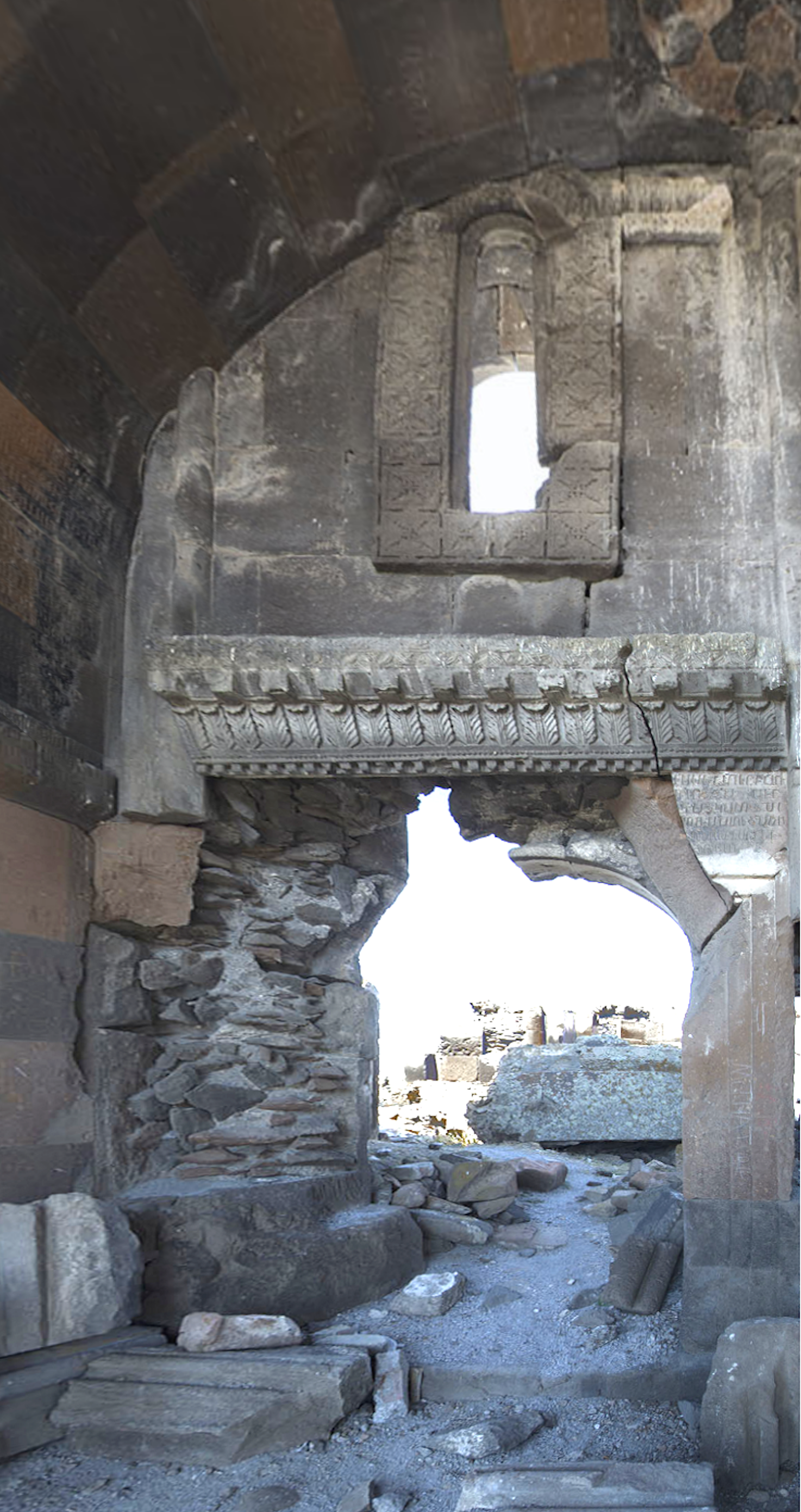
Entrance gate of the old church with a lintel decorated with acanthus leaves, and a dedicatory inscription. View from outside the church, from inside the gavit

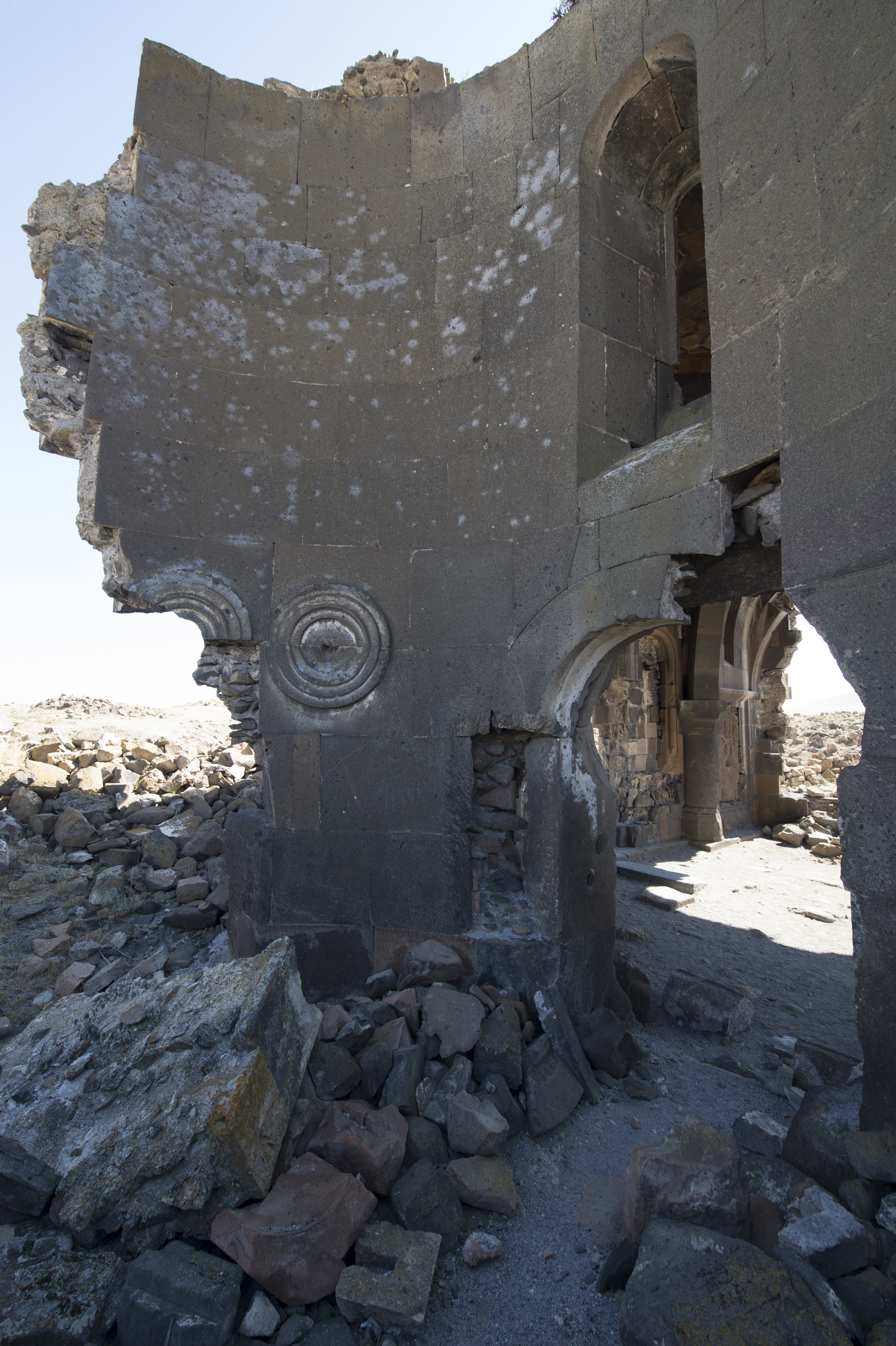
Gate of the old church, viewed from inside the church

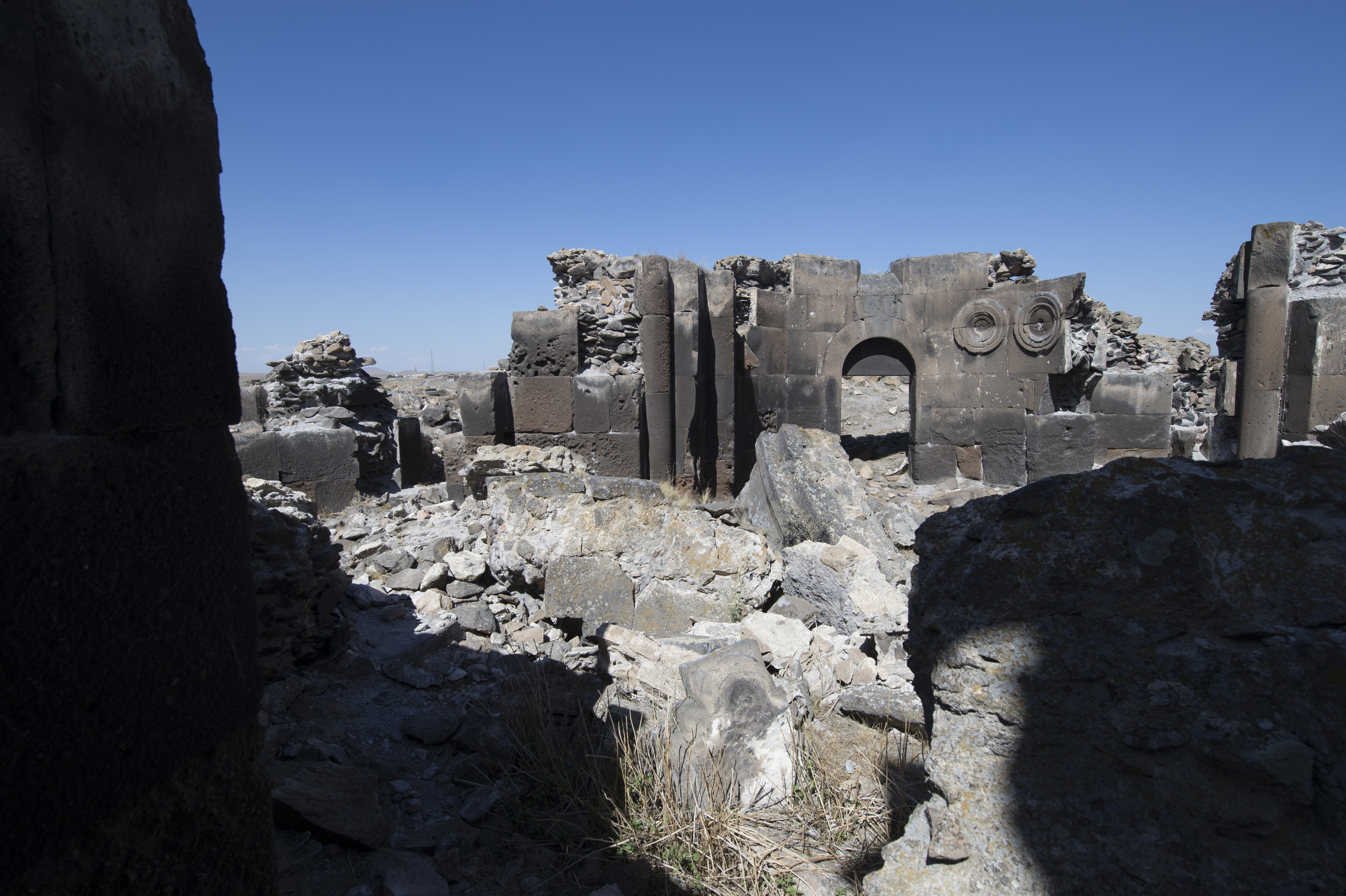
Remains of the Church (interior to north apse)

== The gavit or narthex (1031-1215) ==
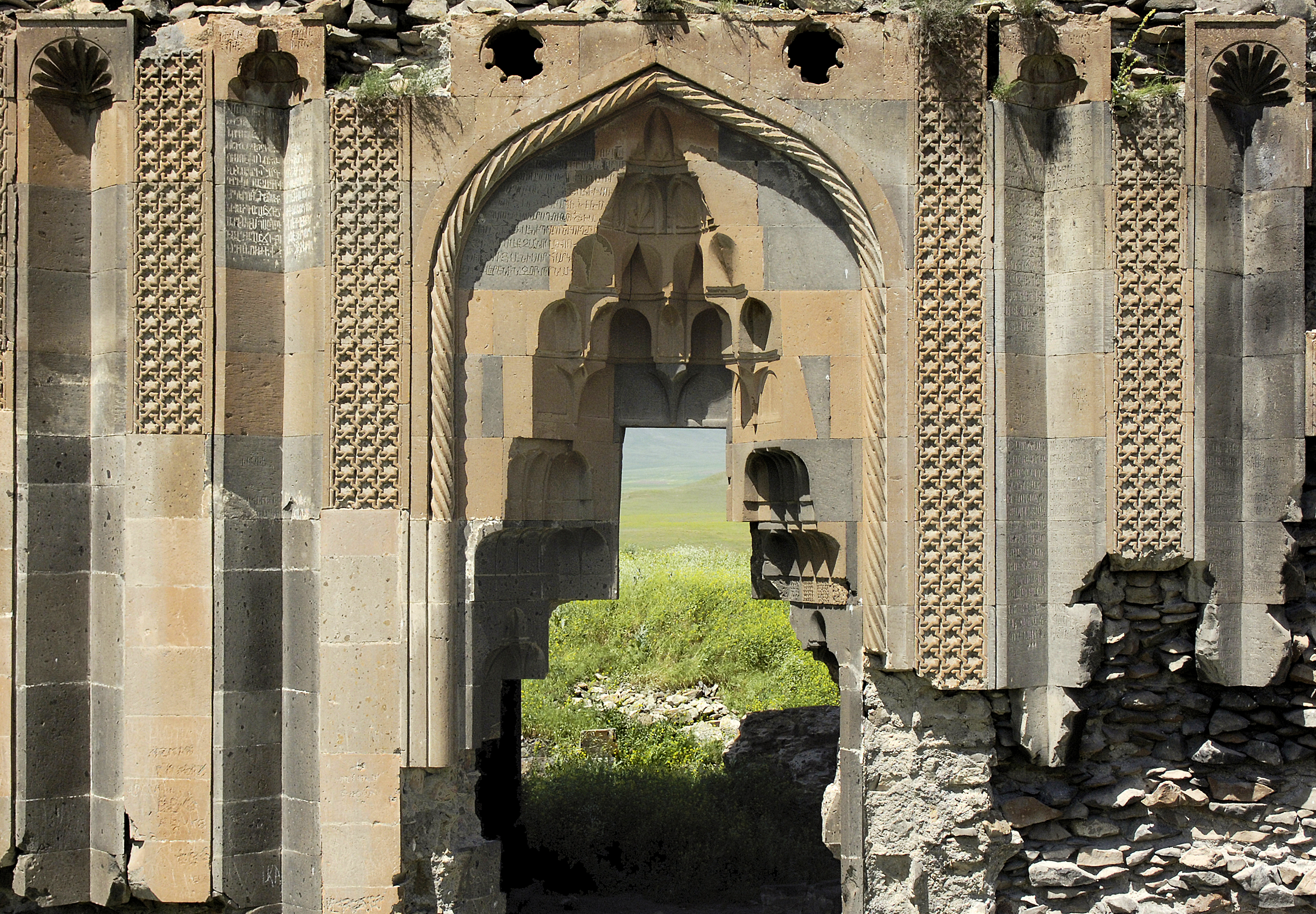
Seljuk-style muqarnas at the entrance portal of the Church of the Holy Apostles (east façade of the gavit, built after the 1031 church, but before 1215, date of the earliest inscription on the gavit). This design is similar to the tomb of Mama Hatun at Tercan, c.1200.

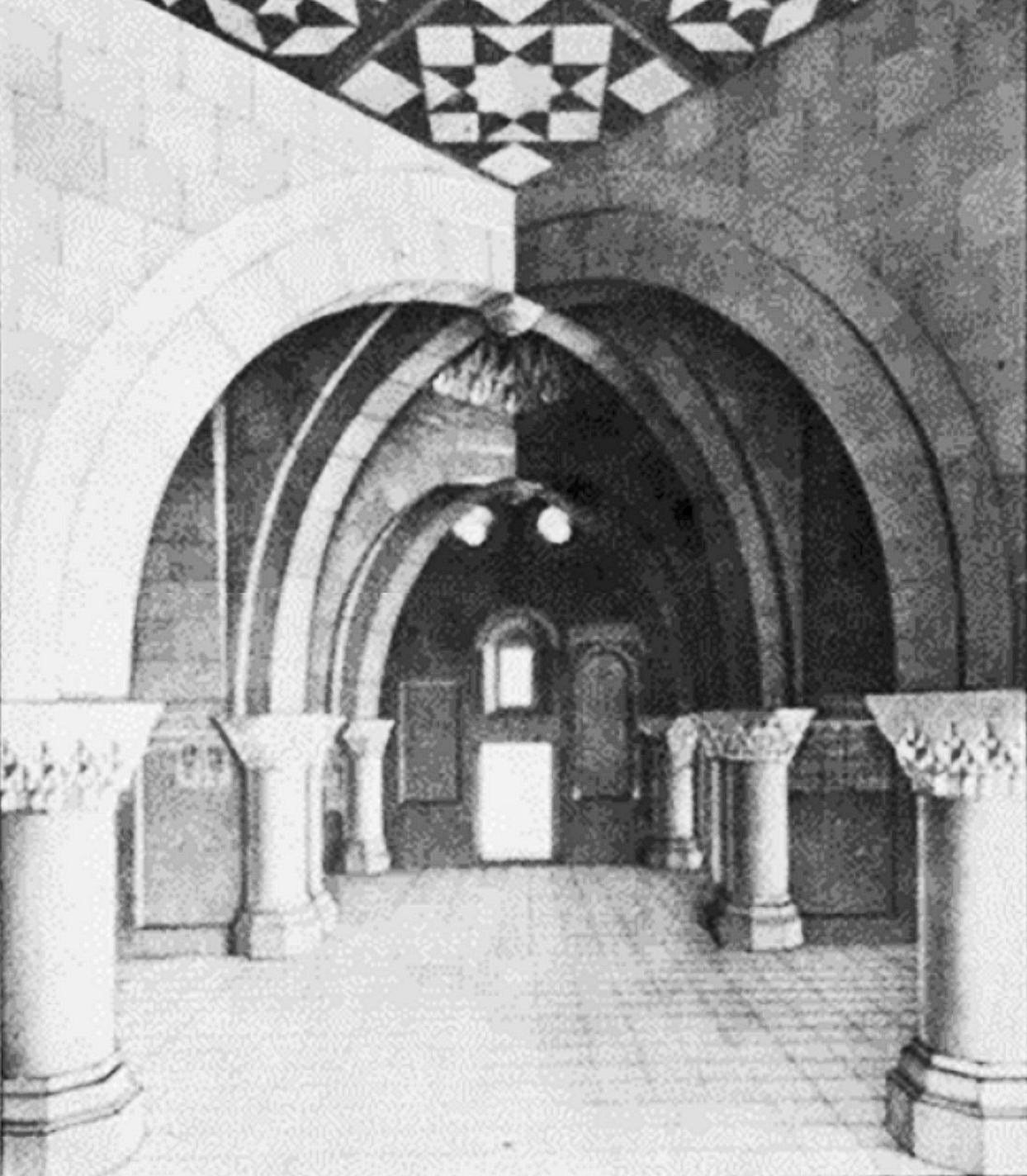
Reconstruction of the inside of the gavit, by Toros Toramanian.

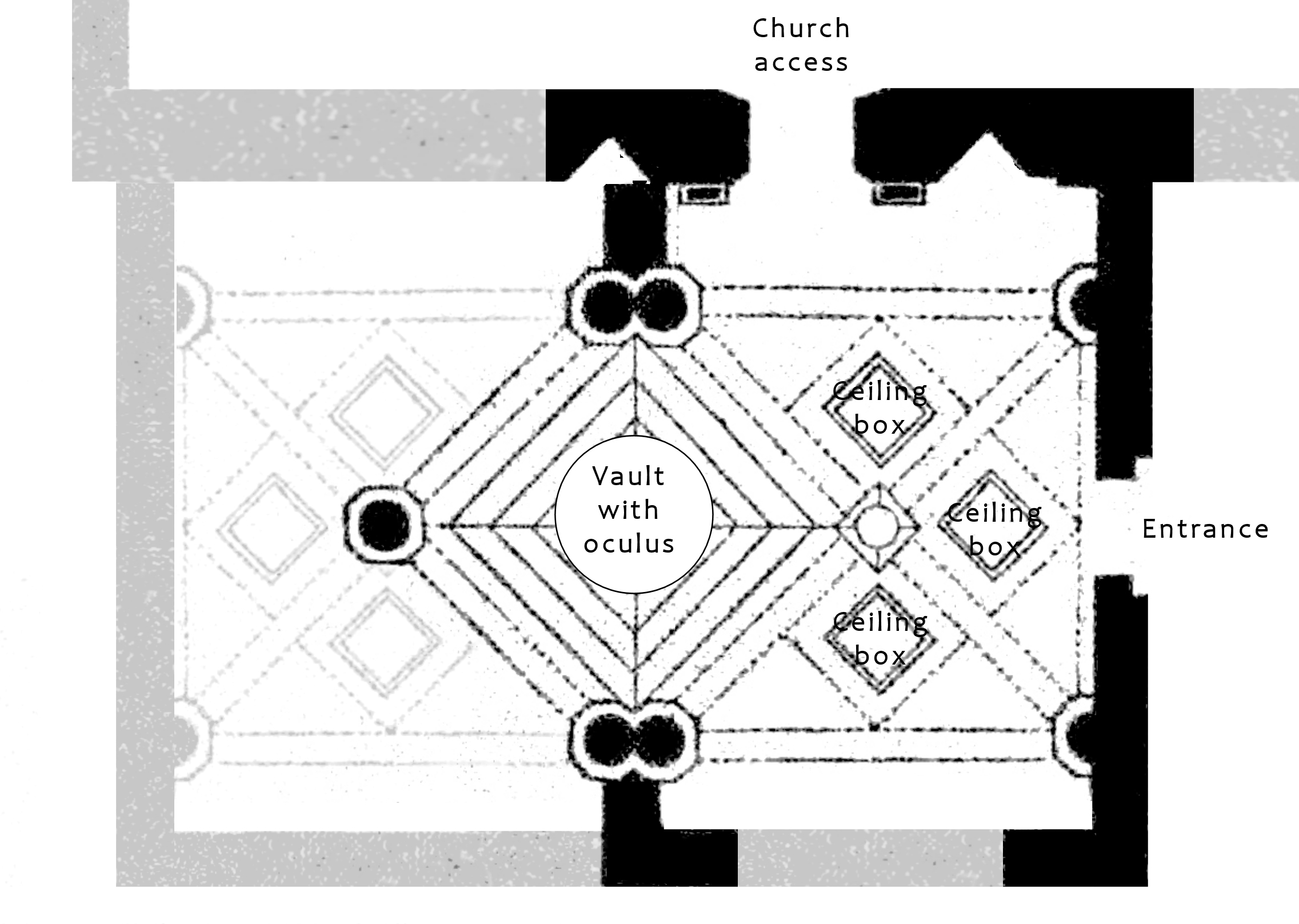
Plan of gavit. Ruined parts in grey.

Having a columned gavit or zhamatun at the entrance of a church, where it serves as an entrance room to the church and an assembly room or mausoleum, is a very common occurrence in Armenia, but the gavit of the Church of the Holy Apostles at Ani is very original in that it uses the styles of Seljuk architecture, rather than traditional Armenian medieval architecture. The gavit or zhamatun of the Church of the Holy Apostles was built later than the church (which was built around 1031, date of its first inscription), but before 1215, date of the earliest dated inscription visible on the walls of the gavit. It clearly derived from Seljuk architectural designs. The plan of the gavit is rather typical of Armenian medieval architecture, formed from two perpendicular pairs of arches leaving a central square vault with a central oculus. The central square vault is decorated with muqarnas stone "stalactites". Only the eastern face of the gavit remains. It is composed of a central porch with a muqarnas niche, flanked by four thin niches, triangular in section. The surface of the wall is decorated with a geometric interlace of eight-pointed stars.

The overall design of this wall is very similar to the design of the gate of the Mama Hatun mausoleum at Tercan, dated to c. 1200, and belonging to the Seljuk Saltukids dynasty. The vault design is also similar to that of the Bagnayr Monastery, which is dated by an inscription to 1201, supporting a date of around 1200 for the zhamatun of the Church of the Holy Apostoles.

In 1064, the Seljuk sultan Alp Arslan took the city of Ani from the Byzantines (who had themselves taken it from the Bagratids barely twenty years earlier in 1045). The Seljuks then gave the city as a concession to their vassal, the Turkified Kurdic dynasty of the Shaddadids, in 1072. The first Shaddadid Bey of Ani, called Ebul Manuçehr (ruled c. 1072-1118) claimed to have rebuilt Ani, and therefore took the title "Emir Ebu’l Muammeran". He left what is called today the "Emir Ebu’l Muammeran Complex" at Ani. His son Shaddadid Şahinşah (r.1118–1124) built a small mosque at the center of the complex, between 1164 and 1200. The mosque was destroyed completely in 1917, and only some ruins of the minaret remain. The Georgians made multiple attempts to recover the city, until Queen Tamar succeeded in 1199 CE.

The style of the vault is considered as similar to that of the Menucihr Mosque at the entrance of the citadel at Ani, built between 1072 and 1086 by the first Shaddadids ruler of Ani Manuchihr ibn Shavur, suggesting broadly similar dates and circumstances. A stylistically similar structure also exists at Horomos Monastery, the "Mausoleum of Aruits", built in 1277 as identified by an inscription.

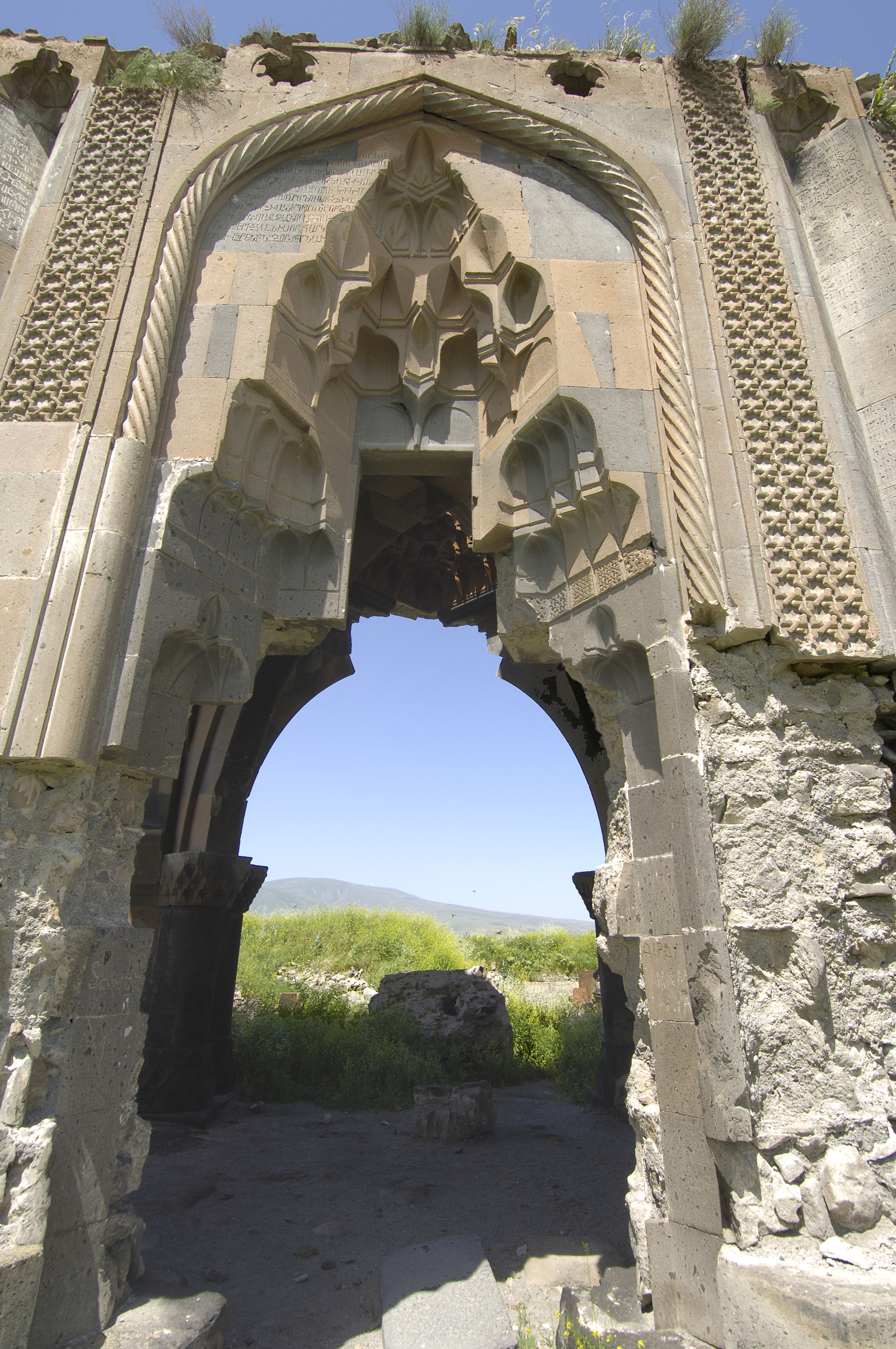
Eastern entrance gate with muqarnas

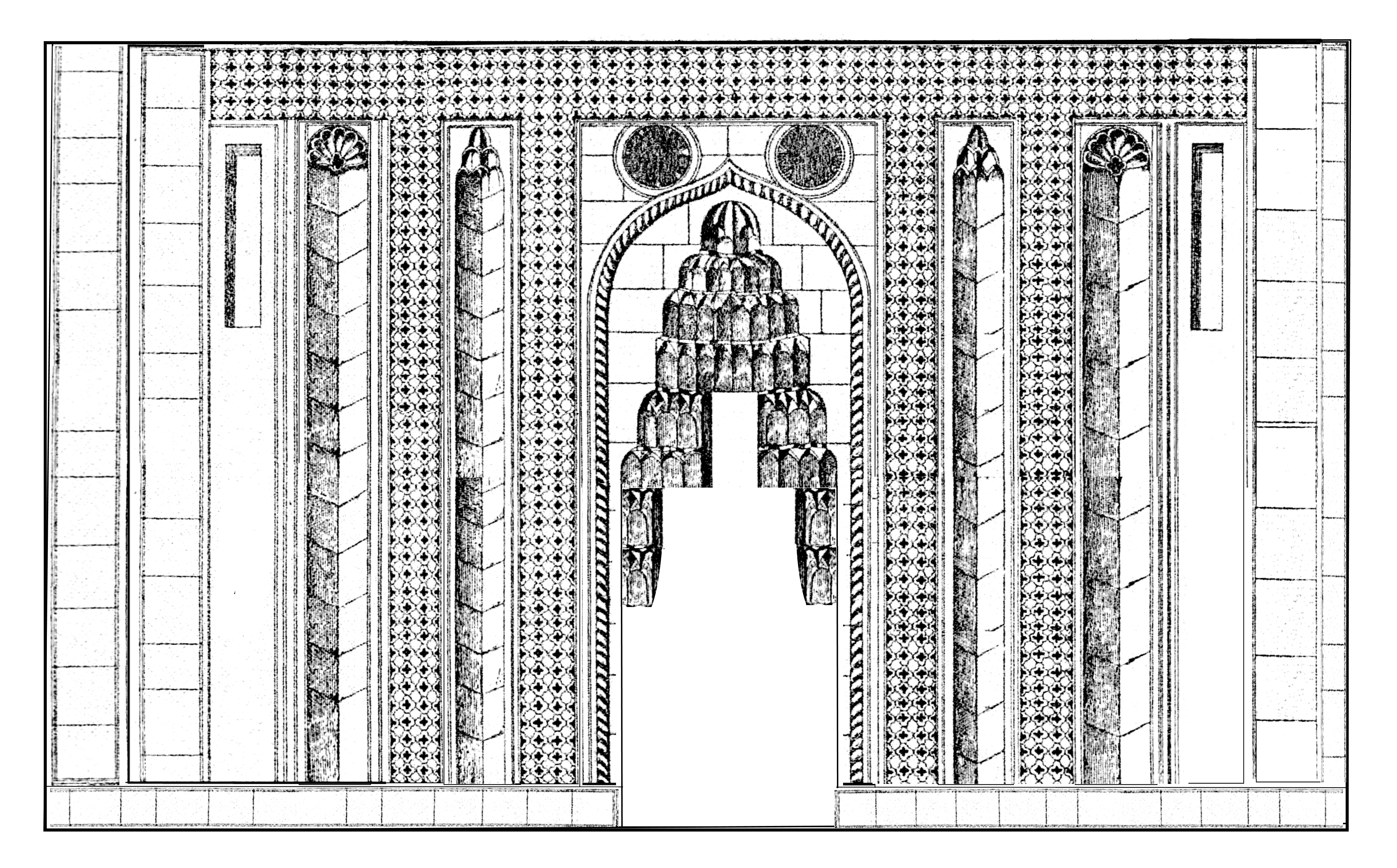
Eastern side of the Seljuk gavit, with entrance

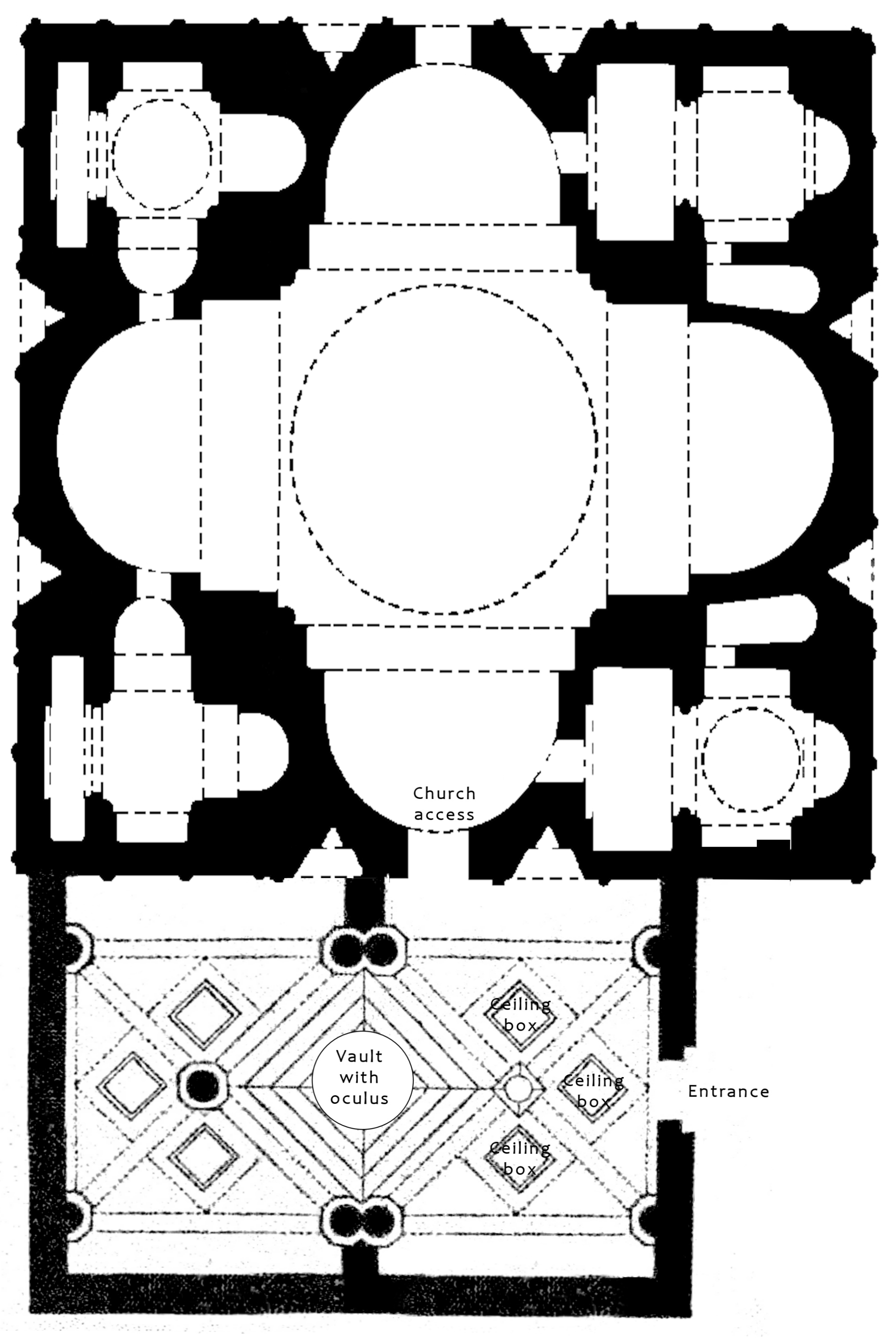
Plan of the church and the gavit. The church followed a traditional Byzantine design, while the gavit in front of it was in Seljuk caravanserai style.

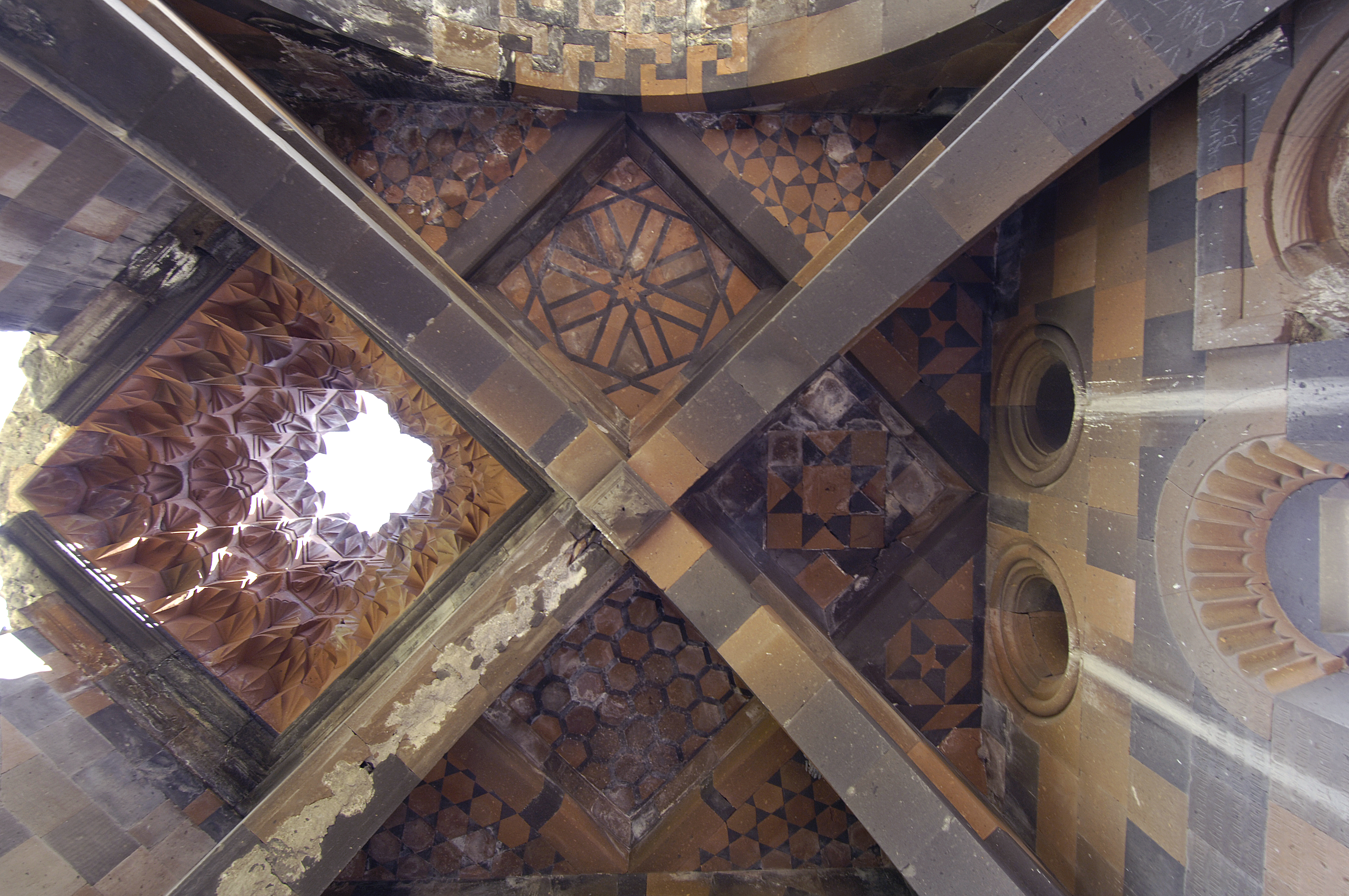
Design of the roof of the gavit. Muqarnas door to the right, roof with three ceiling boxes and an ex-centered vault.

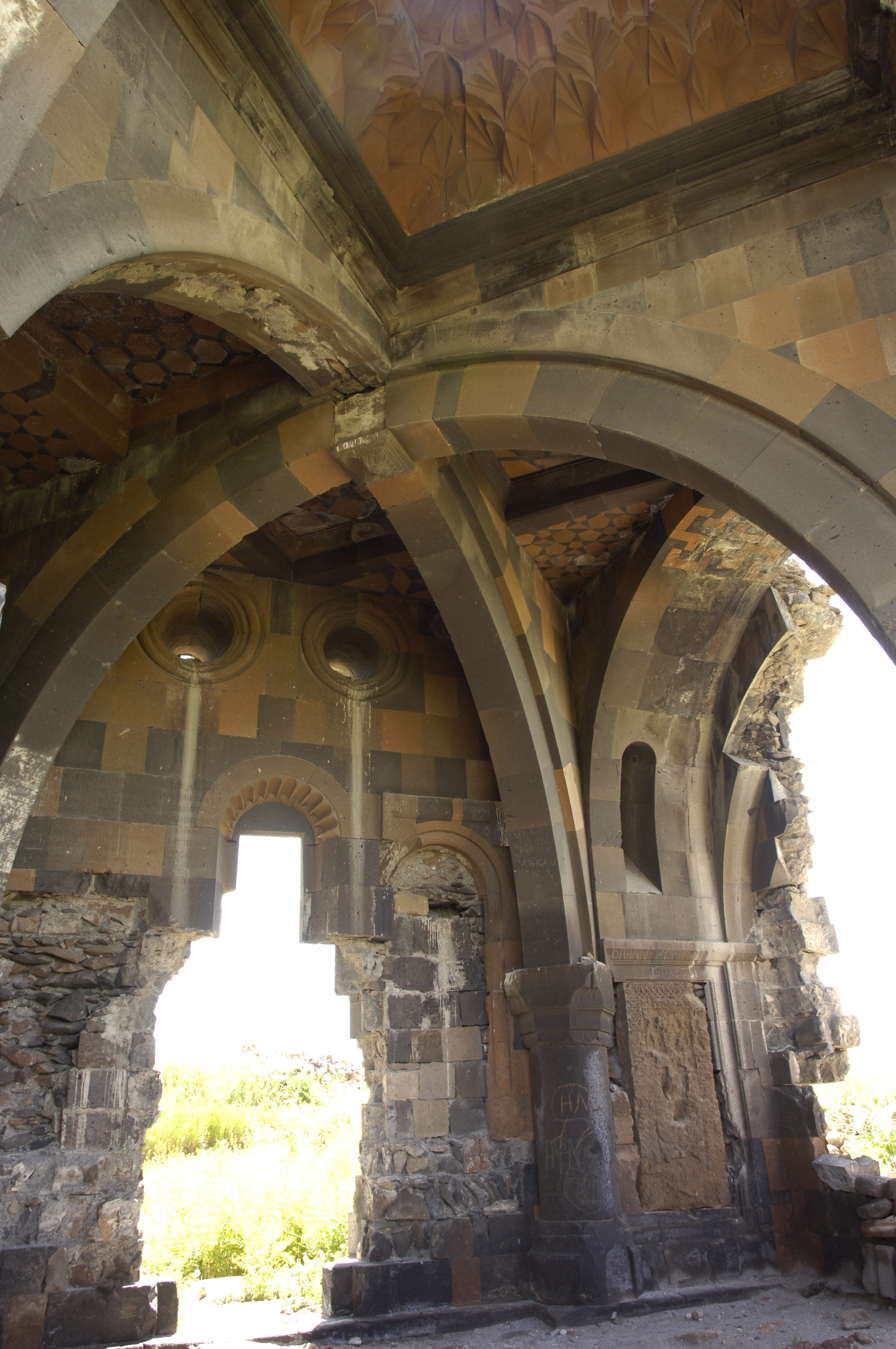
Entrance with Muqarna (viewed from the inside)

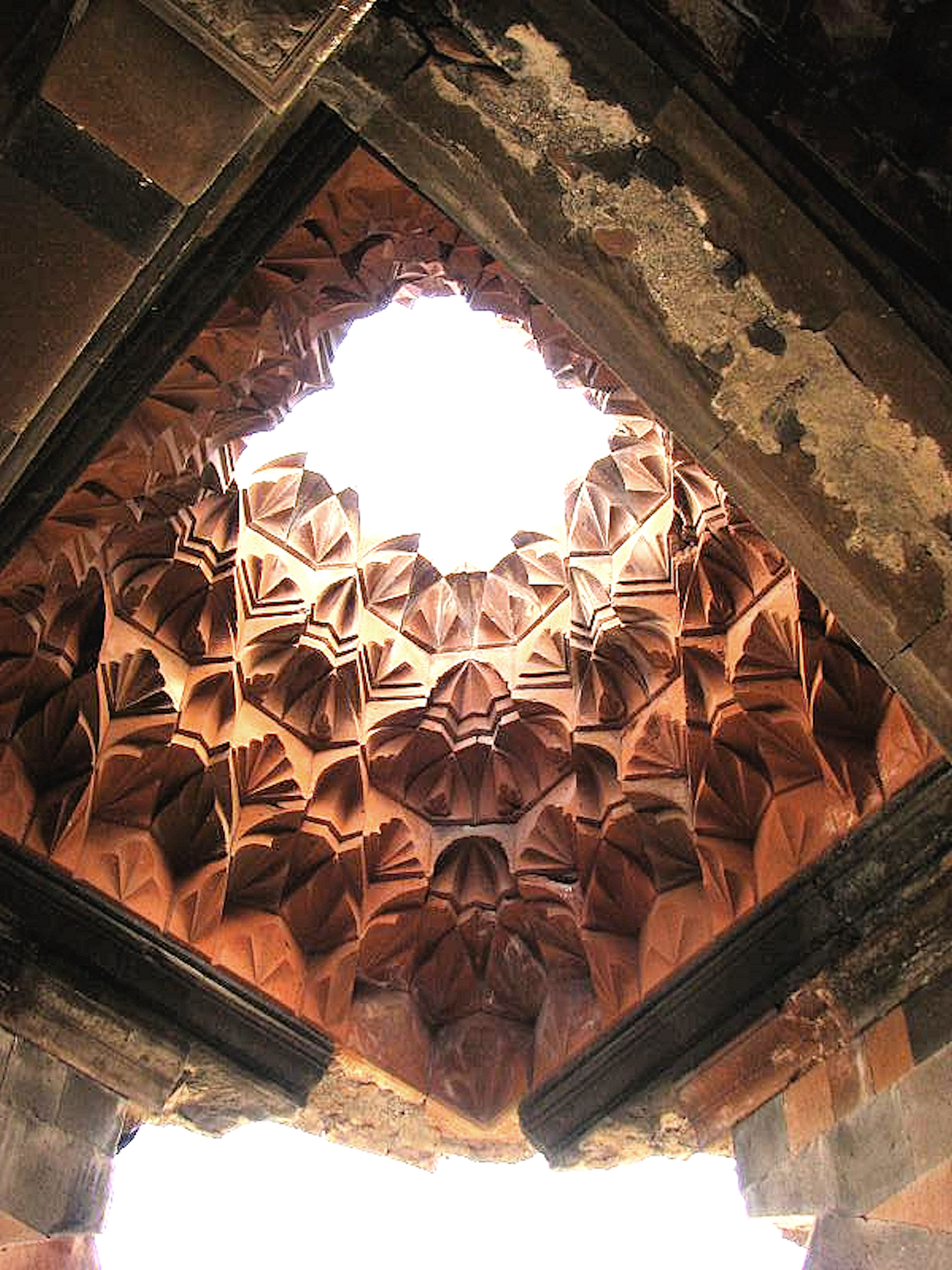
Vault design with 360° Muqarna

=== Adoption of muqarnas styles in Armenian art ===
Armenian architecture in the 13th century also made use of muqarnas decorative elements, and sometimes had complete muqarnas vaults with a central erdik or oculus, spurred by the influence of contemporary Islamic architecture. Examples of this can be found in the Geghard Monastery, Gandzasar Monastery, or Astvatsankal Monastery (all in present-day Armenia), and at the Church of St Gregory of the Illuminator or the Bagnayr Monastery in Ani. In many of these examples, muqarnas vaults are recurring features in the gavits (narthexes) of the churches, which were the locus of much innovation and experimentation in medieval Armenian architecture. These borrowings of Islamic architectural motifs may have been due to either Ilkhanid or Seljuk influences in the region, although the wide geographic spread of muqarnas usage in this period makes it difficult to pinpoint any specific influence with certainty.

The muqarnas motif was clearly inspired by Islamic sources, but it was used differently, and the Armenian muqarnas vault with oculus was not found in the Muslim world until it was copied about a century later, as in the vault of the Yakutiye Madrasa in nearby Erzurum (1310).

== Il-Khanate imperial decrees ==
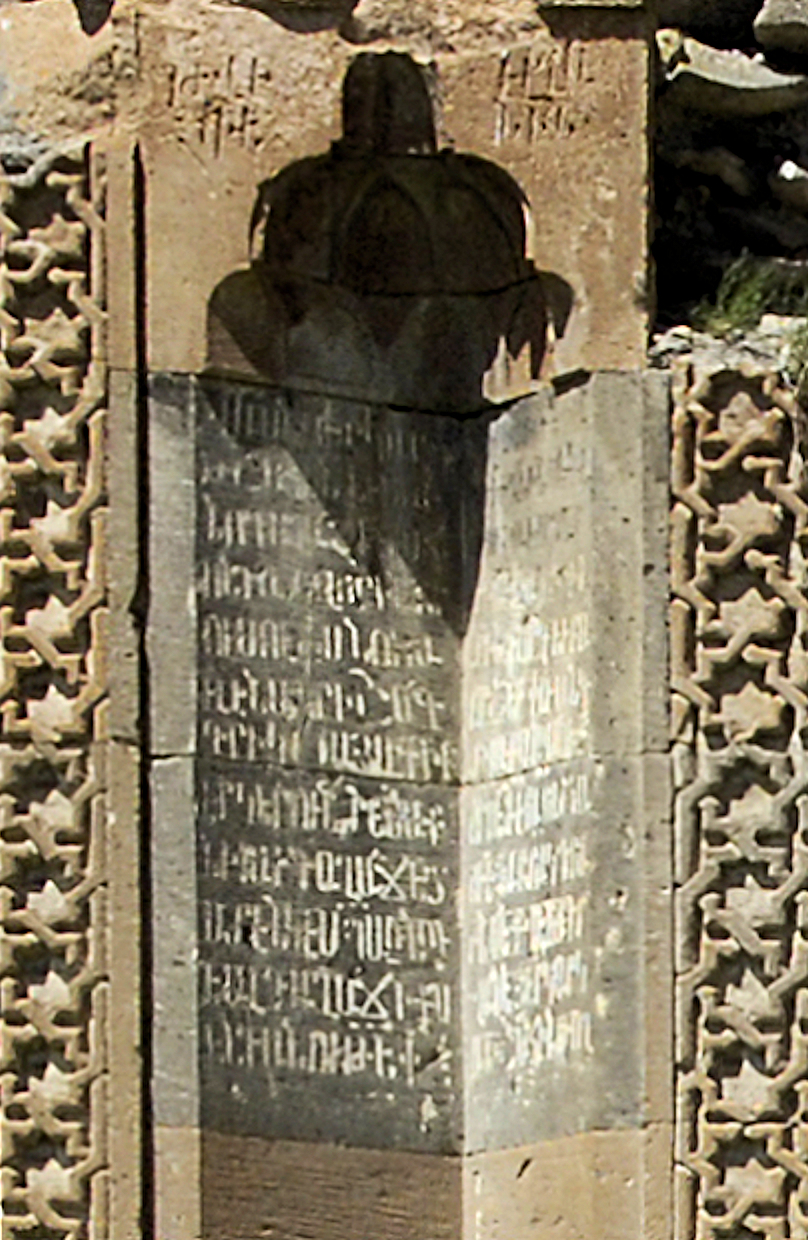
Stone charter of the Il-Khanate, in the Armenian language. Holy Apostles church (gavit), 1276.

Ani was under Armenian Zakarid and nominal Georgian control for a few decades after 1199, until the Mongol conquests of 1236. The Zakarids submitted to the Mongols and were allowed to retain their lands, but remained under Mongol suzerainty, especially after 1256 when the Il-khanate formally absorded Armenia. The Il-khanate managed taxation, and there are six inscriptions at the Church of the Holy apostle, dealing with tax edicts in the name of the Il-khan.

From around 1260, with the Mongol Il-Khanate control of the city and suzerainty over the local Zakarid dynasty, the gavit seems to have been use as some sort of legal office in charge of taxes and import duties. Several official announcements, often yarlighs (imperial decrees), using the formulation "[In the name of] the Ilkhan", have been inscribed on the walls of the gavit. In these inscriptions the Armenian language is used, but the format and even the terminology are Mongol.

An inscription in the name of the Il-Khan is dated 1269, and reports the cancellation of taxes:

718 (ie 1269). (In the name) of the Il-khan.
By the grace of God, we, customs officers, for the longevity of our masters, Sahip-Divan, Sahmad and Qarimadin, have removed from Ani the tax for priests that this city did not pay not originally; we confirm (this exemption again). No one has the right to demand tax, whatever nationality or family he may be. The one who [said] otherwise or who bothers to [request] the tax, is cursed by the 318 Fathers; those who observe] (this) are blessed by God. I[srael the writer].

— Inscription of 1269.

Another one in 1276:

In 725 (ie 1276). (In the name) of the Il-khan.
For the longevity of the Padishah and the Saïp-Divan, we, customs officers of Ani: Hindutchakh, (who) is the son of the lord judge, Oussup from Za[ta], Gorg from Nouât, and the mercer Baulé, and the gdrik of the oven, we gave this writing to the controllers (?) of Ani, having noticed that they were encouraged by unfair customs officials, and we have removed (them). They perceived on each beast of burden half of its charge (?); we, the aforementioned customs officers, have abolished (this) for the longevity of the Padishah.

— Inscription in the name of the Il-Khan (1276).

Also in the name of the Il-Khan, an inscription by Bishop Mkhithar, dated to circa 1276, under the authority of dom Sargis and Malik Phakhradin, prohibiting commerce on Sundays in the street, following an earthquake that year (located in one of the alcoves of the gavit).

In the name of the Il-khan. By the grace of God, under the government of this city, under the superiority of Dom Sarguis, and under the authority of the melik Phakhradin, I Bishop Mkhithar, originally from Teglier, because of the earthquake that took place these days, we have eliminated the Sunday trade in the street. [He who] opposes this writing, great or small, is responsible for sins of this city.

== Other inscriptions ==
Other important inscriptions in the Church of the Holy Apostles include:

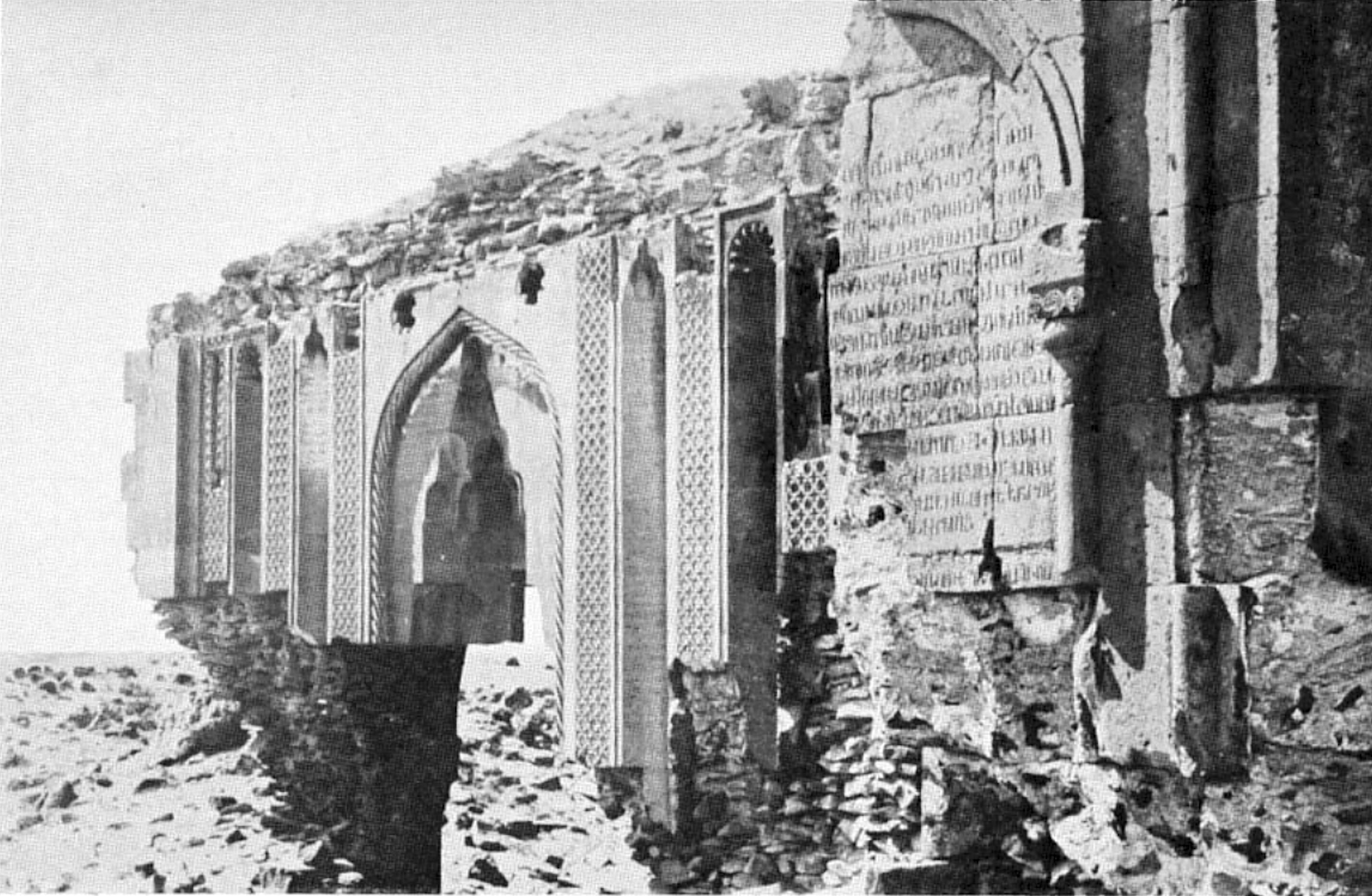
Inscription of 1217, by Archbishop dom Grigor, son of Apughamr.

- A 1217 inscription by Archibishop dom Grigor, son of Apughamr, announcing the cancellation of taxes for Shirak Province and the churches of Ani.
- A 1253-1276 inscription by Agbugha I, son of Shahnshah I lamenting about high taxes in Ani (this is the inscription just above the gate of the gavit, above the muqarnas decoration).
- A 1303 inscription by Agbugha II, son of Ivane II, lamenting about the high level of taxes, and announcing the cancellation of several of them.
- A 1320 inscription by Princess Kuandze, wife of Shahnshah II Zakarian (inside the gavit, on the inside of the arcade next to the gate of the church).
- A 1348 inscription by a certain Chapadin, son of Hovhannes, donating gift for the monks of the church (inside wall of the gavit).

== See also ==
- Armenian medieval sculpture
