= Kurdish communities in the former Ayyubid Sultanate =

The Kurdish communities in the former Ayyubid Sultanate refers to ethnic Kurds, who descend from Kurdish settlers from mainland Kurdistan, living in countries which were formerly part of the Ayyubid Sultanate. As they lived in these countries prior to the independence and establishment of the modern-nation states, they are citizens of their countries and considered locals.

== History ==
=== Syria ===
Besides the native Kurdish population in northeastern Syria, more Kurdish communities were established throughout Syria during the Ayyubid period. Kurds particularly settled in cities such as Damascus, Aleppo, Homs, and Hama. Many Ayyubid princes of Homs supported the resettlement of loyal Kurdish tribal elements to consolidate their rule and garrison frontier zones.

A famous Kurdish quarter in Damascus was named Hārat al-Akrād (“Quarter of the Kurds”), established during the Ayyubid era. The Kurdish quarter persisted into the Ottoman period and became part of the Al-Salihiyah after Syrian independence. Kurdish influence was visible in the religious, military, and legal circles of Damascus during the Ayyubid era.

The Crusader frontier encouraged Kurdish tribal settlement in northern Syria, particularly in regions near Krak des Chevaliers, where Qal'at al-Akrād (“Castle of the Kurds”) was named after a garrison of Kurdish troops established there by the early 12th century. Although the castle was later held by the Crusaders and renamed Krak des Chevaliers, the surrounding region retained Kurdish settlers into later periods.

=== Iraq ===
Besides the native Kurds of northern Iraq, the Jazira region of Iraq, which already had longstanding Kurdish populations prior to the Ayyubids, experienced renewed Kurdish settlement during the 12th and 13th centuries. Kurdish tribal elements were mainly involved in the defense and administration of frontier towns between the Ayyubid and Seljuk spheres of influence. Cities such as Mosul and Sinjar were centers of Kurdish migration and control. The Zangid and later Ayyubid rulers of Mosul encouraged the resettlement of loyal Kurdish tribes as a buffer against Turkmen and Bedouin incursions. The influence of Kurdish mir families expanded during this time and continued into the Ottoman period until the British mandate.

=== Palestine ===
Kurdish soldiers and administrators settled in Jerusalem, Nablus, and especially Hebron during Saladin’s conquest of the region from Crusader rule. A famous urban relic of this presence is the Kurdish Quarter in Jerusalem, which was established to house Kurdish soldiers and their families in the aftermath of the 1187 campaign. The quarter persisted until the Ottoman era but continued to be inhabited by many descendants.

In Hebron, Saladin appointed Kurdish governors and entrusted Kurdish guards to the sanctuaries, notably the Ibrahimi Mosque. Their presence reinforced both military control and religious legitimacy, given the city’s symbolic importance in Islamic tradition. The Kurdish presence in Palestine was the strongest in Hebron. In the 21st century, descendants of the Kurdish settlers continued to form a significant portion of Hebron.

=== Jordan ===
During the Ayyubid period, Jordan was integrated into the southern Levantine frontier of the Ayyubid realm. The fortress of Karak Castle, a major stronghold once held by the Crusaders, was taken by Saladin in 1188 and subsequently became a garrison point for troops loyal to the Ayyubids. Kurdish soldiers and tribal auxiliaries were among the contingents settled in and around Karak to maintain order and defend the vital route linking Egypt to Damascus. Some Kurdish leaders established military colonies in the Ajlun–Karak corridor, especially during the reign of Al-Mu'azzam Isa, the Ayyubid ruler of Damascus. He reinforced the garrisons in this region with Kurds to counter Crusader attacks from Transjordan and to secure the road networks. Kurdish families retained awareness of their ethnic origins into the Mamluk and early Ottoman periods. Ottoman-era census and tax records for the Balqa and Ajlun regions mention “Akrād” (Kurds) as distinct ethnic identifiers in certain villages. Many Arab tribes in the rural Transjordanian highlands preserved oral traditions referencing “Akrād warriors” who fought for the Ayyubids and later served as local protectors and landholders.

=== Egypt ===
The Kurdish presence in Egypt began after Ayyubid rule in 1169. While the Ayyubid ruling class in Egypt was mostly Kurdish in origin, the broader Kurdish presence in Egypt was militarily and administratively structured. Kurdish soldiers and commanders were rewarded with iqṭāʿs (land grants), especially in Upper Egypt and the outskirts of Cairo.

Kurds in Cairo were often concentrated in specific quarters. While some maintained distinct linguistic and cultural traits, many gradually assimilated into the dominant Arab-speaking milieu. Claude Cahen noted that by the 13th century, Kurdish ethnicity had largely been diluted through intermarriage, language shift, and integration into the state bureaucracy. Nevertheless, families of Kurdish descent continued to occupy elite positions well into the Mamluk and early Ottoman periods, and many individual Kurdish families in Egypt did not assimilate.

Egyptian sources such as al-Maqrīzī mentioned Kurdish groups by name, and Kurdish origins remained a marker of prestige among certain families. Kurdish participation in religious and Sufi life was also noted, particularly in urban centers where Kurds founded or patronized institutions such as madrasas and khanqahs.

In by the 20th century, the descendants of Ayyubid Kurdish settlers in Egypt largely assimilated into the population. Only a few families associated with Kurdish heritage. The legacy of Kurdishness was more symbolic, often invoked in reference to Saladin.
