= Menucihr Mosque =

Mosque in Turkey

Menûçihr Camii
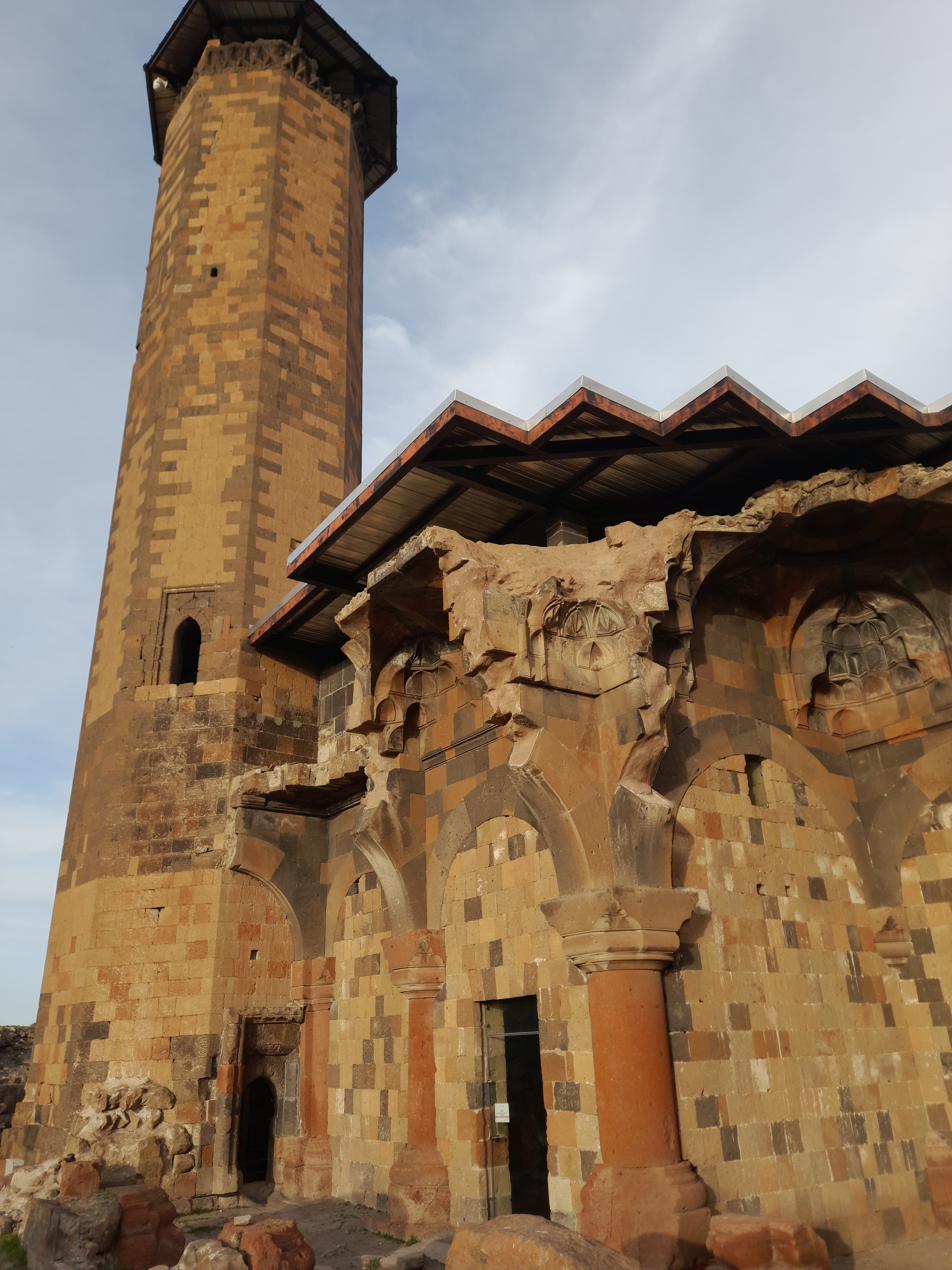
- The first mosque built in Anatolia (modern day Turkey)

- Location within Turkey

Religion
- Affiliation: Islam
- Province: Kars

Location
- Location: Kars Province
- Coordinates: 40°30′36″N 43°34′12″E

Architecture
- Type: Mosque
- Style: Islamic Architecture
- Groundbreaking: 1072
- Completed: 1086
- Minaret: 1

Menucihr Mosque, also Manučehr Mosque (Kurdish: Mizgefta Menûçêhr) is a mosque in the medieval city of Ani in Kars Province, Turkey. It was built between 1072 and 1086 by Manuchihr ibn Shavur of the Kurdish Shaddadid dynasty. The restoration of the mosque started in June 2020.

== Style ==
The style of the vault is considered as similar to that of the gavit or zhamatun of the Church of the Holy Apostles at Ani (built before 1217), suggesting broadly similar dates and circumstances.

== Inscriptions ==
A kufic inscription in a long band on its left façade related to the foundation of the mosque by Manuchihr ibn Shavur, under the government of Seljuk Sultan Malik-Shah I:

[In the name of Allah, most gracious, most merciful, the construction of this mosque and mi]naret was ordered by the great emir Shuja al-daula Abu Shujā Mīnuchīhr b. Shavūr in the government of our lord, the exalted sultan, the great Shahanshah [the great king of all peoples, ruler of the Arabs and Persians, king of the Ea]st and West, Abu-l Fath Malikshah b. Alp-Arslan…

— Foundation inscription of the mosque.

A small trilingual inscription in the bottom left corner reads:

In Persian (no longer visible): In hejira 635 [1237/1238], the sinner, Zikéria, son of the late...

In Georgian [upper two lines]: In koronikon 458 [1238] I, the atabeg Zakaria, I have confirmed this

In Armenian [lowest line]: Those who observe this, may they be blessed by God

— Trilingual inscription

On top of it are a large Mongol Ilkhanid yarligh inscription of 1319, a taxation edict.

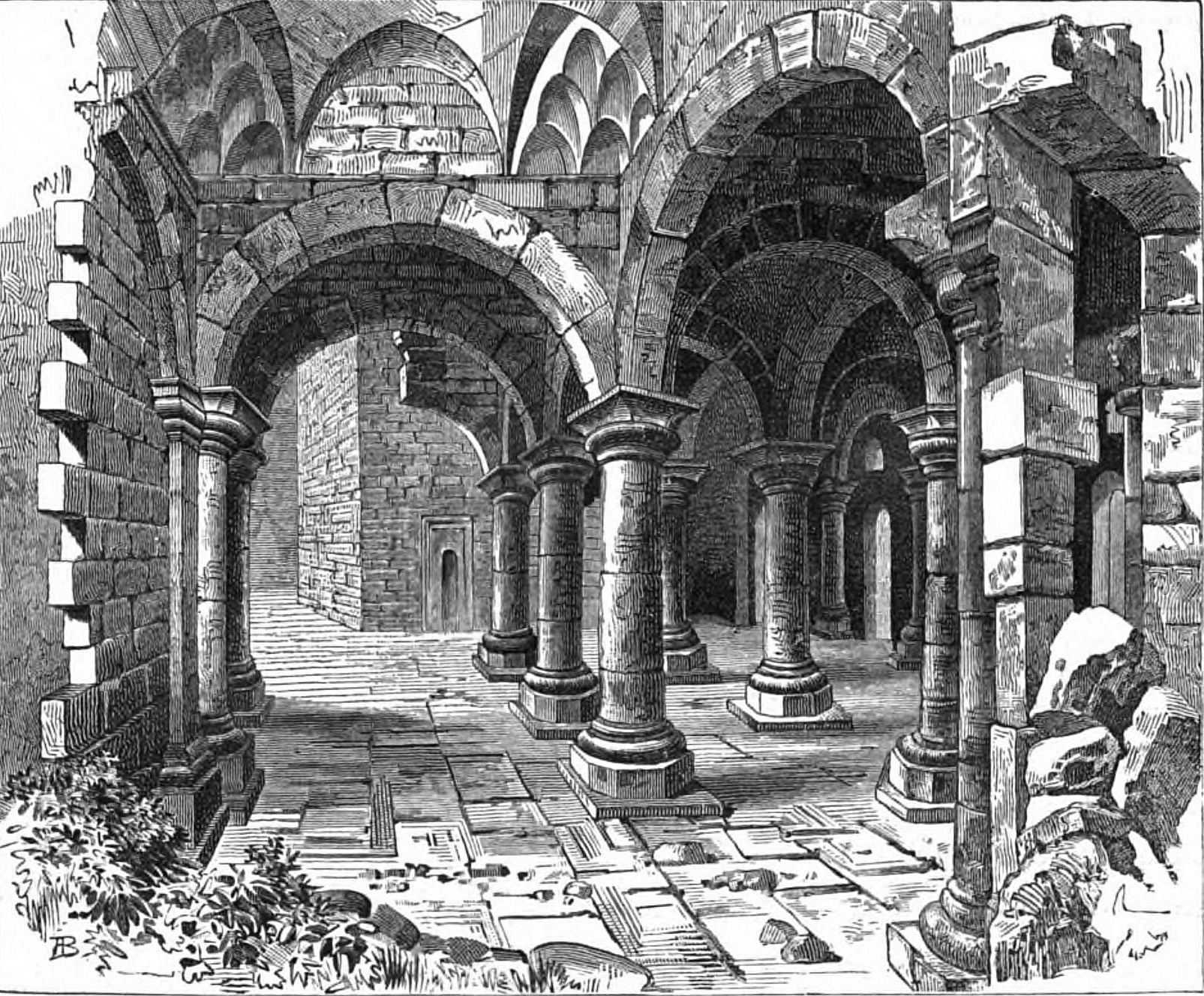
Menucihr Mosque, plan, 1881.

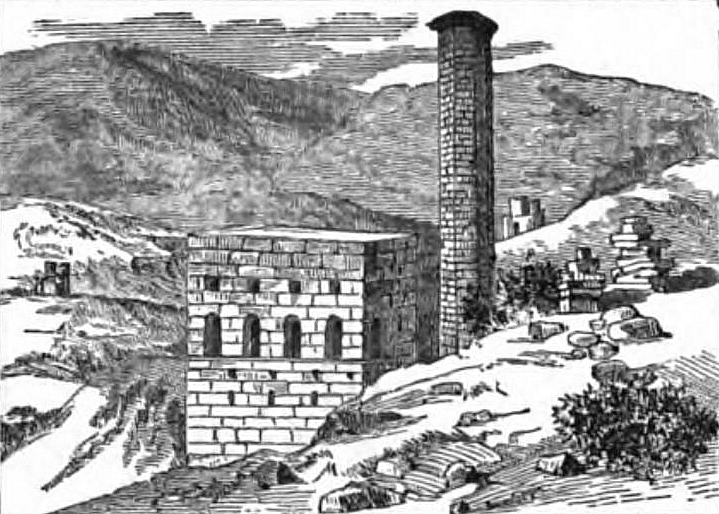
Menucihr Mosque, outside, 1881.

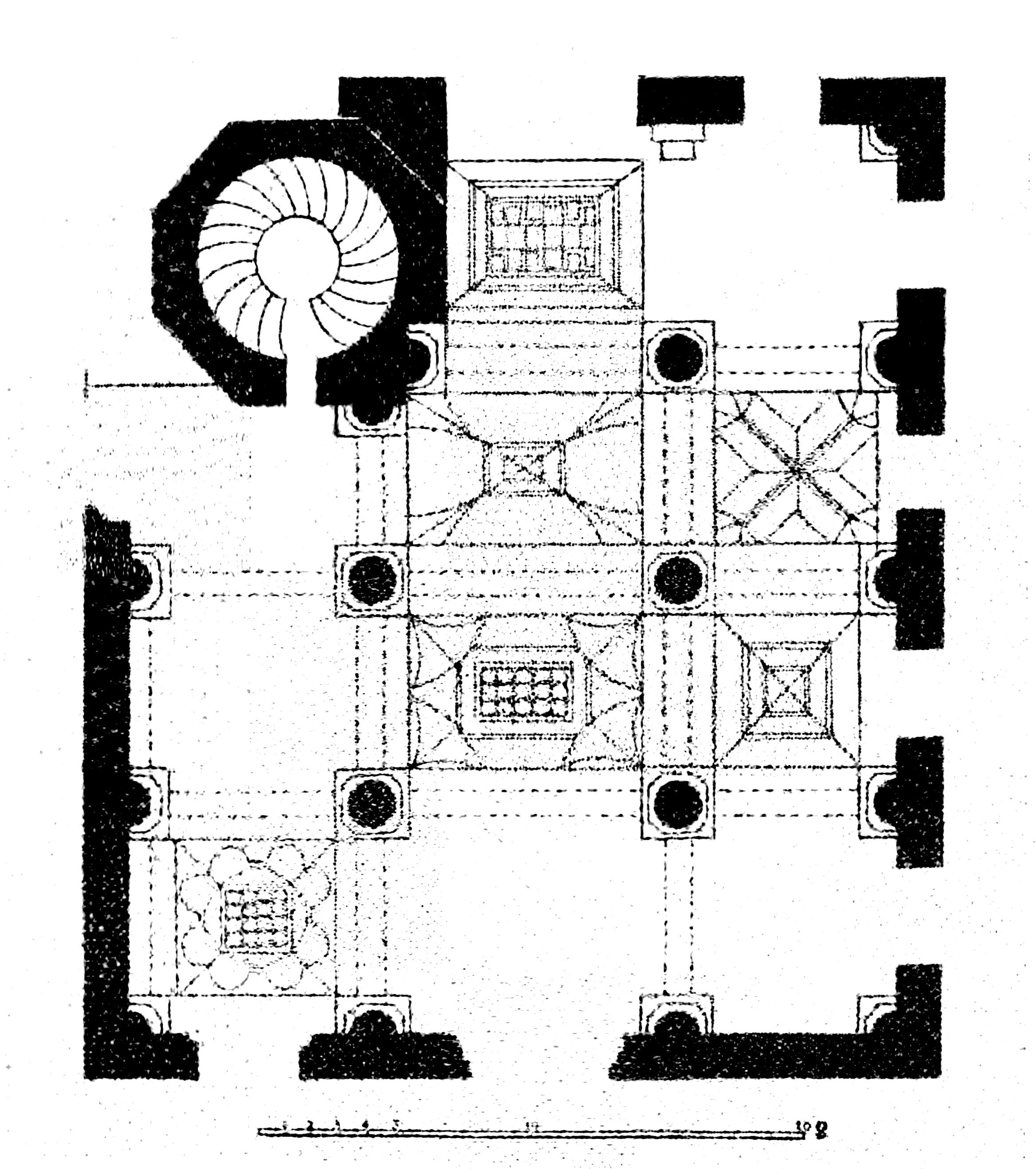
Menucihr Mosque, plan, 1881.

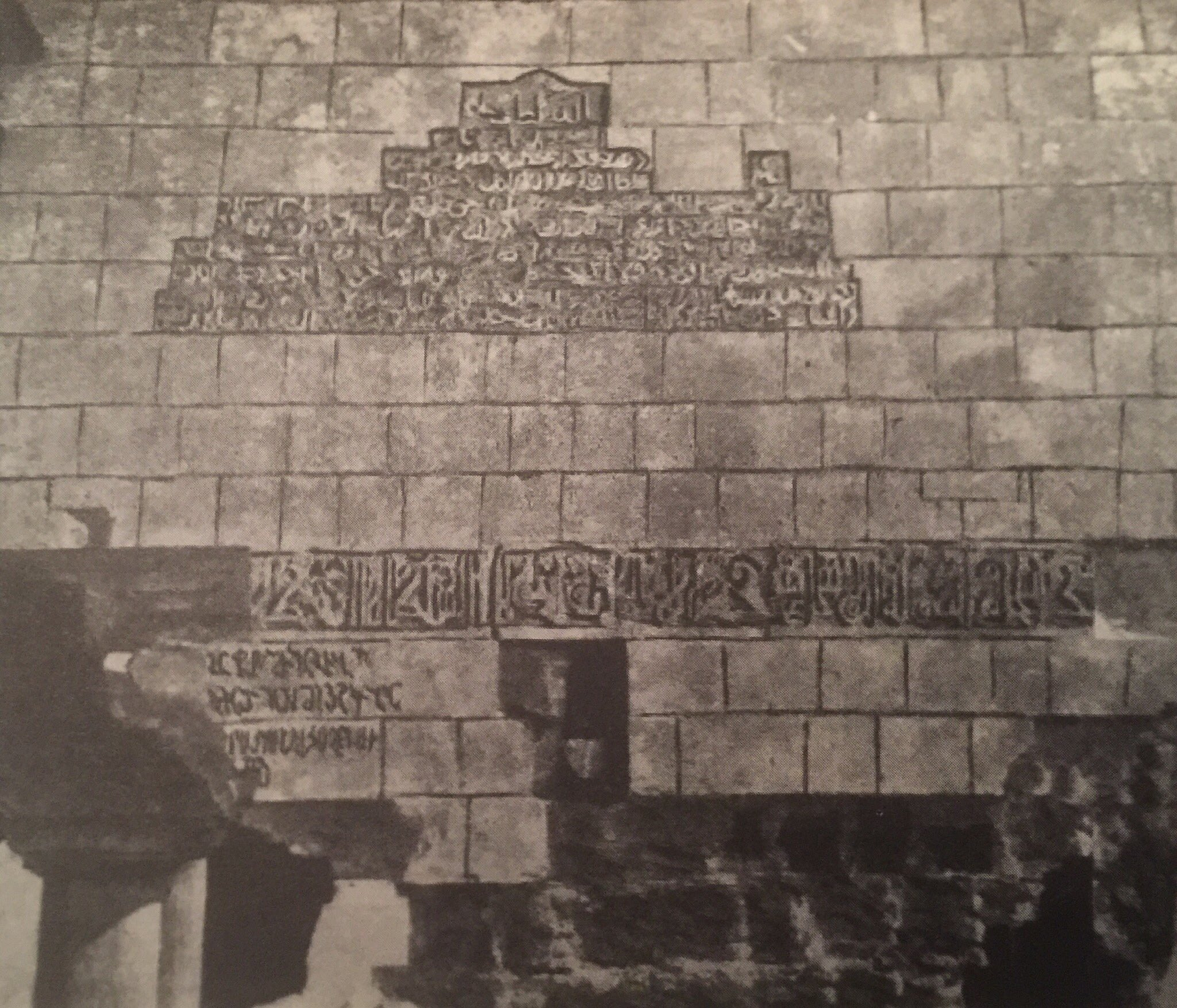
Trilingual inscription

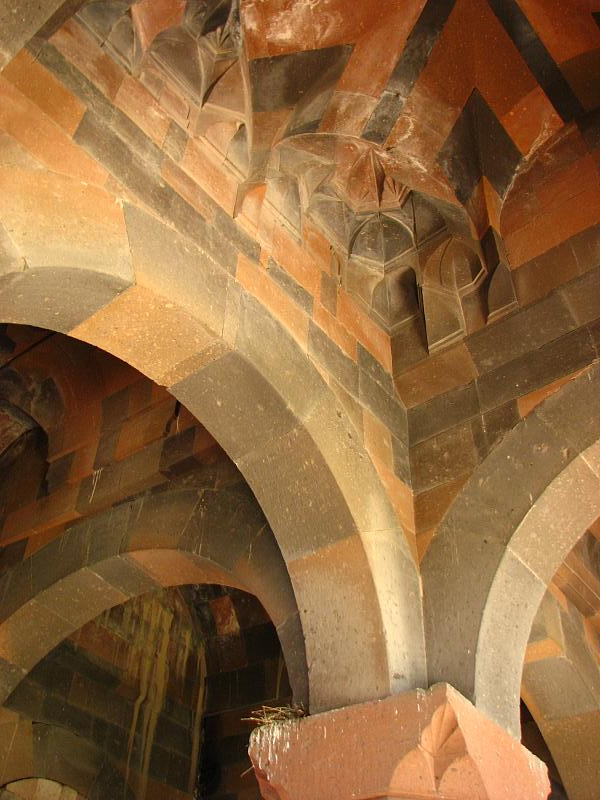
Column top with muqarnas design

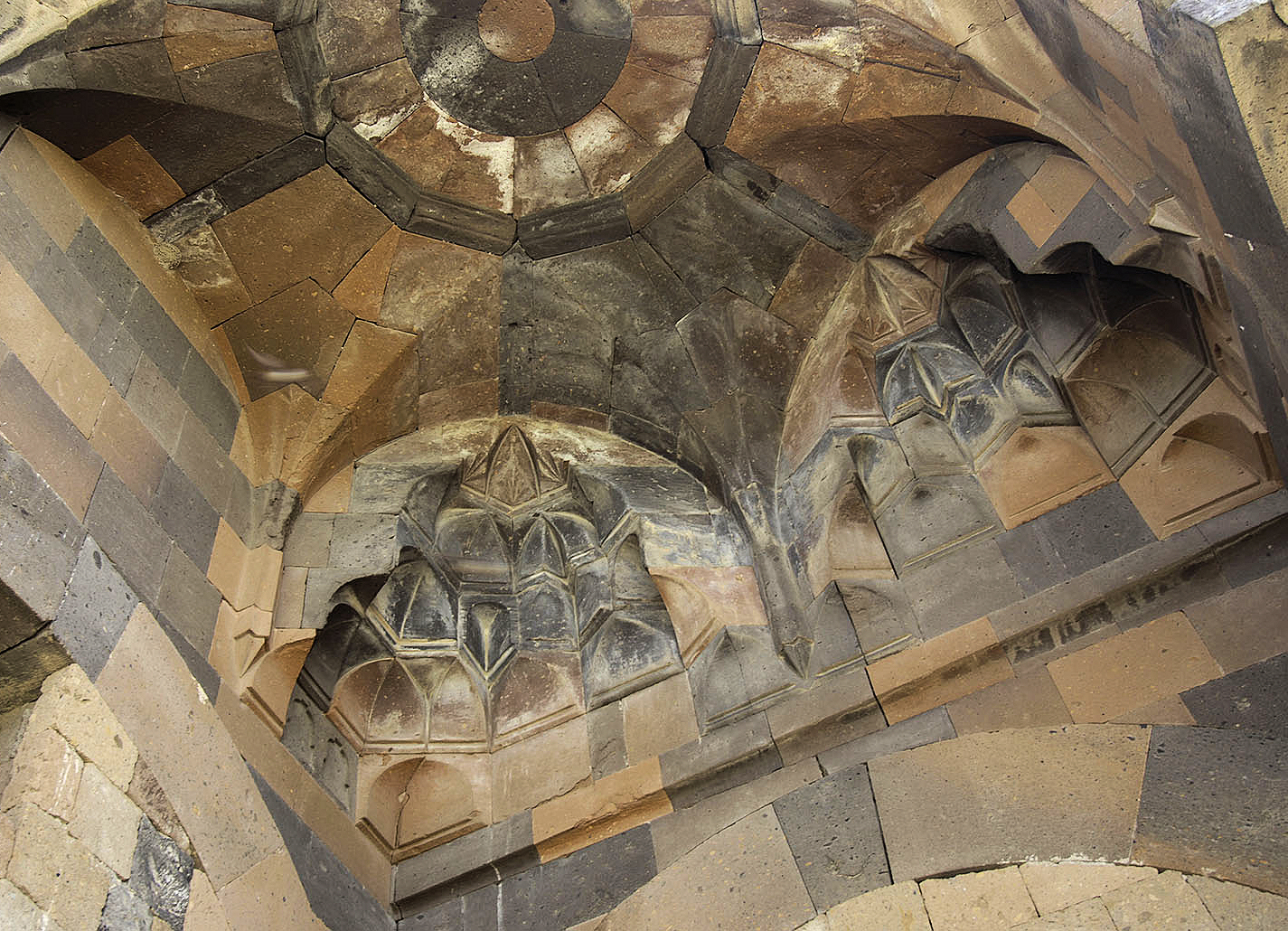
Ceiling with muqarnas design, 1072-1086

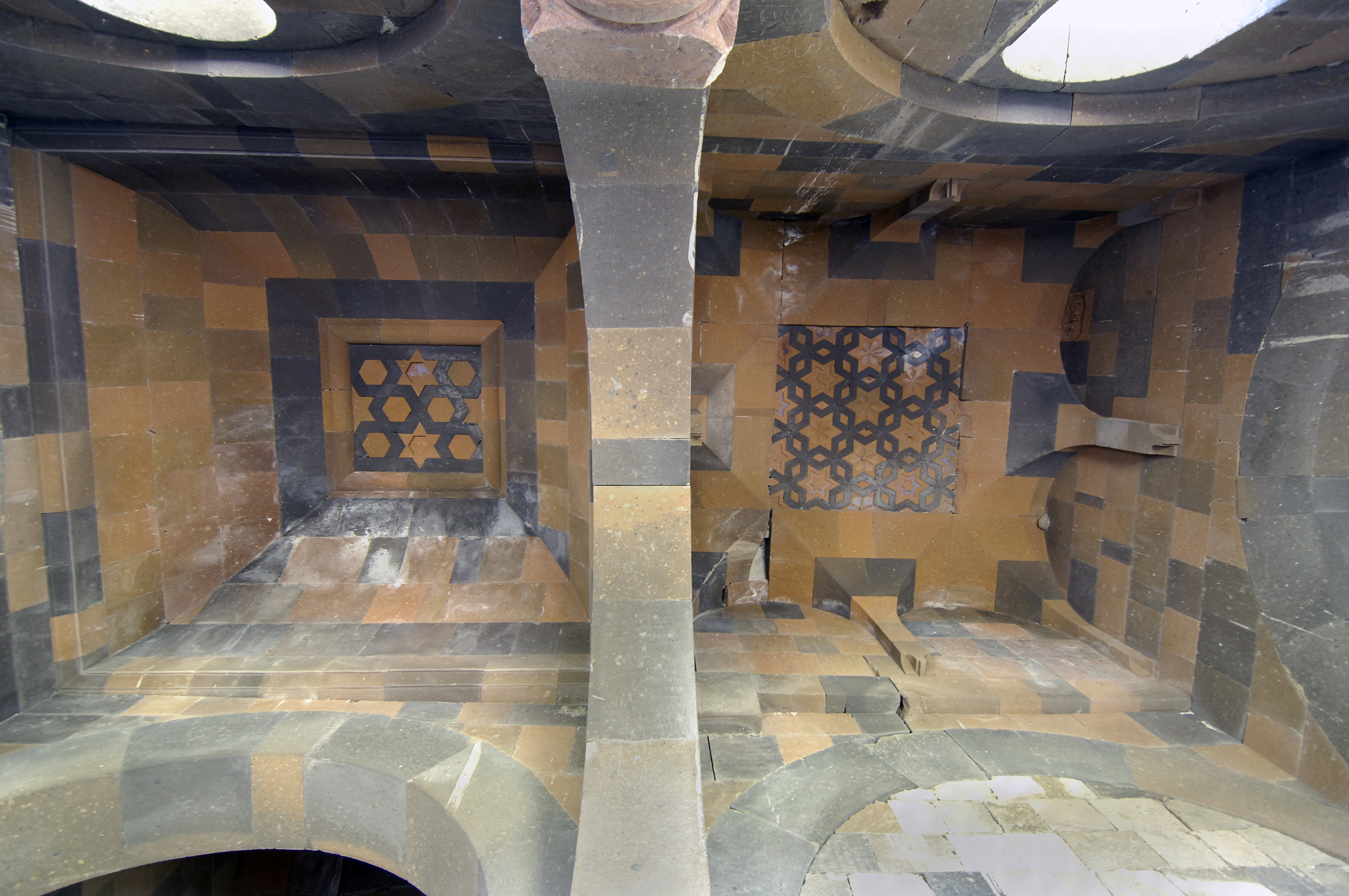
Ceiling decoration

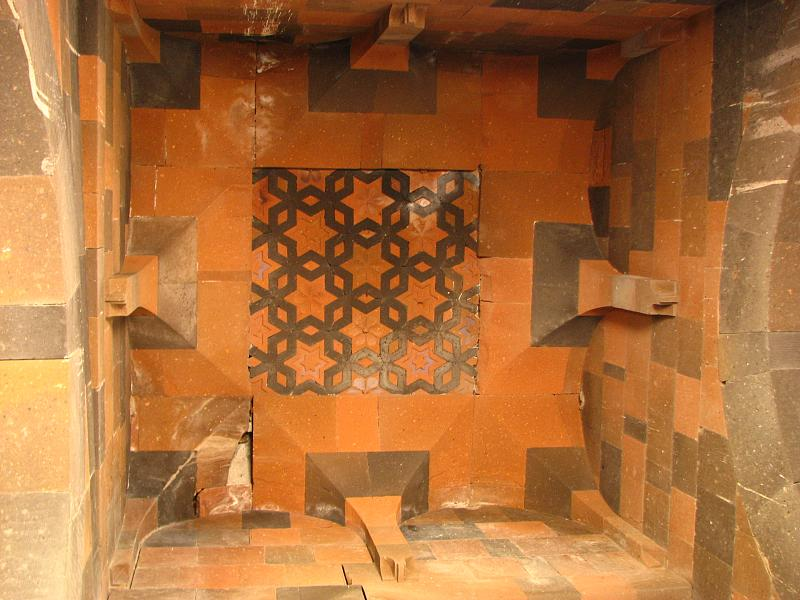
Ceiling decoration

== See also ==
- Spread of Islam among Kurds
- Seljuk architecture
