= Vache I Vachutian =

Armenian prince and Georgian court official (ruled 1206–1230)

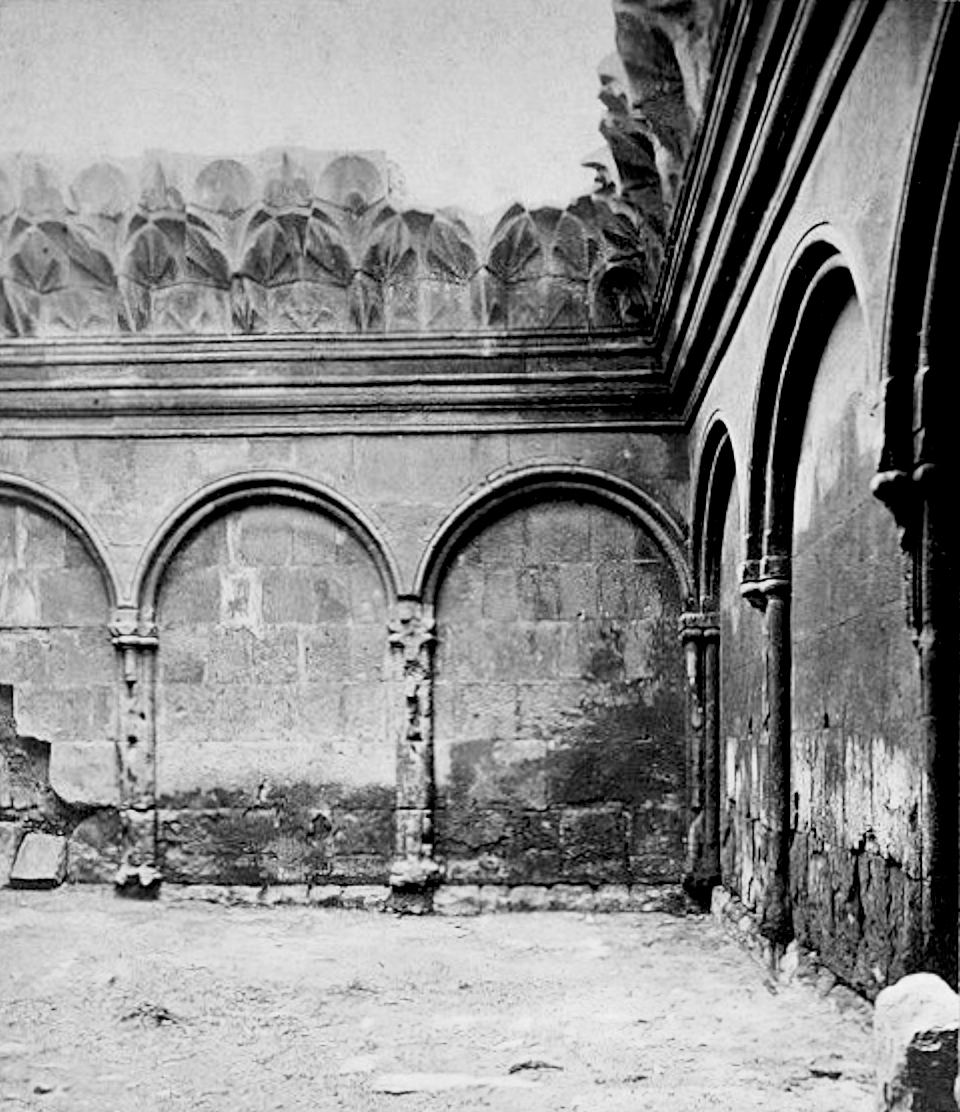
Mausoleum of Prince Vache Vacutian, built in 1229 in Horomos Monastery.

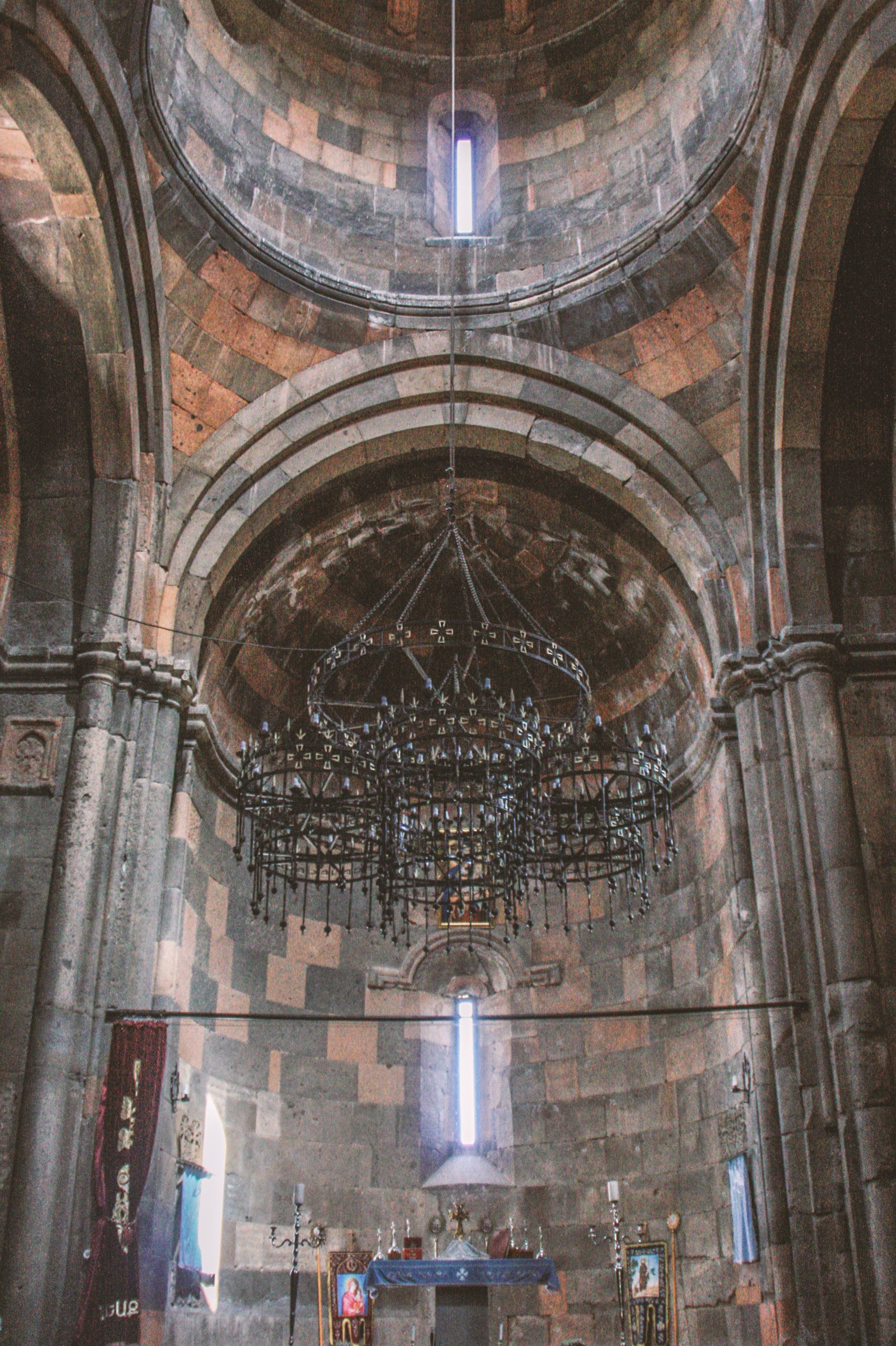
St. Garabed Kathoghike Church of Hovhannavank, built in 1216–1221 by Vache Vachutyan.

Vache I Vachutian also Vace Vacutian, also known as Amberdtsi Vachutyan (Վաչե Ա. Ամբերդեցի, ruled 1206–1230), was an Armenian prince, and a court official of the Kingdom of Georgia holding the offices of Msakhurtukhutsesi (Majordomo), founder of the Vachutian dynasty, themselves vassals to the Zakarid dynasty of Zakarid Armenia.

He was married to Mamakhatun, daughter of Abuserh.

Vache I Vachutian is known for the foundation of various monastic buildings in historical Armenia. He built the churches of the Saghmosavank Monastery (1215) and Hovhannavank Monastery (1216–1221), while his son Kurt built the zhamatuns attached to them, in 1250 for Hovhannavank and 1255 for Saghmosavank. Vache Vachutian also built the church of Tegher Monastery (1213), and the vestibule (gavit) of St. Astvatsatsin Church in Sanahin Monastery (1211), which is evidenced by the inscription preserved on the south wall inside the vestibule. He is also known for building a mausoleum at Horomos Monastery in 1229. The mausoleum is a square space of about 8x8 meters, lined with blind arcades supporting a huge "stone tent" structure of the type of the stalactite vaults. The "stone tent" would have reached a height of about 6 meters, giving a total of 9 meters for the mausoleum. Photographs from the 19th century show the wall and the beginning of the stone tent structure. This type of "stalactite tent" is also seen in other monuments, such as the gavit of the Church of the Holy Apostles at Ani. A dedicatory inscription appears on the tympanum:

By the grace of Christ, I, Vacë, son of Sargis, and my wife Mamaxatun, daughter of Abuserh, we built this hall of relics in this monastery of Horomos, under the prelature of Ter Barsel, son of Amir Erkat', and we gave in present at the library the vineyard that we had bought in Awsakan, for the office and for the relic. And we also gave to the church... in gold and two silver flabellum. In exchange, the monks of this chapter granted us the mass of the first Sunday after Easter in the churches of this place. And we gave further the vineyard of Pasakan hol, and the one who will ensure regularly our masses will have free disposal of wine. Therefore, those who execute this writing will be blessed by God, but if any of us or strangers... hinder our will, may it be accountable for our sins before God!
