= Horomos =

Ruins of an Armenian monastery in Turkey

Horomos Monastery
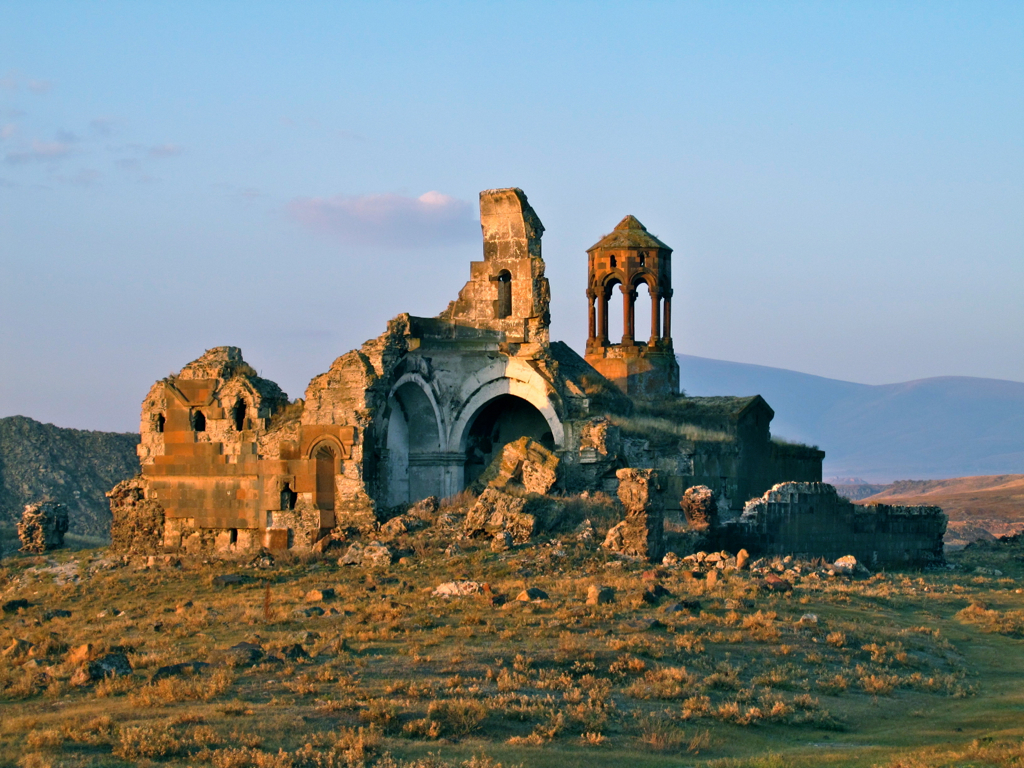
- View of the monastery from the northeast

- Location within Turkey Location within West and Central Asia

Religion
- Affiliation: Armenian Apostolic Church
- Status: ruined

Location
- Location: near Ani
- Coordinates: 40.519689°N 43.629158°E

Architecture
- Architect: Hovhannes
- Style: Armenian
- Completed: 10th-13th century

Horomos (Armenian: Հոռոմոս), also known as Horomosivank, Ghoshavank, Hochavank or Khosha Vank, is a medieval Armenian monastic complex about 15 kilometers northeast of the ruins of Ani—the capital of Bagratid Armenia—) in present-day eastern Turkey which got abandoned and ruined due to the Armenian Genocide in 1915. With its collection of churches, chapels and tombs, Horomos has been described as one of the most significant spiritual and cultural religious centers in medieval Armenia and one of the largest in all the Christian East.

== History ==
Horomos was founded by a group of Armenian monks around 931-36, during the reign of King Abas I Bagratuni (r. ca. 929-953). The monastic complex was enlarged over time and came to include the individual churches of Sts. John, Minas, and George, a series of large halls (gavits), a triumphal arch, and various smaller chapels and mausolea. It served as a burial ground for noble families, particularly Ashot III of Armenia (r. 953–77), Gagik I of Armenia (r. 989-1020), Yovhannēs-Smbat, and the Zakarids in the 13th century, and is a sort of Armenian "Saint-Denis".

=== Church of Saint John (1038) ===
The Church of Saint John ("Surb Yovhannēs"), now in a highly ruined state, was built by King Yovhannēs-Smbat, son of Gagik I of Armenia, in 1038, according to an inscription.

=== Zhamatun of Saint John church (1038) ===
The zhamatun of Saint John church is the first known instance of a zhamatun or gavit in Armenia, an architectural element built in front of the church for gathering purposes. It is dated to 1038, and was built by King Yovhannēs-Smbat, son of Gagik I of Armenia. It was already called žamatun in the dedicatory inscription:

In the year of the Armenians 487 [i.e. 1038], I, the šahanšah Yovannēs, son of the šahanšah Gagik, gave my vineyard located in Kołb to this church of mine, Surb-Yovannēs (Saint John), which I have built in this monastery of Hoṙomos, along with this žamatun...

— dedicatory inscription of the gavit

The tomb of King Yovhannēs-Smbat is located here.

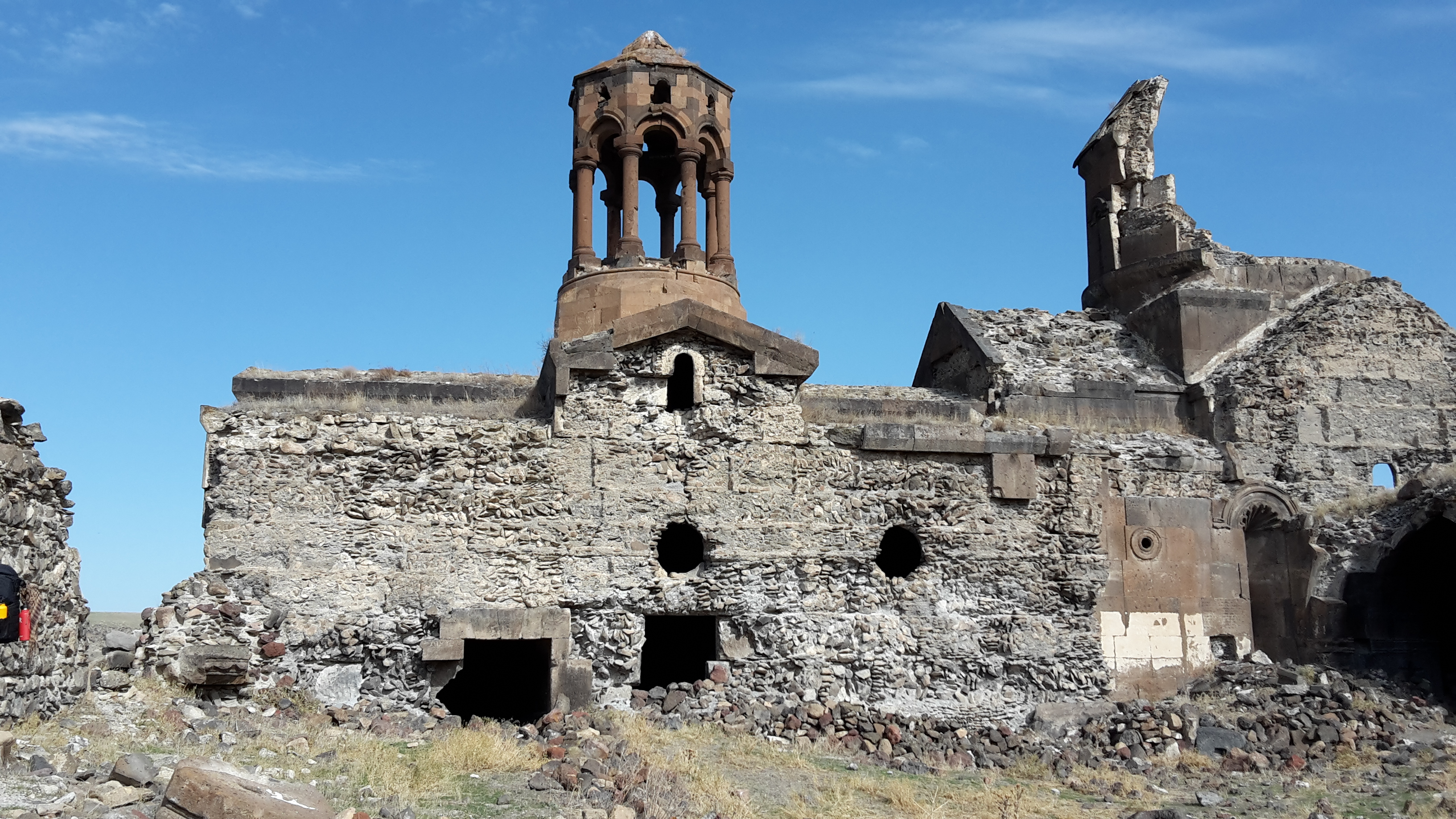
The zhamatun with its colonnaded belvedere covering the hole of the oculus.

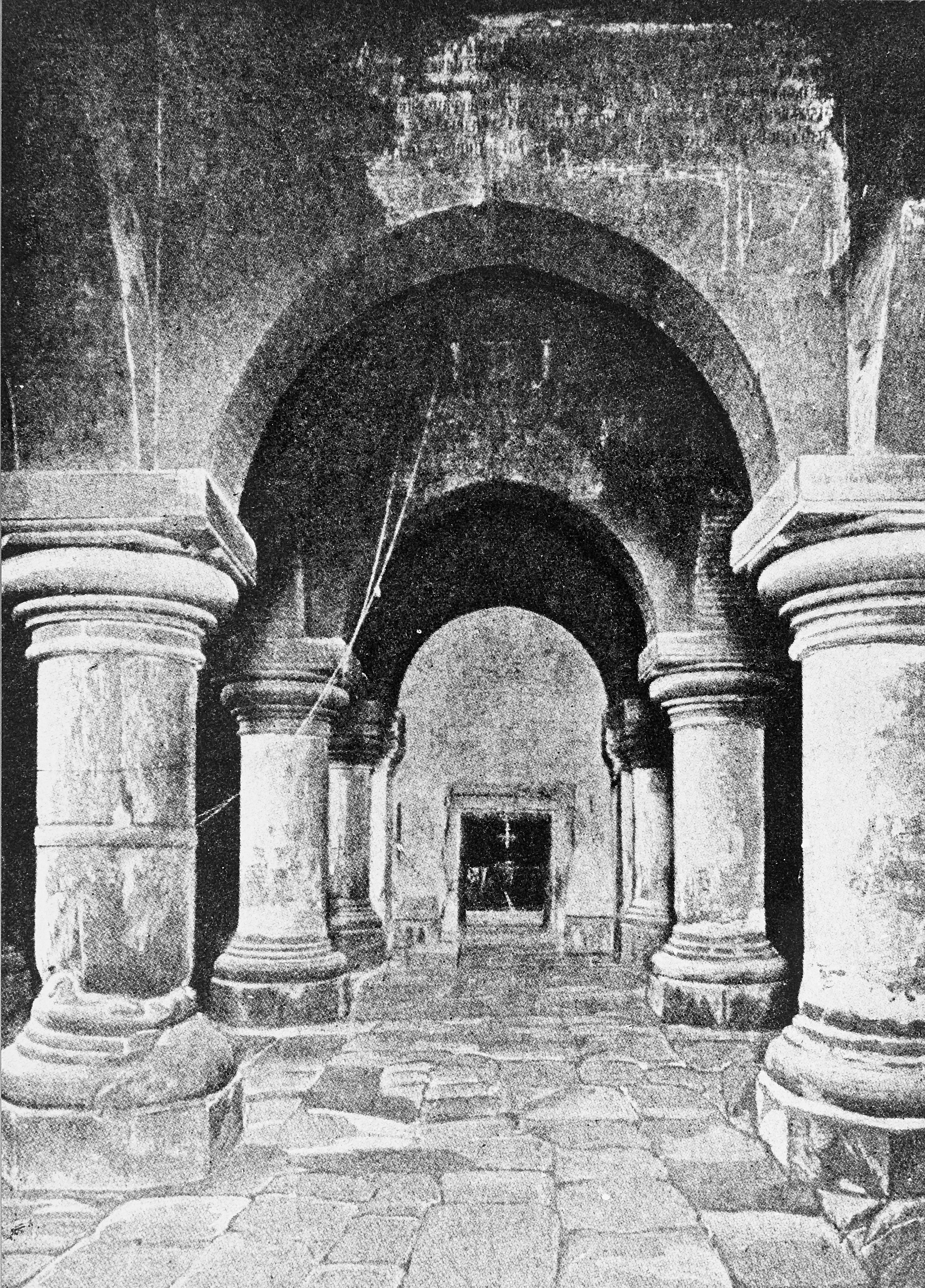
Inside the zhamatun

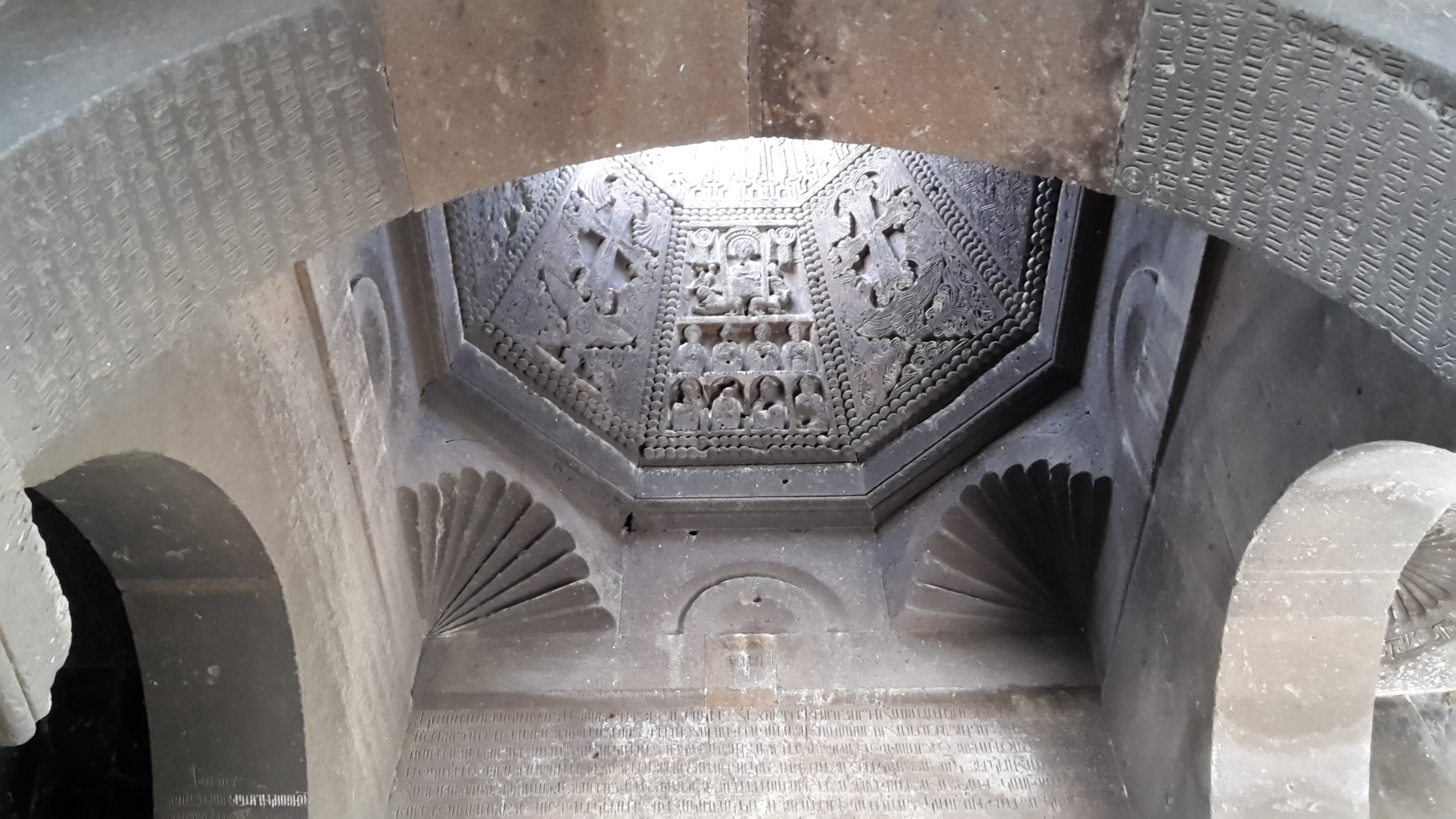
Pillars of the zhamatun, and octagonal vault, featuring "The Tetramorphic Throne and the Last Judgement".

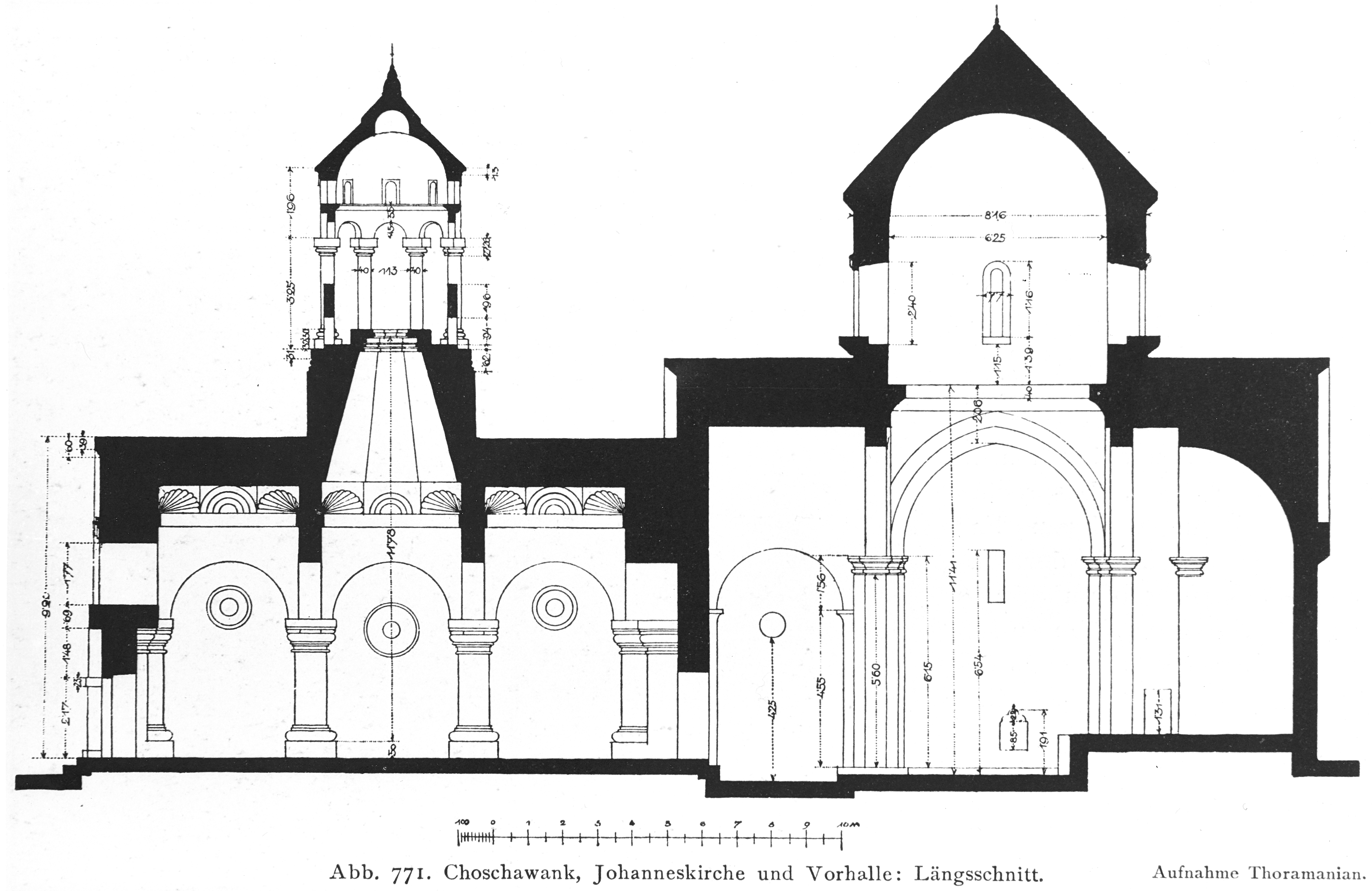
Cross section of the church and its gavit or zhamatun

=== Ruzukan chapel (1215) ===
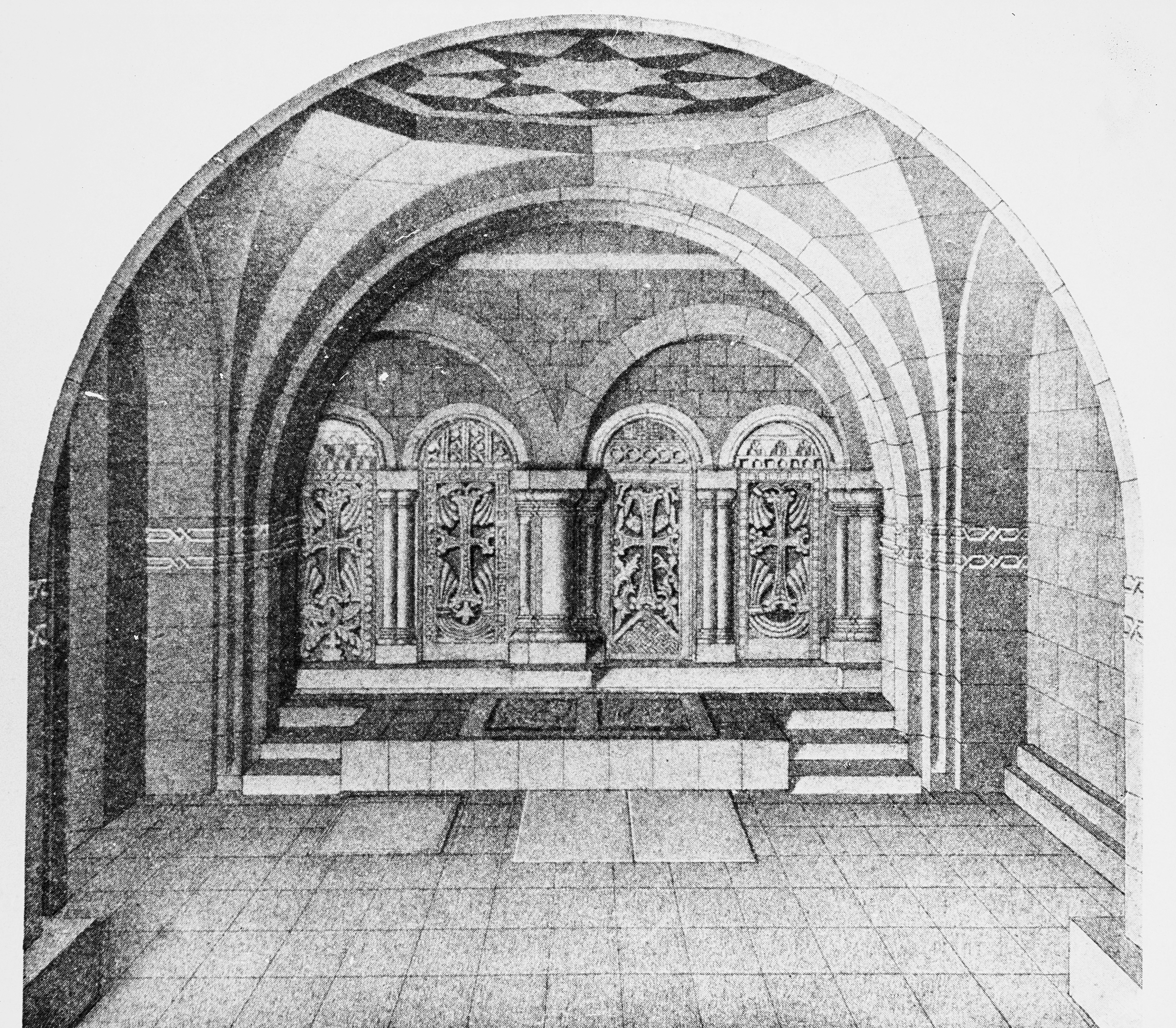
Ruzukan Chapel reconstruction

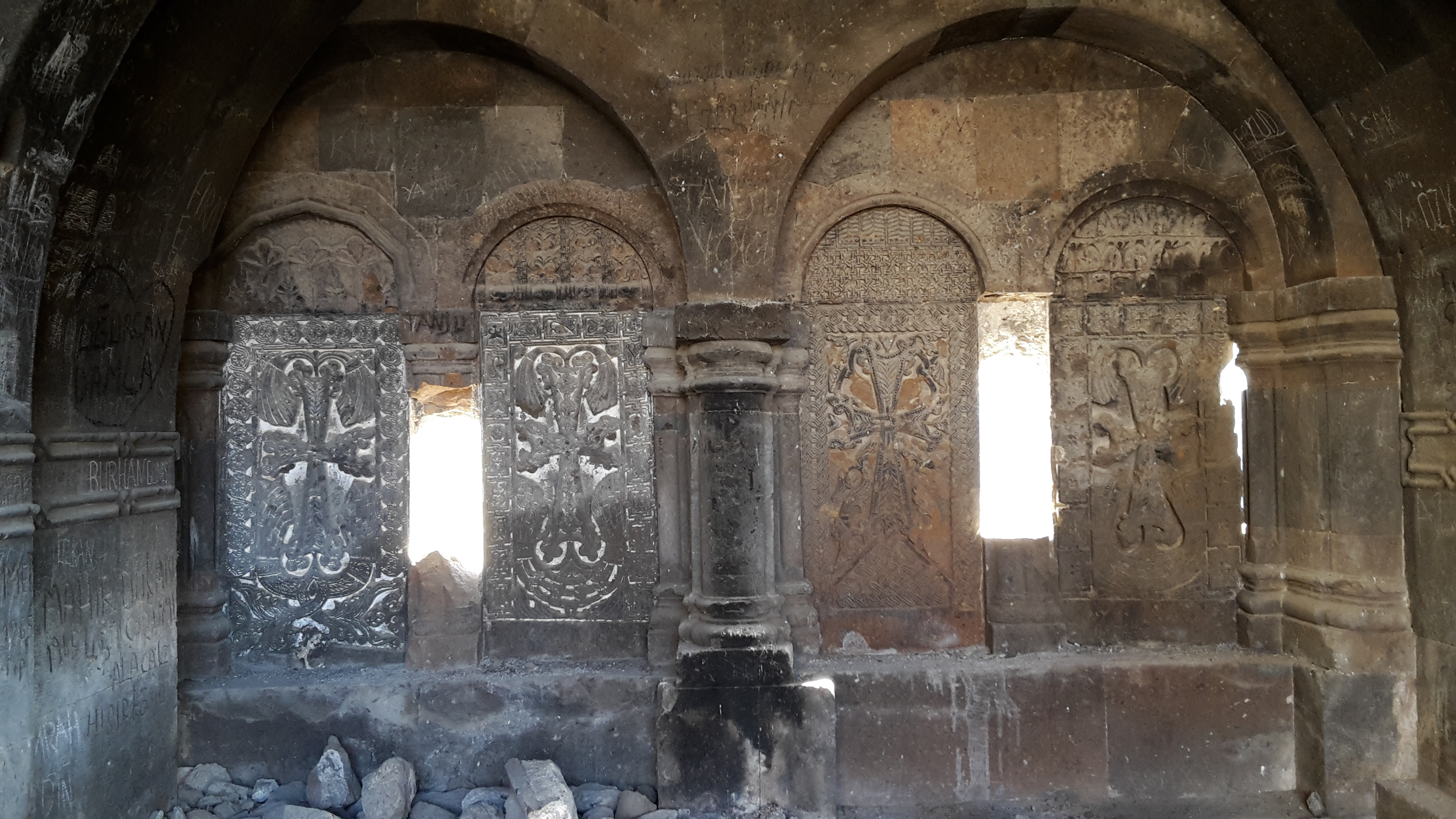
East wall decorated with the four khatchkar crosses

The Ruzukan chapel is a two-storey burial structure with a large chamber and three small chapels on top, built against the southern wall of the Saint John church. According to an inscription, the chapel was commissioned in 1215 by Kutlu Khatun, for her mother Ruzukan, under the supervision of Bishop Sargis.

The main chamber opens to the west, through an arch. The main chamber is decorated by a three-arris vault supported by four columns, and an eastern wall adorned with four khatchkar crosses. The vault has an octagon design at its center, assorted with sophisticatd geometric patterns. The side walls are encircled by a linear decorative relief known as a "Seljuk chain", although it was already used in Armenia before the arrival of the Seljuks. Many similar decorative elements can be found in the Divriği Great Mosque and Hospital, built in 1228.

To the south of the Ruzukan Chapel is the Chapel of Khatun of Ani, now completely ruined.

=== Mausoleum of Prince Vache Vachutian (1229) ===
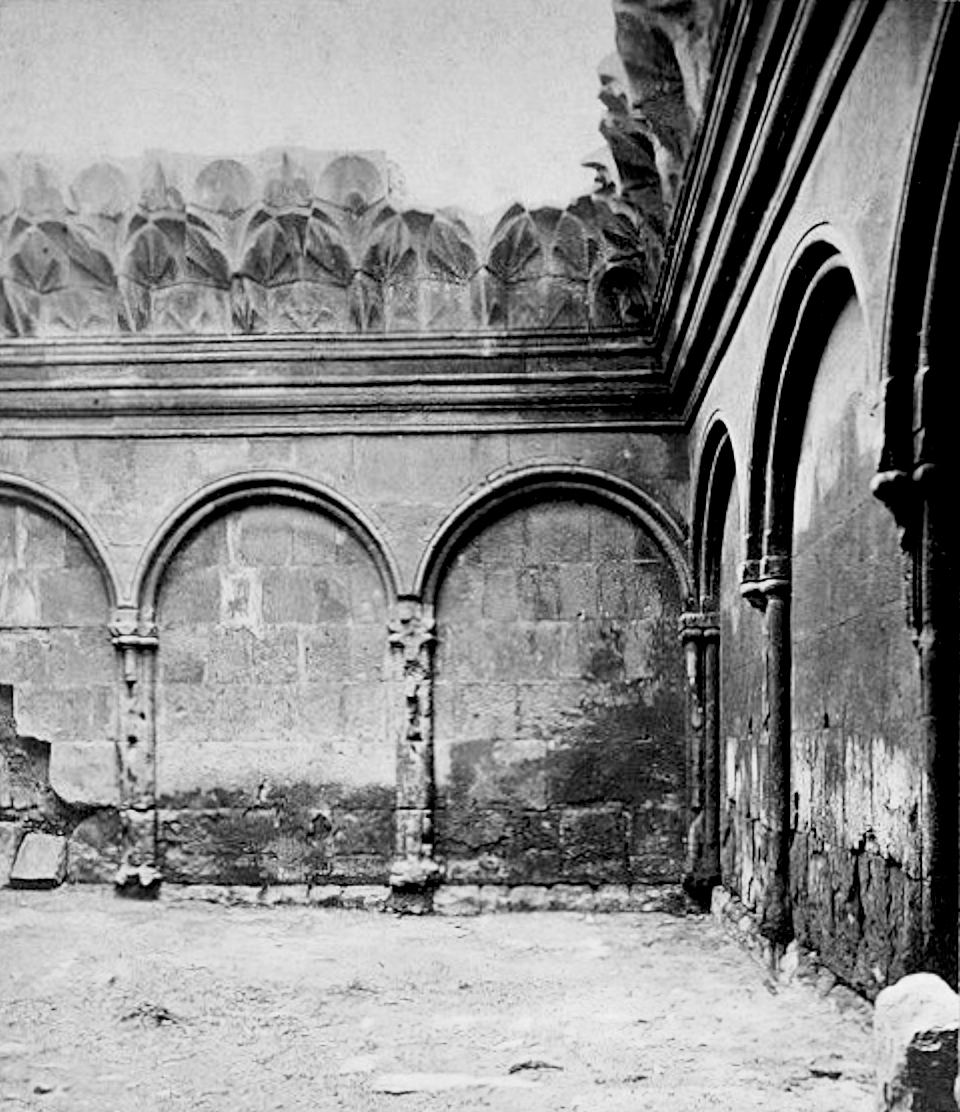
Mausoleum of Prince Vache Vacutian (Governor of Ani 1213-1232), built in 1229

South of Saint John church and its zhamatun, a block of three particular buildings remains. One of them is the mausoleum of Prince Vache Vachutian, Governor of Ani in 1213-1232 and founder of the Vachutian dynasty of vassals of the Zakarids, built in 1229. The mausoleum is a square space of about 8x8 meters, lined with blind arcades supporting a huge "stone tent" structure of the type of the stalactite vaults. The "stone tent" would have reached a height of about 6 meters, giving a total of 9 meters for the mausoleum. Photographs from the 19th century show the wall and the beginning of the stone tent structure. This type of "stalactite tent" is also seen in other monuments, such as the gavit of the Church of the Holy Apostles at Ani. A dedicatory inscription appears on the tympanum:

By the grace of Christ, I, Vacë, son of Sargis, and my wife Mamaxatun, daughter of Abuserh, we built this hall of relics in this monastery of Horomos, under the prelature of Ter Barsel, son of Amir Erkat', and we gave in present at the library the vineyard that we had bought in Awsakan, for the office and for the relic. And we also gave to the church... in gold and two silver flabellum. In exchange, the monks of this chapter granted us the mass of the first Sunday after Easter in the churches of this place. And we gave further the vineyard of Pasakan hol, and the one who will ensure regularly our masses will have free disposal of wine. Therefore, those who execute this writing will be blessed by God, but if any of us or strangers... hinder our will, may it be accountable for our sins before God!

=== Mausoleum of Aruits (1277) ===
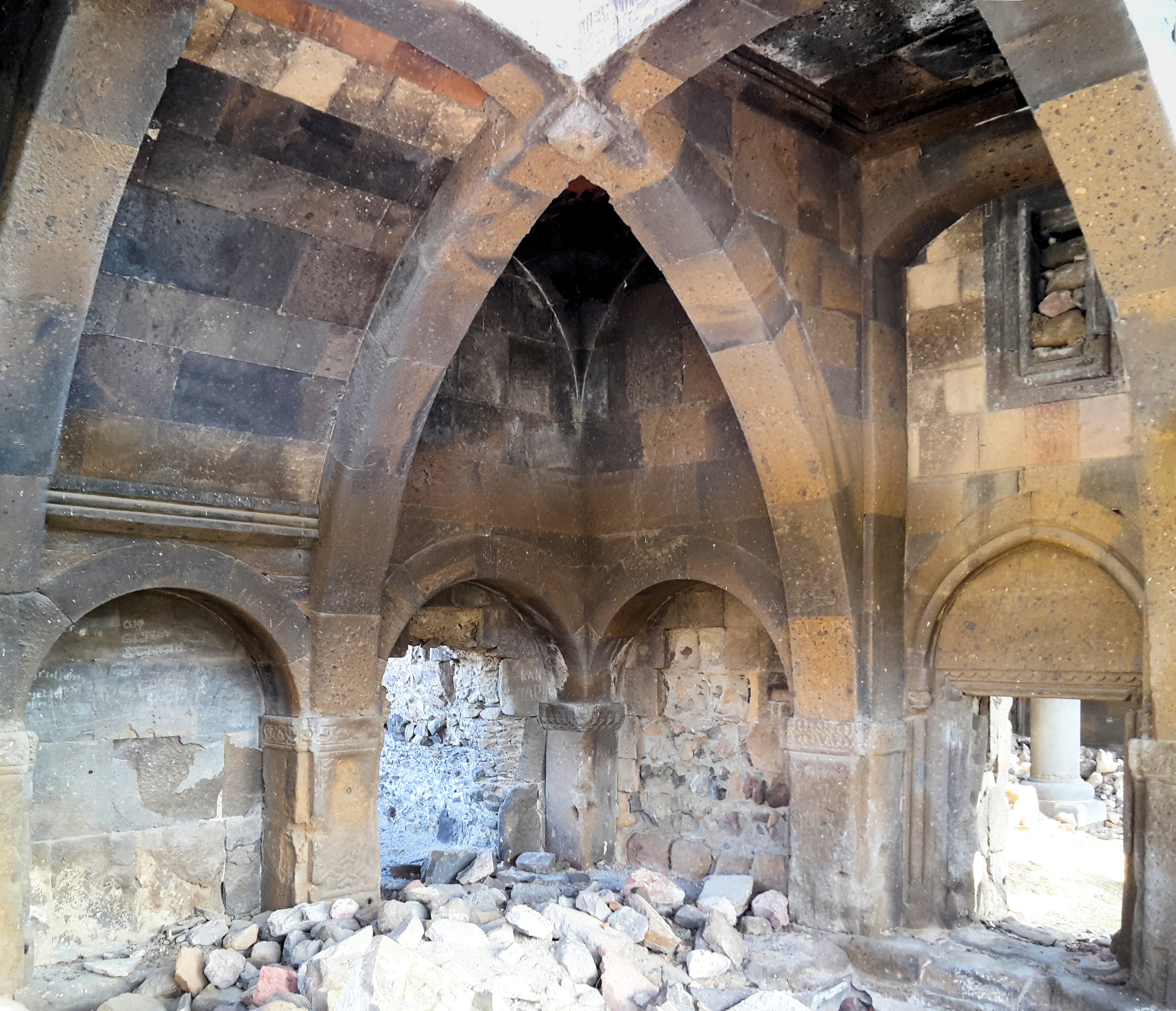
"Mausoleum of Aruits"

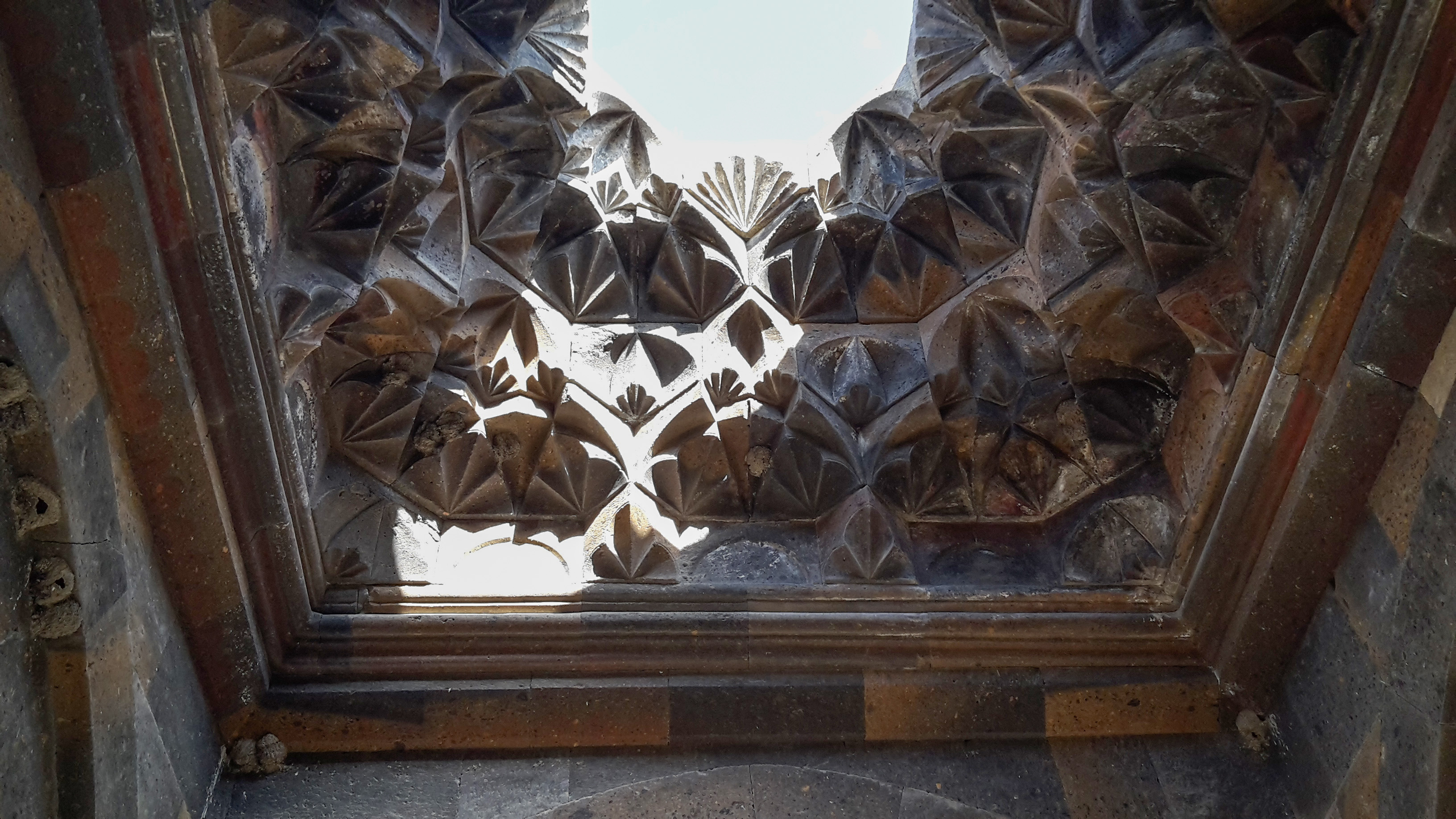
Muqarnas vault at the apex

A mausoleum called the "Mausoleum of Aruits", after its donator the merchant Ariuts (Aṙwic) Hogeworeanc', is located south of the church and its gavit, among a group of three buildings. The roof is supported by a pair of parallel arches, converging to a vault with muqarnas decoration and an open oculus. It is broadly similar in style to the gavit of the Church of the Holy Apostles at Ani, but is dated to 1277 according to a dedicatory inscription. The inscription around the window was written by a rich merchant named Aṙwic Hogeworeanc', who is also known from an inscription is the main zhamatun, where he explains he repaired the water pipeline built in 1198, after they were left in a state of disrepair by the Mongols. His inscription in this mausoleum reads:

In the year 726 [i.e. 1277], by the will of God, I, Aṙwic Hogew[oreanc'], son of Sargis, and my wife Seda, we built from our fair income this reliquary room, at the door of our zhamatun, for the memory of our parents and... [I have compl]eted this by the power of God, master Frer, (originally) from Karnoy K'alak'.

— inscription of the Mausoleum of Aruits (1277).

=== Manuscripts ===
The monastery was an active center of manuscript creation. The famous Haghpat Gospel was created in Horomos in 1211, and then put under the custody of the Haghpat Monastery. In one of the pages, entitled "Entry into Jerusalem", Jesus, riding a donkey, is actually shown entering the gates of Horomos Monastery itself.

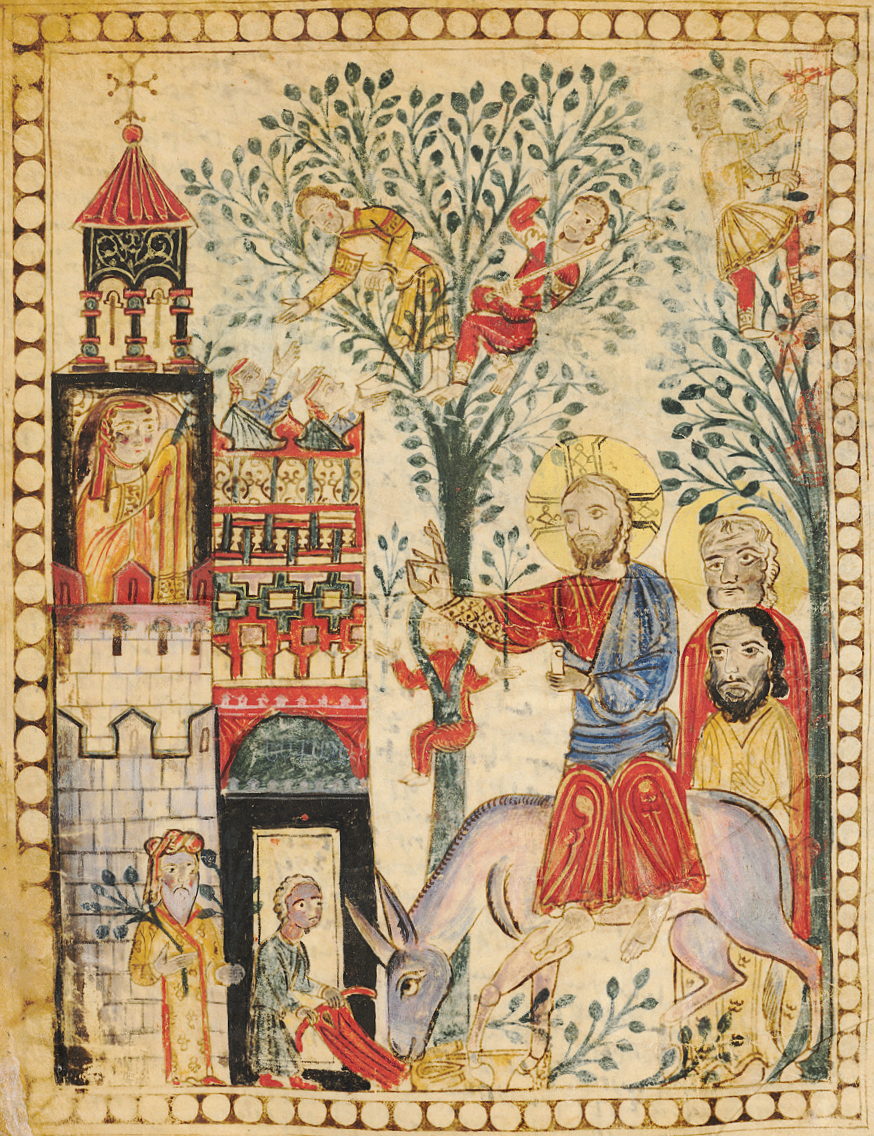
"Entry into Jerusalem", Haghpat Gospel created in Horomos in 1211. Jesus is actually shown entering the gates of Horomos Monastery.

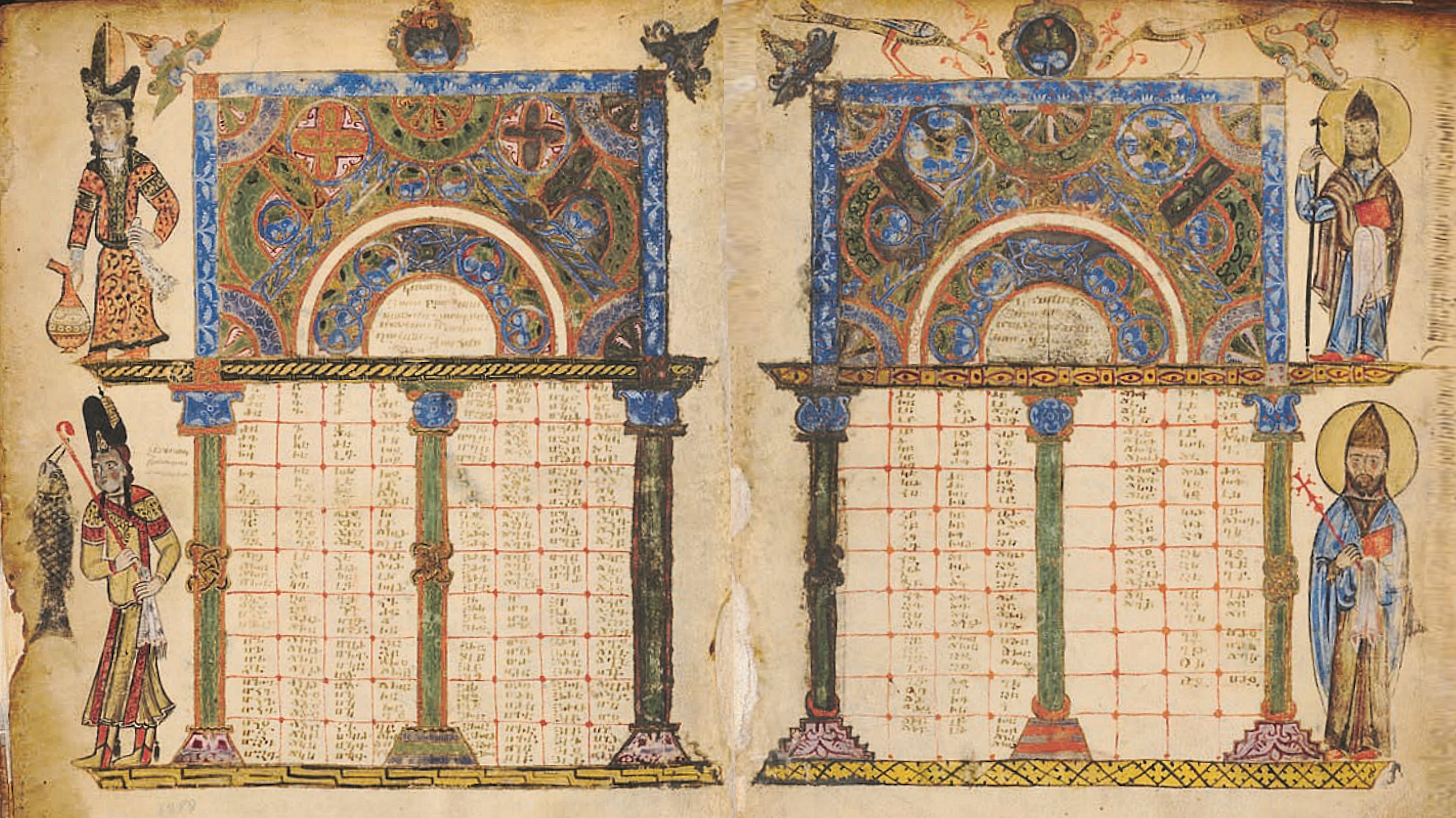
Canon tables from the Haghbat Gospels, created in Horomos and soon after given to the Haghpat Monastery; 1211 (Matendaran, MS 6288, fols. 8v–9r). Individuals in traditional Armenian dress appear to the left.

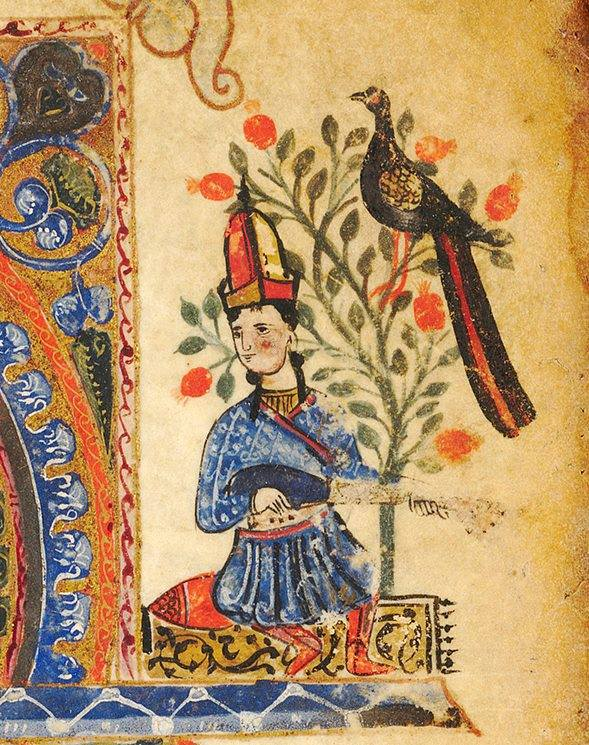
Female Troubadour with saz instrument.

The monastery continued to function after the fall of Ani, but appears to have been temporary abandoned in the early 17th century and then reoccupied and repaired in 1685. It continued to operate as a monastery until it was finally abandoned due to the Armenian Genocide.

Some time after 1965, the monastery was partly destroyed, most likely as part of the Turkish government's policy of cultural genocide. A tomb believed to belong to King Ashot III (953-977) which had survived at least up to 1920 is now nowhere to be found. Some buildings have entirely vanished, and most of the surviving walls have been stripped of their facing masonry. The dome of the Church of the St. John collapsed in the 1970s. As of 2003, the site lies next to the Armenian border and gaining permission to visit the monastery is all but impossible.

== Gallery ==
=== Historic photos ===
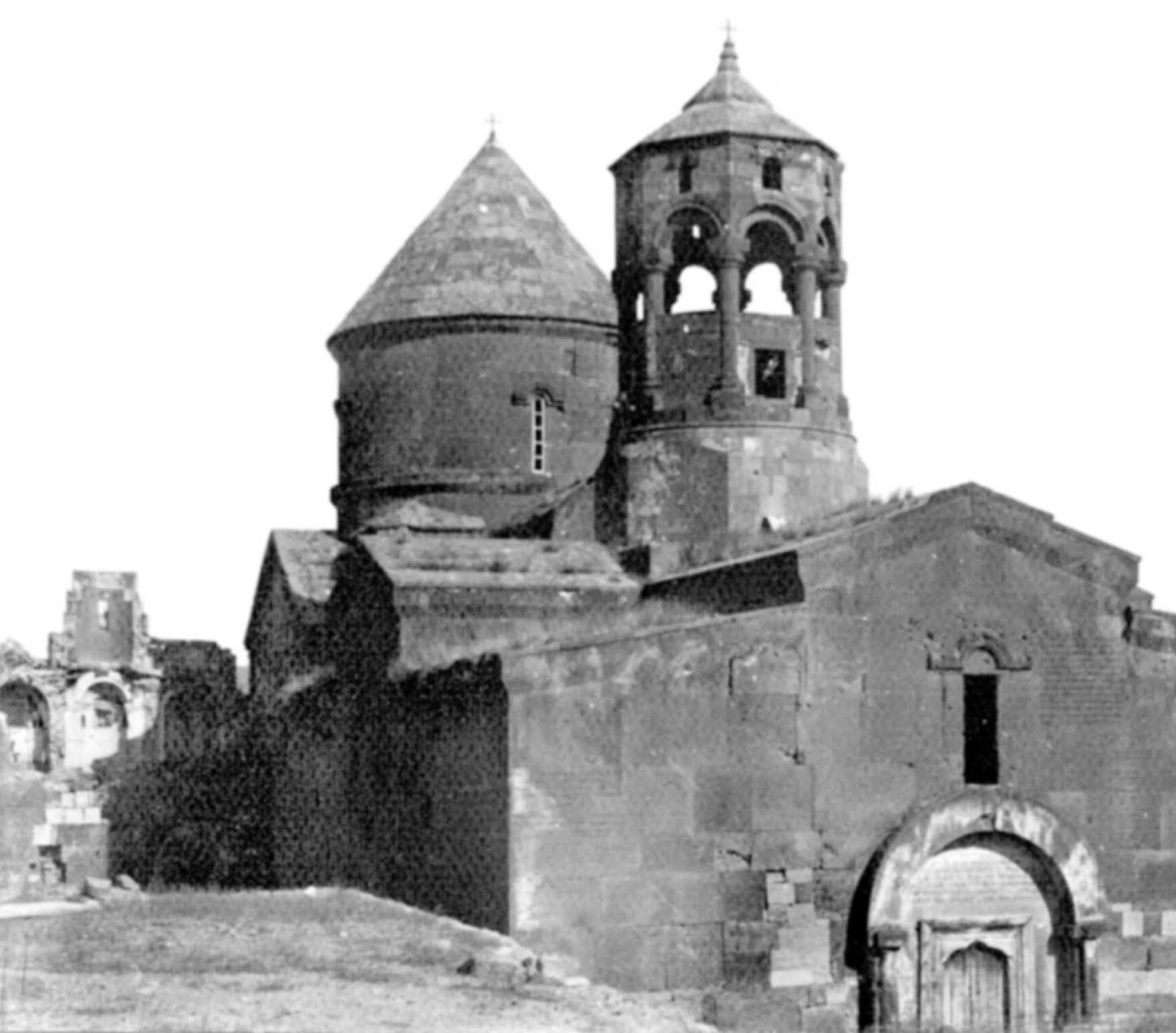
Horomos Monastery: St. John's zhamatun and church. Photo T‘oros T‘oramanean, 1910s.

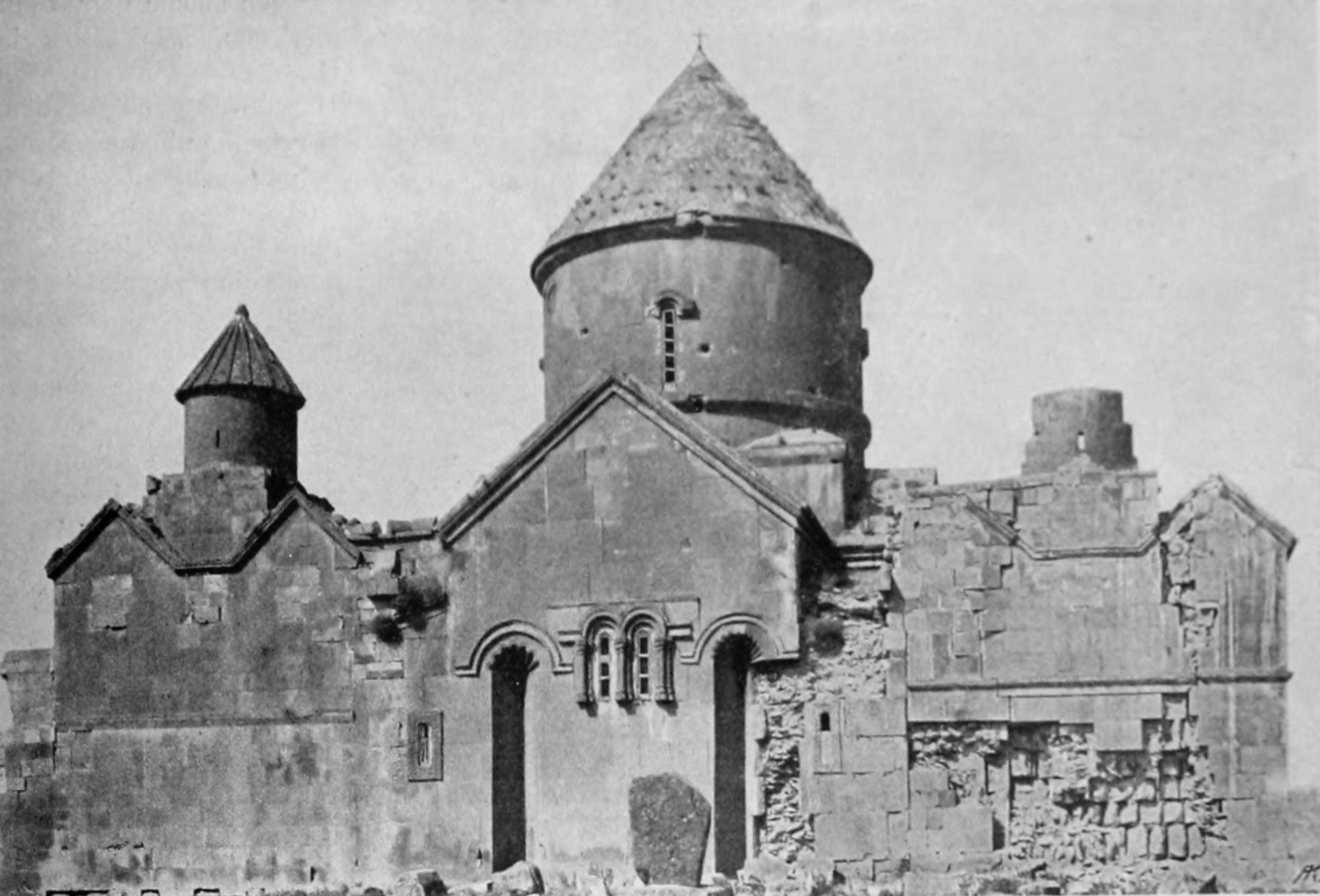
East side of the church of St. John at Horomos; early 20th century photograph

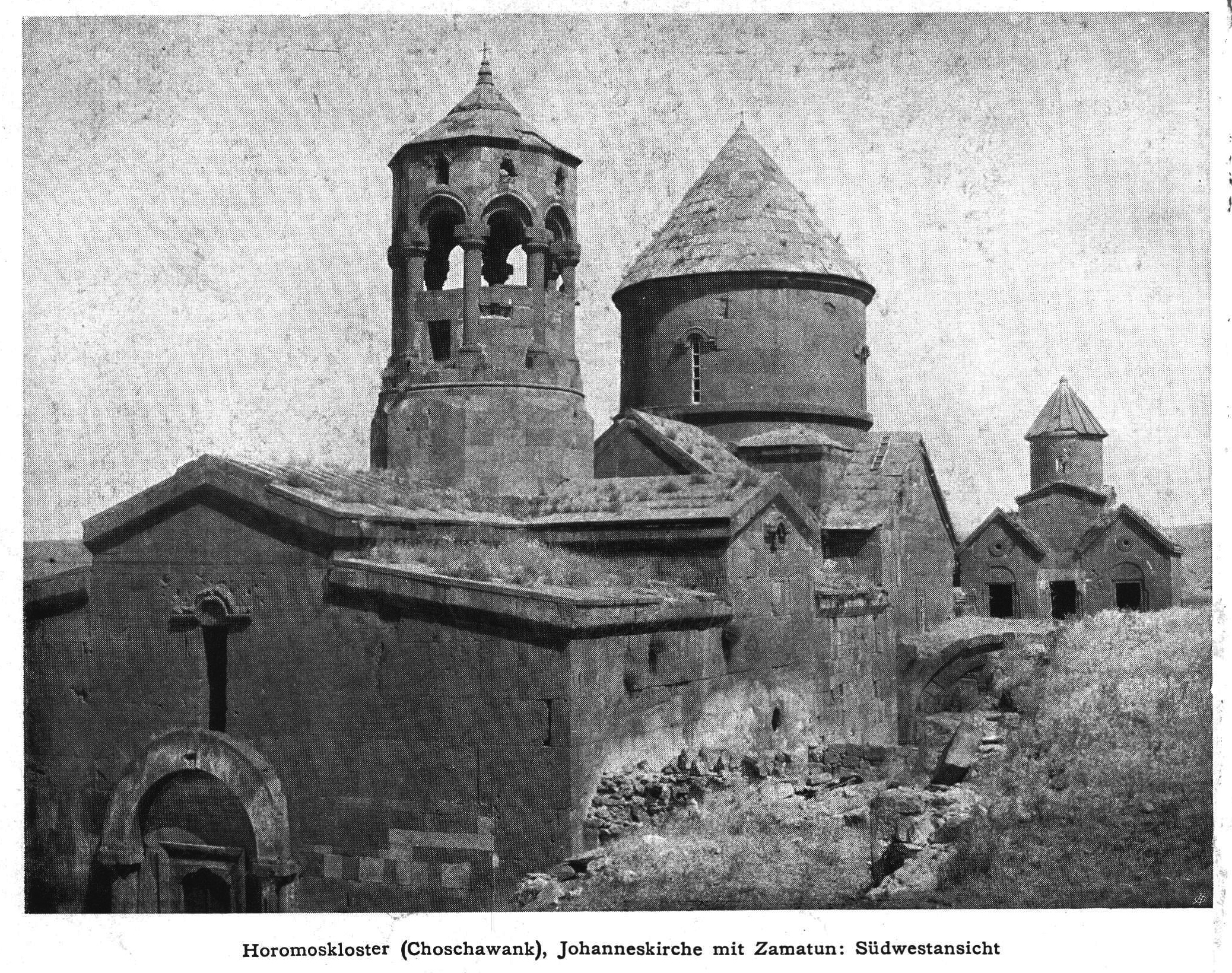

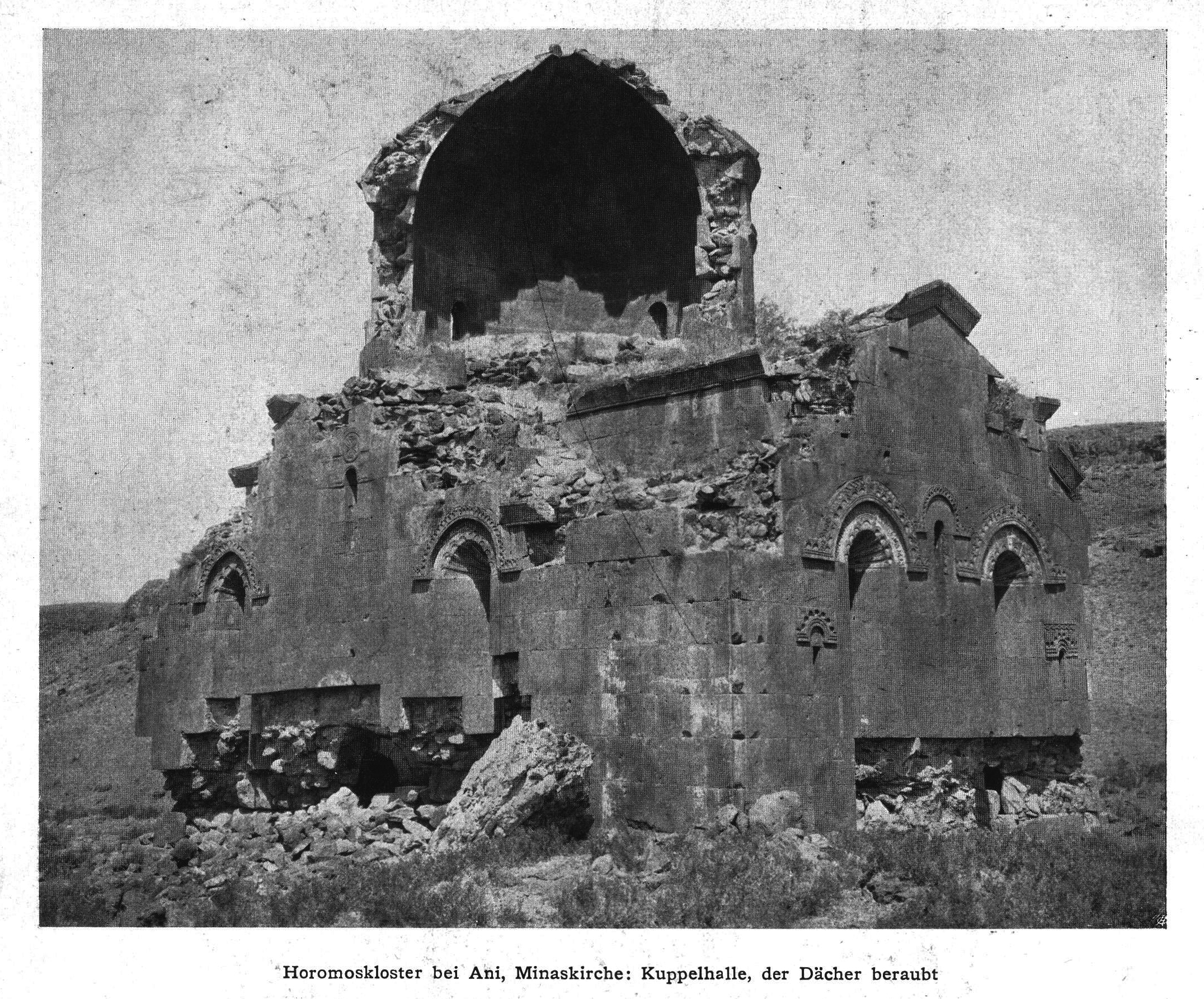

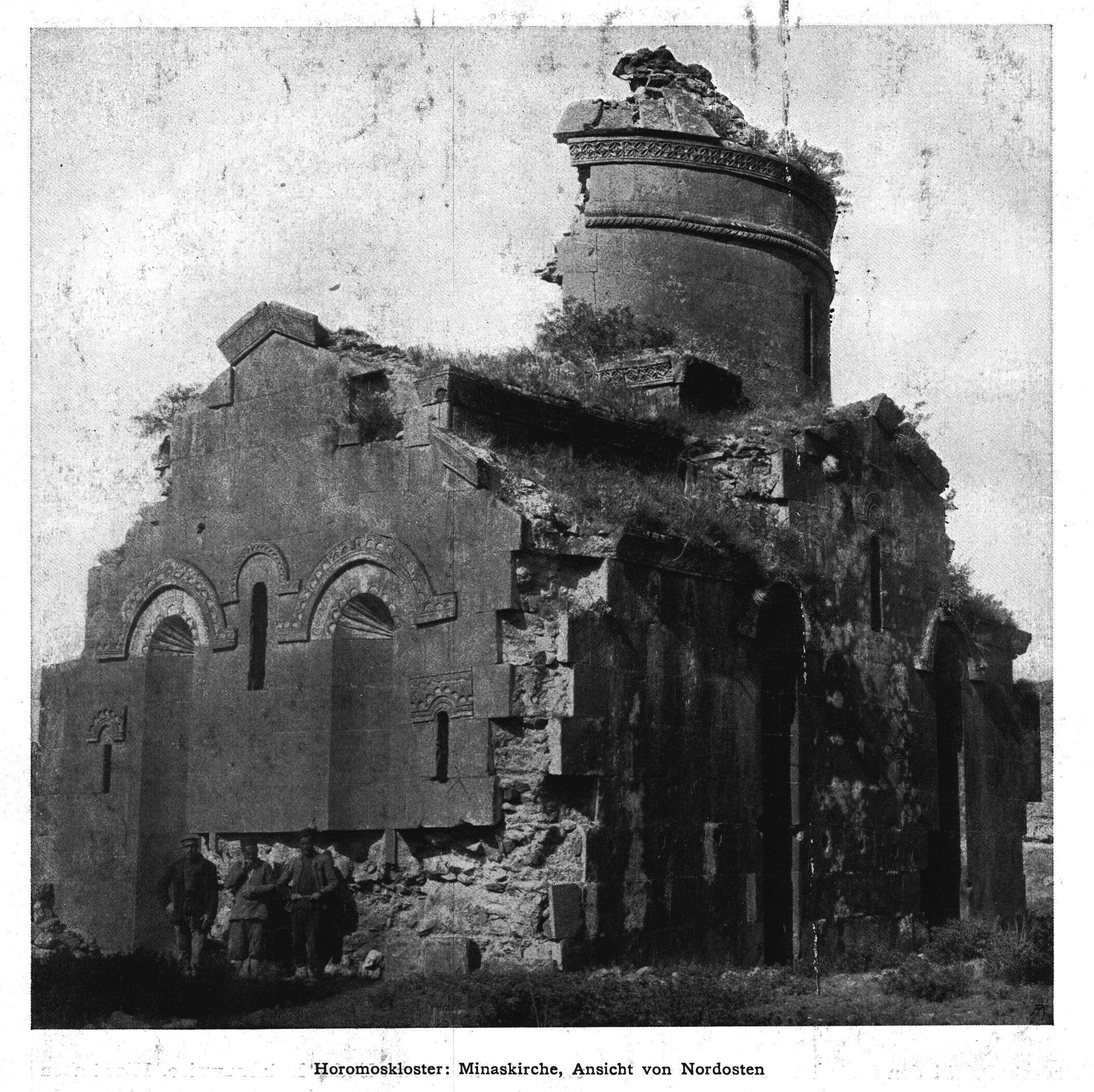

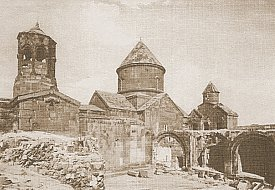

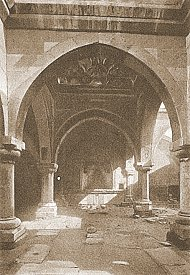
Zhamatun of Aruits

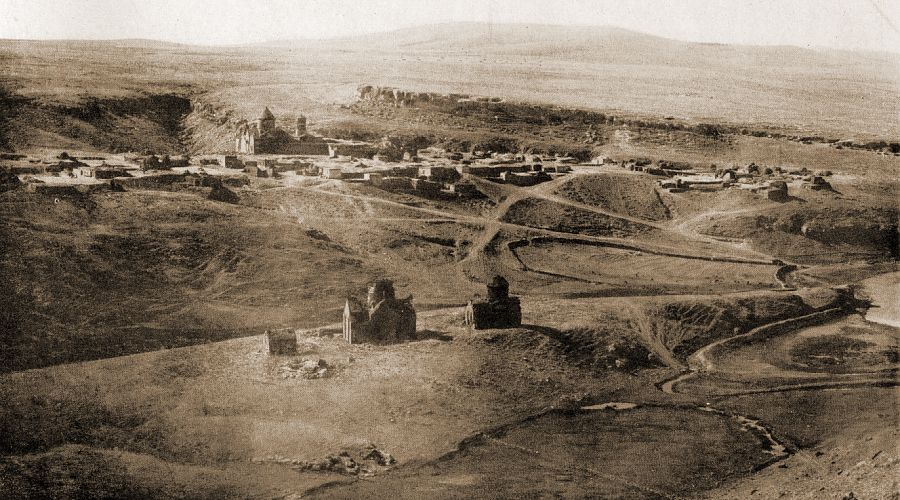

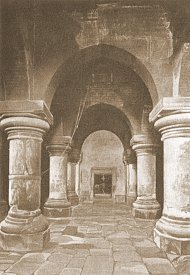
Zhamatun of Saint John church (1038)

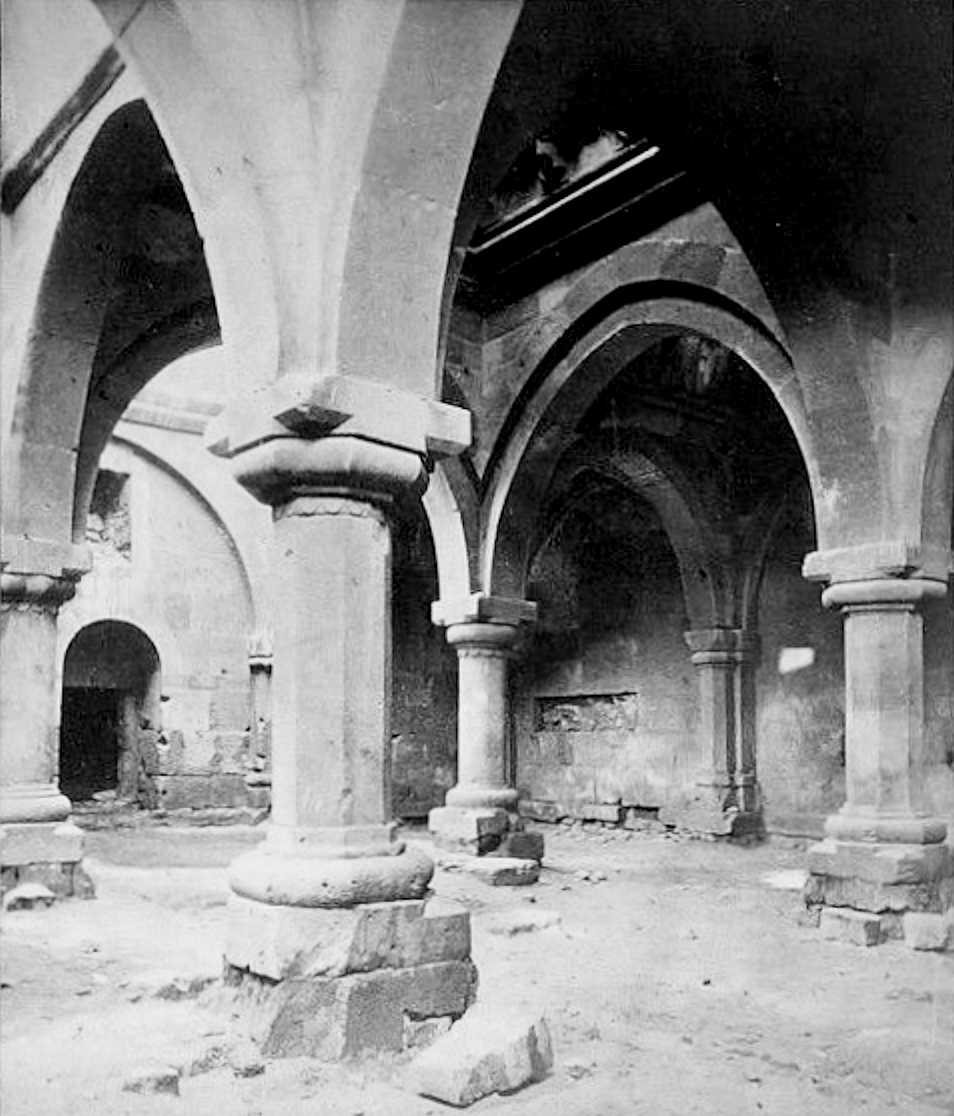
Zhamatun of Aruits

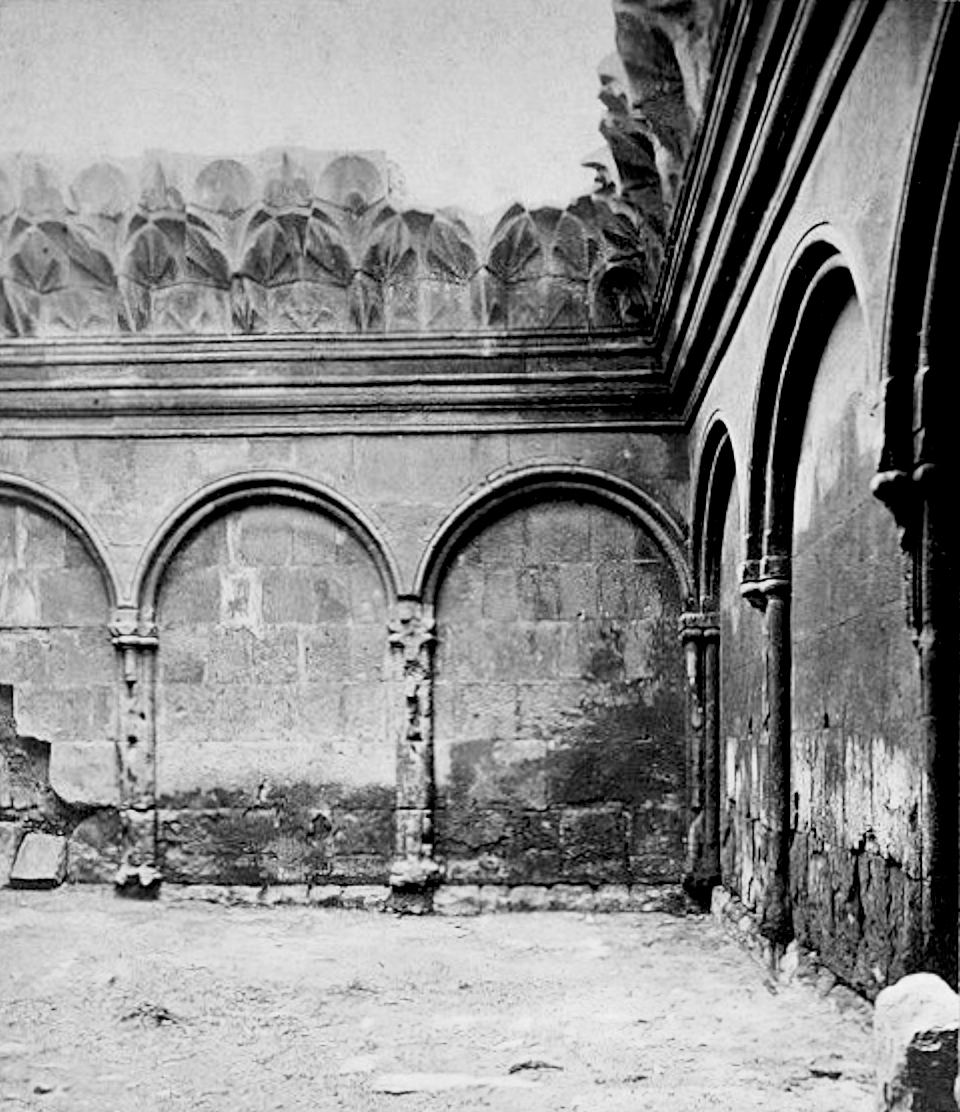
Mausoleum of Prince Vache Vacutian (Governor of Ani 1213-1232), built in 1229

=== Actual state today ===
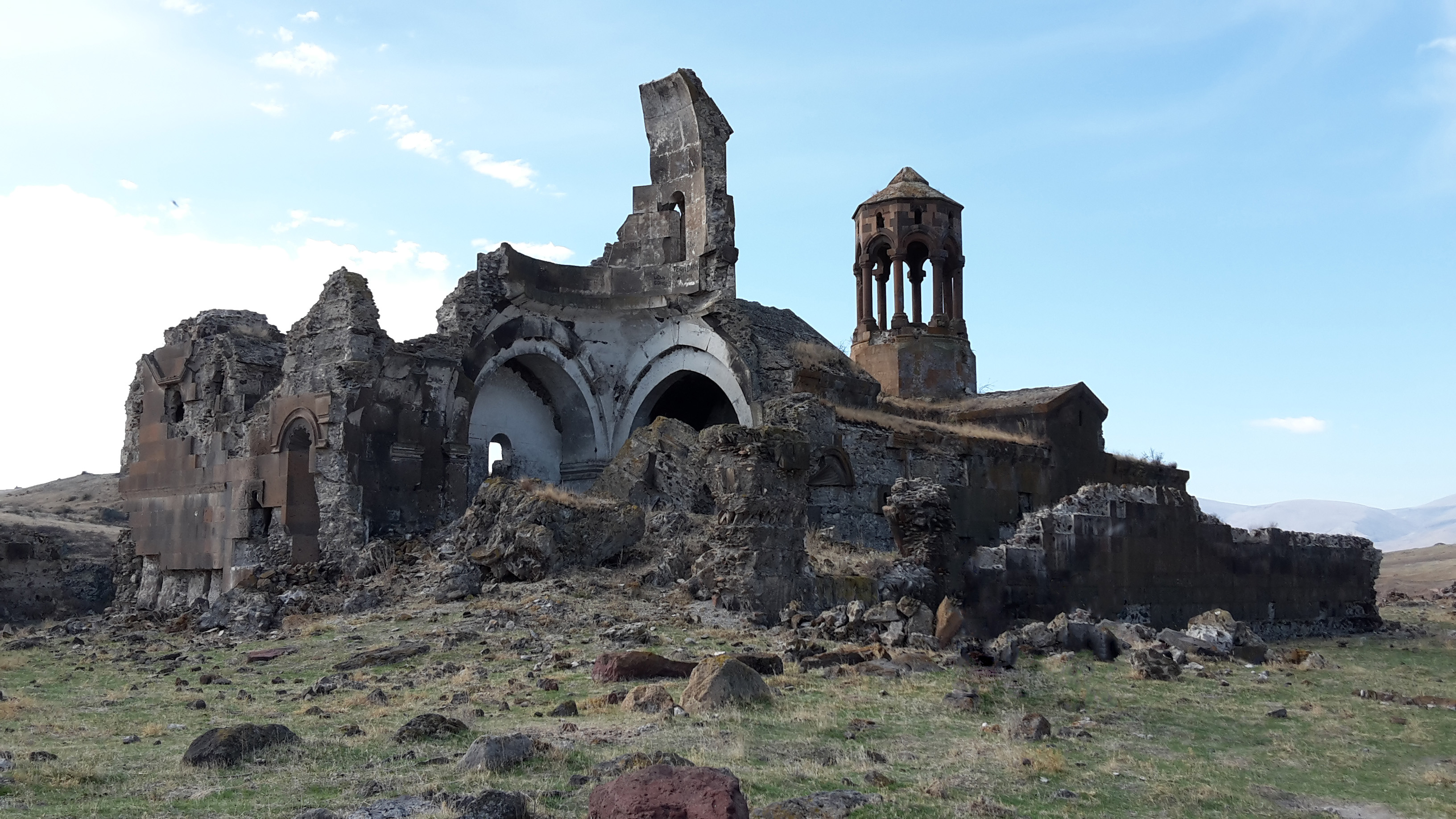

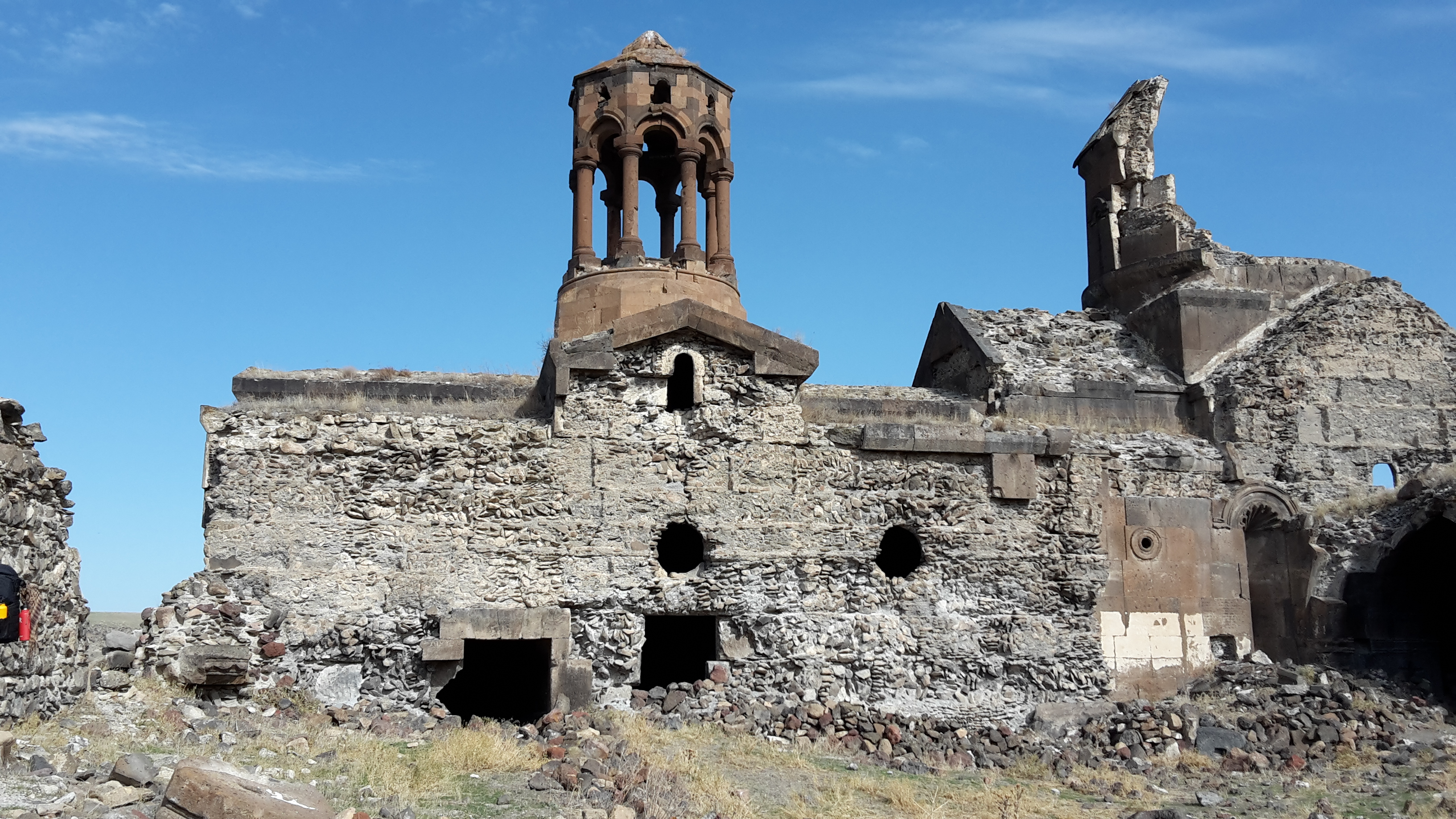
Zhamatun topped by a colonnaded canopy.

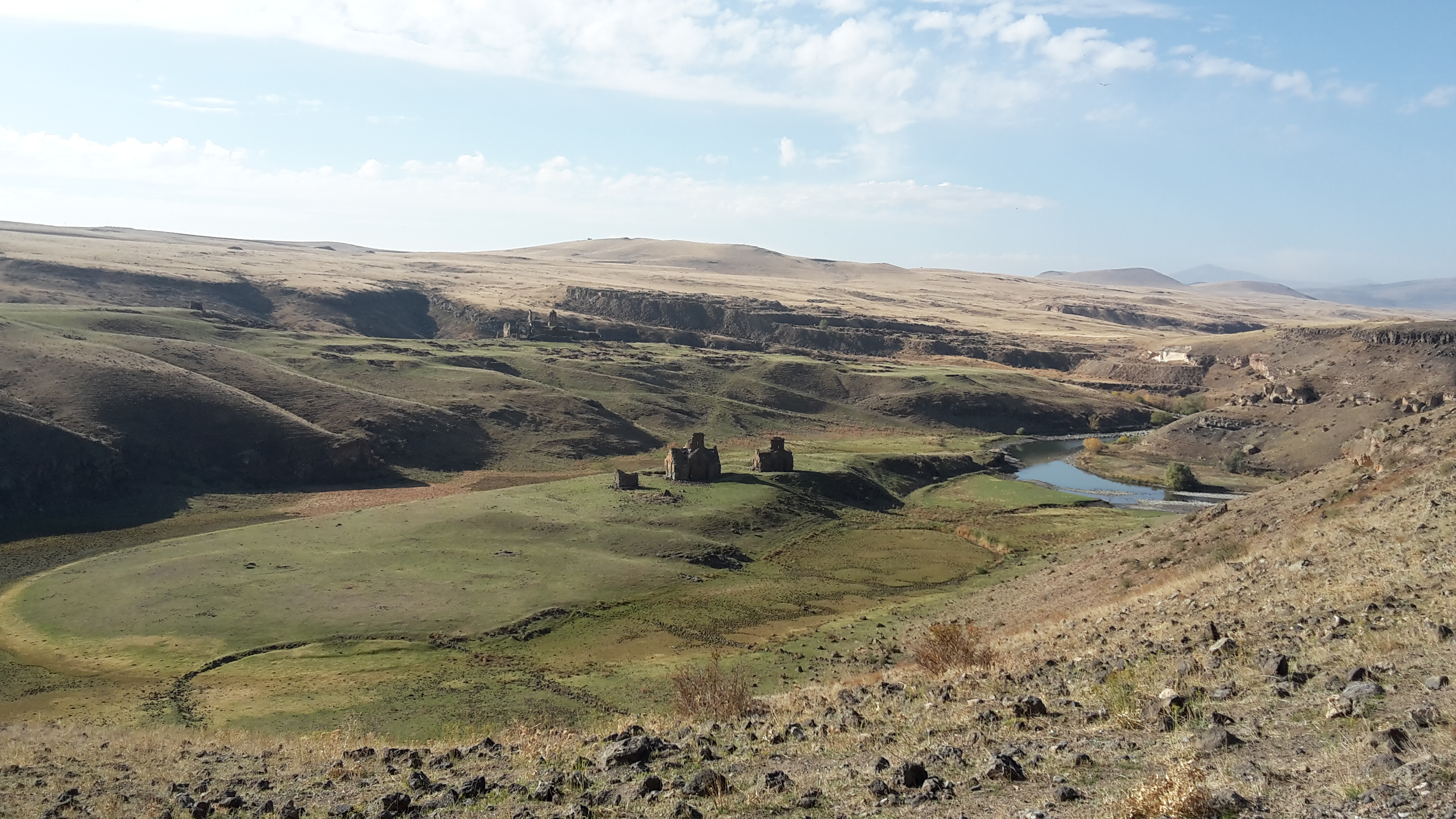

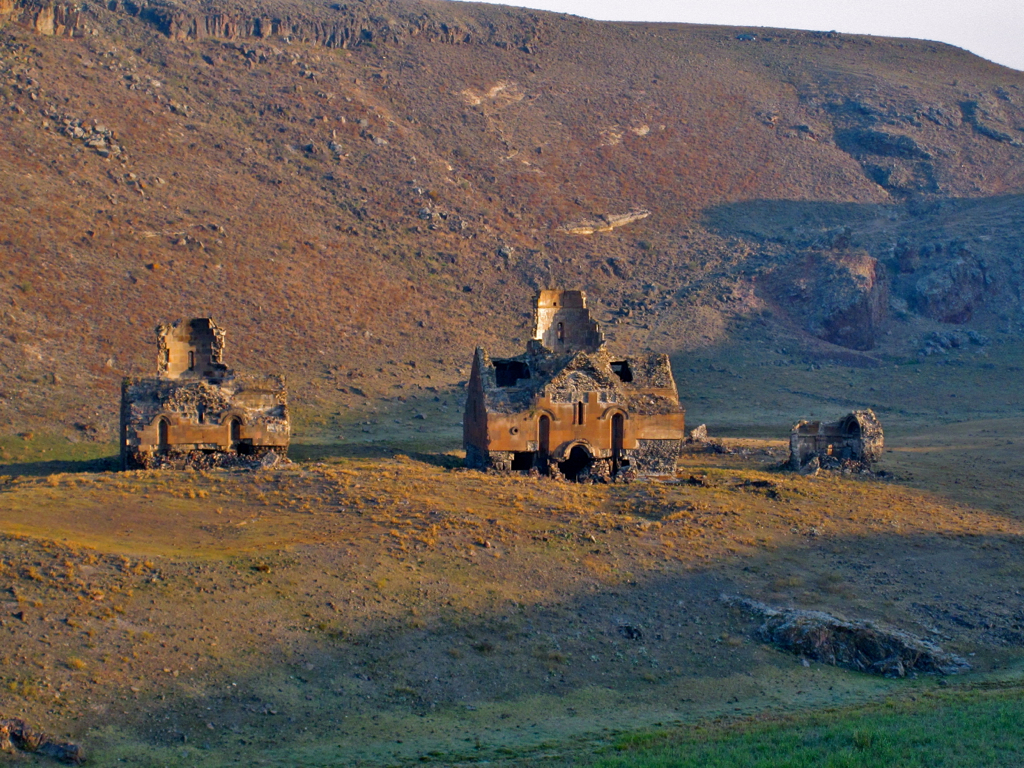

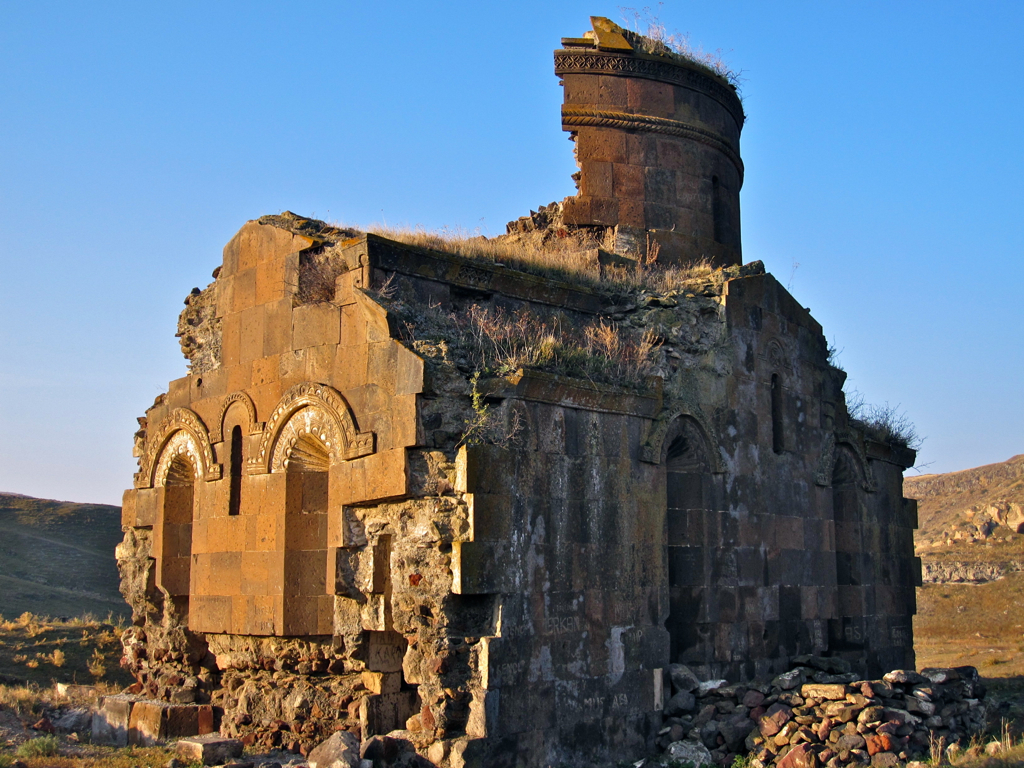
Monastery

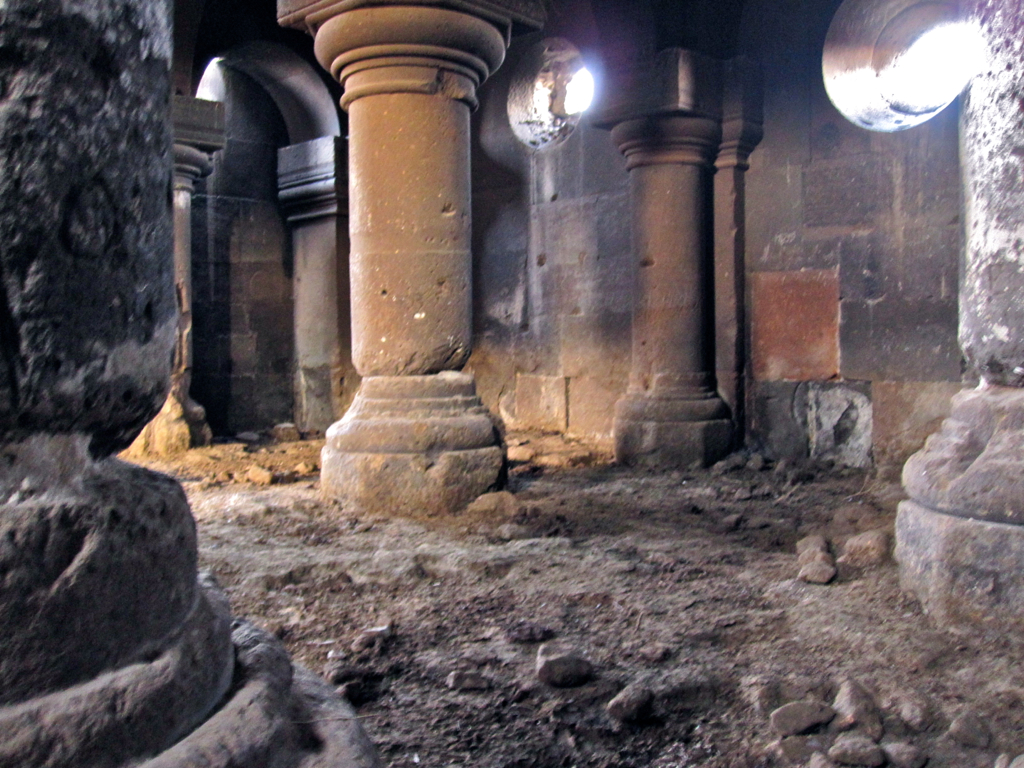
Inside the zhamatun of Saint John church (1038).

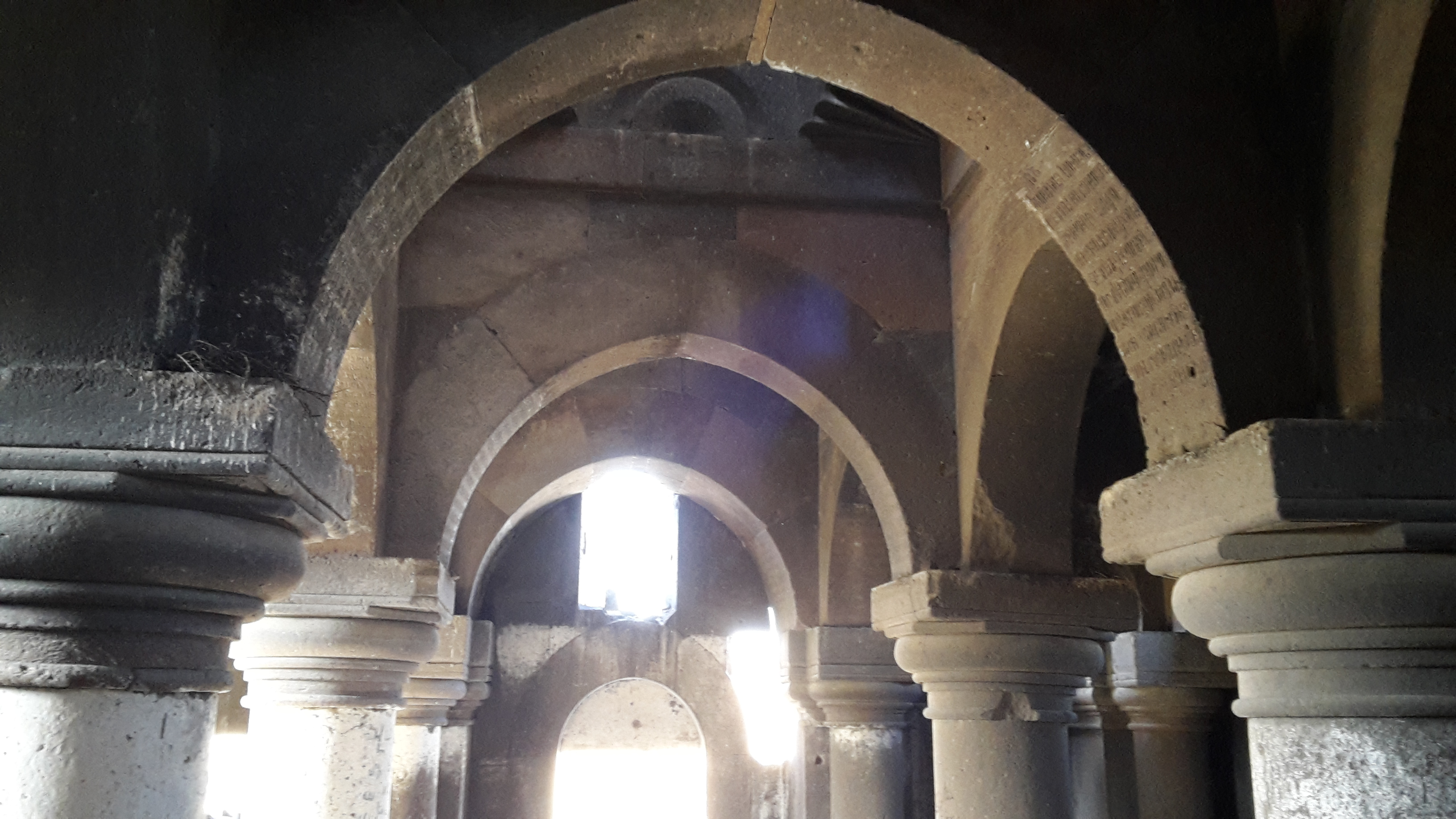
Inside the zhamatun.

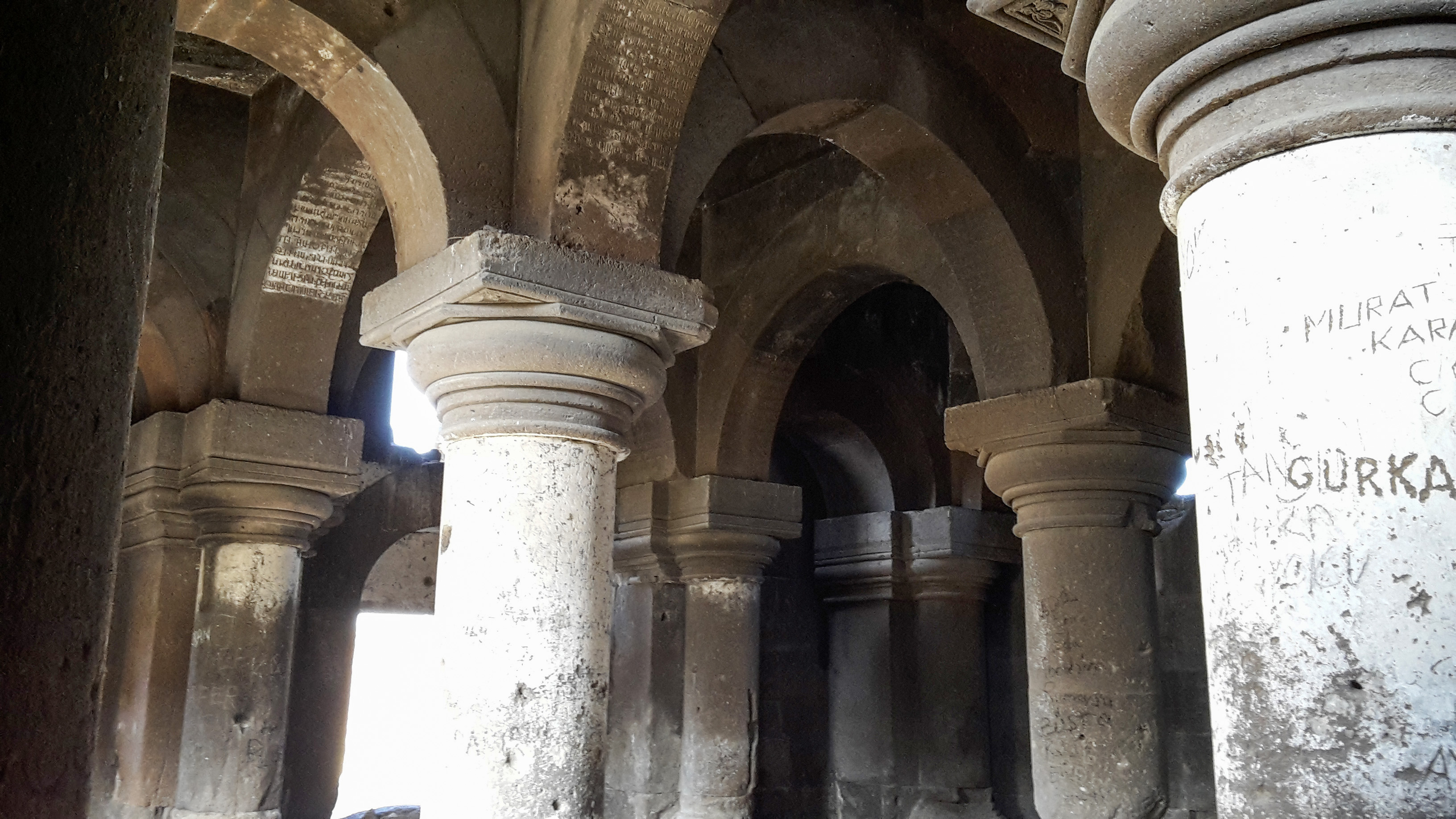
Inside the zhamatun.

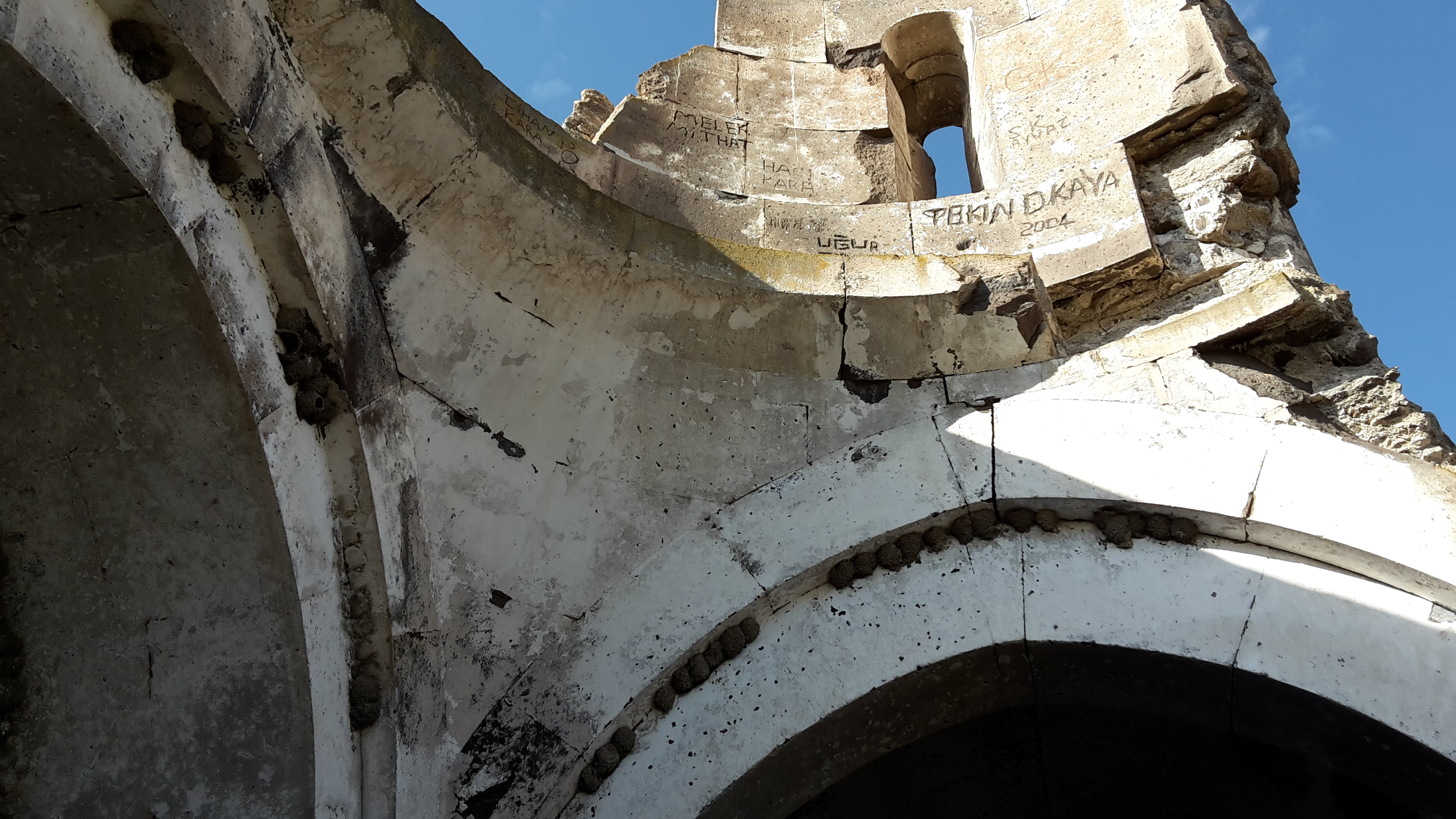
Church of Saint John (1038)

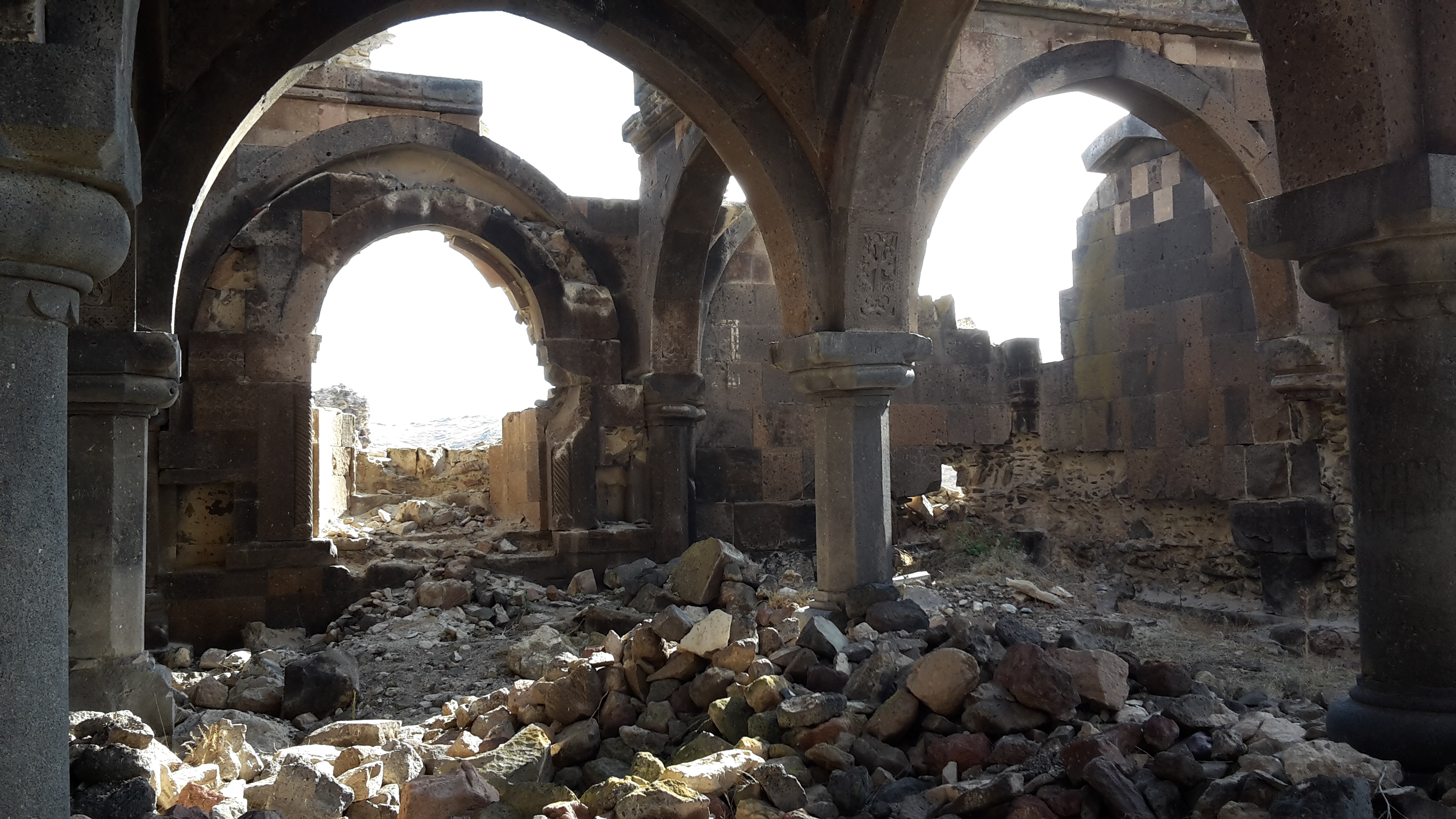
Zhamatun of Aruits

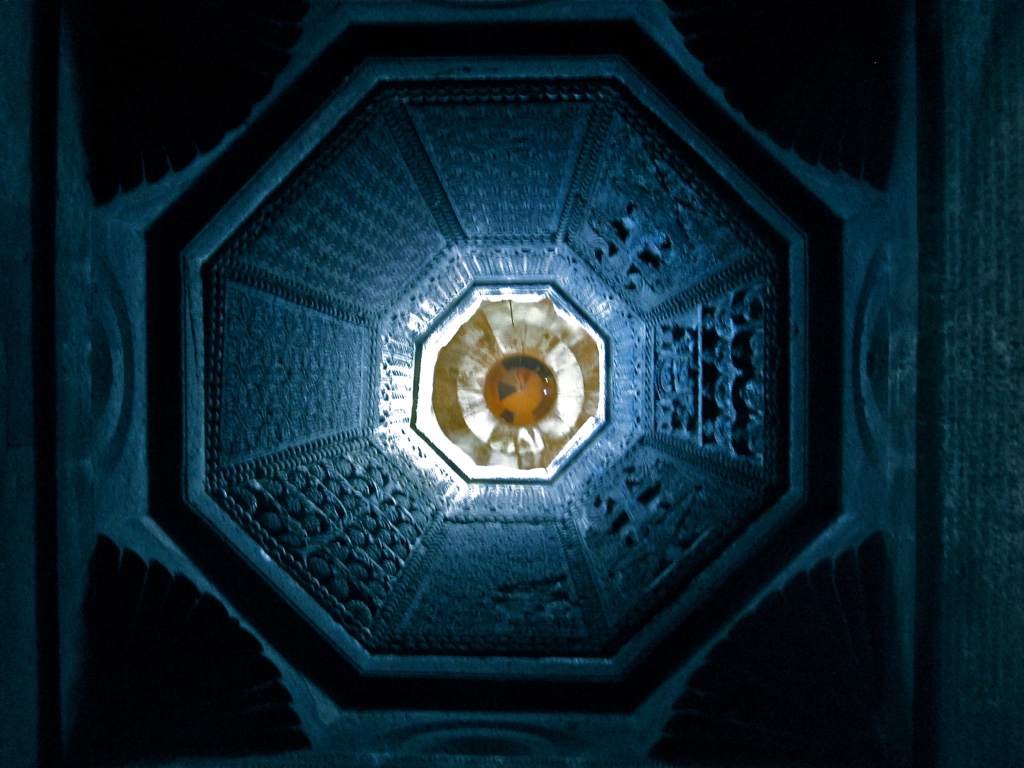
Vaul of the zhamatun of Saint John church (1038).

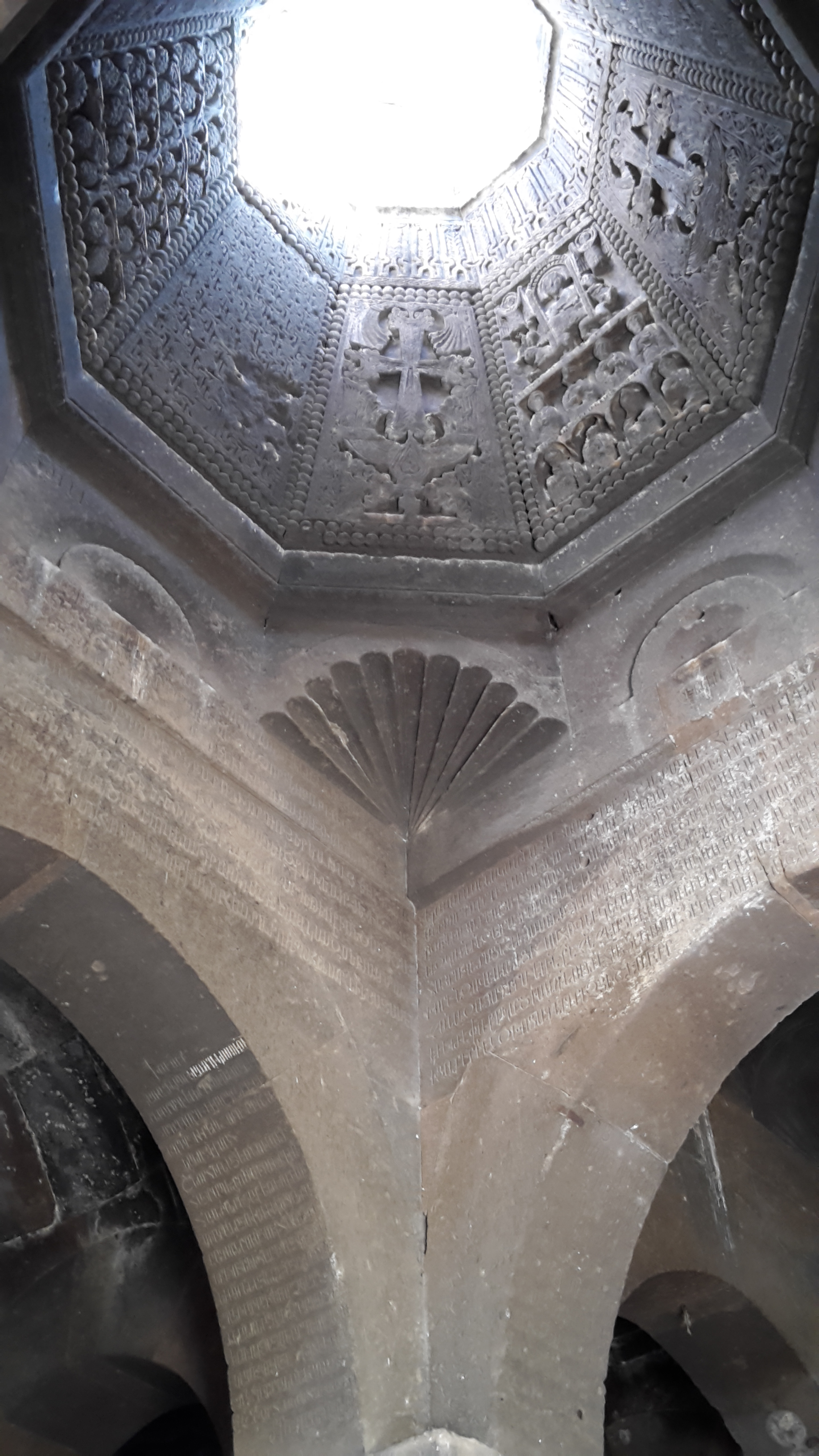
Inside the zhamatun of Saint John church (1038).

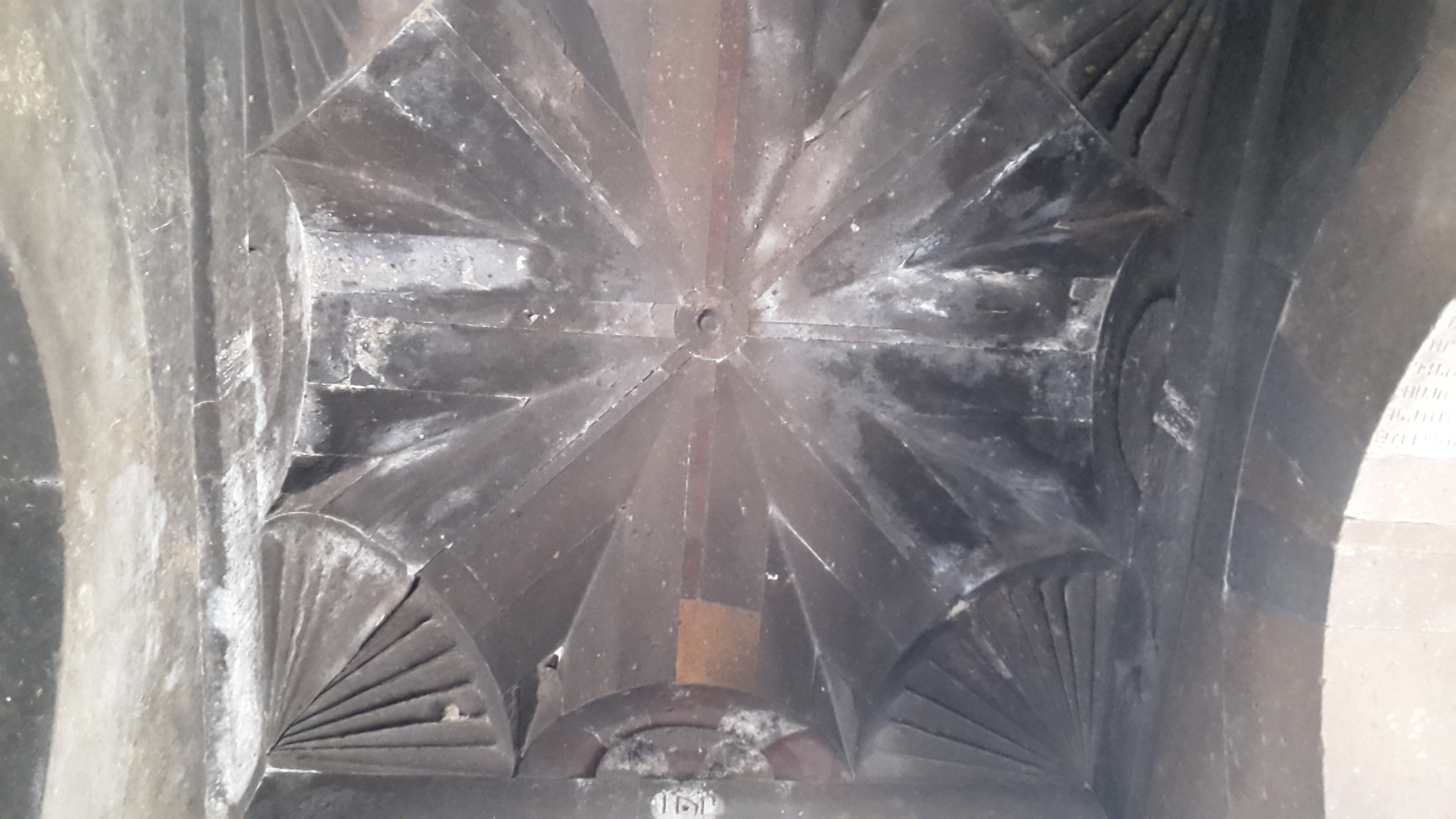
Inside the zhamatun of Saint John church (1038).

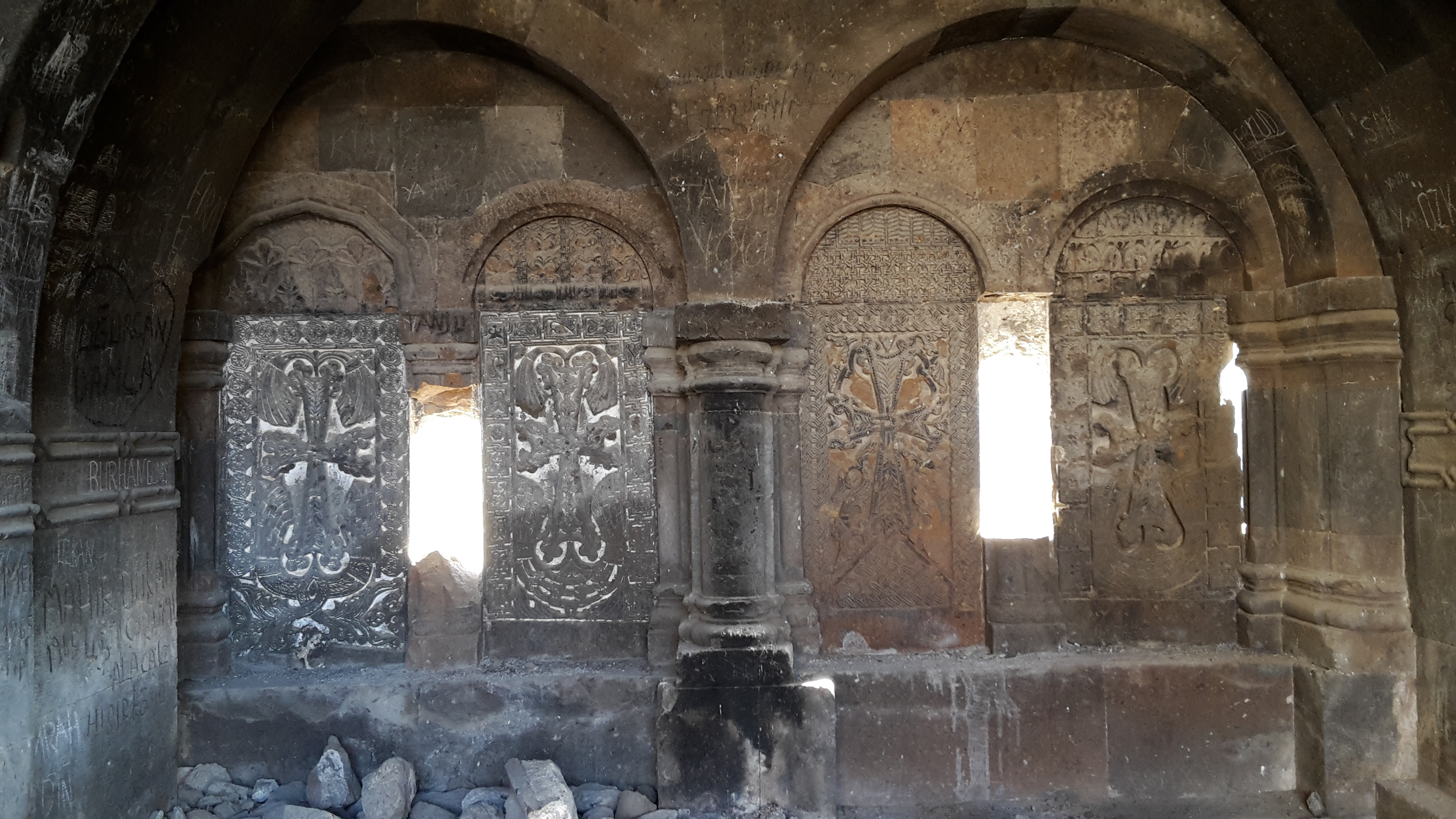
Ruzukan Chapel

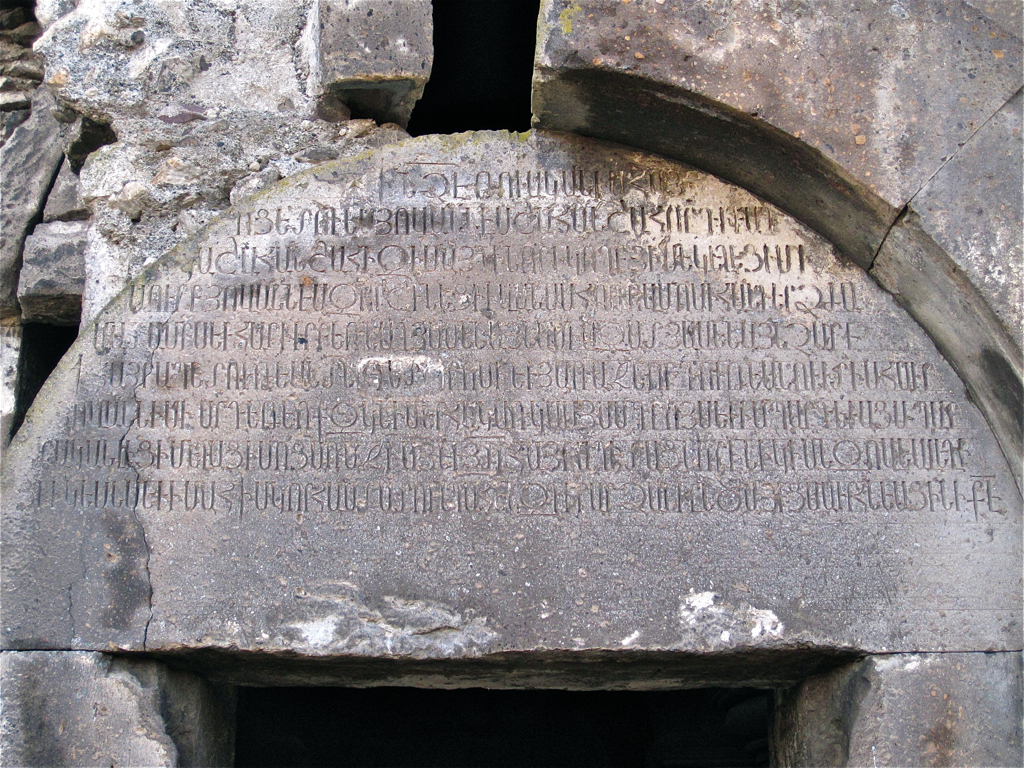
Dedicatory inscription for the gavit, by King Yovhannēs-Smbat in 1038.
