= Siege of Ani =

Battle in Georgia in 1070s

Sieges of Ani
- Part of Byzantine–Seljuq wars, Georgian–Seljuk wars and Mongol invasions of Georgia
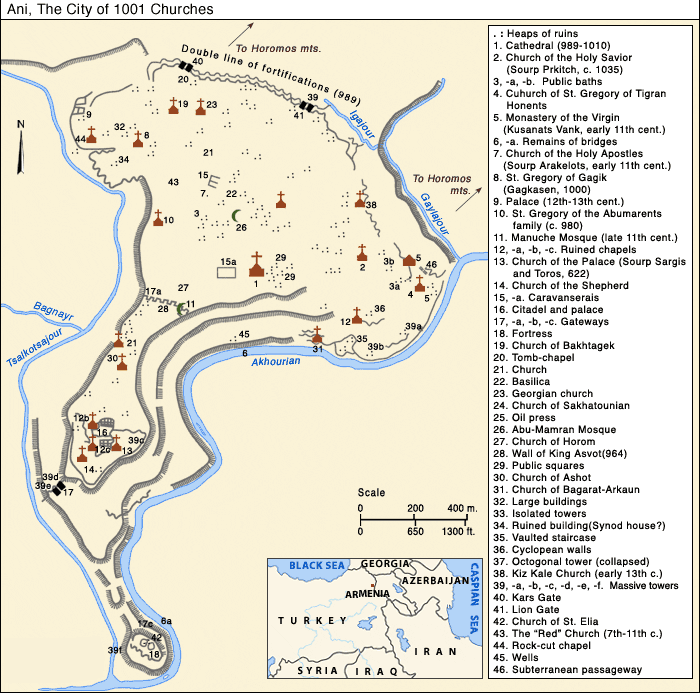
- Plan of the city
| Date | 1064–1239 |
| Location | Ani, modern Kars Province in Turkey 40°30′27″N 43°34′22″E |
| Result | Mongols sack the city |

Belligerents
| Kingdom of Georgia; Zakarid dynasty Armenians | Seljuk Empire; Shaddadids; Eldiguzids; Artuqids; Saltukids; Shah-Armens; Emirate of Kars | Mongol Empire | Byzantine Empire |

Commanders and leaders
| David IV; George III; TamarIvane I Zakarian; Rusudan; Zakare II Zakarian; Shahnshah Zakarian | Alp Arslan; Nizam al-Mulk; Abu'l-Aswar; Fadl ibn Mahmud; Shahanshah ibn Mahmud; Eldiguz; Sultan ibn Mahmud; Sökmen II; Saltuk II | Chagatai; Toghta | Constantine X Doukas; Duke Bagrat; Gregory |

The medieval city of Ani was a center of confrontation in the 12th and 13th centuries. It was captured fives times by the Kingdom of Georgia, and recaptured three times by Shaddadids, until it came under the Mongol rule in 1239:

- Siege of Ani (1064), when a large Seljuk army under Alp Arslan attacked.
- Siege of Ani (1124), a siege led by David IV of Georgia against the Shaddadids during the Georgian–Seljuk wars.
- Siege of Ani (1161), a siege led by the George III of Georgia against the Shaddadids, and a subsequent siege by the Muslim coalition of Shah-Armens, Saltukids, Artuqids and Emirate of Kars against the Kingdom of Georgia in an attempt to recapture the city.
- Siege of Ani (1174), a siege led by George III of Georgia against the Shaddadids.
- Siege of Ani (1199), a siege led by Tamar of Georgia against the Shaddadids.
- Siege of Ani (1226), a siege led by the Mongol Empire against the Zakarid ruler of Ani.
- Siege of Ani (1239), a sack of the city by the Mongols.

== See also ==
- Battle of Ani (1042)

== Bibliography ==
- Minorsky, Vladimir (1953). Studies in Caucasian History. Cambridge University Press. ISBN 9780521057356.
