= Siege of Ani (1161) =

Unsuccessful siege of Ani by the Muslim coalition

- Part of Georgian–Seljuk wars
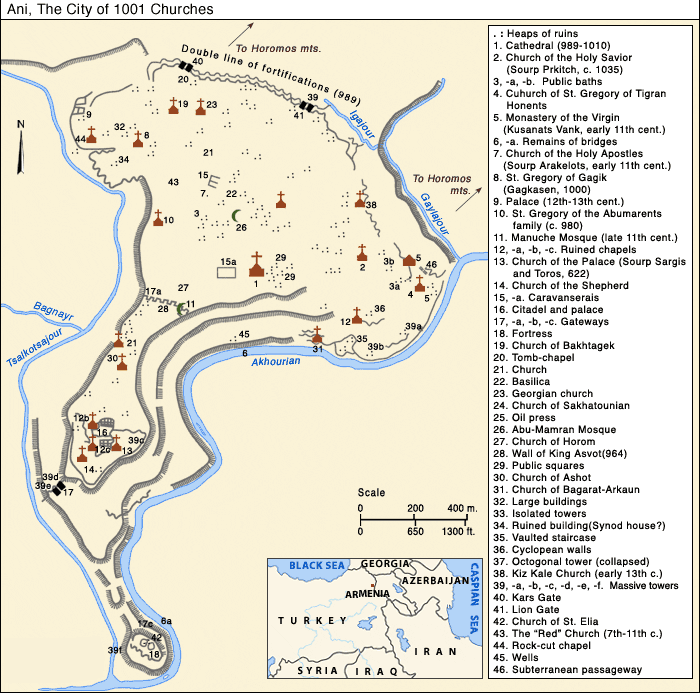
- Plan of the city
Date	August 1161
Location	Ani 40°30′27″N 43°34′22″E
Result	Georgian victory

Belligerents
Kingdom of Georgia	Shah-Armens; Saltukids; Artuqids

Commanders and leaders
George III	Sökmen II; Saltuk II

Casualties and losses
Unknown	9,000 captured

The siege of Ani was the unsuccessful siege of the city of Ani, by the Seljukid coalition arranged by the ruler of Shah-Armens in 1161. The large Muslim army was defeated by the Georgian King George III at the gates of Ani.

== Background ==
The Shaddadid emir of Ani Abu'l-Aswar Shavur ibn Manuchihr was accused by the contemporary Armenian historian Vardan Areveltsi of persecuting Christians and attempting to sell Ani to the emir of Kars. In 1124 the Armenians decided to ask help from the Georgian King David IV, who besieged the city but Ani surrendered without a fight. David IV exiled the emir to Abkhazia and Ani was given by David to his general, Abuleti.

While Armenian Christians welcomed liberation from Muslim rule, many nobles, feared losing their autonomy and sought better terms as Muslim vassals. Demetrius I of Georgia felt it expedient to release Fadl ibn Shavur ibn Manuchihr, Abulsuar's son, who returned to Ani in 1126, swore insincere oath of loyalty to the Georgian King and took back the governorship of the city. In 1130, the Sultan of Khlat launched an attempt to oust Georgians from northern and central Armenia. Demetrius had to come to terms and give up the city to Shaddadids on terms of vassalage. They agreed that the Cathedral of Ani should have remained a Christian site and Georgia could intervene to protect the Christians. However, a stand-off continued for two decades.

Fadl's successor, Fakr al-Din Shaddad ibn Mahmud, asked for Saltuk II's daughter's hand in 1154, however Saltuk refused him. This caused a deep hatred in Shaddad towards Saltuk. He planned a plot and formed a secret alliance with King Demetrius I. While a Georgian army waited in ambush, he offered tribute to Saltukid and asked the latter to accept him as a vassal. In 1154–1155, Emir Saltuk II marched on Ani, but Shaddad informed his suzerain, the King of Georgia, of this. Demetrius marched to Ani, defeated and captured the emir. At the request of neighbouring Muslim rulers, Demetrius released him for a ransom of 100,000 dinars, paid by Saltuk's sons in law and Saltuk swore not to fight against the Georgians.

=== Capture of Ani by George III ===
In 1156 the Christian population of Ani rose against the emir Fakr al-Din Shaddad ibn Mahmud, and turned the town over to his brother, Fadl ibn Mahmud. But Fadl, too, apparently could not satisfy the people of Ani, and this time the town was offered to the Georgian King George III, who took advantage of this offer and subjugated Ani, appointing his general Ivane II Orbeli as its ruler in 1161.

== Siege ==
In July, 1161, a muslim coalition was formed consisting namely of the troops of Shah-Armens, Saltukids, and the lord of Kars and Surmari. Allies selected the route through the Araxes river, and the Artuqid lord Najm al-Din Alpi set out to join them. In August 1161, they arrived before Ani and besieged it. When the King George III has arrived to meet them, the emir Saltuk II, remembering his oath to the King Demetrius, withdrew his army from the battlefield. Muslims were defeated and put to the sword and many of them perished.

== Bibliography ==
- Baumer, Christoph (2021). History of the Caucasus. Volume one, At the crossroads of empires. London: I.B. Tauris. ISBN 978-1-78831-007-9. OCLC 1259549144.
- Peacock, Andrew (2011). "SHADDADIDS". In Yarshater, Ehsan (ed.). Encyclopædia Iranica (Online ed.). Encyclopædia Iranica Foundation.
- Metreveli, Roin (2011). Saint David the Builder. Tbilisi. ISBN 9789941425509.
- Minorsky, Vladimir (1953). Studies in Caucasian History. Cambridge University Press. ISBN 9780521057356.
- Rayfield, Donald (2012). Edge of Empires, a History of Georgia. London: Reaktion Books. ISBN 978-1-78023-070-2.
