= Georgian–Seljuk wars =

Conflicts between the Kingdom of Georgia and the Seljuq Empire from c. 1048 to 1213

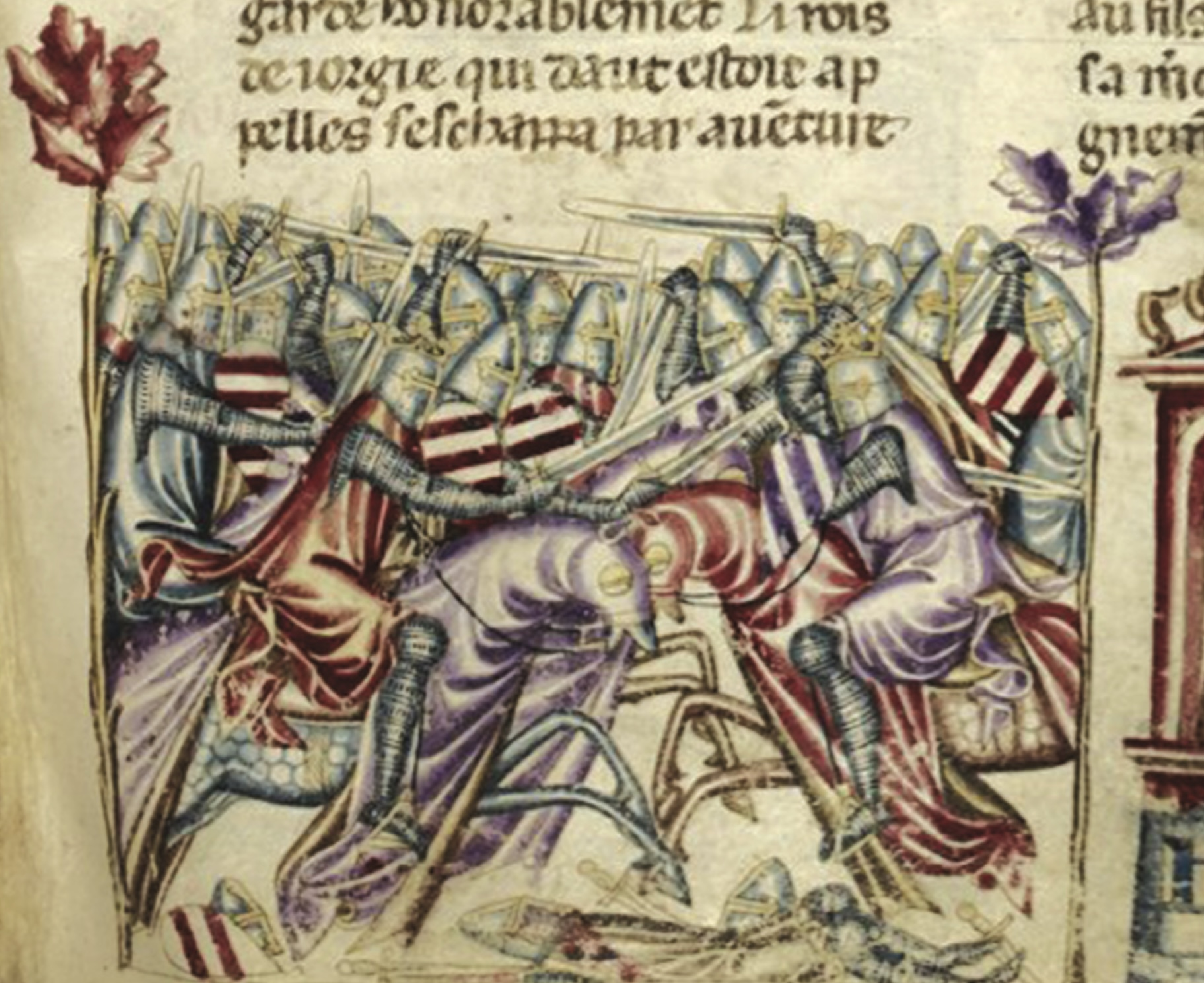
- A miniature depicting a battle with the Georgian king David IV the Builder. Le Roman de Troie by Benoît de Sainte-Maure. King David is shown in purple robe on the right, wearing crown-helmet.
Date	1064–1213
Location	Caucasus, eastern Anatolia
Result	Georgian victory
Territorial changes	Liberation of Tbilisi and most of the South Caucasus

Belligerents
Kingdom of Georgia; Kipchaks; Armenians; Alania	Seljuk Empire; Eldiguzids; Emirate of Tbilisi; Shaddadids; Shah-Armens; Artuqids; Saltukids; Sultanate of Rum; Mengujekids

Commanders and leaders
Bagrat IV; George II; David IV; George of Chqondidi; Barami; Sumbat Orbeli; Ivane I Orbeli; Demetrius I George III; Ivane II Orbeli; Sargis Zakarian; Tamar; Qubasar; David Soslan; Zakare II Zakarian; Ivane I Zakarian; Shalva Akhaltsikheli; George IV; Durgulel the Great	Alp Arslan; Malik-Shah I Nizam al-Mulk; Sarang of Ganja; Muhammad I Tapar; Mahmud II; Ahmad Sanjar; Mesud I Kilij Arslan II; Kaykhusraw I Suleiman II of Rûm; Eldiguz

The Georgian–Seljuk wars (Georgian: საქართველო-სელჩუკთა ომები, romanized: sakartvelo-selchuk'ta omebi), also known as Georgian Crusade, is a long series of battles and military clashes that took place from 1064 until 1213, between the Kingdom of Georgia and the different Seljukid states that occupied most of South Caucasus. The conflict began with deadly raids in the Caucasus by the Turks in the 11th century, known in Georgian historiography as the Great Turkish Invasion.

== Background ==
In 1048–9, the Seljuk Turks under Ibrahim Yinal made their first incursion in Byzantine frontier region of Iberia. The emperor Constantine IX requested help from the Georgian duke Liparit IV of Kldekari, whom the Byzantines had aided in his struggle against the Georgian king Bagrat IV. Liparit, who had been fighting on the Byzantine side, was captured at the Battle of Kapetron. Bagrat took advantage of this, and acquired his possessions.

Although the Byzantine Empire and Georgia had centuries-long cultural and religious ties, and the Seljuqs posed a substantial threat to the empire itself, Constantinople's aggressiveness on the Caucasian political scene contributed to an atmosphere of distrust and recrimination, and prevented the two Christian nations from effective cooperation against the common threat. With assertion of the Georgian Bagratid hegemony in the Caucasus being the cornerstone of Bagrat's reign, his policy can be understood as the attempt to play the Seljuqs and Byzantines off against one another.

== Seljukid invasions ==
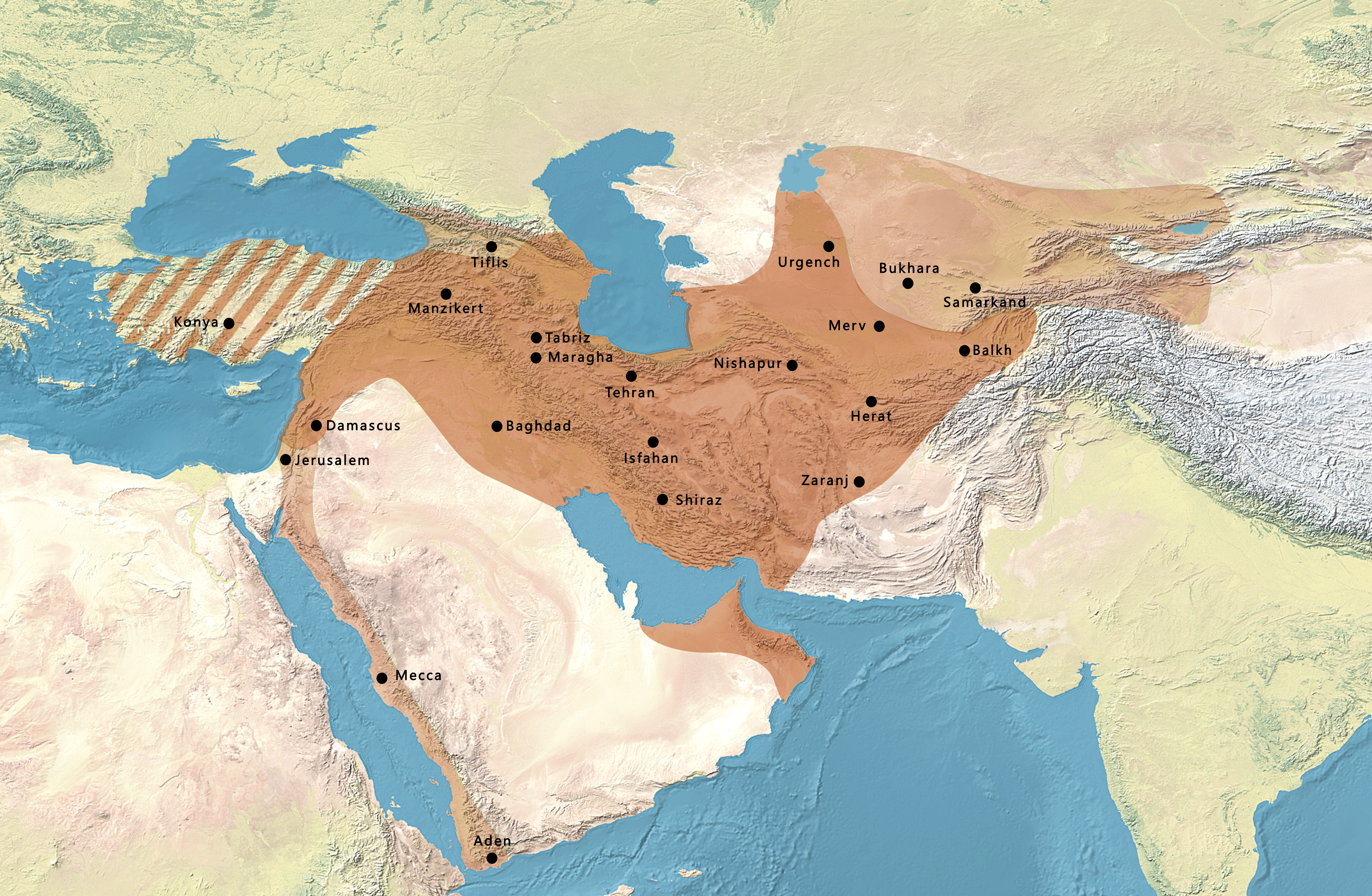
Seljuk Empire circa 1090, during the reign of Malik Shah I. To the west, Anatolia was under the independent rule of Suleiman ibn Qutalmish as the Sultanate of Rum, and disputed with the Byzantine Empire. To the east, the Kara-Khanid Khanate became a vassal state in 1089, for half a century, before falling to the Qara Khitai.

The second half of the 11th century was marked by the strategically significant invasion of the Seljuq Turks, who by the end of the 1040s had succeeded in building a vast empire including most of Central Asia and Persia. These intruders were part of the same wave of the Turkish movement which inflicted a crushing defeat on the Byzantine army at Manzikert in 1071.

The Seljuks first appeared in Georgia in 1064, when Sultan Alp Arslan led an army from Ray to Nakhchivan and captured some castles garrisoned by Byzantine troops. He then handed over the command to his son Malik-Shah and Nizam al-Mulk, they marched westward and captured the Armenian fortified city of Marmashen. Then the Seljuks marched north and captured the Georgian fortified city of Akhalkalaki, which they set on fire. Faced with the growing threat from the east, Georgia and Byzantine overcame their decades-old enmity and entered a matrimonial alliance.

In 1068, Alp Arslan accompanied by his vassals, Aghsartan I of Kakheti and king of Lori as well as the emir of Tbilisi marched against Bagrat again, who had to vacate Kakheti and retreat to Kartli. The provinces of Kartli and Argveti were occupied and pillaged. The retreated king was saved when severe snowfalls set in and Alp Arslan left Kartli. As the Sultan passed Tbilisi, he gave the small emirate to Fadl ibn Shavur. Fadl encamped at Isani and with 33,000 men ravaged the countryside. As soon as Alp Arslan left Georgia, Bagrat quickly recovered Kartli and crushed emir Fadl who managed to flee with a few followers only to fall into the hands of Aghsartan. At the price of conceding several fortresses on the Iori River, Bagrat ransomed Fadl and received from him the surrender of Tbilisi where he reinstated a local emir on the terms of vassalage.

The Seljuk threat prompted the Georgian and Byzantine governments to seek a closer cooperation. To secure the alliance, Bagrat's daughter Maria married, at some point between 1066 and 1071, to the Byzantine co-emperor Michael VII Ducas. The choice of a Georgian princess was unprecedented, and it was seen in Georgia as a diplomatic success on Bagrat's part.

=== Great Turkish Invasion ===
Although the Georgians were able to recover from Alp Arslan's invasion, the Byzantine withdrawal from Anatolia brought them in more direct contact with the Seljuqs. In the 1070s, Georgia was twice attacked by the Sultan Malik Shah I, but the Georgian King George II managed to ward them off at the Battle of Partskhisi in 1074. However, in 1076 Malik Shah surged into Georgia and reduced many settlements to ruins, from 1079/80 onward, George was pressured into submitting to Malik-Shah to ensure a precious degree of peace at the price of an annual tribute. George's acceptance of the Seljuq suzerainty did not bring a real peace for Georgia. The Turks continued their seasonal movement into the Georgian territory to make use of the rich herbage of the Kura valley and the Seljuq garrisons occupied the key fortresses in Georgia's south. These inroads and settlements had a ruinous effect on Georgia's economic and political order. Cultivated lands were turned into pastures for the nomads and peasant farmers were compelled to seek safety in the mountains.

George II was able to garner the Seljuk military support in his campaign against the eastern Georgian kingdom of Kakheti, which had long resisted the Bagratid attempts of annexation. However, tired with a protracted siege of the Kakhetian stronghold of Vezhini, George abandoned the campaign when snow fell. The Seljuk auxiliaries also lifted the siege and plundered the fertile Iori Valley in Kakheti. Aghsartan I, king of Kakheti, went to the sultan to declare his submission, and in token of loyalty embraced Islam, thus winning a Seljuk protection against the aspirations of the Georgian crown.

George II's wavering character and incompetent political decisions coupled with the Seljuk yoke brought the Kingdom of Georgia into a profound crisis which climaxed in the aftermath of a disastrous earthquake that struck Georgia in 1088.

== Georgian Reconquista ==
=== Reign of David IV ===
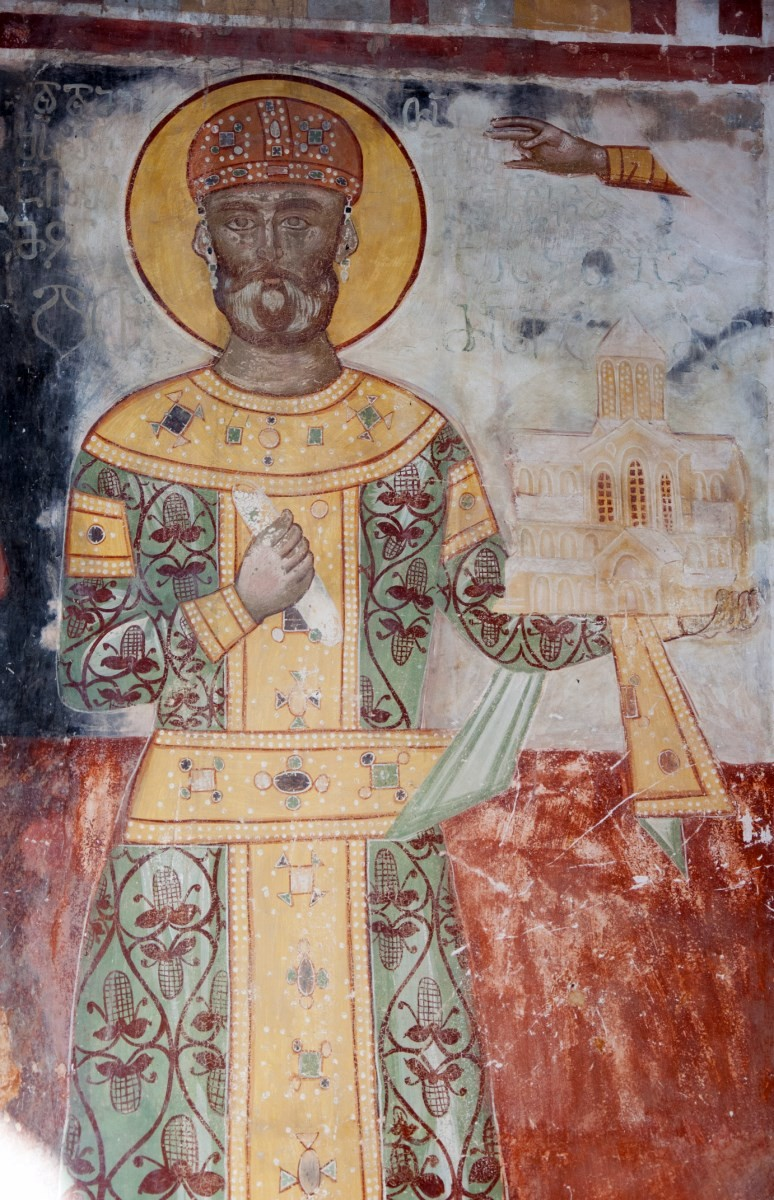
Fresco of David IV at the Gelati Monastery.

In 1110 the Georgians led by George Chqondideli, his nephew Theodore, Abuleti and Ivane Orbelian, retaliated against the Seljuk settlement and recaptured the town of Samshvilde, which was added to the royal domains, without a major battle. Following this capture, the Seljuks left a large part of their captured territories, allowing Georgian troops to capture Dzerna.

Responding to this double defeat, Sultan Muhammad I Tapar in 1110, sent a large army with the aim of invading Georgia. Knowing of the approach of Turkish troops, David IV left his home at Nacharmagevi with a personal guard of only 1,500 men and set out to meet the invaders during the night. The two armies, clearly unequal, clashed the next day at the Battle of Trialeti in a hard fight which ended in a decisive victory for Georgia.

The Battle of Trialeti deprived the Seljuk Empire of the opportunity to conduct a major military campaign against Georgia. In 1110–1114, David IV did not conduct active military operations either. In 1115, Roger of Salerno defeated the Atabag of Mosul at the Battle of Sarmin. After that, David became active again and in 1115-1118 he captured Rustavi, Lori, and Agarani and also defeated the Seljuks at the Battle of Rakhsi.

Problems began to crop up for David now. His population, having been at war for the better part of twenty years, needed to be allowed to become productive again. Also, his nobles were still making problems for him, along with the city of Tbilisi which still could not be liberated from Seljuk grasp. Again David was forced to solve these problems before he could continue the reclamation of his nation and people. For this purpose, David IV radically reformed his military. He resettled a Kipchak tribe of 40,000 families from the Northern Caucasus in Georgia in 1118–1120. Every Georgian and Kipchak family was obliged to provide one soldier with a horse and weapons. Kipchaks were settled in different regions of Georgia. Some were settled in Inner Kartli province, others were given lands along the border. They were Christianized and quickly assimilated into Georgian society.

In February 1116 by the order of David IV, the army of Kartli and Meskhetians were gathered at Klarjeti, David IV suddenly attacked and destroyed the Turks in Tao and captured Tao-Klarjeti and the numerous riches left by the Turks. In February 1120, David IV defeated the Seljuks at the Battle of Botora. In the battle the Georgians captured many opponents and gained a lot of booty.

In November 1120, David's army attacked and defeated the Seljuks in Arsharunik and Sevgelamej, And in 1121 he did the same in Khunan. In June 1121, David with the Kipchaks raided the camped Seljuks in Barda. In all these episodes the camp was destroyed meaning that the Georgian army managed to secretly approach it and perform a surprise attack.

In 1121, Sultan Mahmud b. Muhammad (1118–1131) declared a holy war on Georgia and rallied a large coalition of Muslim states led by the Artuqid Ilghazi and Toğrul b. Muhammad. The size of the Muslim army is still a matter of debate with numbers ranging from a fantastic 600,000 men (Walter the Chancellor's Bella Antiochena, Matthew of Edessa) to 400,000 (Smbat Sparapet's Chronicle) to modern Georgian estimates of 250,000–400,000 men. All sources agree that the Muslim powers gathered an army that was much larger than the Georgian force of 56,000 men. However, on 12 August 1121, King David routed the enemy army on the field of Didgori, achieving what is often considered the greatest military success in Georgian history. The victory at Didgori signaled the emergence of Georgia as a great military power and shifted the regional balance in favor of Georgian cultural and political supremacy. Following his success, David captured Tbilisi, the last Muslim enclave remaining from the Seljuk occupation, in 1122 and moved the Georgian capital there and inaugurated Georgia's Golden Age.

Ani's Armenians appealed to King David IV to capture Ani, taking this opportunity in hand, David IV summoned all his armies and entered Armenia with 60,000 men to take the city. Without a single fight, the Armenian population of Ani opened the gates to the Georgians, who captured emir Abu'l-Aswar Shavur ibn Manuchihr and exiled him and his family to Abkhazia. The region was then left to the governance of the Meskhetian nobility, to General Abuleti and his son Ivane. Northern Armenia was thus annexed and incorporated into the Kingdom of Georgia, increasing the power of David IV in the region.

=== Georgian conquest of Shirvan ===
The recapture of Tbilisi in 1122 by David IV thus established the Kingdom of Georgia as the supreme protector of Christianity in the Caucasus, and the Georgians now attempted to assert their domination by trying to reduce the Muslim presence in the region, which was considered an ally of the Seljuk Empire. This was the case in Shirvan, whose sovereign, who had already been defeated several times by Georgian troops, remained too independent of Georgian power and was forcibly replaced by David IV's sons-in-law, Manuchihr III, in 1120. The Seljuks, alarmed by the situation in Caucasus, decided to respond militarily.

Sultan Mahmud II soon resumed the war against Georgia, despite his defeat at the Battle of Didgori a year earlier. In November 1122, he began his invasion of Shirvan and captured Tabriz, before reaching the local capital, Shamakhi, the following spring. Mahmud then captured the Shirvanshah Manuchihr III and sent a letter to David IV saying: "You are the king of the forests, and you never go down to the plains. Now I have captured the Shirvanshah and I demand Kharaj [tribute] from him. If you wish, send me suitable gifts; if not, come and see me in all haste". Following this provocation, David IV called in all his troops and assembled an army of 50,000 men, most of them Kipchaks. The Seljuk sultan locked himself in Shamakhi after learning of the arrival of the Georgian troops, prompting David IV to halt his advance, deeming it disrespectful to pursue a retreating army. Mahmud II then offered David IV the opportunity to regain control of his vassal province if he let him leave in peace, but the Georgian king categorically refused and resumed his march towards the Shirvan capital after defeating an army of 4,000 Turks led by the atabeg of Arran, Aqsunqur Ahmadili, which was on its way to help Mahmud II. Once he had laid siege to Shamakhi, the Seljuk left the city in a hurry via the commune's excrement drainage system. In June 1123, a month after the Seljuk defeat, David IV invaded Shirvan, starting by capturing the town of Gulistan.

Another military campaign was organized in September 1124 in Shirvan, under obscure circumstances. David IV managed to recover Shamakhi and took the citadel of Bigrit, before strengthening his power in Hereti and Kakheti by leaving strong garrisons of soldiers there. David IV completely freed Shirvan from the Seljuks and annexed the western Shirvan, handing its government over to Mtsignobartukhutsesi Simon. David IV left the eastern Shirvan to his son-in-law, Manuchihr III as a Georgian protectorate.

David IV's battles were of great importance both for Georgia and, especially, for Shirvan. The joint struggle of the Georgians and the people of Shirvan ensured the independence of Shirvan from the Seljuk conquerors. From now on, Georgia and Shirvan became closer to each other.

=== Reign of Demetrius I ===
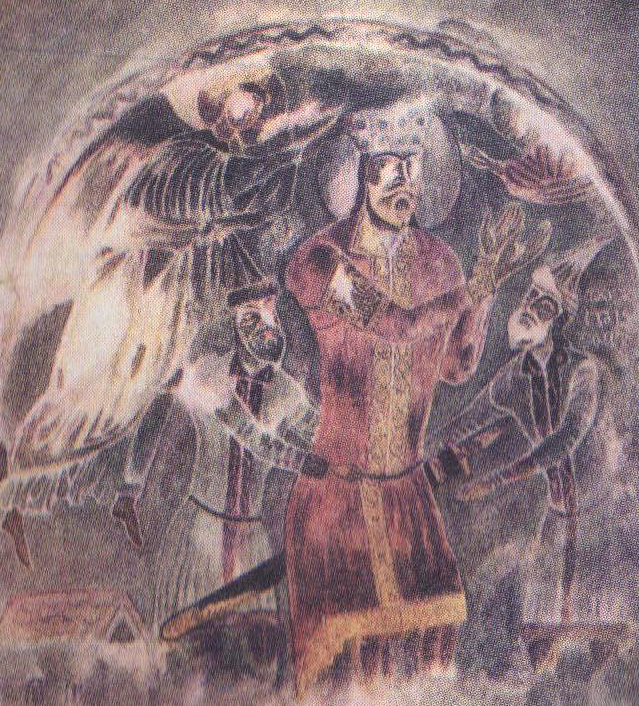
Demetrius I by Michael Maglakeli, from Matskhvarishi, 1140.

The kingdom continued to flourish under Demetrius I, the son of David. Although his reign saw a disruptive family conflict related to royal succession, Georgia remained a centralized power with a strong military. As soon as he ascended to the throne, the neighbouring Muslim rulers began attacking Georgia from all sides. The Seljuqid sultans fought to restore the rule of the Shirvanshahs. Shirvan's large Muslim population rose against Georgia. This probably happened in 1129 or 1130, when Demetrius restored the Shirvanshahs to power in Shirvan, installing on the throne Manuchihr II, the husband of his daughter Rusudan. Shirvanshahs had to provide the Georgian king with troops whenever the latter demanded it.

In 1139, Demetrius raided the city of Ganja in Arran. He brought the iron gate of the defeated city to Georgia and donated it to Gelati Monastery at Kutaisi. Despite this brilliant victory, Demetrius could hold Ganja only for a few years. In reply to this, the sultan of Eldiguzids attacked Ganja several times, and in 1143 the town again fell to the sultan. According to Mkhitar Gosh, Demetrius ultimately gained possession of Ganja, but, when he gave his daughter in marriage to the sultan, he presented the latter with the town as dowry, and the sultain appointed his own emir to rule it.

Fadl's successor, Fakr al-Din Shaddad, a Shaddadid emir of Ani asked for Saltuk's daughter's hand, however Saltuk refused him. This caused a deep hatred in Shaddad towards Saltuk. In 1154 he planned a plot and formed a secret alliance with the Demetrius I. While a Georgian army waited in ambush, he offered tribute to Saltukids, ruler of Erzerum and asked the latter to accept him as a vassal. In 1153–1154 Emir Saltuk II marched on Ani, but Shaddad informed his suzerain, the King of Georgia, of this. Demetrius marched to Ani, defeated and captured the emir. At the request of neighbouring Muslim rulers and released him for a ransom of 100,000 dinars, paid by Saltuk's sons in law and Saltuk swore not to fight against the Georgians he returned home.

=== Reign of George III ===
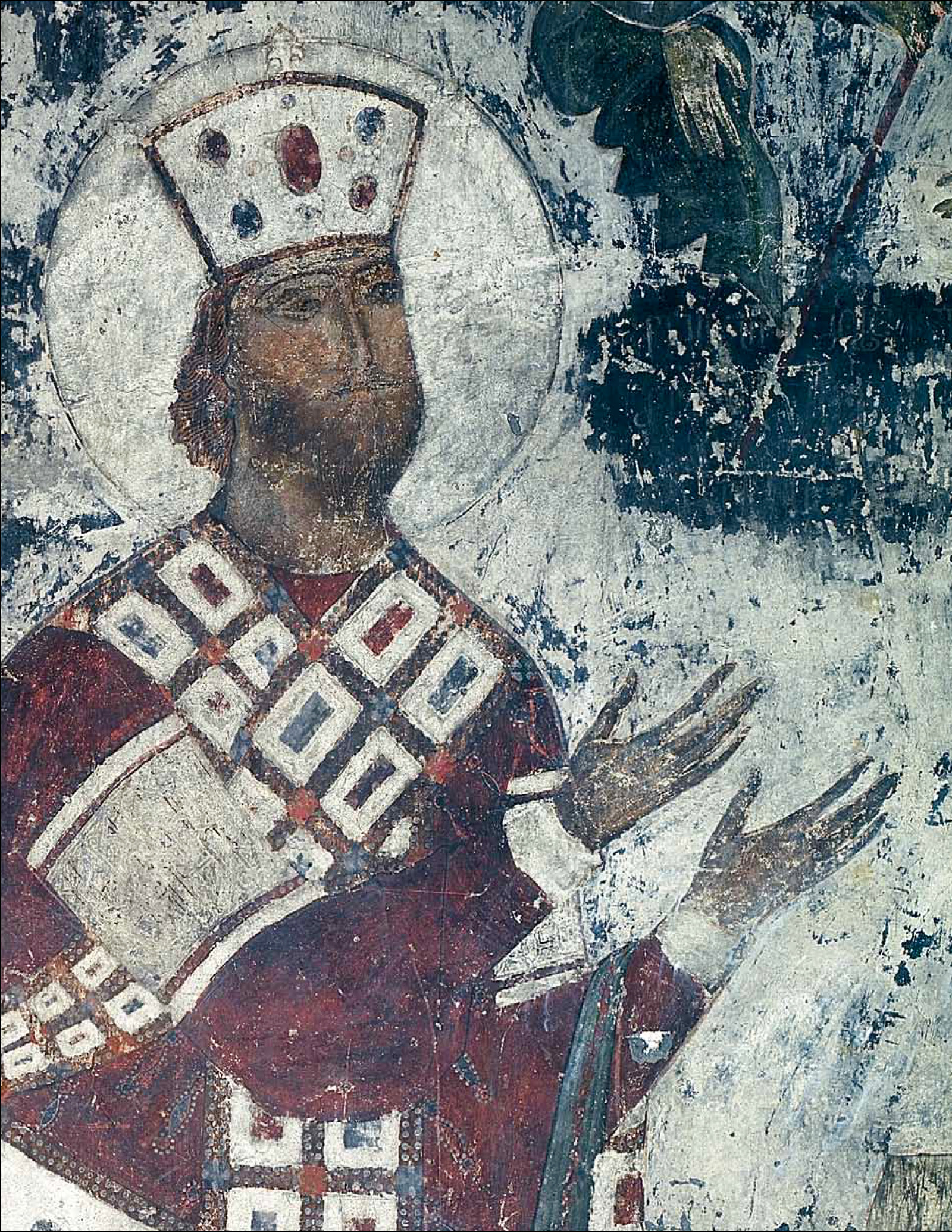
George III of Georgia, as depicted on a medieval fresco from the cave monastery of Vardzia.

In 1156 the Ani's Christian population rose against the emir Fakr al-Din Shaddad, and turned the town over to his brother Fadl ibn Mahmud. But Fadl, too, apparently could not satisfy the people of Ani, and this time the town was offered to the George III, who took advantage of this offer and subjugated Ani, he took much loot from Ani and carried off into captivity the whole family of Shaddadids, including Fadl. Appointing his general Ivane Orbeli as its ruler in 1161.

In July, 1161 troops of a Muslim coalition consisting, namely those of the Shah-Armens of Ahlat, Saltukids of Erzerum, and the lord of Kars and Surmari was formed. Allies selected the route through the river Araxes, and the Artuqid lord Najm al-din set out to join them. In August, 1161 they arrived before Ani and besieged it. When the king George III of Georgia has arrived to meet them, the emir Saltuk II remembering his oath to the king Demetrius, lifted the siege and left the battlefield. Muslims were defeated and put to the sword and many of them perished. King George liberated the people of Ani who had been taken captive and gave the devastated town assistance. He then marched against the Saltuk II, and in the same year, 1161, defeated and made him prisoner, who was redeemed by his sister, Shahbanu Hatun, wife of the ruler of Ahlat.

Georgians then entered in Shah-Armen possessions and looted Van. Some 9,000 Muslims, including the nobles and members Sökmen II family were taken as prisoner. The news of the defeat reached the lord Najm ad-din when he had arrived in Malazgirt, the latter went back to Mayyafariqin without having joined Shah-Armens or taken part in the battle.

The capture of Ani and the defeat of the Saltukid forces enabled the Georgian king to march on Dvin. The following year in August/September 1162, Dvin was temporarily captured and sacked, the non-Christian population was pillaged and the Georgian troops returned home loaded with booty. The king appointed Ananiya, a member of the local feudal nobility to govern the town.

Shams al-Din Eldiguz, ruler of Azerbaijan embarked upon a campaign against Kingdom of Georgia in early 1163. The Seljukid Sultan, Arslan marching from Hamadan met Eldiguz in Nakhchavan. He was joined by the Sökmen II the ruler of Ahlat, Saltuk II the ruler of Erzurum, As-Sunkur the ruler of Maragha, and many others. With an army of 50,000 troops they marched on Georgia. In 1163 Eldiguz attacked Mren (north of Dvin) where he burnt the fortress, with 4,000 Christians in it. On 9 July 1163 Seljuks inflicted a heavy defeat on Georgians. They penetrated into the fortress al-Krkri (Gyargyar) where a battle took place, where Georgians sustained a most ignominious defeat. George III was put to flight. Then Seljuks took the fortress of Gagi, laid waste as far as the region of Gagi and Gegharkunik, seized prisoners and booty, and then moved to Ani. In April, 1164 Georgians evacuated the town. Eldiguz arrived and gave Ani to the emir Shahanshah ibn Mahmud.

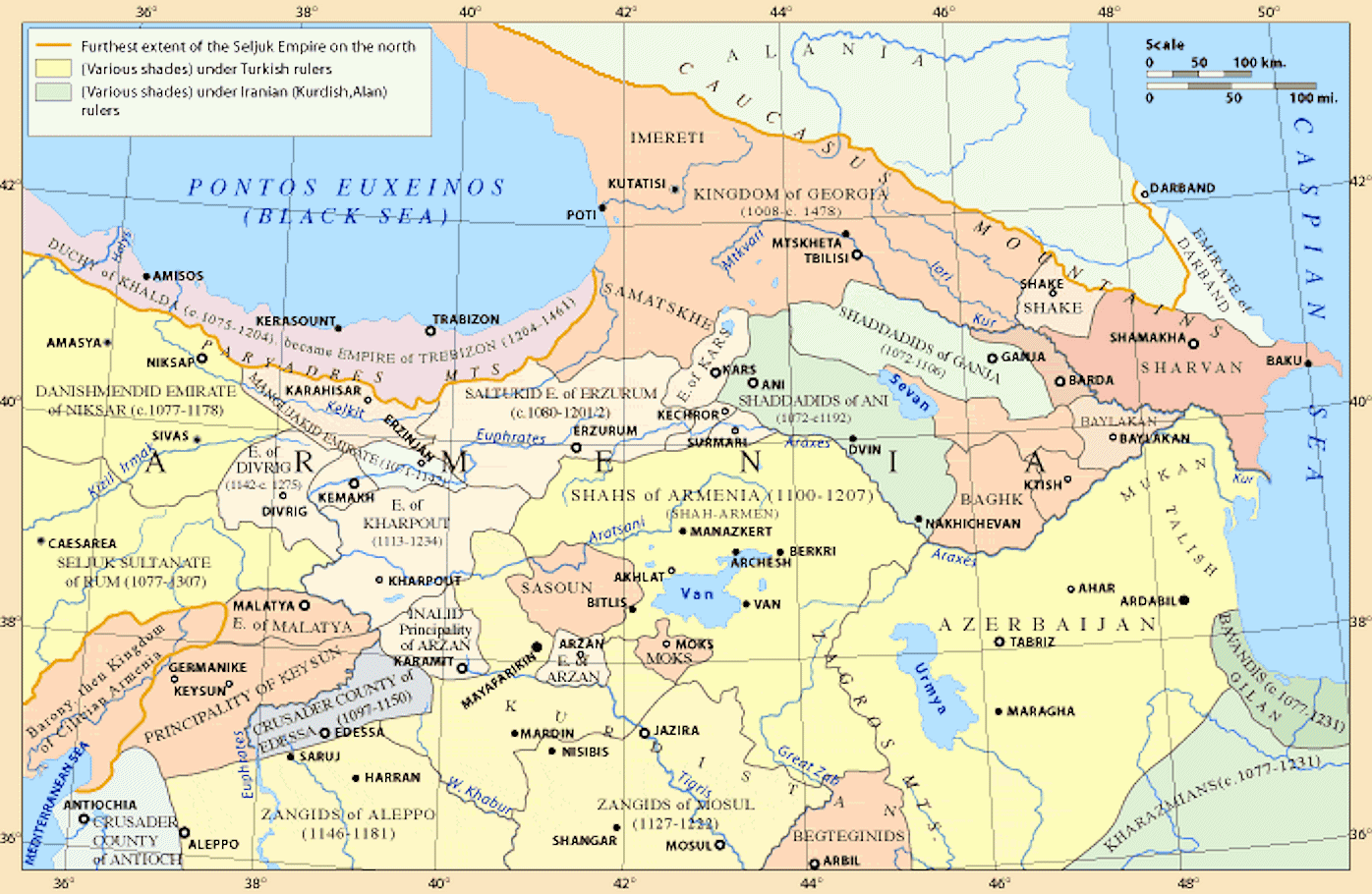
Caucasus region and its southern neighbors during 1072–1174.

The Muslim rulers were jubilant, and they prepared for a new campaign. However, this time they were forestalled by George III, who marched into Arran at the beginning of 1166, occupied a region extending to Ganja, devastated the land and turn back with prisoners and booty. The struggle for Ani continued. For four long years Ani was attacked ceaselessly. The population was reduced to misery, the land was not tilled and the economy was dislocated. There seemed to be no end to the war between George III and atabeg Eldiguz. But the belligerents were exhausted to such an extent that Eldiguz proposed an armistice. George had no alternative but to make concessions. Eldiguz restored Ani to its former rulers, the Shaddadids, who became his vassals.

The Shaddadids, ruled Ani for about 10 years, but in 1174 King George captured the Shahanshah ibn Mahmud as a prisoner and captured Ani once again. Ivane Orbeli, was appointed governor of Ani.

=== Tamar the Great ===
Approximate dates of Georgian control. Mouseover for name.
Blue circle=Capital
Black dot=Georgian held cities and fortresses
Red dot=Conquered cities and fortresses
X=Major battles

The successes of his predecessors were built upon by Queen Tamar, daughter of George III, who became the first female ruler of Georgia in her own right and under whose leadership the Georgian state reached the zenith of power and prestige in the Middle Ages. Tamar was successful in neutralizing this opposition and embarked on an energetic foreign policy aided by the decline of the hostile Seljuq Turks. Relying on a powerful military élite, Tamar was able to build an empire which dominated the Caucasus until its collapse under the Mongol attacks within two decades after Tamar's death.

Once Tamar succeeded in consolidating her power and found a reliable support in David Soslan, the Mkhargrdzeli, Toreli, and other noble families, she revived the expansionist foreign policy of her predecessors. Repeated occasions of dynastic strife in Georgia combined with the efforts of regional successors of the Great Seljuq Empire, such as the Eldiguzids, Shirvanshahs, and the Ahlatshahs, had slowed down the dynamic of the Georgians achieved during the reigns of Tamar's great-grandfather, David IV, and her father, George III. However, the Georgians became again active under Tamar, more prominently in the second decade of her rule.

Early in the 1190s, the Georgian government began to interfere in the affairs of the Eldiguzids and of the Shirvanshahs, aiding rivaling local princes and reducing Shirvan to a tributary state. The Eldiguzid atabeg Abu Bakr attempted to stem the Georgian advance, but suffered a defeat at the hands of David Soslan at the Battle of Shamkor and lost his capital to a Georgian protégé in 1195. Although Abu Bakr was able to resume his reign a year later, the Eldiguzids were only barely able to contain further Georgian forays.

The question of liberation of Armenia remained of prime importance in Georgia's foreign policy. Tamar's armies led by two Armenian generals, Zakare and Ivane Zakarian overran fortresses and cities towards the Ararat Plain, reclaiming one after another fortresses and districts from local Muslim rulers.

The Seljuk Sultanate of Rum in 1190

Alarmed by the Georgian successes, Süleymanshah II, the resurgent Seljuqid sultan of Rûm, rallied his vassal emirs and marched against Georgia, but his camp was attacked and destroyed by David Soslan at the Battle of Basian in 1203 or 1204. The chronicler of Tamar describes how the army was assembled at the rock-hewn town of Vardzia before marching on to Basian and how the queen addressed the troops from the balcony of the church. Exploiting her success in this battle, between 1203 and 1205 Georgians seized the town of Dvin and entered Akhlatshah possessions twice and subdued the emir of Kars (vassal of the Saltukids in Erzurum), Akhlatshahs, the emirs of Erzurum and Erzincan.

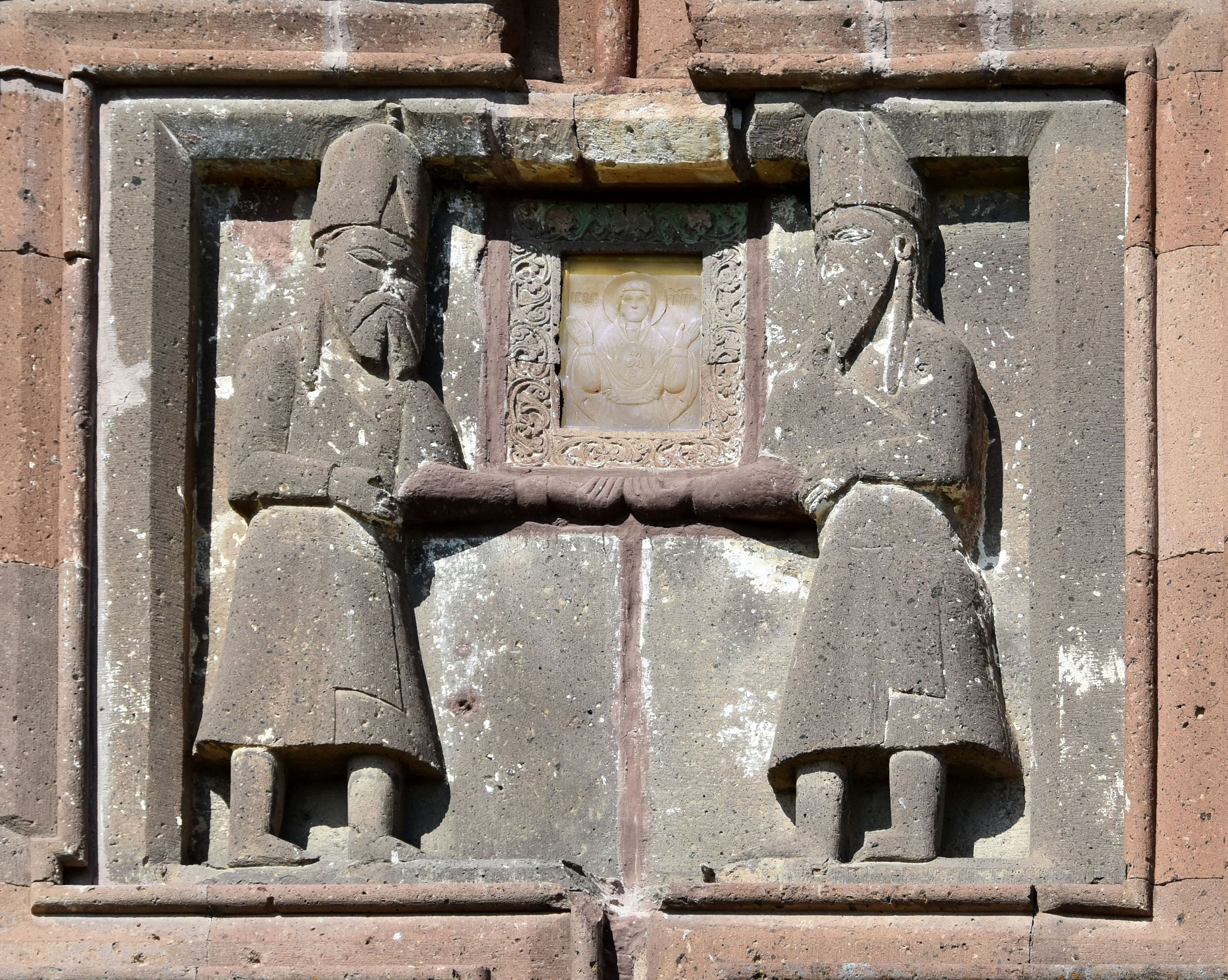
Zakare and Ivane Zakarian on the east facade at Harichavank, Armenia, 1201.

In 1204–1205, the Georgians raided the northern areas of Lake Van, the Archesh and Manzikert. After the death of the last Sokhmenid ruler of Shah-Armen without an heir, a struggle began between the Ayyubids to seize power in the Sultanate. Disturbances at home and external pressure turned out to be the reason for the weakening of Shah-Armens and they were no longer able to deal with the threat from the Georgians. The Muslim rulers of the region, could not adapt to the strengthening of Christian Georgia, and that is why the Sultan of Ahlat called for help from the Emir Toghrulshah of Erzurum. They marched with a common army towards the borders of Georgia. When the Georgians found out about the enemy's intentions, they were overconfident, ignored the danger coming from them and faced the enemy defenseless.

Georgians marched on Ahlat in 1205–1206. However, this attempt also ended in failure, because the purpose of this campaign was not the complete conquest of the Shah-Armens, but its plundering. The two crushing defeats experienced against Shah-Armens had a negative impact on Georgia's international status. The situation needed to be corrected immediately.

Simultaneously with the murder of Balaban, the last ruler of the Shah-Armens, in 1206 the Kingdom of Georgia under the command of Davit Soslan besieged Kars (vassal of the Shah-Armens) and other fortresses along the Aras river. The Emir of Kars appealed to the Sultan of the Shah-Armens for help, but he was powerless to find help. In such a situation, the emir of Kars asked the Georgians for a truce and in return gave up the fortress. Ivane Akhaltsikheli was appointed as the Amirtamira of Kars.

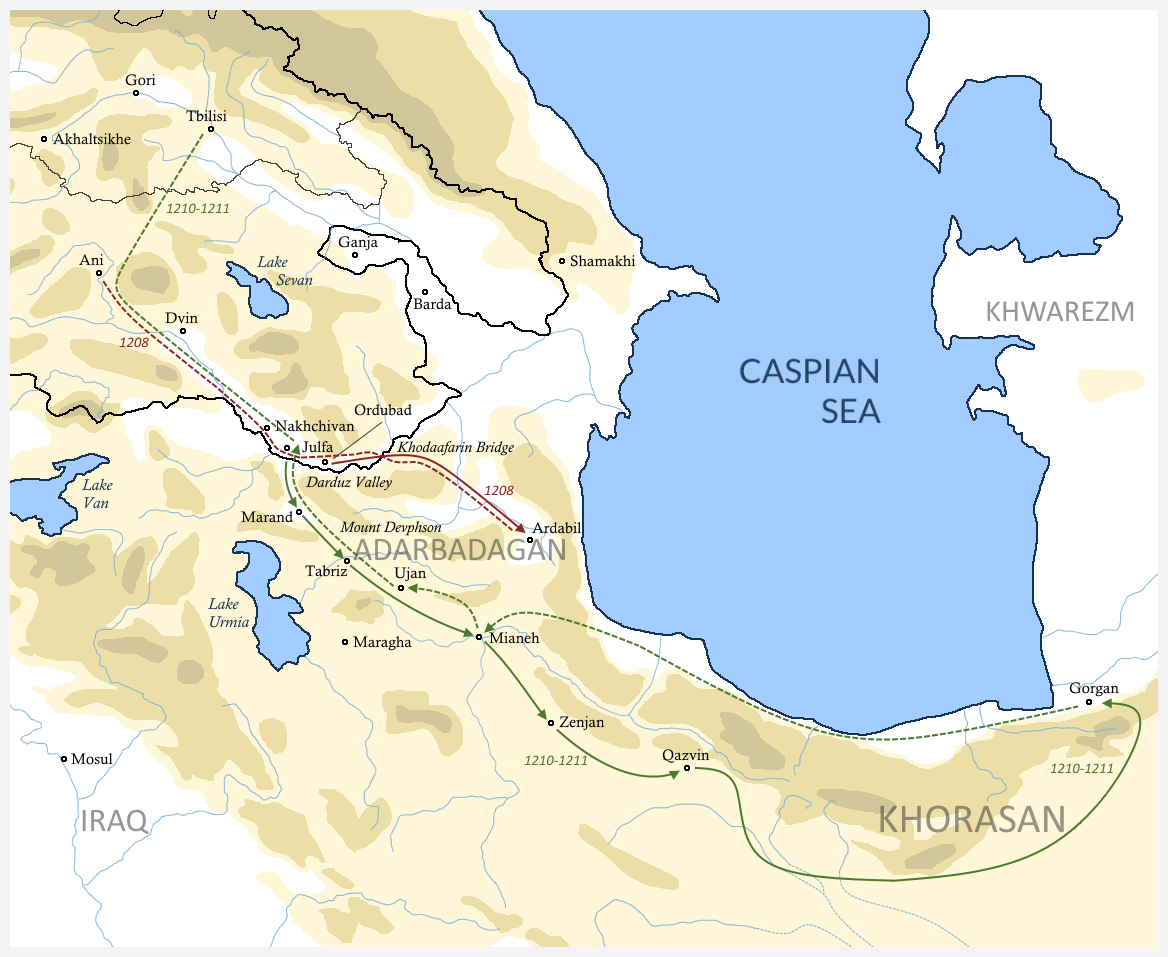
Georgian campaign against the Eldiguzids in 1208 and 1210-1211 years.

In 1210–1211, the Zakarids–Mkhargrdzeli brothers Zakare and Ivane waste to Ardabil – according to the Georgian and Armenian annals – as a revenge for the local Muslim ruler's attack on Ani and his massacre of the city's Christian population. In a great final burst, the brothers led an army marshaled throughout Tamar's possessions and vassal territories in a march, through Nakhchivan and Julfa, to Marand, Tabriz, and Qazvin in northwest Iran, pillaging several settlements on their way.

== Consequences ==
George IV continued Tamar's policy. He put down the revolts in neighbouring Muslim vassal states in the 1210s and began preparations for a large-scale campaign against Jerusalem to support the Crusaders in 1220. However, the Mongols approach to the Georgian borders made the Crusade plan unrealistic. The first Mongol expedition defeated Georgian armies in 1221–1222. George IV died fighting them in 1223 and his sister Rusudan made a desperate alliance against Mongols when she and her daughter Tamar married to Seljuk princes of Erzurum and Sultanate of Rum. The former enemies were now the closest allies (Battle of Köse Dağ) but that did not prevent the Mongol advance.

== See also ==
- Military history of Georgia
- Byzantine–Georgian wars
- Khwarazmian–Georgian wars
