= Ivane II Orbeli =

Georgian noble

Amirspasalar
- In office 1156–1178
- Preceded by: Kirkash Abuletisdze
- Succeeded by: Kubasar

Mandaturtukhutsesi
- In office 1160–1178
- Preceded by: Sumbat I Orbeli
- Succeeded by: Kubasar

Personal details
- Born: Unknown
- Died: 1178
- Spouse: Rusudan
- Children: Sumbat
- Parent: Sumbat I Orbeli

Ivane II Orbeli was a Court official of the Kingdom of Georgia, holding the offices of Amirspasalar (Commander-in-Chief) and Mandaturtukhutsesi (Lord High Mandator).

== Biography ==
According to Vardan Areveltsi the Georgian King David V was poisoned by Sumbat and Ivane Orbeli who had made an agreement with Prince George, that he would appoint them generals. In 1156 Ivane Orbeli was indeed rewarded by George III with the post of Amirspasalar (commander-in-chief).

When King George III captured Ani in 1161 he appointed Ivane as governor. In the same year a Muslim coalition of Shah-Armens, Saltukids and Artuqids suffered a defeat when they tried to recapture Ani from the Georgians.

In 1163 a second coalition was led by atabeg Shams al-Din Ildeniz, Eldigüz who defeated the Georgian king, George III was forced to hand over Ani to Fadl ibn Mahmud's brother Shahanshah ibn Mahmud. The Shaddadids ruled Ani for about 10 years as vassals of the Eldiguzids, but in 1174 George III captured Shahanshah as a prisoner and recaptured Ani once again, reappointed Ivane Orbeli as governor.

== Family ==
Ivane was married to a Rusudan, their children were:

- Sumbat
- A daughter, married to Demna of Georgia.

== Bibliography ==
- Baumer, Christoph (2023). History of the Caucasus. Bloomsbury Publishing. ISBN 9780755636303.
- Eastmond, Antony (1998). Royal Imagery in Medieval Georgia. University Park: Pennsylvania State Press. ISBN 0-271-01628-0.
- Rayfield, Donald (2012). Edge of Empires, a History of Georgia. London: Reaktion Books. ISBN 978-1-78023-070-2.
