= Siege of Ani (1124) =

Battle between the Georgians and the Shaddadids

- Part of the Georgian–Seljuk wars and Georgian–Shaddadid wars
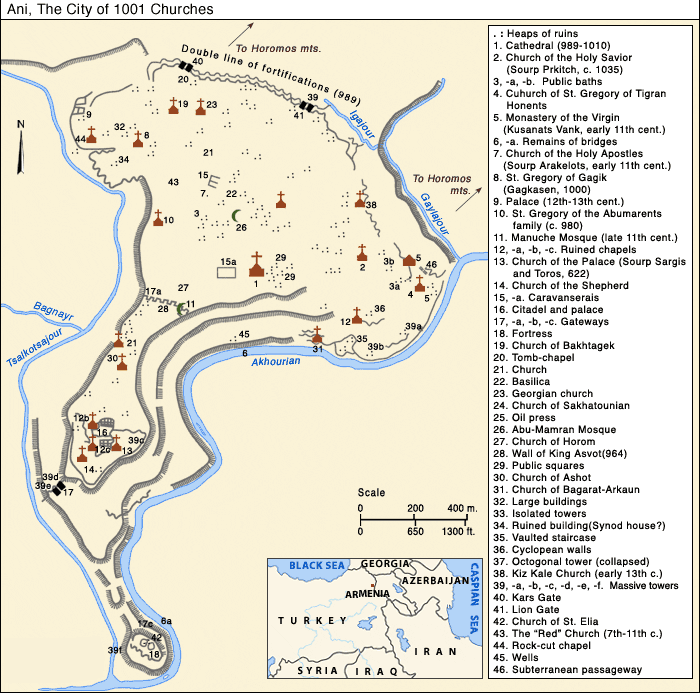
- Plan of Ani
Date	August 1124
Location	Ani, Armenia 40°30′27″N 43°34′22″E
Result	Georgian victory
Territorial changes	Northern Armenia was annexed and incorporated into the Kingdom of Georgia

Belligerents
Kingdom of Georgia	Seljuk Empire; Shaddadids

Commanders and leaders
David IV	Abu'l-Aswar Shavur ibn Manuchihr

Strength
60,000	Unknown

The siege of Ani (Georgian: ანისის ალყა) occurred in August 1124, when the Georgian army, led by King David IV the Builder, successfully liberated the ancient Armenian capital of Ani, and northern Armenia from the control of the Muslim emirs.

== History ==
Ani had been under Muslim control since its capture by Alp Arslan in 1064, and following its sale to the Shaddadids, a forced Islamization of the city took place, causing discontent among the local Christian population.

The city of Ani was an important economic center of the Near East, during this period it was owned by Abu'l-Aswar Shavur ibn Manuchihr, who succeeded his father Manuchihr ibn Shavur in 1118. Abu'l-Aswar was accused by the contemporary Armenian historian Vardan Areveltsi of persecuting Christians and attempting to sell Ani to the Seljuk emir of Kars, he also placed a crescent on the dome of the Cathedral of Ani.

In response, Ani's Armenians appealed to King David IV to capture Ani, taking this opportunity in hand, David IV summoned all his armies and entered Armenia with 60,000 men to take the city. Without a single fight, the Armenian population of Ani opened the gates to the Georgians, who captured emir Abu'l-Aswar Shavur ibn Manuchihr and exiled him and his family to Abkhazia, Samuel Anetsi notes that "not a single soul was harmed by blood". The region was then left to the governance of the Meskhetian nobility, to General Abuleti and his son Ivane.

Armenian families (including many dispossessed nobles) subsequently established themselves in Georgia proper and the royal power built the city of Gori for them. Northern Armenia was thus annexed and incorporated into the Kingdom of Georgia, increasing the power of David IV in the region. Georgia's conquest of Northeast Armenia finally completed the ultimate project of securing South Caucasus against the Turkish threat. For the first time, the entire Caucasus is unified culturally, spiritually and politically under a single scepter, this being Georgia.

King David IV freed the Cathedral of Ani, after which the cathedral returned to Christian usage. Katranide, the queen of the Greeks who built the Cathedral, was buried there. David, together with the Catholicos and the bishops, took care of the deceased and called the tomb three times "Rejoice, you holy queen, for God has saved your throne from the hands of the unrighteous."

== Bibliography ==
- Asatiani, Nodar; Bendianashvili, Alexandre (1997). Histoire de la Géorgie. Paris: L'Harmattan. ISBN 2-7384-6186-7.
- Asatiani, Nodar; Janelidze, Otar (2009). History of Georgia. Tbilisi: Publishing House Petite. ISBN 978-9941-9063-6-7.
- Bedrosian, Robert (1997). "Armenian during the Seljuk and Mongol Periods". In Hovannisian, Richard G. (ed.). The Armenian People From Ancient to Modern Times. Vol. I: The Dynastic Periods: From Antiquity to the Fourteenth Century. St. Martin's Press.
- Hasratyan, Murad (2002). "Անիի Մայր Տաճար (Cathedral of Ani)". In Ayvazyan, Hovhannes (ed.). "Քրիստոնյա Հայաստան" հանրագիտարան ("Christian Armenia" Encyclopedia) (in Armenian). Armenian Encyclopedia Publishing. pp. 63–64.
- Minorsky, Vladimir (1953). Studies in Caucasian History. New York: Taylor’s Foreign Press. ISBN 0-521-05735-3.
- Pubblici, Lorenzo (2022). Mongol Caucasia: Invasions, Conquest, and Government of a Frontier Region in Thirteenth-Century Eurasia (1204-1295). Brill.
- Metreveli, Roin (2011). Saint David the Builder. Tbilisi. ISBN 9789941425509.
- Peacock, Andrew (2011). "Shaddadids". Encyclopædia Iranica.
