= Fadlun ibn Fadl =

Shaddadid emir from 1073 to 1075

Fadlun ibn Fadl, or Fadl III was the last ruler of the Shaddadids of Arran from Ganja. (Note: " The last of the line to reign in Arrān was Fażlun b. Fażl (Fażl III), who usurped the emirate from his father in 1073.") He ruled from 1073 to 1075, until the Seljuk Sultan Malik-Shah removed him from power, giving him Astarabad. The realm was then absorbed by the Great Seljuqs, placing Sav-Tegin as governor of Ganja.

Following the death of Sav-Tegin in 1085, Fadl instigated a revolt and gained possession of Ganja. Malik-Shah launched a campaign in 1086 and removed Fadl from power again. Ebn al-Aṯir mentions a Fadl who died wealthless in 1091, in Baghdad, but it is uncertain whether that was he or his father. A collateral line of Shaddadids, through Manuchihr ibn Shavur, continued to rule in Ani.

== Sources ==
- Bosworth, C.E. (1968). "The Political and Dynastic History of the Iranian World". In Boyle, J.A. (ed.). The Cambridge History of Iran. Vol. 5:The Saljuq and Mongol Period. Cambridge University Press.
- Peacock, Andrew (2011). "Shaddadids". Encyclopaedia Iranica.
