= Najm al-Din Alpi =

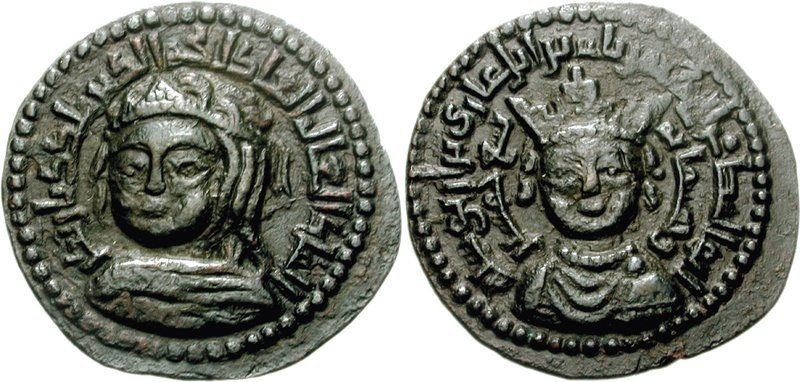
Coinage of Najm al-Din Alpi (r.1152-1176). Dated AH 559 (1164-5 CE).

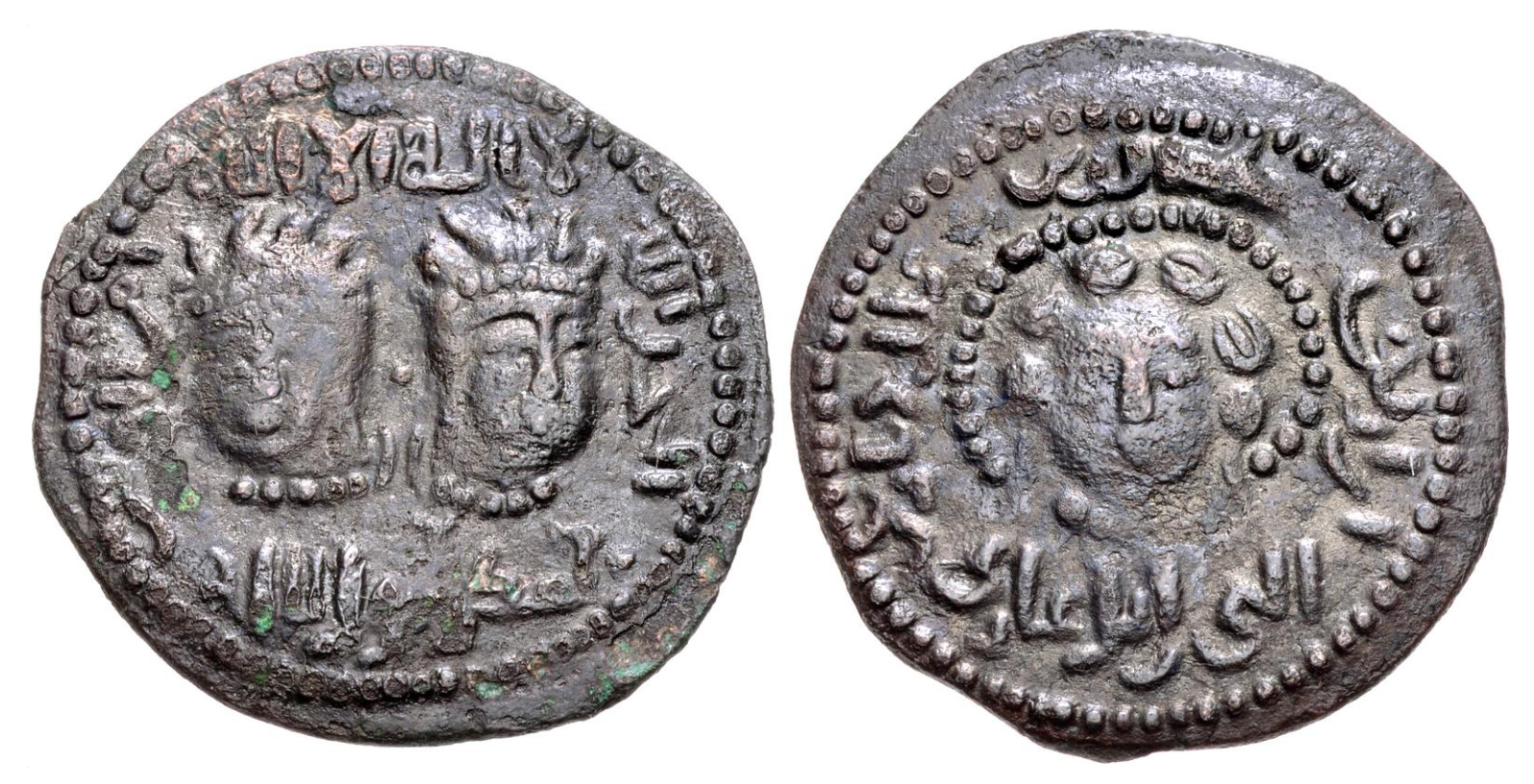
Dirham of artuqid Najm al-Din Alpi, maybe minted in Mardin, with al-Mustanjid's name

Najm al-Din Alpi (Turkish: Necmeddin Alpı; r.1152–1176) was the Turkish Artuqid ruler of Mardin and Mayyafariqin, and son of Timurtash.

Throughout his rule, Alpi solidified alliances with neighboring leaders through joint military campaigns. For instance, he collaborated with Kara Arslan in assaulting Yakup Arslan's territory, encompassing Harput and Malatya, while also supporting Nur ad-Din Zangi during the Battle of Harim. Furthermore, he allied with Shāh-i Arman of Ahlat, Sökmen II, to confront Georgia during the siege of Ani in 1161.

Alpi's reign concluded in 1176, upon which his son Qutb al-Din Il-Ghazi assumed leadership.

== Sources ==
- Richards, D.S. (2020). The Chronicle of Ibn Al-Athir for the Crusading Period from Al-Kamil Fi'l-Ta'rikh. Part 2. Taylor & Francis. ISBN 9781351892841.
