= Marushian Vardanisdze =

Marushian Vardanisdze (Georgian: მარუშიან ვარდანისძე) was a Georgian noble (didebuli) from eastern Georgia in 12th century.

Following the death of George III, Queen Tamar appointed Marushian to the office of chukhcharkh, because the father of Marushian became old, she honored his son with the position to have seat at royal court. chukhcharkh is an official of a high rank. He was in charge of the Queen's administrative office and at the same time he was the Queen's personal chief armourer.
