= Sultan ibn Mahmud =

Shaddadid emir of Ani from 1174 to 1199

Sultan ibn Mahmud was the last known Shaddadid emir of Ani reigning in parts of the dynasty's possessions from at least 1174 to c. 1199. He is known exclusively from the epigraphic data.

At the time of Sultan and his immediate predecessors, Ani became a target of expansionism of the kings of Georgia. Sultan's rule in parts of his dynasty's dwindling possessions, in the lands across the Araxes, is documented by an inscription dated to Safar 570 (September 1174) in the Dashtadem castle in modern Armenia. Another inscription, that from Ani, dated to 595 AH (1198/1199CE), indicates that he had revived the Shaddadid rule in Ani. Vladimir Minorsky identified him with Shahanshah ibn Mahmud, known from the literary sources. Sultan's inscription from Ani is the last the Shaddadis are heard of. By 1200, Ani had been invaded by the armies of Queen Tamar of Georgia, who granted the city in possession to her loyal subject of the Armenian Zakarian family.
