= Fadl ibn Shavur ibn Manuchihr =

Shaddadid emir of Ani from c. 1125 to 1130

Fadl ibn Shavur ibn Manuchihr was Shaddadid emir of Ani from c. 1125 to 1130. Fadl was the son of deposed emir Abu'l-Aswar Shavur. Fadl retook Ani from the Georgians, but promised to observe the rights of its Christian population. Fadl extended his rule to Dvin and Ganja, but failed to maintain these cities. He was murdered by his courtiers following the fall of Dvin to the Turkish emir Qurti c. 1130. His brothers, Mahmud ibn Shavur and Khushchikr, ruled briefly in quick succession until the emirate was taken over by Fadl's nephew, Fakr al-Din Shaddad b. Mahmud.

== Sources ==
- Peacock, Andrew (2011). "Shaddadids". Encyclopædia Iranica.
