= Saltuk II =

Anatolian bey

İzzettin Saltuk
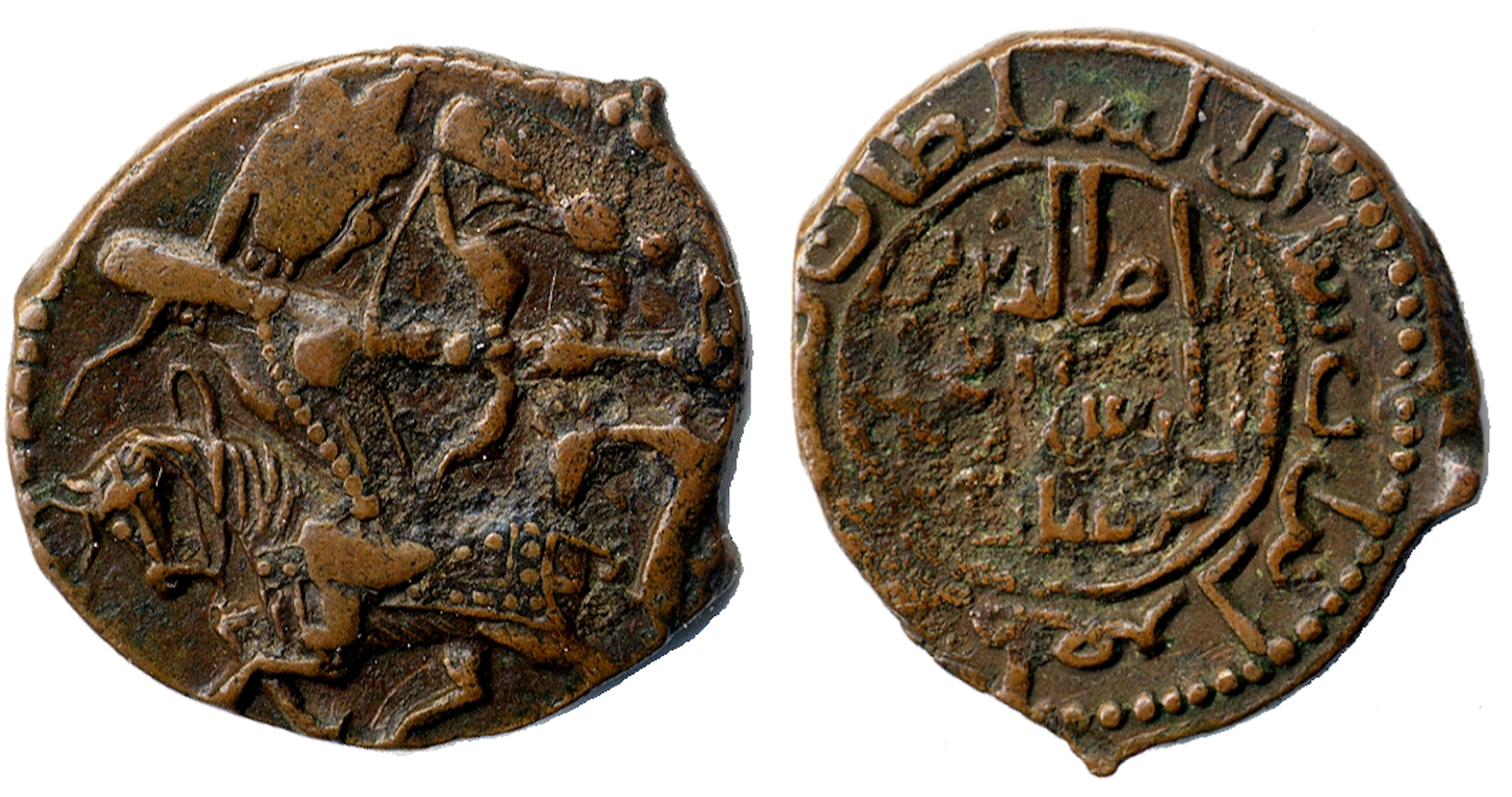
- Salduq b. `Ali under the authority of Tughril Beg, Rukh al-Din Abu Talib. Erzurum, 540-70 H (1146-1176 CE).

Bey of Saltukids
- In office 1132–1168

Personal details
- Born: unknown
- Died: April 1168

Military service
- Allegiance: Seljuq Empire
- Battles/wars: Battle against the Georgians

Saltuk II (İzzettin Saltuk) was a bey of Saltukids in the 12th century.

== Background ==
After Alp Arslan of Seljukids defeated the Byzantine army in the battle of Manzikert in 1071, a series of Turkmen beyliks (kingdoms) were formed in Anatolia before Anatolia was united by the Sultanate of Rum. Saltukids was one of them. Its capital was Erzurum. Saltuk II was the fourth Sultan of this Saltukids.

== Plot ==
Saltuk became the bey after the death of his uncle Ziyaeddin in 1132. He formed family relations with the other Turkmen beyliks around Erzurum. However, when Fakr al-Din Shaddad, a Shaddadid emir of Ani asked for Saltuk's daughter's hand Saltuk refused him. This caused a deep hatred in Şeddat towards Saltuk. In 1154 he planned a plot and formed a secret alliance with the Demetrius I of Georgia. While a Georgian army waited in ambush, he invited Saltuk to Ani with the pretext of selling the fort to Saltukids. Saltuk was taken prisoner by the Georgians. After ransom was paid by Saltuk's sons-in-law and Saltuk swore not to fight against the Georgians, he returned home.

== Ani campaign ==
Towards the end of Saltuk's reign in 1161, George III of Georgia captured Ani. Turkmen beys formed a coalition to recapture Ani. Saltuk was a part of this coalition. But during the siege, Georgian army arrived to defend the fort and Saltuk remembering his oath, left the battle field. The campaign was a failure. However, two years later, Georgians were defeated by a coalition of Muslim leaders and Saltuk was able to expand his territory.

== Death ==
Saltuk died in 1168. He was succeeded by his son Nasiruddin Muhammed. Next ruler after Nasiruddin was Mama Hatun (a female ruler, a rare example in an Islamic land) who was Saltuk’s daughter. His other daughter, Shahbanu, married Sökmen II, ruler of Ahlatshahs.
