= Tedzami =

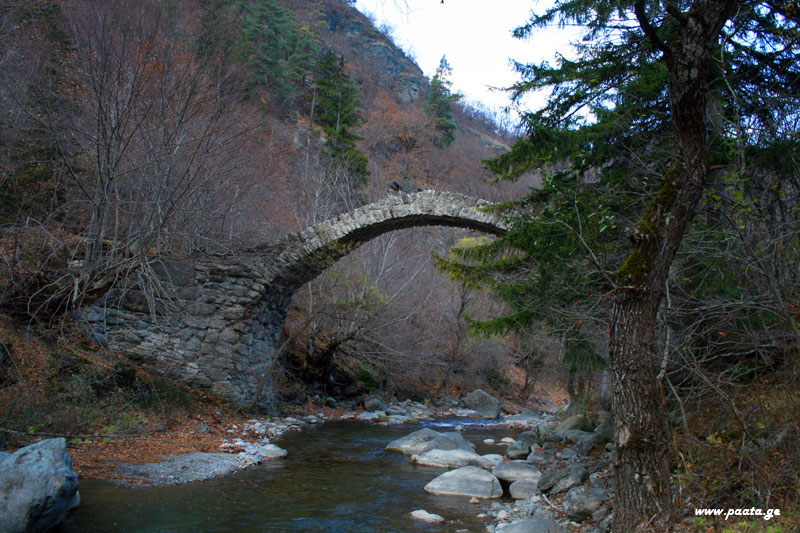
- "Queen Tamar's Bridge" in Rkoni
- Native name: თეძამი (Georgian)

Location
- Country: Georgia

Physical characteristics
- Mouth: Kura
  - coordinates: 41.9401°N 44.3114°E
- Length: 51 km (32 mi)
- Basin size: 404 km^{2} (156 sq mi)

Basin features
- Progression: Kura→ Caspian Sea

The Tedzami (Georgian: თეძამი) is a river of Georgia. It is 51 km (32 mi) long, and has a drainage basin of 404 km^{2} (156 sq mi). It is a right tributary of the Kura (Mtkvari), which it joins west of the town Kaspi.
