= Non-Muslim Provinces under Early Islam =

Book by Alison Vacca

Non-Muslim Provinces under Early Islam: Islamic Rule and Iranian Legitimacy in Armenia and Caucasian Albania
- Author: Alison Vacca
- Published: 2017 (Cambridge University Press)

Non-Muslim Provinces under Early Islam: Islamic Rule and Iranian Legitimacy in Armenia and Caucasian Albania is a book by Alison Vacca about medieval Armenia and Caucasian Albania. The book deals with the change from Sasanian rule to caliphal rule within these two predominantly Christian polities who were part of the Iranian cultural sphere. The book focusses on the history of Armenia and Caucasian Albania under the Islamic Caliphate, elements of administrative continuity between Sasanian and caliphal rule, and changes in administration by the Marwanids and early Abbasids in relation to these two provinces. Additionally, according to the book description: "Vacca examines historical narrative and the construction of a Sasanian cultural memory during the late ninth and tenth centuries to place the provinces into a broader context of Iranian rule". The book is considered to be within the scope of Islamic, Iranian and Caucasus studies, in addition to being of interest for those studying Iranian identity and Muslim-Christian relations within Western Asia.
