= Shaddadids =

951–1199 Kurdish Muslim dynasty in Armenia and Azerbaijan

- 951–1199
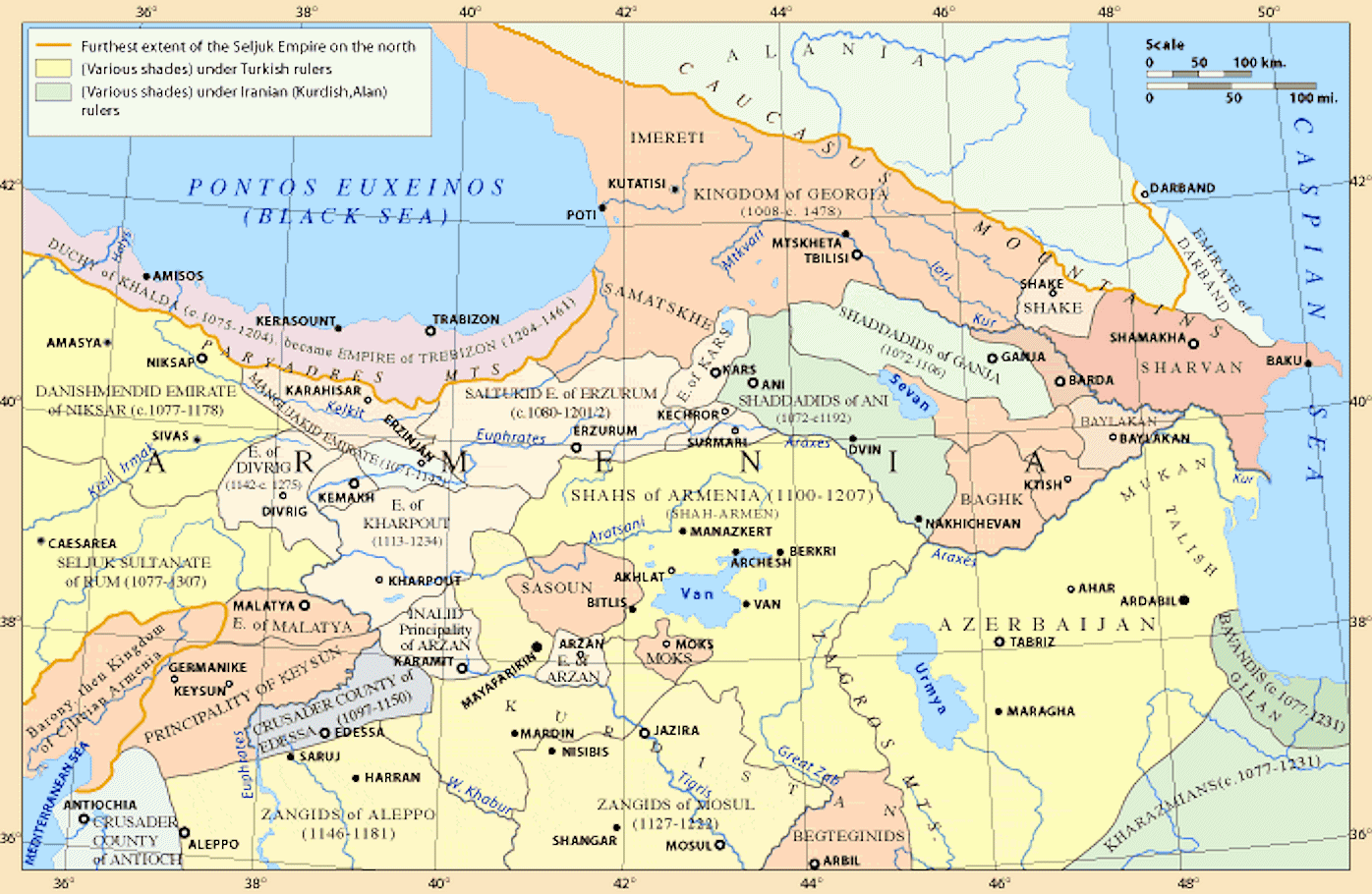
- Map of the Shaddadids ( , ), 11th-12th centuries CE
- Capital: Dvin, Janza, Ani
- Common languages: Persian (court, poetry)
- Other languages: Kurdish
- Religion: Sunni Islam
- Government: Emirate
- Historical era: Middle Ages
  - Established: 951
  - Muhammad ibn Shaddad conquers Dwin: 951
  - Lashkari ibn Muhammad established himself in Ganja: 971
  - Manuchihr ibn Shavur founded the Shaddadis emirate of Ani: c. 1072
  - Disestablished: 1199
Preceded by	Succeeded by
Sallarid dynasty; Byzantine Empire	Seljuk Empire; Kingdom of Georgia

The Shaddadids were a Sunni Muslim dynasty of Kurdish origin. who ruled in various parts of Armenia and Arran from 951 to 1199 AD. They were established in Dvin. Through their long tenure in Armenia, they often intermarried with the Bagratuni royal family of Armenia. (Note: "However, alongside Iranian traditions, the influence of the Shaddadids’ Armenian neighbors and relatives was strong, hence the appearance of typically Armenian names such as Ašoṭ among members of the dynasty. Indeed, Qaṭrān even underlines the dynasty’s Armenian ancestry, calling Fażlun “the glory of the Bagratid family” (Kasravi, p. 261).") (Note: "After the capture of Ani the following year, this old Bagratid capital was ruled by a Muslim dynasty, the Shaddädids. Although of Kurdish origin, they intermarried with Armenians. The first emir of Ani, Manüchihr, for example, was the son of an Armenian princess, and himself married an Armenian.")

They began ruling in the city of Dvin, and eventually ruled other major cities, such as Barda and Ganja. A cadet line of the Shaddadids were given the cities of Ani and Tbilisi as a reward for their service to the Seljuqs, to whom they became vassals. From 1047 to 1057, the Shaddadids were engaged in several wars against the Byzantine army. The area between the rivers Kura and Aras was ruled by a Shaddadid dynasty.

== Origins ==
The Shaddadids were of Kurdish origin, hailing from the Hadhabani Tribe. The historian Andrew Peacock notes that the Shaddadids "aspired to a more illustrious origin than that of Kurdish tribesmen". Some members of the Shaddadid family, such as Manuchihr, Anushirvan, Gudarz and Ardashir, were named after the Sasanian shahanshahs of pre-Islamic Iran (224-651 AD), and the dynasty claimed descent from the Sasanians as well. The notion of claiming links with the pre-Islamic Iranian past as they "sought to legitimize themselves as heirs to pre-Islamic Iranian traditions" was a feature which the Shaddadids shared with numerous other contemporaneous dynasties. In addition to Iranian influences, there were strong Armenian influences among the Shaddadid ruling house, which is attested in members of the family bearing Armenian names such as Ashot.

== History ==
=== Shaddadids of Dvin and Ganja ===
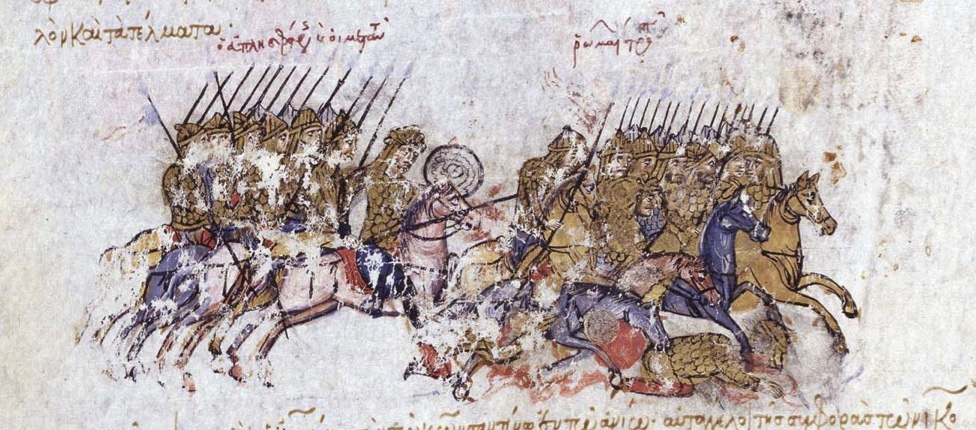
The Byzantines are lured into a trap and defeated by Aplesphares (Abu'l-Aswar, the Kurdish emir of Dvin. 13th-century

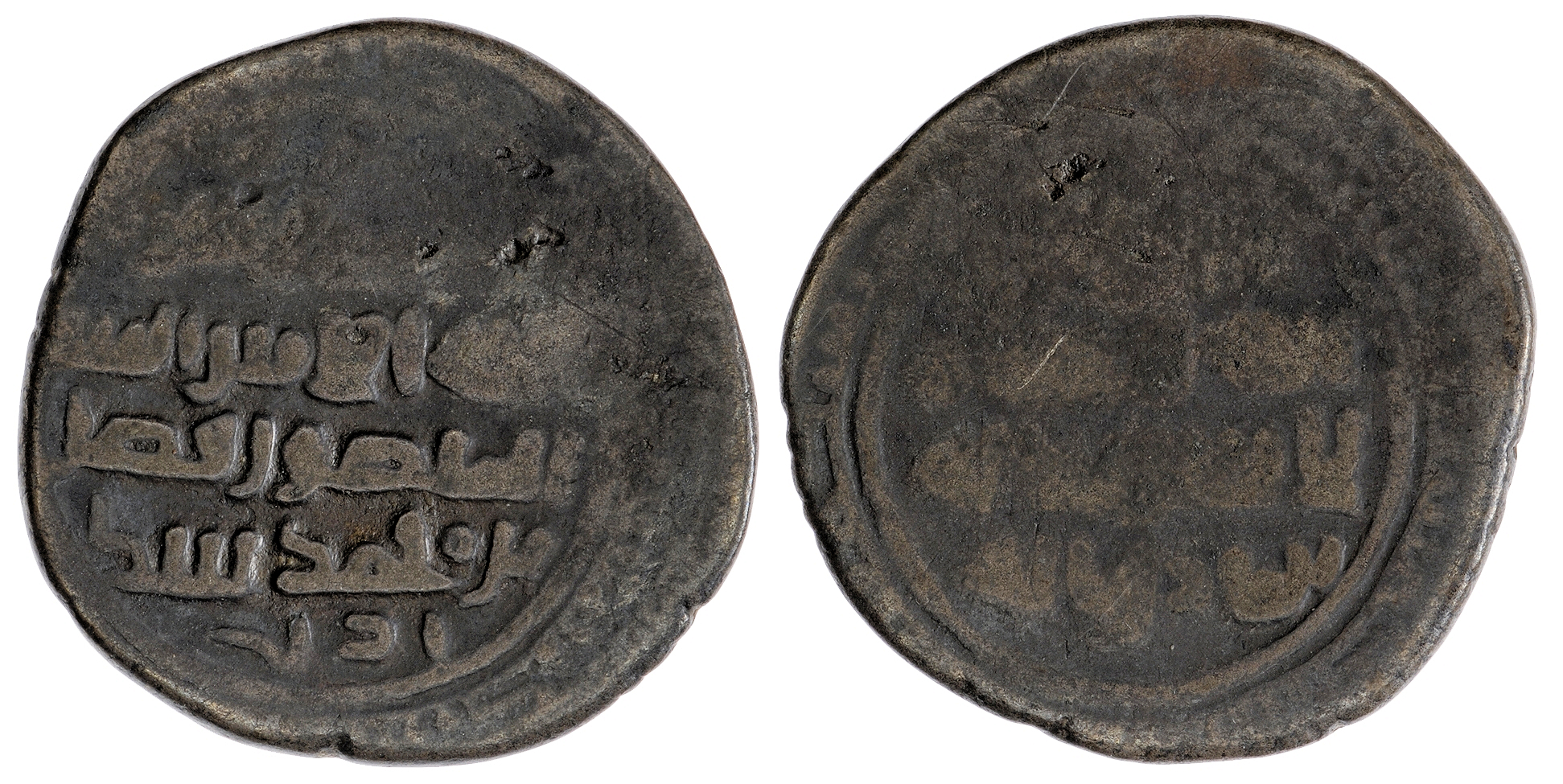
Coinage of Fadl b. Muhammad Shaddadi, Janza (985-1031 CE).

In 951, Muhammad established himself at Dvin. Unable to hold Dvin against Musafirid incursion, he fled to the Armenian Kingdom of Vaspurakan. His son, Lashkari I, ended Musafirid influence in Arran by taking Ganja in 971. He later expanded into Transcaucasia as far north as Shamkir and as far east as Barda (present-day Azerbaijan). The reign of his brother, Marzuban, also lasted only a few years.

Muhammad's third son, Fadl I, expanded his territory during his lengthy reign. He took Dvin from Armenian Bagratids in 1022, and his campaigns against them met with varying degrees of success. He also raided the Khazars in 1030, while holding parts of Arran (present-day Azerbaijan). Later that year, while returning from a successful campaign in Georgia, his army encountered Georgian and Armenian forces and was decisively defeated. Following Fadl I's defeat, the entire region became chaotic, with the Byzantine Empire pressuring Armenian princes and the Seljuk Turks gaining influence over Arran after a resurgent attack by the Seljuks on Dvin.

Abu'l-Fath Musa succeeded Fadl I in 1031, and reigned until his murder by his son and successor Lashkari II in 1034. The poet Qatran Tabrizi praised Lashkari II for his victory over Armenian and Georgian princes during his stay in Ganja. Lashkari II ruled Arran for fifteen years in what is described by the Ottoman historian Münejjim Bashi as a troubled reign. When he died in 1049, Anushirvan succeeded him, but he was still underage, and real power lay with the chamberlain (hajib) Abu Mansur, who served as regent.

The new regime was quickly opposed by a large faction among the populace. Münejjim Bashi, summarizing a now lost local chronicle, reports that this was because Abu Mansur immediately agreed to surrender several frontier fortresses to the Kakhetians, the Georgians and Byzantines, in order "to restrain their greed for Arran". This decision provoked the leading men to revolt under the leadership of al-Haytham, chief of the tanners in Shamkor. According to Vladimir Minorsky, this movement represented an uprising of the town notables against the senior bureaucratic caste. Abu Mansur, then residing at Shamkor, attempted to arrest al-Haytham, but al-Haytham and his ghilman (servants) "drew their daggers" and declared for Anushirvan's great-uncle Abu'l-Aswar Shavur, ruler of Dvin.

Abu'l-Aswar occupied Shamkor, settled the troubled situation there, and went on to take up his residence in the capital, Ganja. He arrested Anushirvan, whose reign ended abruptly after two months, as well as Abu Mansur and his relations. Abu'l-Aswar's long reign (c.1049–67) would prove to be the zenith of the Shaddadids. He was the last independent ruling Shaddadid emir, when Tughril I arrived at Ganja and demanded his vassalage.

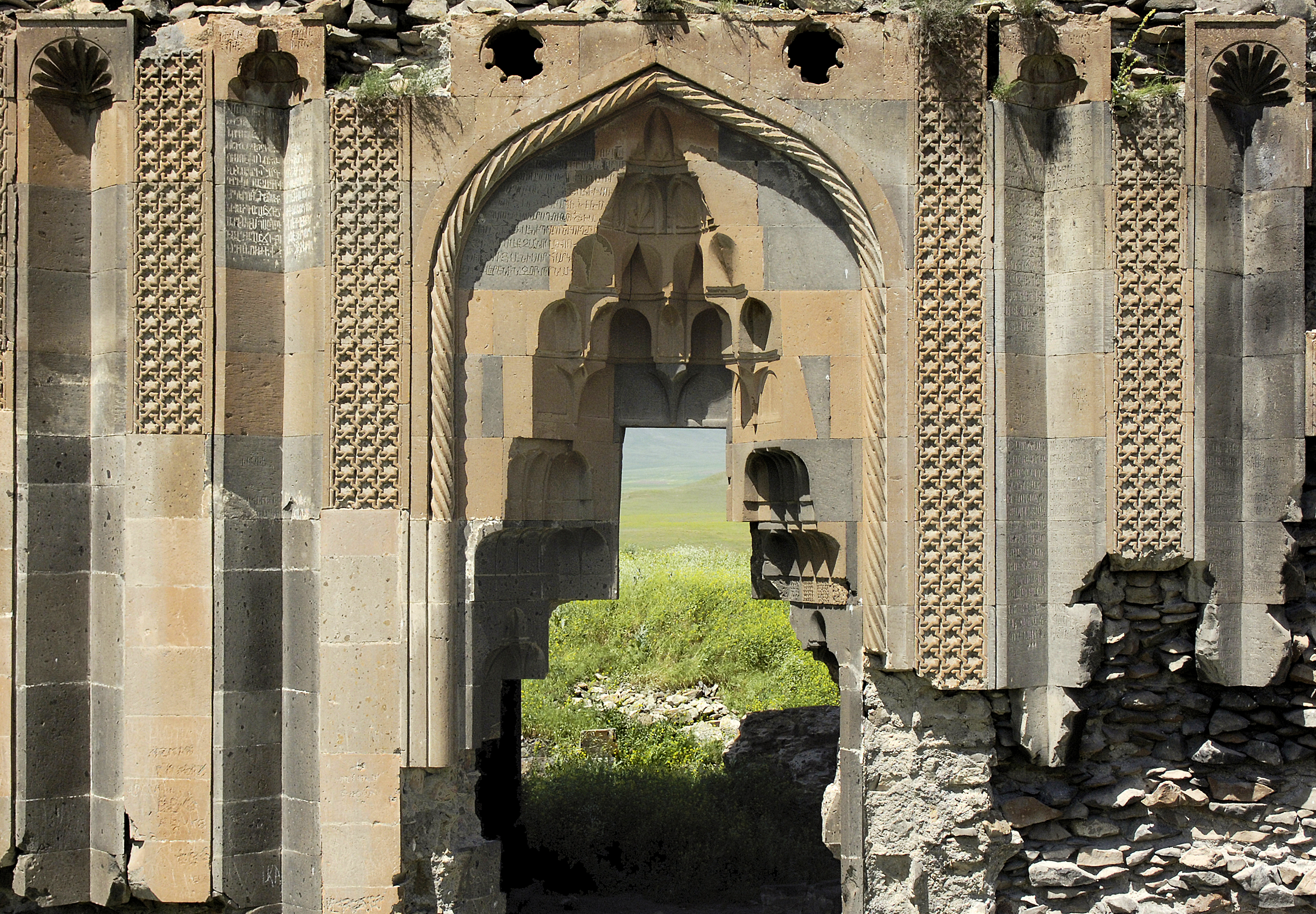
"Church of the Holy Apostles" at Ani, built around the time of the Shaddadids.

On July, 1068 Abu'l-Aswar Shavur's son, Fadl II invaded Georgia with 33,000 men and ravaged its countryside. Bagrat IV of Georgia defeated him and forced the Shaddadid troops to flight. On the road through Kakheti, Fadl was taken prisoner by the local ruler Aghsartan. At the price of conceding several fortresses on the Iori River, Bagrat ransomed Fadl and received from him the surrender of Tbilisi where he reinstated a local emir on the terms of vassalage.

During the captivity of Al-Fadl II, his older brother Ashot ruled Arran for eight months (August 1068 – April 1069), even minting coins in his own name and that of his overlord, the Seljuk Sultan Alp Arslan. In 1075 Alp Arslan annexed the last of the Shaddadid territories. A cadet branch of Shaddadids continued to rule in Ani and Tbilisi as vassals of the Seljuq Empire until 1175, when Malik-Shah I deposed Fadl III.

In 1085, Fadl III instigated a revolt and gained possession of Ganja. Malik-Shah launched a campaign in 1086 and removed Fadl from power again. A collateral line of Shaddadids, through Manuchihr, continued to rule in Ani.

The historian Andrew Peacock notes that the Shaddadids "aspired to a more illustrious origin than that of Kurdish tribesmen". Some members of the Shaddadid family, such as Manuchihr, Anushirvan, Gudarz and Ardashir, were named after the Sasanian shahanshahs of pre-Islamic Iran (224-651 AD), and the dynasty claimed descent from the Sasanians as well. (Note: "The Shaddādids named their children after Sasanian shāhanshāhs and even claimed descent from the Sasanian line.") The notion of claiming links with the pre-Islamic Iranian past as they "sought to legitimize themselves as heirs to pre-Islamic Iranian traditions" was a feature which the Shaddadids shared with numerous other contemporaneous dynasties. In addition to Iranian influences, there were strong Armenian influences among the Shaddadid ruling house, which is attested in members of the family bearing Armenian names such as Ashot.

=== Shaddadids of Ani ===
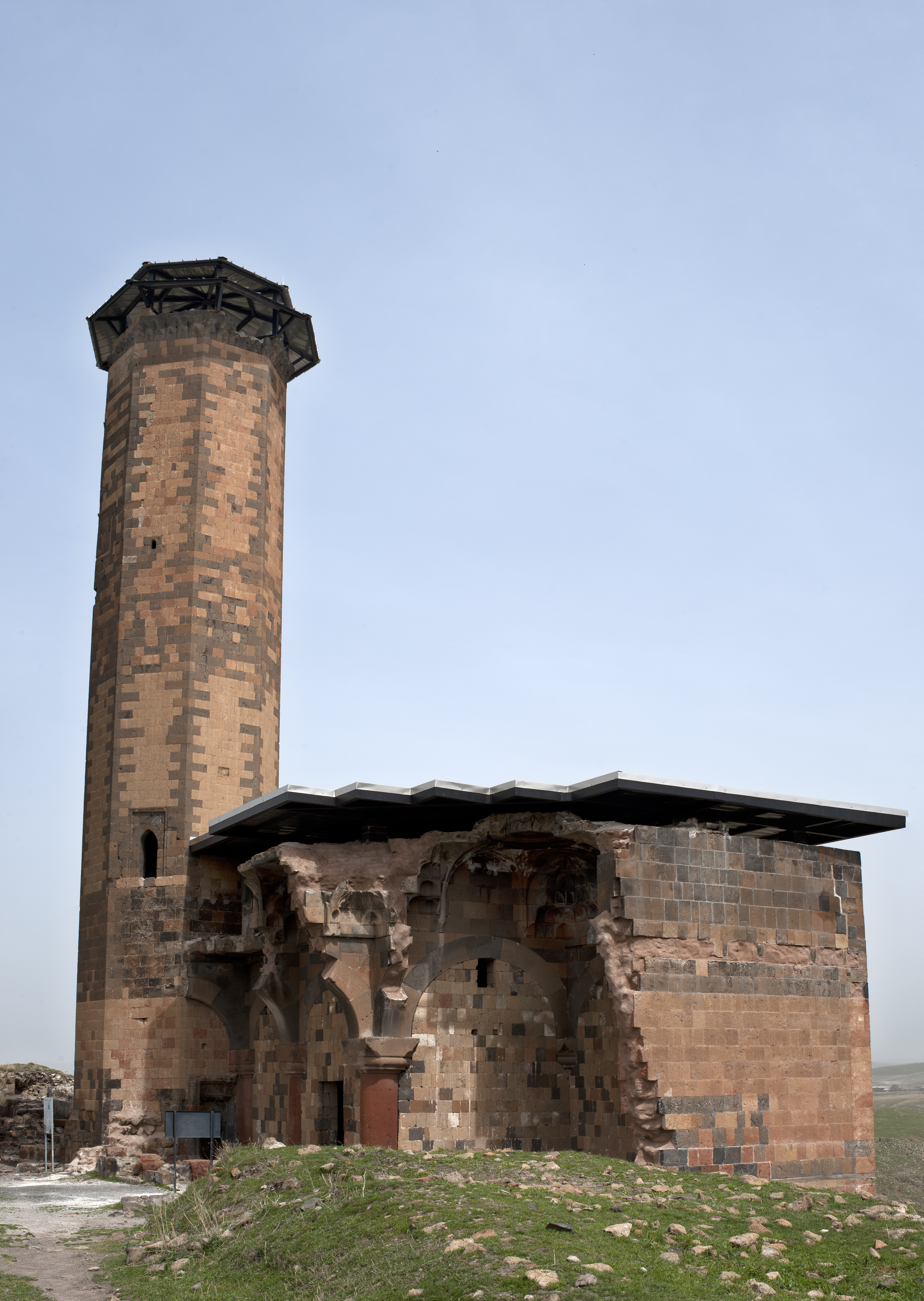
The ruins of Manuchihr Mosque, an 11th-century Shaddadid mosque built among the ruins of Ani.

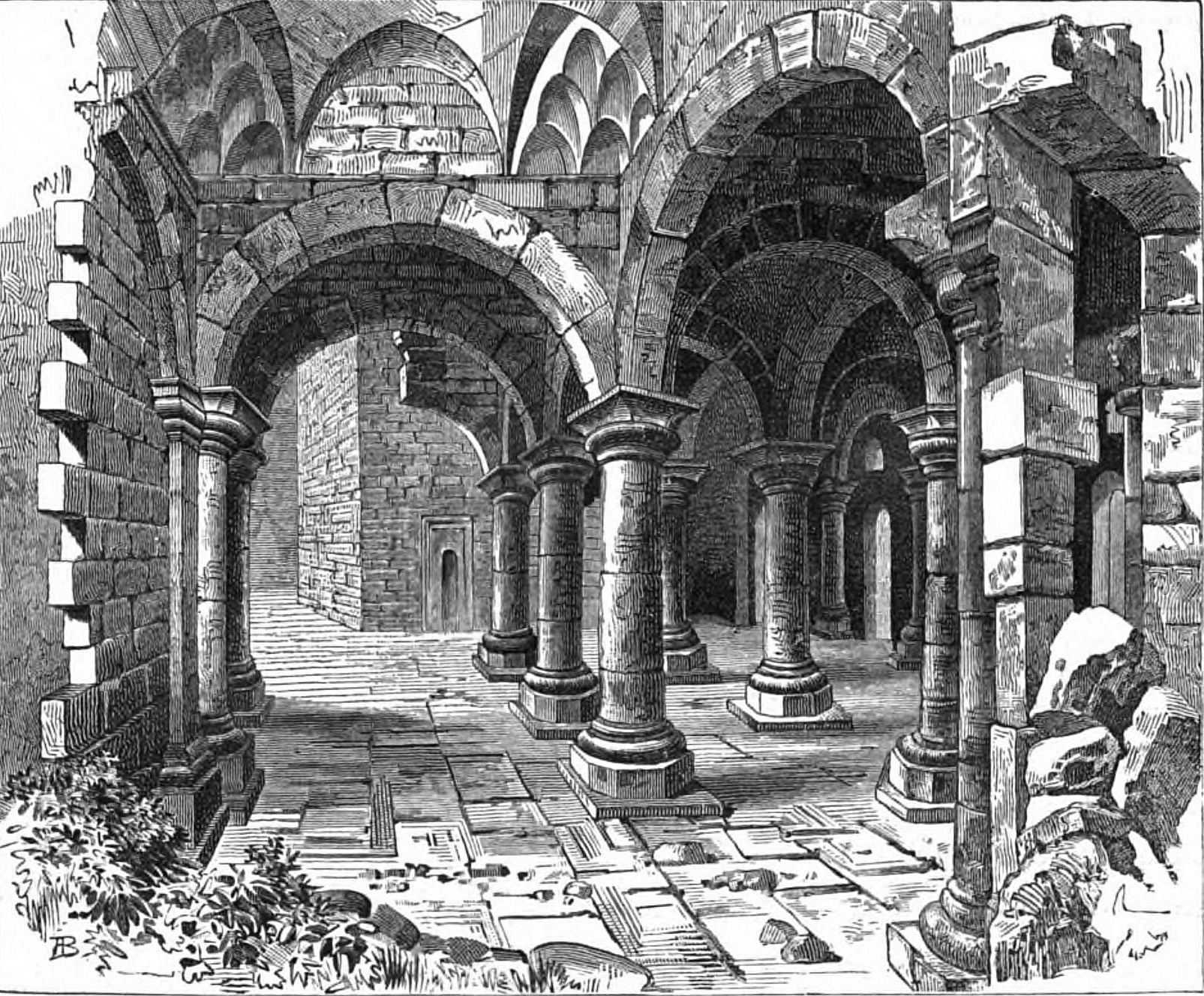
Inside view of Manuchihr Mosque, 1881.

In 1072, the Seljuks sold Ani to the Shaddadid emir of Manuchihr. Manuchihr repaired and enlarged the walls of Ani. The Shaddadids generally pursued a conciliatory policy towards the city's overwhelmingly Armenian and Christian population and actually married several members of the Bagratid nobility.

A son and successor of Manuchihr, Abu'l-Aswar was accused by the contemporary Armenian historian Vardan Areveltsi of persecuting Christians and attempting to sell Ani to the emir of Kars. His rule was terminated by the resurgent King David IV of Georgia, whom Ani surrendered without a fight in 1124. Abu'l-Aswar Shavur ended his days as a captive of the Georgians, while Ani was given by David IV to his general, Abuleti. Abu'l-Aswar Shavur's son Fadl IV would be able to resume the Shaddadid reign in Ani in 1125.

In 1130 Georgia was attacked by the Sultan of Ahlat, Shah-Armen Sökmen II (c.1128-1183). This war was started by the passage of Ani into the hands of the Georgians; Demetrius I had to compromise and give up Ani to Fadl IV on terms of vassalage and inviolability of the Christian churches. Fadl extended his rule to Dvin and Ganja, but failed to maintain these cities. He was murdered by his courtiers following the fall of Dvin to the Turkish emir Qurti c. 1030. His brothers, Mahmud and Khushchikr, ruled briefly in quick succession until the emirate was taken over by Fadl's nephew, Fakr al-Din Shaddad.

In 1139, Demetrius raided the city of Ganja in Arran. He brought the iron gate of the defeated city to Georgia and donated it to Gelati Monastery at Kutaisi. Despite this brilliant victory, Demetrius could hold Ganja only for a few years. In reply to this, the sultan of Eldiguzids attacked Ganja several times, and in 1143 the town again fell to the sultan who appointed his own emir to rule it.

Fakr al-Din Shaddad asked for Saltuk II's daughter's hand, however Saltuk refused him. This caused a deep hatred in Shaddad towards Saltuk. In 1154 he planned a plot and formed a secret alliance with the Demetrius I. While a Georgian army waited in ambush, he offered tribute to Saltukids, ruler of Erzerum and asked the latter to accept him as a vassal. In 1153-1154 Emir Saltuk II marched on Ani, but Shaddad informed his suzerain, the King of Georgia, of this. Demetrius marched to Ani, defeated and captured the emir. At the request of neighbouring Muslim rulers and released him for a ransom of 100,000 dinars, paid by Saltuk's sons in law and Saltuk swore not to fight against the Georgians he returned home.

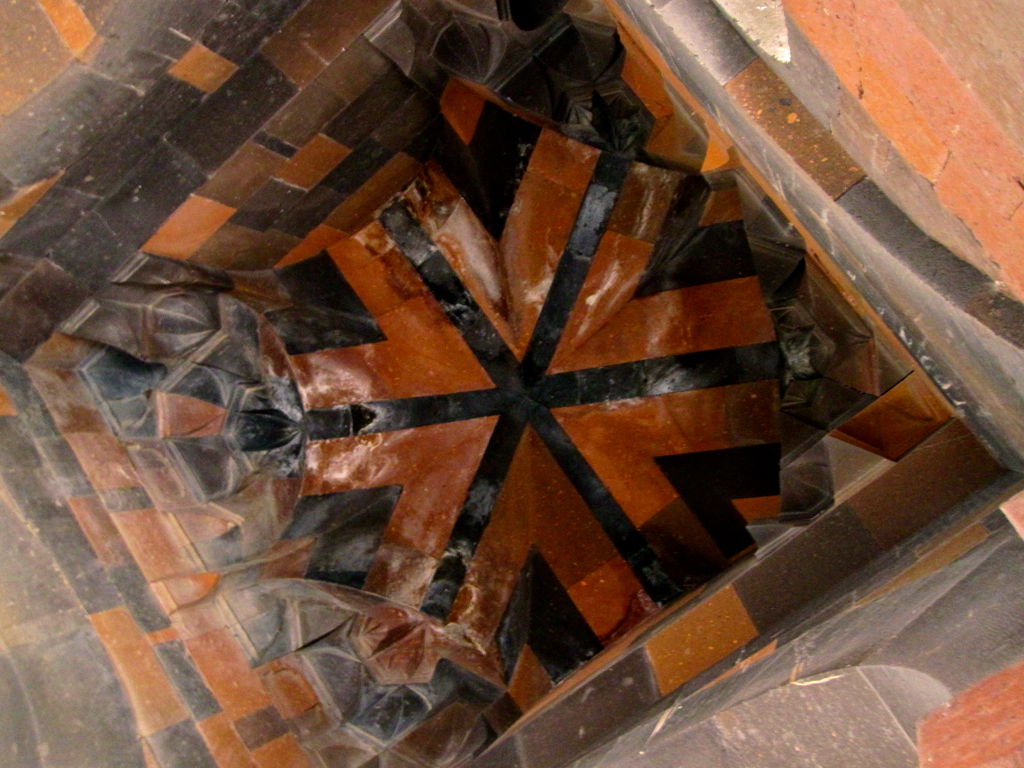
Interior ceiling of the Manuchihr Mosque

In 1156 the Christian population of Ani rose against the emir Fakr al-Din Shaddad, and turned the town over to his brother Fadl V. But Fadl, too, apparently could not satisfy the people of Ani, and this time the town was offered to the George III of Georgia, who took advantage of this offer and subjugated Ani, appointing his general Ivane Orbeli as its ruler in 1161. A coalition of Muslim rulers led by Shams al-Din Eldiguz, ruler of Adarbadagan and some other regions, embarked upon a campaign against Georgia in early 1163. He was joined by the Shah-Armen Sökmen II, Ak-Sunkur, ruler of Maragha, and others. With an army of 50,000 troops they marched on Georgia. The Georgian army was defeated. George had no choice but to make peace.

Eldiguz, a resurgent atabeg of Azerbaijan handed the city over to Shahanshah on terms of vassalage. The Shaddadids, ruled the town for about 10 years, but in 1174 King George took the Shahanshah as a prisoner and occupied Ani once again. Ivane Orbeli, was appointed governor of the town. In 1175 the southern provinces of Georgia were again overrun by a united Muslim host. This marked the beginning of another long struggle for Ani. The chronicles do not allow the reconstruction of any coherent picture of this struggle, but we can assume that the town and region frequently changed hands. The Georgians captured Ani four times; 1124, 1161, 1174 and 1199. The first three times, it was recaptured by the Shaddadids. In the year 1199, Georgia's Queen Tamar captured Ani, she granted the city to the Armeno–Georgian Mkhargrzeli family.

== Shaddadid rulers ==
=== Emirs in Dvin and Ganja ===
- Muhammad (951–54)
- Lashkari I (971–78)
- Marzuban (978–85)
- Fadl I (985–1031)
- Abu'l-Fath Musa (1031–34)
- Lashkari II (1034–49)
- Anushirvan (1049)
- Abu'l-Aswar Shavur I (1049–67)
- Fadl II (1067–73)
- Ashot (1068–69)
- Fadl III (1073–75)

=== Emirs in Ani ===
- Manuchihr (1072–1118)
- Abu'l-Aswar Shavur II (1118–24)
- Fadl IV (1125–?)
- Mahmud (?–1131)
- Khushchikr (1131–?)
- Fakr al-Din Shaddad (?–1155)
- Fadl V (1155–61)
- Shahanshah (1164–74)
- Sultan ibn Mahmud (?–ca. 1198/9)

== See also ==
- List of Sunni Muslim dynasties
- List of Kurdish dynasties and countries

== Sources ==
- Blair, Sheila S. (1991). "Surveyor versus Epigrapher". Muqarnas. 8. Brill.
- Bosworth, C.E. (1968). "The Political and Dynastic History of the Iranic World". In Boyle, J.A. (ed.). The Cambridge History of Iran:The Saljuq and Mongol Period. Vol. 5. Cambridge University Press.
- Bosworth, C.E.; Buchner, V.F. (1997). "Shabankara". In Bosworth, C.E.; van Donzel, E.; Heinrichs, W.P.; Lecomte, G. (eds.). The Encyclopedia of Islam. Vol. IX. Brill.
- Bosworth, C.E. (1997). "Shaddadids". The Encyclopedia of Islam. Vol. IX. Brill.
- Kennedy, Hugh (2016). The Prophet and the Age of the Caliphates. Routledge. ISBN 978-1-317-37639-2.
- Lornejad, Siavash; Doostzadeh, Ali (2012). Arakelova, Victoria; Asatrian, Garnik (eds.). On the modern politicization of the Persian poet Nezami Ganjavi (PDF). Caucasian Centre for Iranian Studies. Archived from the original (PDF) on 2022-09-14.
- Minorsky, V. (1949). "Caucasica in the History of Mayyāfāriqīn". Bulletin of the School of Oriental and African Studies. 13 (1). Cambridge University Press: 27–35. doi:10.1017/S0041977X00081830. S2CID 162745151.
- Minorsky, Vladimir (1953). Studies in Caucasian History. New York: Taylor’s Foreign Press. ISBN 0-521-05735-3.
- Minorsky, Vladimir; Boyle, John Andrew (1978). The Turks, Iran and the Caucasus in the Middle Ages. Variorum Reprints.
- Minorsky, V. (1993). "Tiflis". In Houtsma, M. Th.; van Donzel, E. (eds.). E. J. Brill's First Encyclopaedia of Islam, 1913–1936. Brill. ISBN 90-04-08265-4.
- Peacock, Andrew C. S. (2005). "Nomadic Society and the Seljūq Campaigns in Caucasia". Iran & the Caucasus. 9 (2): 205–230. doi:10.1163/157338405774829331.210
- Peacock, Andrew (2011). "SHADDADIDS". In Yarshater, Ehsan (ed.). Encyclopædia Iranica (Online ed.). Encyclopædia Iranica Foundation.
- Thomson, Robert W. (1996). Rewriting Caucasian History :The Medieval Armenian Adaptation of the Georgian Chronicles: The Original Georgian Texts and the Armenian Adaptation. Clarendon Press.
- Vacca, Alison (2017). Non-Muslim Provinces under Early Islam: Islamic Rule and Iranian Legitimacy in Armenia and Caucasian Albania. Cambridge University Press. ISBN 978-1-107-18851-8.
- . Demir, Ahmet (2025), Şeddâdîler Devleti Tarihi I- Kafkasya’da Bir Kürt Hanedanı Gence ve Dvin Şeddâdîleri (948-1088), Nûbihar Yayınları, İstanbul.
