= George III of Georgia =

King of Georgia from 1156 to 1184

George III გიორგი III
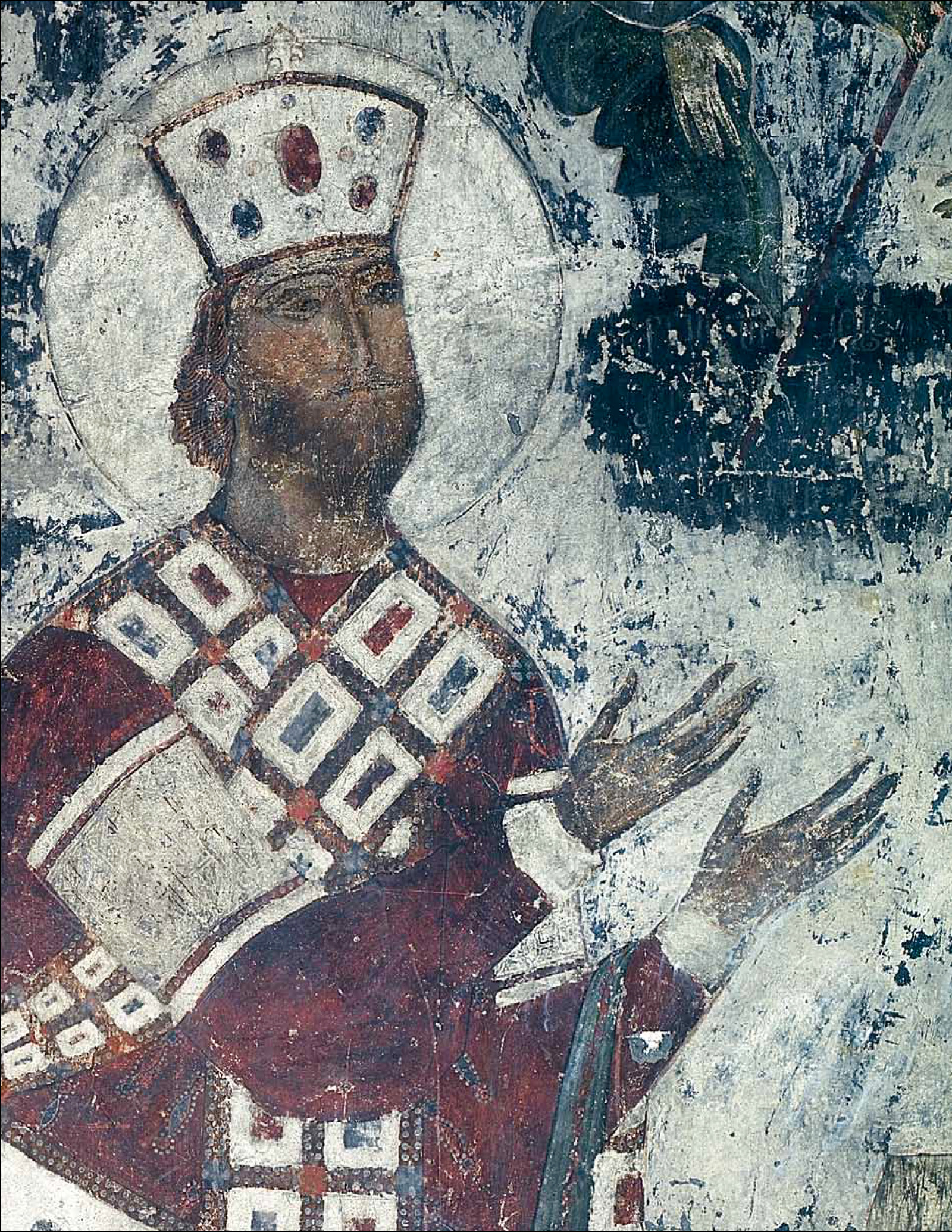
- George III as depicted on a medieval fresco from Vardzia

King of Georgia
- Reign: 1156–1184
- Predecessor: Demetrius I
- Successor: Tamar
- Co-ruler: Tamar (1178–1184)
- Died: 27 March 1184
- Burial: Gelati Monastery
- Spouse: Burdukhan of Alania
- Issue: Tamar of Georgia; Princess Rusudan
- Dynasty: Bagrationi
- Father: Demetrius I of Georgia
- Religion: Georgian Orthodox Church
- Khelrtva

George III (Georgian: გიორგი III, romanized: giorgi III; died 27 March 1184), of the Bagrationi dynasty, was the 8th king (mepe) of Georgia from 1156 to 1184. He became king when his father, Demetrius I, died in 1156, which was preceded by his brother's revolt against their father in 1154. His reign was part of what would be called the Georgian Golden Age – a historical period in the High Middle Ages, during which the Kingdom of Georgia reached the peak of its military power and development.

== Biography ==
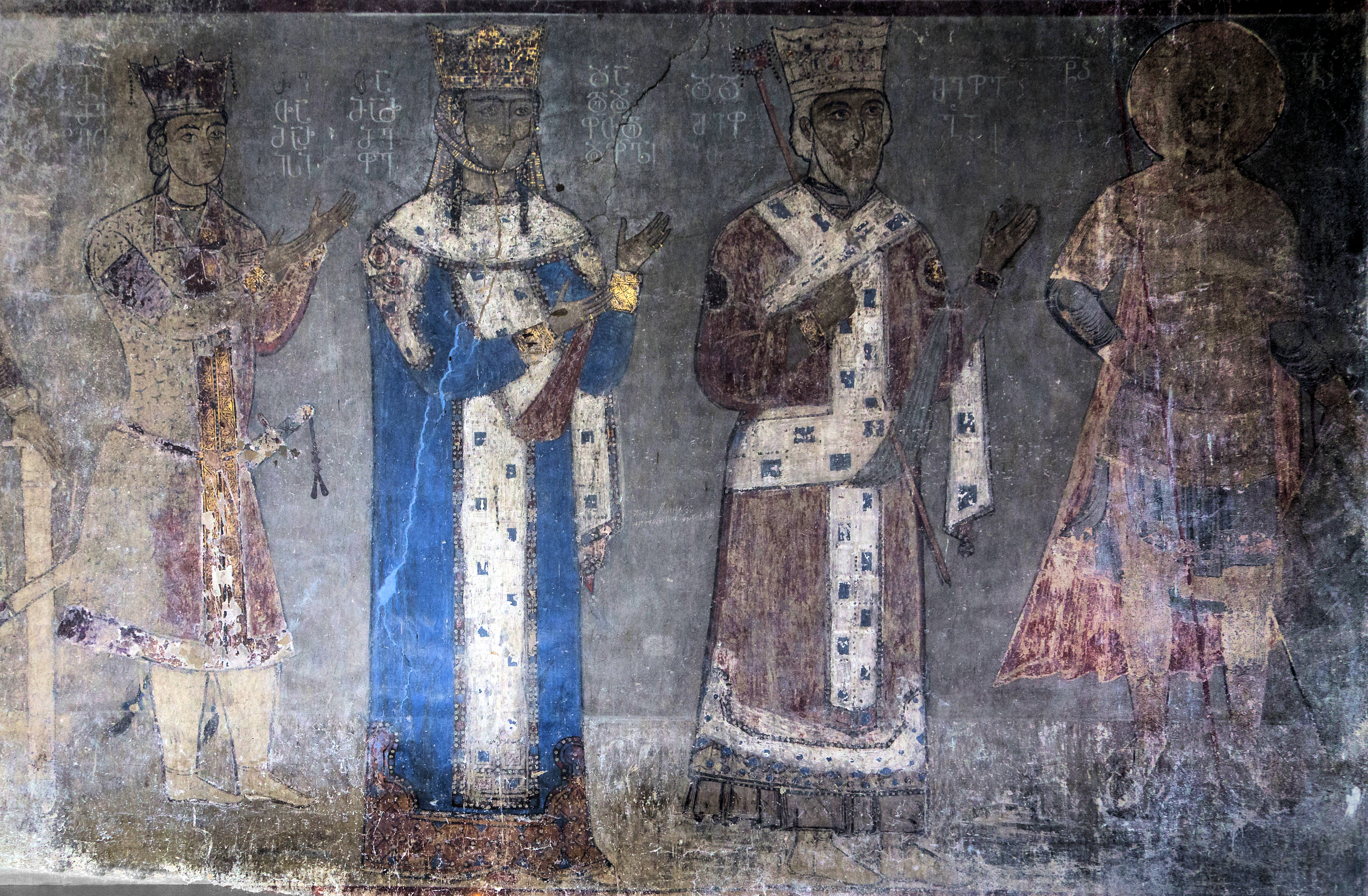
The royal panel at the Betania Monastery: George IV Lasha, Tamar, and George III (from left to right).

He succeeded on his father Demetrius I's death in 1156. He changed his father's defensive policy into a more aggressive one and resumed offensive against the neighboring Seljuqid rulers in Armenia. The same year he ascended to the throne, George launched a successful campaign against the Shah-Armens. It may be said that the Shah-Armen took part in almost all the campaigns undertaken against Georgia between 1130s to 1160s. Moreover, Shah-Armens enlisted the assistance of Georgian feudals disaffected with the Georgian monarchs and gave them asylum.

In 1156 the Ani's Christian population rose against the emir Fakr al-Din Shaddad, a vassal of George III, and turned the town over to his brother Fadl ibn Mahmud. But Fadl, too, apparently could not satisfy the people of Ani, and this time the town was offered to the George III, who took advantage of this offer and subjugated Ani, appointing his general Ivane Orbeli as its ruler in 1161. A coalition consisting of the ruler of Ahlat, Shah-Armen Sökmen II, the ruler of Diyarbekir, Kotb ad-Din il-Ghazi, Al-Malik of Erzerum, and others was formed as soon as the Georgians seized the town, but the latter defeated the allies. He then marched against one of the members of the coalition, the king of Erzerum, and in the same year, 1161, defeated and made him prisoner, but then released him for a large ransom. The capture of Ani and the defeat of the Saltukid-forces enabled the Georgian king to march on Dvin. The following year in August/September 1162, Dvin was temporarily occupied and sacked, the non-Christian population was pillaged and the Georgian troops returned home loaded with booty. The king appointed Ananiya, a member of the local feudal nobility to govern the town.

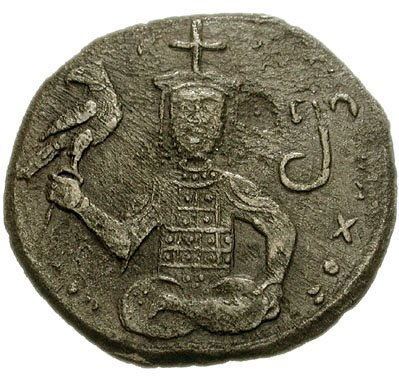
Georgian coin from the time of George III, with a similar pose to that of Islamic rulers, such as Artuq Arslan.

A coalition of Muslim rulers led by Ildeniz, ruler of Adarbadagan and some other regions, embarked upon a campaign against Georgia in early 1163. He was joined by the Shah-Armen Sökmen II, Ak-Sunkur, ruler of Maragha, and others. With an army of 50,000 troops they marched on Georgia. The Georgian army was defeated. The enemy took the fortress of Gagi, laid waste as far as the region of Gagi and Gegharkunik, seized prisoners and booty, and then moved to Ani. The Muslim rulers were jubilant, and they prepared for a new campaign. However, this time they were forestalled by George III, who marched into Arran at the beginning of 1166, occupied a region extending to Ganja, devastated the land and turn back with prisoners and booty. In 1167, George III marched to defend his vassal Shah Aghsartan of Shirvan against the Khazar and Kipchak assaults and strengthened the Georgian dominance in the area.

There seemed to be no end to the war between George III and atabeg Eldiguz. But the belligerents were exhausted to such an extent that Eldiguz proposed an armistice. George had no choice but to make peace. He restored Ani to its former rulers, the Shaddadids, who became his vassals. The Shaddadids, ruled the town for about 10 years, but in 1174 King George took the Shahanshah ibn Mahmud as a prisoner and occupied Ani once again. Ivane Orbeli, was appointed governor of the town. Throughout this period, the Georgian army was swelling with Armenian volunteers, enthusiastically participating in the Iiberation of their country.

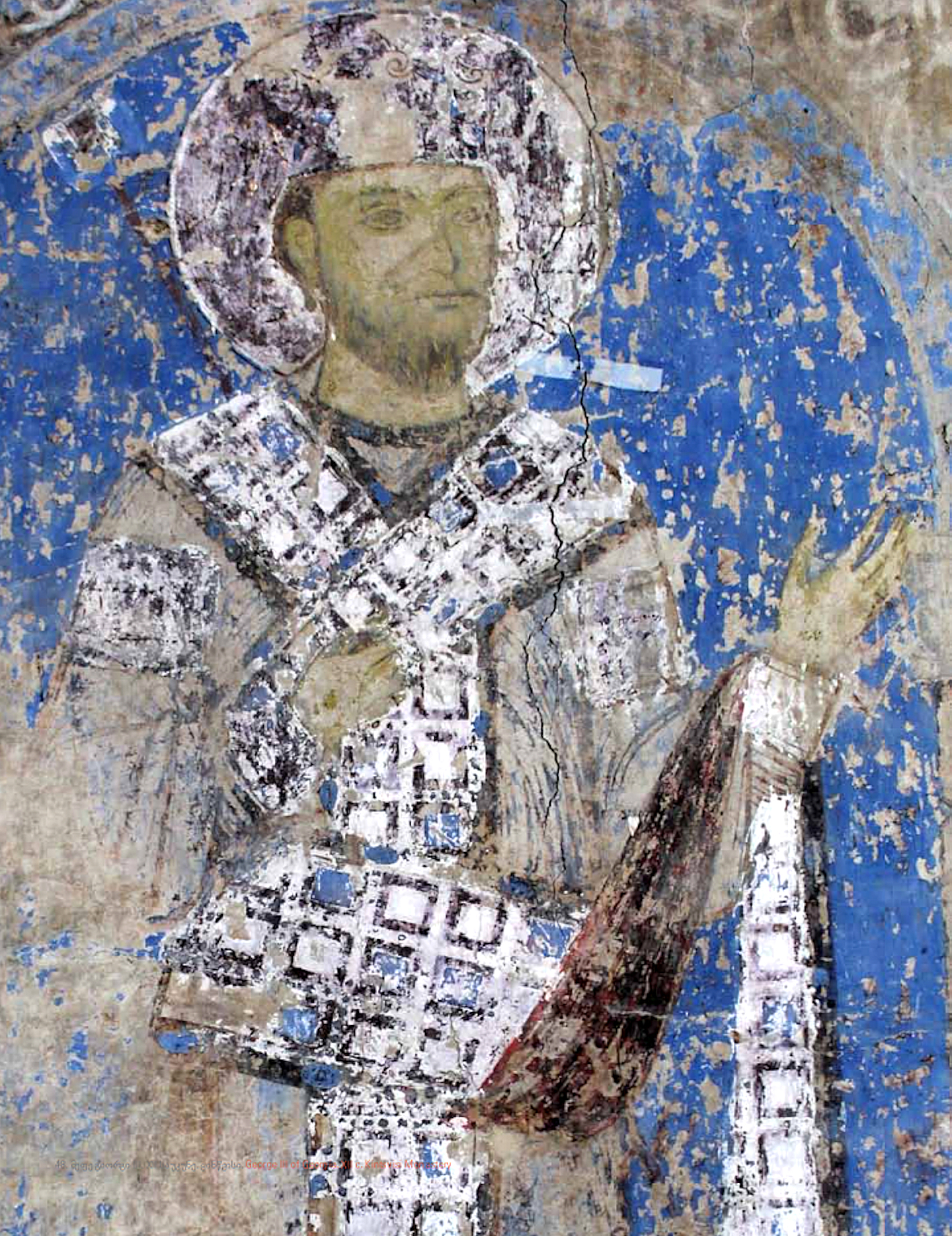
Fresco of George III from the Kintsvisi Monastery.

In 1177 George III was confronted by a rebellious faction of nobles. The rebels intended to dethrone George in favor of the king's fraternal nephew, Demna, who was considered by many to be a legitimate royal heir of his murdered father, David V. Demna's cause was little but a pretext for the nobles, led by the pretender's father-in-law, the amirspasalar ("high constable") Ivane Orbeli, to weaken the crown. George III was able to crush the revolt and embarked on a crackdown campaign on the defiant aristocratic clans; Ivane Orbeli was put to death and the surviving members of his family were driven out of Georgia. Demna, castrated and blinded on his uncle's order, did not survive the mutilation and soon died in prison. Once the rebellion was suppressed and the pretender eliminated, George went ahead to co-opt his daughter Tamar into government with him and crowned her as co-ruler in 1178. By doing so, the king attempted to preempt any dispute after his death and legitimize his line on the throne of Georgia. At the same time, he raised men from the Kipchaks as well as from the gentry and unranked classes to keep the dynastic aristocracy away from the center of power.

He died in 1184, and was succeeded by Tamar. He was buried at Gelati Monastery, western Georgia.

== Family ==
George was married to Burdukhan, daughter of the King of Alania. They had two daughters:

- Tamar of Georgia (c. 1160 – 1213), who succeeded her father and reigned as the first female monarch of Georgia (r. 1184–1213), presiding over the Georgian Golden Age;
- Princess Rusudan, who married Manuel Komnenos, son of Byzantine Emperor Andronikos I. They were the parents of Alexios and David, founders of the Empire of Trebizond.

== See also ==
- List of Georgian Kings
  - Georgian monarchs family tree

== Bibliography ==
- Khazanov, Anatoly M.; Wink, André, eds. (2001). Nomads in the Sedentary World. London and New York: Routledge. ISBN 0-7007-1369-7.
- Eastmond, Antony (1998). Royal Imagery in Medieval Georgia. University Park: Pennsylvania State Press. ISBN 0-271-01628-0.

| Preceded by Demetrius I | King of Georgia; 1156–1184 | Succeeded by Tamar |
