= Manuchihr ibn Shavur =

Shaddadid emir of Ani from c. 1072 to 1118

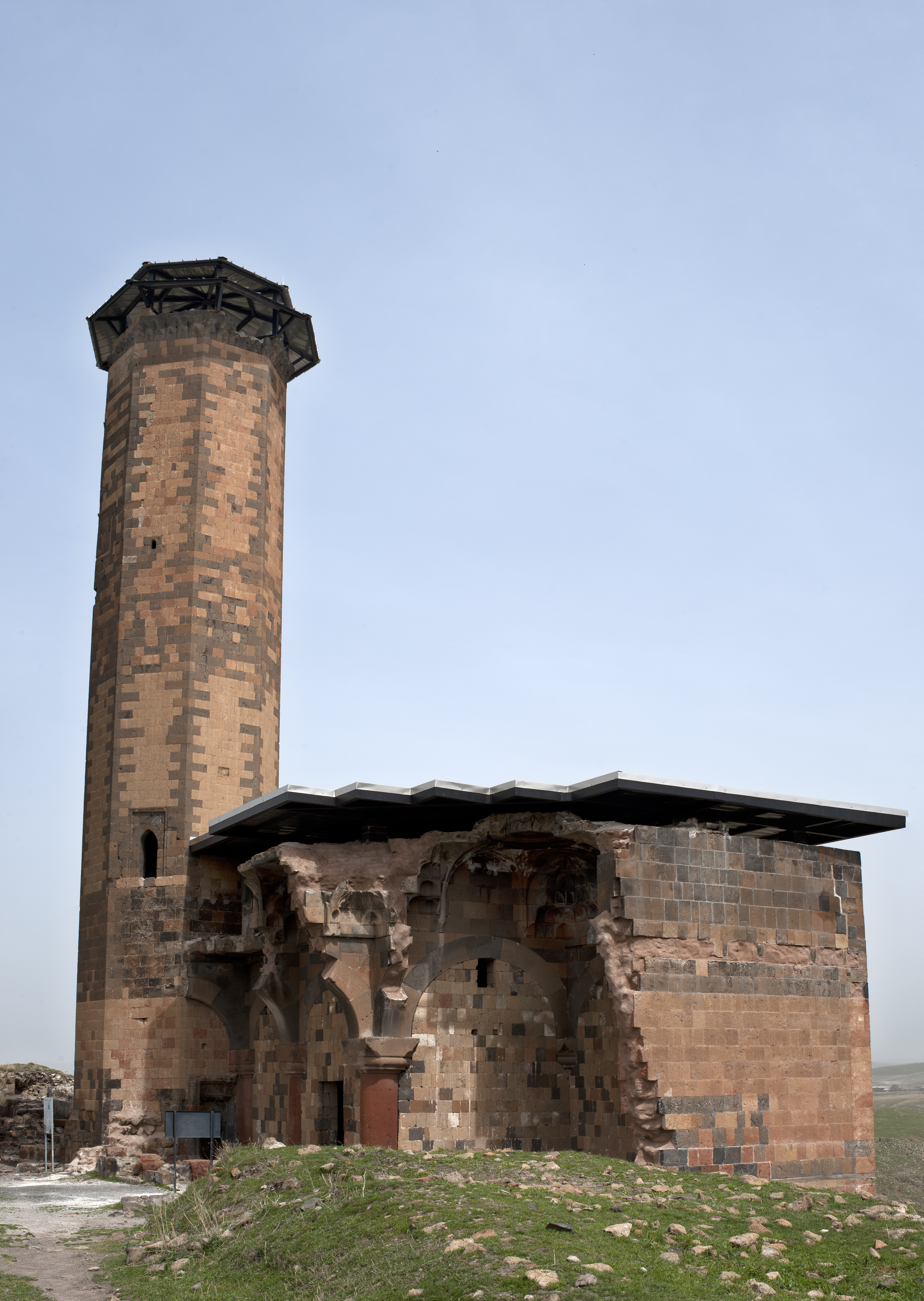
The ruins of Menüçehr Mosque in Ani

Manuchihr ibn Shavur was a Kurdish Shaddadid emir of Ani from c. 1072 to 1118, the first of the dynasty to rule this key city, formerly an Armenian royal capital.

Manuchihr b. Shavur began his rule under the suzerainty of the Seljuk sultan Melikşah. During his reign, Ani suffered a famine and military pressure from the Seljuks. Manuchihr sponsored several building projects, including a mosque, fortifications, a large bath, and a caravansarai. He also patronized the poet Asadi Tusi. He was succeeded by his son, Abu'l-Aswar Shavur ibn Manuchihr.
