= Fadl ibn Mahmud =

Shaddadid emir of Ani from 1155 to 1161

Fadl V ibn Mahmud was a Shaddadid emir of Ani from 1155 to 1161.

Fadl V succeeded his brother Fakr al-Din Shaddad ibn Mahmud, who was deposed in a revolt. His own rule was brought to end by an invasion by King George III of Georgia, who took Ani in 1161 and appointed his general Ivane Orbeli as its ruler. In the following years, Ani changed hands several times as Georgians were opposed by Saltukids, Artuqids, and Eldiguzids, but the role of the Shaddadids in these events are not recorded. Fadl V's brother, Shahanshah ibn Mahmud, would accede to the emirate of Ani in 1164.
