= Abu'l-Aswar Shavur ibn Manuchihr =

Shaddadid emir of Ani

Abu'l-Aswar Shavur ibn Manuchihr was the Kurdish Shaddadid emir of Ani from c. 1118 to 1124.

A son and successor of Manuchihr b. Shavur, Abu'l-Aswar was accused by the contemporary Armenian historian Vardan Areveltsi of persecuting Christians and attempting to sell Ani to the Seljuk emir of Kars. His rule was terminated by the resurgent King David IV of Georgia, whom Ani surrendered without a fight in 1124. Abu'l-Aswar Shavur ended his days as a captive of the Georgians in exile in Abkhazia, while Ani was given by David IV to his general, Abulet. Abu'l-Aswar Shavur's son Fadl would be able to resume the Shaddadid reign in Ani in 1125.

== Sources ==
- Peacock, Andrew (2011). "Shaddadids". Encyclopædia Iranica.
