= Fakr al-Din Shaddad ibn Mahmud =

Shaddadid emir of Ani from sometime after 1131 until 1155

Fakr al-Din Shaddad ibn Mahmud was the Kurdish Shaddadid emir of Ani from sometime after 1131 until 1155.

Fakr al-Din Shaddad b. Mahmud spent most of his reign in attempts to fend off the resurgent Georgians. To this end, he sought to forge a marital alliance with the Saltukids of Erzurum and even tried to sell them Ani, but he eventually defected the Saltukids to King Demetrius I of Georgia. A revolt in Ani forced Fakr al-Din Shaddad into exile in the Ayyubid state in Syria. He spent his last years, living near Ani, but without entertaining power. His successor was his brother, Fadl V.
