= Sökmen II =

Ruler of the Shah-Armens from 1128 to 1185

Nāṣir al-Dīn Sökmen II (died 1185) was the Shāh-i Arman, the ruler of the Turkoman principality centred on Ahlat, from 1128 until his death. He married Shāhbānū, daughter of ′Izz al-Dīn Saltuq II, ruler of the Saltukids of Erzurum. He and his wife both engaged in major building projects that brought the Shāh-i Armanid state to its zenith.

In 1164, Shāhbānū rebuilt the ruined citadel of Ahlat and the roads leading into the city, replaced the old wooden bridges with new stone ones and constructed large new inns inside the city. She employed an engineer named Qaraqush, who completed the massive construction project in only a few months. None of these works have been survived, all being destroyed after the siege of Ahlat in 1229–30, when the Khwarazmshah Jalāl al-Dīn captured the city.

Sökmen founded a city, Sukmānābād, named after himself. It lay west of Khoy on the caravan route between Ahlat and Tabriz. Its ruins have not been found. Sökmen died without heirs, condemning his principality to a period of instability that lasted until 1207.
