= Shahanshah ibn Mahmud =

Shaddadid emir of Ani from 1164 to 1174

Shahanshah ibn Mahmud was the Kurdish Shaddadid emir of Ani from 1164 to 1174.

With Shahanshah b. Mahmud's accession, the Shaddadids were reestablished in Ani, which had mostly been under Georgian control since 1161. This was a result of the victory of Eldiguz, a resurgent atabeg of Azerbaijan, who conquered Ani from the Georgians after several attempts and handed the city over to Shahanshah on terms of vassalage. Unable to fend off further Georgian encroachments, he lost Ani in 1174 and himself died in exile in the Ayyubid lands.
