= Abu'l-Aswar Shavur ibn Fadl =

Ruler of Dvin and Arran from 1022 to 1067

- Ruler of Dvin and Arran
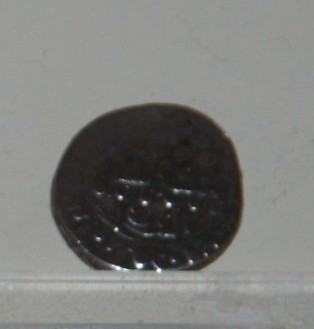
- Silver dirham of Shavur ibn Fadl, National Museum of History of Azerbaijan
- Reign: 1022–1067
- Predecessor: Anushirvan ibn Lashkari
- Successor: Fadl ibn Shavur
- Died: 19 November 1067; Ganja
- Spouse: Unnamed Bagratuni noblewoman
- Issue: al-Fadl, Ashot, Iskandar, Manuchihr, Marzuban, unnamed daughter
- Dynasty: Shaddadids
- Father: Fadl ibn Muhammad

Abu'l-Aswar or Abu'l-Asvar Shavur ibn Fadl ibn Muhammad ibn Shaddad also known as Aplesphares, was a member of the Shaddadid dynasty. Between 1049 and 1067 he was the eighth Shaddadid ruler of Arran (today in western Azerbaijan) from Ganja. Prior to that, he ruled the city of Dvin (in what is now Armenia and northeastern Turkey) from 1022 as an autonomous lord. A capable warrior, and a wise and cunning ruler, Abu'l-Aswar was engaged in several conflicts with most of his neighbours.

During his rule over Dvin, he was mostly involved in the affairs of the Armenian principalities. He collaborated with the Byzantine Empire in its conquest of the last remnants of Bagratid Armenia in 1045, but when the Byzantines later turned on him, he survived three successive offensives that sought to take Ganja. In 1049, a revolt in Ganja overthrew his infant great-great-nephew, Anushirvan. The rebels invited him to take up the family's emirate, and he moved from Dvin to Ganja. Under his rule, the Shaddadid dynasty reached its zenith. He undertook successful campaigns into Georgia and Shirvan, although the limits of Shaddadid power were exposed by his failure to take over the Emirate of Tiflis and by devastating raids by the Alans. At the same time, his reign witnessed the rapid rise of the Seljuk Empire and the extension of its control over the Transcaucasian principalities.

Abu'l-Aswar became a Seljuk vassal in 1054/5. Although he gained control over the former Armenian capital of Ani through Seljuk patronage in 1065, this association also paved the way for the dynasty's decline after his death in November 1067.

== Origin ==
The main historical source on the Shaddadids is the work of the Ottoman historian Münejjim Bashi (died 1702). Münejjim Bashi considered the family to be of Kurdish origin, a view widely accepted by modern scholars. The family's founder, Muhammad ibn Shaddad, briefly seized control of Dvin in the early 950s. The family then moved to Ganja, the main Muslim town of Arran, which was seized by Muhammad's sons Lashkari (I), Marzuban, and Fadl (I) c. 970. The brothers successively ruled the city as emirs after that. Abu'l-Aswar Shavur was the second son of the youngest of the three brothers and the fourth Shaddadid ruler, Fadl. In his long reign (985–1031), Fadl expanded the family's control over much of Arran as well as parts of Armenia, capturing Syunik. Fadl was succeeded as emir at Ganja by his eldest son Musa (r. 1031–1034) who was in turn murdered by his own son Abu'l-Hasan Lashkari (II) (r. 1034–1049). Abu'l-Aswar Shavur's name is an Arabic–Persian hybrid: "Shavur" is the old Persian name "Shapur", while his kunya contains the Arabicized form of the Iranian (possibly Daylamite) name "Asvar" (cognate with savar, "horseman, knight").

== Lord of Dvin (1022–49) ==
Political map of the Caucasus region c. 1060

Münejjim Bashi records that at the time of his death in 1067, Abu'l-Aswar's total reign, both in Ganja and before that "over some territories", had lasted 46 years. "Some territories" clearly refers to his rule over Dvin, known from other sources, meaning that he became ruler of the city in c. 1022. The city, although part of the Bagratid Kingdom of Armenia, had been left defenceless after the death of Gagik I of Armenia in 1020 and the dispute of his sons over their inheritance, and suffered a devastating Daylamite raid in 1021, which effectively cut it off from the remainder of the Armenian kingdom. In the aftermath, the city appears to have sought the protection of the Shaddadids, and Abu'l-Aswar became its ruler. From this base, he pursued a virtually independent course from his brother, and later his nephew, in Ganja, focusing more on Armenia than Arran. Abu'l-Aswar was intimately connected with the Armenian princely houses, having married a sister of David I Anhoghin, King of Tashir. His second son even bore the typically Armenian name of Ashot. Due to his focus on the affairs of his domain, he is not mentioned by Münejjim Bashi until his takeover of the main family seat at Ganja in 1049. For his activities in the period 1022–49, the main sources derive from his opponents, the Armenians and the Byzantines.

Abu'l-Aswar is first recorded by the history of Matthew of Edessa in 1040, when the Armenian nobleman Abirat, who had become embroiled in the dispute between Gagik I's sons Ashot IV and Hovhannes-Smbat III, came to Dvin. Fearful of the latter's displeasure, Abirat, with 12,000 horsemen, sought Abu'l-Aswar's protection. Abu'l-Aswar initially welcomed Abirat and gave him a high position but soon came to mistrust him, and had him killed, whereupon Abirat's lieutenant Sare departed for Ani with Abirat's supporters. Despite their kinship, at about the same time Abu'l-Aswar attacked David of Tashir. The Shaddadid army, numbering an impossible 150,000 according to Matthew of Edessa, captured much of Tashir, but David was able to assemble a broad alliance against Abu'l-Aswar. David himself fielded 10,000 troops; Hovhannes-Smbat III of Ani sent 3,000 men; the King of Kapan sent 2,000, and even the King of Georgia sent 4,000, while David also secured the public backing of the Catholicos of Albania. As a result, Abu'l-Aswar was defeated and evicted from Tashir.

Ashot IV and Hovhannes-Smbat III died at almost the same time (c. 1040/41), and Ashot's son Gagik II (r. 1042–1045) succeeded them both and began consolidating his position. The chief danger to his throne was the Byzantine Empire, which throughout the early 11th century had been encroaching on the Armenian principalities. Hovhannes-Smbat had even bequeathed his kingdom to the Empire, and after his death, Emperor Michael IV the Paphlagonian (r. 1034–1041) sent troops to capture Ani. Gagik managed to repel the attack, and political turmoil in Constantinople gained him a couple of years of reprieve after that, but in 1042 a new emperor, Constantine IX Monomachos (r. 1042–1055), came to the throne determined to secure Byzantine claims in Armenia.

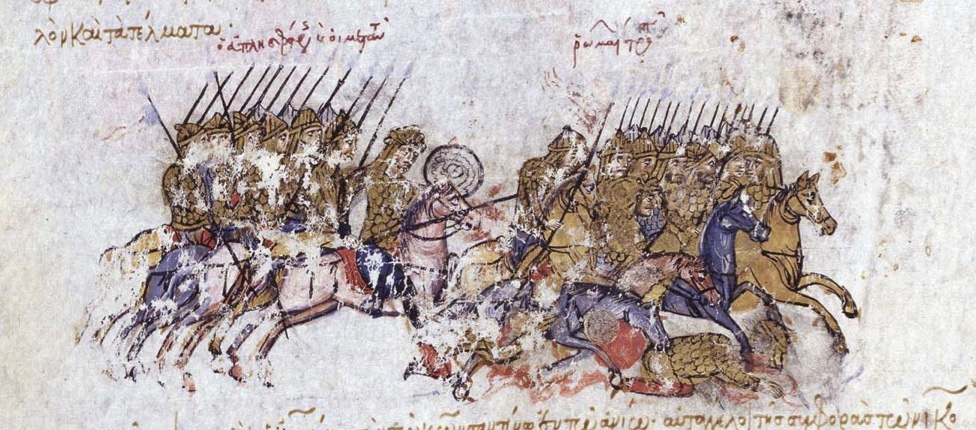
The defeat of the Byzantines before Dvin, miniature from the Madrid Skylitzes

To this end, he contacted Abu'l-Aswar and called upon him to attack the Armenians from the rear. Abu'l-Aswar agreed, in exchange for guarantees that he would retain his conquests, a request granted in an imperial chrysobull. Faced with a two-pronged assault, Gagik was forced to visit Constantinople. There he was kept hostage and Ani was surrendered to the Byzantines in 1045. Notwithstanding his previous promises, immediately after taking possession of Ani, the emperor requested that Abu'l-Aswar vacate the fortresses he had conquered. When the latter refused, a large army under Michael Iasites and the magistros Constantine the Alan, containing numerous Armenians, marched against Dvin. Abu'l-Aswar let them approach, and then opened the irrigation canals and flooded the plain around the city. Stuck in the mud, the besiegers were easy prey for the Shaddadid archers, who inflicted huge casualties on the Byzantine force. Constantine IX responded by placing Katakalon Kekaumenos and the parakoimomenos Constantine in charge of Armenia. Instead of attacking Dvin, however, the new Byzantine leadership concentrated its efforts on recovering the forts captured by Abu'l-Aswar. Surmari, Anberd, and Khor Virap fell to the Byzantine army, but Chelidonion (modern Yerevan) resisted until September 1047, when the outbreak of a rebellion led by Leo Tornikios forced the army's recall to Constantinople. A peace treaty was hastily concluded, whereby Abu'l-Aswar agreed not to raid Byzantine territory and to recognize the authority of the emperor.

The successful resistance of Dvin put an end to the Byzantine advance in Armenia, helping preserve the independence of the smaller Armenian realms of Syunik, Tashir and Khachen. Soon after, the regional balance of power was permanently altered with the first large-scale raid of the Seljuk Turks under Qutlumush ibn Arslan Isra'il and Ibrahim Inal into Byzantine Armenia in 1048. While the Shaddadids may have been tempted to see in them welcome allies against the Byzantines, they were equally likely to be a threat, as demonstrated by the attack on Ganja by Qutlumush in 1046/47.

Shortly after, in late 1048 or early 1049—although some authors have suggested a later date, c. 1050 (A.F. Gfrörer and M.H. Yinanç) or even c. 1055/56 (E. Honigmann)—the Byzantines launched another offensive against Dvin under the rhaiktor Nikephoros. According to the contemporary Byzantine historian John Skylitzes, this was because Abu'l-Aswar ("Aplesphares", as the Byzantines called him) had violated the previous agreement and raided Byzantine lands. The Shaddadid ruler remained ensconced in Dvin, while the Byzantines devastated its environs "as far as the Iron Bridge and Ganja", forcing Abu'l-Aswar to renew his previous oath of subservience and hand over his great-nephew Ardashir, the son of Abu'l-Hasan Lashkari, as a hostage.

== Emir of Ganja (1049–67) ==
In 1049, Abu'l-Aswar's nephew Lashkari, the emir of Ganja, died, after a troubled reign of 15 years. He was succeeded by his infant son Anushirvan, but actual power was in the hands of his chamberlain (hajib), Abu Mansur. After barely two months, a group of elders opposed to the new regime's policies deposed Abu Mansur while he was at Shamkur and called upon Abu'l-Aswar to assume control of Ganja as well. Abu'l-Aswar agreed and abandoned Dvin, which had become too exposed to the Byzantines. The city was left in the hands of a series of governors until 1053, when he appointed his son Abu Nasr Iskandar as ruler of the city and the surrounding regions. The Shaddadid ruler first set things in order in Shamkur, and then entered Ganja, taking possession of "all the lands of Arran and its fortresses".

At this point in his career, Abu'l-Aswar had achieved a considerable reputation as a ruler and a warrior; the Ziyarid prince Keikavus (r. 1050–1087), who later wrote a well-known mirror for princes, the Qabusnameh, even came to Ganja and spent several years at the Shaddadid court to participate in the jihad against the Christians, after having spent eight years at the court of Maw'dud of Ghazni. According to Keikavus, his host was "a great king, a man firm and clever, [...] just, courageous, eloquent dialectician, of pure faith and far-sighted". This estimate was shared by the Byzantines, for Skylitzes likewise calls him "as clever a strategist as anybody else, capable of thwarting the enemies' tactics and policies", while Münejjim Bashi writes that after his takeover of Ganja, "Abu'l-Aswar [...] restored the name of the dynasty to life after it had nearly died out. He became strong and the situation of the subjects and the army became orderly."

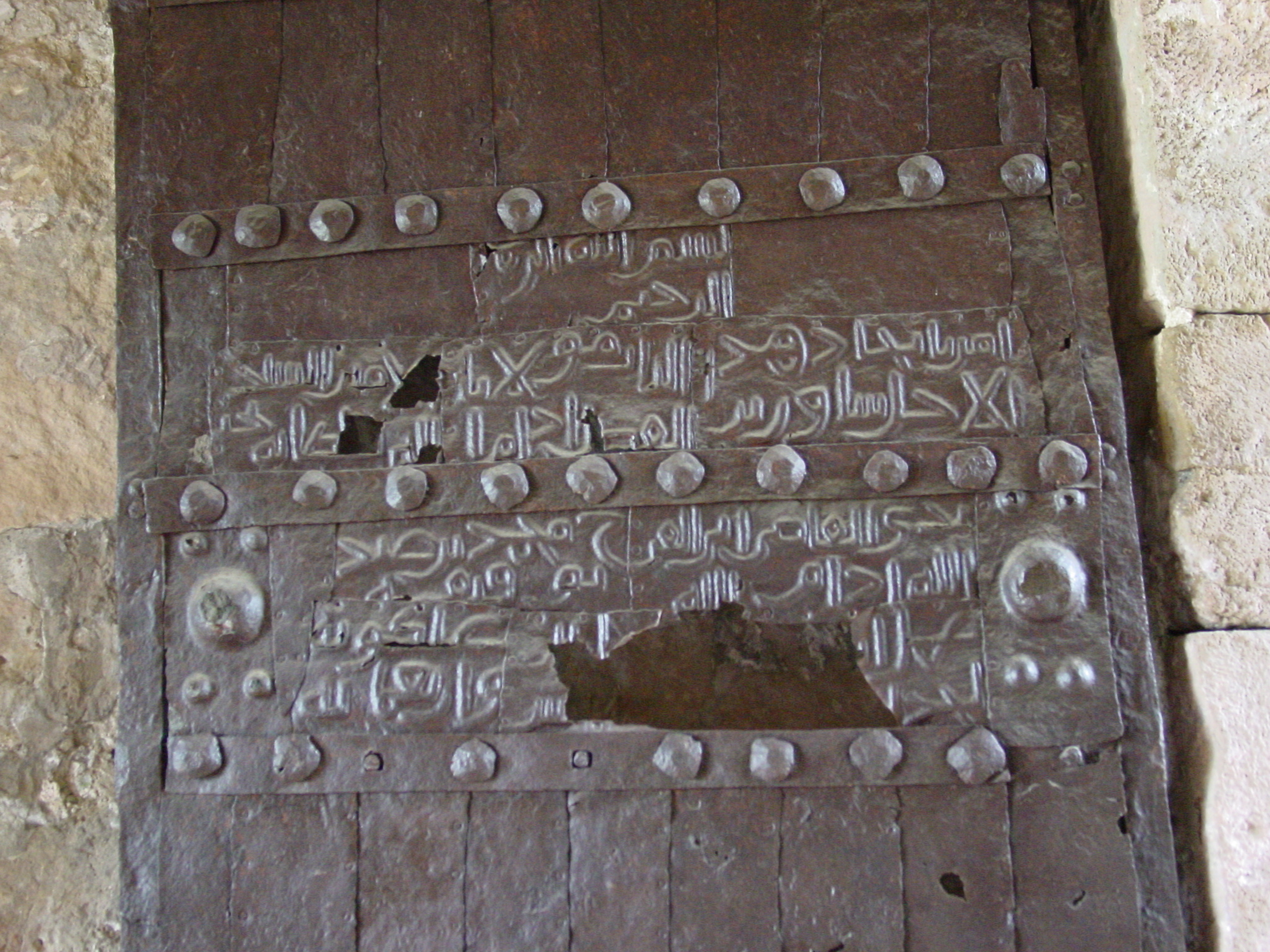
The gates of Ganja, installed under Abu'l-Aswar's orders in 1062, now at the Gelati Monastery in Georgia

According to Münejjim Bashi, in 1053, Abu'l-Aswar seized the (unidentified) fortress of Basra from the Georgians, and refortified and garrisoned it with many men. In 1054/5, along with many of the neighbouring rulers, he became a vassal of the Seljuk Sultan Toghrul Beg (r. 1037–1063), although at least initially the impact of Seljuk overlordship seems to have been light, as neither Toghrul nor his successor Alp Arslan (r. 1063–1072) appeared on Shaddadid coinage at this time. In 1062, Abu'l-Aswar received a delegation from the Emirate of Tiflis, an isolated Muslim stronghold within the Christian Georgian kingdoms. Following the death of Emir Ja'far ibn Ali, the locals had evicted his quarrelling sons, and now asked Abu'l-Aswar to assume control of the city. The Shaddadid ruler was inclined to accept, but his vizier, Bakhtiyar ibn Salman, dissuaded him by warning that such an action would disperse his limited forces. After Abu'l-Aswar's refusal, Tiflis was occupied by the Georgians, until they were evicted by Alp Arslan in 1068. This event highlighted the limitations of Shaddadid power, which was further demonstrated by an Alan invasion lead by Durgulel the Great through the Darial Pass in the same year: more than 20,000 inhabitants of Arran were carried off as slaves, according to Münejjim Bashi's account. In response to the Alan threat, Abu'l-Aswar built a wall and moat around the suburb (rabad) of his capital Ganja. The gates installed by Abu'l-Aswar for this new fortification were carried off by the Georgians under Demetrius I in 1139, and are still preserved at the Gelati Monastery in modern Georgia. In 2012–14, replicas of the original gates were installed in Ganja's Museum of Archaeology and Ethnography.

At the same time, Abu'l-Aswar's relations with his neighbour, Shirvanshah Fariburz I (r. 1063–1069), abruptly deteriorated. The two dynasties were linked by family ties—Fariburz's predecessor, Sallar (r. 1050–1063), had even been married to a daughter of Abu'l-Aswar—but now the Shaddadid ruler launched a series of invasions against Shirvan. In spring 1063, Abu'l-Aswar captured the Quylamiyan castle, marched on to the capital of Shirvan, Shamakhi, defeated the Shirvanshah's forces in battle, plundered their camp, and captured his own daughter, her treasure and retinue. He then withdrew to Arran, but in July returned to Shirvan to raid it. In the next year, he again invaded Shirvan and captured a number of fortresses, while the local Kurdish tribes went over to him. After his return to Ganja, a peace treaty was signed with the Shirvanshah in June/July 1064, whereby Abu'l-Aswar returned Quylamiyan in exchange for 40,000 gold dinars. In 1064, the Seljuk sultan Alp Arslan invaded Byzantine Armenia and took Ani. Abu'l-Aswar himself led raids into the area, capturing the unidentified fortress of Wyjyn ("one of the best in Armenia" according to Münejjim Bashi). Münejjim Bashi further records that Alp Arslan handed over control of Ani to him; Ibn al-Athir reports the transfer to an unnamed emir, while Vardan Areveltsi records that the fortress was granted only to Abu'l-Aswar's son and successor, Fadl. Immediately after his return to Ganja and the dispersal of his army, however, the Alans again crossed the Darial Pass in October 1065, and, allied with the inhabitants of Shakki, raided Arran. At Shamkur they killed more than 200 volunteers for the jihad, and raided even to the very gates of Ganja itself, before moving on to raid the environs of Barda'a. Abu'l-Aswar and his troops preferred to remain within the protection of the walled cities rather than face the raiders in the field, and the Alans reached all the way to the Araxes before turning back north, along with the prisoners they had taken.

Abu'l-Aswar died on 19 November 1067, and was buried at the main mosque of Ganja. He was succeeded by his eldest son, Fadl II, whom he had already announced as his heir, and to whom the oath of allegiance (bay'ah) had been taken by the Shaddadid family, the army, and the people of Arran. Apart from Fadl, Abu'l-Aswar had four more sons—Ashot, Iskandar, Manuchihr, and Marzuban—as well as an unnamed daughter, wife of the Shirvanshah Sallar.

Abu'l-Aswar's reign represented the zenith of the Shaddadid dynasty, but their fall began almost immediately after his death: the Seljuks strengthened their grip on Arran and the other principalities of the region, and Alp Arslan visited Ganja in person to extract an enormous tribute. Fadl II's reign was troubled—at one point he was captured and held by the Georgians for eight months—but he managed to capture Derbent. Fadl II was overthrown by his son Fadlun (Fadl III) in 1073, who was in turn deposed in 1075 by the Turkish ghulam Sav Tegin, to whom the Seljuks had assigned control of Arran and Derbent. This ended the family's rule over Arran, but a junior line, led by Abu'l-Aswar's third son Manuchihr, continued to govern Ani as emirs, initially as Seljuk, and later as Georgian, vassals. This last branch of the Shaddadids maintained a precarious independence until the end of their dynasty in c. 1200.

== See also ==
- Seljuk invasion of Anatolia

== Sources ==
- Bosworth, C. E. (1968). "The Political and Dynastic History of the Iranian World (A.D. 1000–1217)". In Boyle, John Andrew (ed.). The Cambridge History of Iran: The Saljuq and Mongol Periods. Vol. 5. Cambridge: Cambridge University Press. pp. 1–202. ISBN 0-521-06936-X.
- Minorsky, Vladimir (1977) [1953]. Studies in Caucasian History. Cambridge: Cambridge University Press. ISBN 0-521-05735-3.
- Peacock, Andrew (2011). "Shaddadids". Encyclopædia Iranica, Online Edition.
- Ter-Ghewondyan, Aram (1976) [1965]. The Arab Emirates in Bagratid Armenia. Translated by Garsoïan, Nina. Lisbon: Livraria Bertrand.

| Preceded by Anushirvan ibn Lashkari | Shaddadid emir of Ganja; 1049–1067 | Succeeded by Fadl ibn Shavur |
