= Muhammad ibn Shaddad =

10th century Kurdish tribal chief and founder of Shaddadid dynasty

- Emir

Emir of Dvin and Shaddadids
- Reign: 951–954
- Successor: Marzuban ibn Muhammad (as ruler of Dvin); Lashkari ibn Muhammad (successor of Shaddadid throne)
- Died: 955; Vaspurakan
- Issue: Lashkari, Marzuban, Fadhl
- Dynasty: Shaddadid dynasty
- Father: Shaddad

Muhammad ibn Shaddad also known as Muhammad ibn Shaddad ibn qurtaq (Arabic: محمد بن شداد; Kurdish: Muhemmedê kurê Şedadê kurê Kurto) was a Kurdish tribal Chief, founder and first ruler of the Shaddadid dynasty. He captured Dvin from the Sallarids in 951, although apparently the citadel remained in the hands of a Daylamite garrison loyal to the Sallarids. He managed to maintain his control until 954, when the Sallarids retook the town. Muhammad, his family and his supporters fled to Vaspurakan, where he died in 955.

== Biography ==
=== Origins ===
Muhammad ibn Shaddad was chief of a Kurdish Sunni Muslim pastoralist tribe. Vladimir Minorsky suggests that Shaddad, father of Muhammad was originally from Jazira in Hasaniya district. Muhammad ibn Shaddad was chief of the Sub-tribe of Hadhbāni tribe.

=== Emir of Dwin ===
Muhammad ibn Shaddad Was able to capture Dwin in 951, due to the weakening of the Sallarid kingdom of Adharbayjan. Due to absence of authority, He, his family and clan were welcomed by the people of Dwin, to protect them from Daylamite and Armenian raiders who surrounded the region most of the time. Ibrahim ibn Marzuban, the Sallarid ruler, tried to retake Dwin first by encouraging the Armenian population and others in the surrounding region to retake Dwin then by coming from the capital, Ardabil. However he failed in these attempts. Muhammad ibn Shaddad built a quarter for himself and his tribesmen outside the city walls of Dwin. In 954, the Sallarid ruler Marzuban was able to retake the city of Dwin due to the defection of its Daylamite garrison. Muhammad ibn Shaddad fled to principality of Vaspurakan, where Kurds and Armenians coexisted peacefully.

=== Exile and death ===
In Vaspurakan, he tried to gain the Support of Roman authority to retake his lost Domain without any effect. He died shortly afterwards in 955.

== Sources ==
- Minorsky, Vladimir (1977) [1953]. Studies in Caucasian History. Cambridge: Cambridge University Press. ISBN 0-521-05735-3.
- Peacock, Andrew (2011). "SHADDADIDS". Encyclopædia Iranica, Online Edition.
- Ter-Ghewondyan, Aram (1976) [1965]. The Arab Emirates in Bagratid Armenia. Translated by Garsoïan, Nina. Lisbon: Livraria Bertrand.
