= Anushirvan ibn Lashkari =

Shaddadid emir c. 1049

- Reign: 1049
- Predecessor: Lashkari ibn Musa
- Successor: Abu'l-Aswar Shavur ibn Fadl
- Dynasty: Shaddadids

Anushirvan ibn Lashkari was the son and successor of Lashkari ibn Musa and briefly the seventh emir of the Shaddadids at Ganja in 1049.

== Life ==
Anushirvan was the second son of Lashkari ibn Musa, probably by his first wife, along with three other brothers. Lashkari ruled Arran for fifteen years in what is described by the Ottoman historian Münejjim Bashi as a troubled reign.

When he died in 1049, Anushirvan succeeded him, but he was still underage, and real power lay with the chamberlain (hajib) Abu Mansur, who served as regent. The new regime was quickly opposed by a large faction among the populace. Münejjim Bashi, summarizing a now lost local chronicle, reports that this was because Abu Mansur immediately agreed to surrender several frontier fortresses to the Kakhetians, the Georgians and Byzantines, in order "to restrain their greed for Arran". This decision provoked the leading men to revolt under the leadership of al-Haytham ibn Maymun al-Bais, chief of the tanners in Shamkur. According to Vladimir Minorsky, this movement represented an uprising of the town notables against the senior bureaucratic caste. Abu Mansur, then residing at Shamkur, attempted to arrest al-Haytham, but al-Haytham and his ghilman (servants) "drew their daggers" and declared for Anushirvan's great-uncle Abu'l-Aswar, ruler of Dvin.

Abu'l-Aswar occupied Shamkur, settled the troubled situation there, and went on to take up his residence in the capital, Ganja. He arrested Anushirvan, whose reign ended abruptly after two months, as well as Abu Mansur and his relations. Abu'l-Aswar's long reign (1049–67) would prove to be the zenith of the Shaddadids.

== Sources ==
- Minorsky, Vladimir (1977) [1953]. Studies in Caucasian History. Cambridge: Cambridge University Press. ISBN 0-521-05735-3.
- Peacock, Andrew (2011). "SHADDADIDS". Encyclopædia Iranica, Online Edition.

Preceded by Lashkari ibn Musa	Shaddadid emir of Ganja; 1049	Succeeded by Abu'l-Aswar Shavur ibn Fadl
