= Abu'l-Fath Musa =

Shaddadid emir from 1031 to 1034

- Reign: 1031–1034
- Predecessor: al-Fadhl ibn Muhammad
- Successor: Lashkari ibn Musa

Abu'l-Fath Musa succeeded his father al-Fadhl ibn Muhammad to the throne of the Shaddadids in 1031, reigning until his murder by his son and successor Lashkari in 1034. He Defeated the Kievan Rus that attacked Baku during his reign.

== Sources ==
- Minorsky, Vladimir (1977) [1953]. Studies in Caucasian History. Cambridge: Cambridge University Press. ISBN 0-521-05735-3.
- Peacock, Andrew (2011). "Shaddadids". Encyclopædia Iranica, Online Edition.

Preceded by Fadl ibn Muhammad	Shaddadid emir of Ganja; 1031–1034	Succeeded by Lashkari ibn Musa
