= Fadl ibn Shavur =

Shaddadid emir from 1067 to 1073

Fadl II
- Reign: 1067–1073
- Predecessor: Abu'l-Aswar Shavur ibn Fadl
- Successor: Ashot bin Shavur I
- Died: 1073
- Dynasty: Shaddadids

Al-Fadl ibn Shavur or Fadl II was the ninth ruler of the Shaddadids, from 1067 to 1073. He was the son and successor of Abu'l-Aswar Shavur ibn Fadl. On the other hand, Fadl II was a cousin of Kiurike, being the son of his aunt.

== Sources ==
- Bosworth, C. E. (1968). "The Political and Dynastic History of the Iranian World (A.D. 1000–1217)". In Boyle, John Andrew (ed.). The Cambridge History of Iran: The Saljuq and Mongol Periods. Vol. 5. Cambridge: Cambridge University Press. pp. 1–202. ISBN 0-521-06936-X.
- Minorsky, Vladimir (1958). A History of Sharvān and Darband in the 10th-11th Centuries. Cambridge: W. Heffer and Sons. OCLC 5042566.
