= Ashot ibn Shavur =

Shaddadid prince

- Reign: August 1068 – April 1069
- Predecessor: Fadl ibn Shavur
- Successor: Fadl ibn Shavur
- Dynasty: Shaddadids
- Father: Abu'l-Aswar Shavur ibn Fadl

Ashot ibn Abu'l-Aswar Shavur ibn Fadl was a Shaddadid prince, the second son of Abu'l-Aswar Shavur ibn Fadl. During the captivity of his older brother Fadl ibn Shavur by the Georgians in 1068, he ruled in his stead as emir of Arran for eight months (August 1068 – April 1069), even minting coins in his own name and that of his overlord, the Seljuk Sultan Alp Arslan.

== Sources ==
- Minorsky, Vladimir (1977) [1953]. Studies in Caucasian History. Cambridge: Cambridge University Press. ISBN 0-521-05735-3.
- Peacock, Andrew (2011). "SHADDADIDS". Encyclopædia Iranica, Online Edition.
