= Lashkari ibn Muhammad =

Shaddadid ruler of Ganja

- Reign: 971–978
- Successor: Marzuban ibn Muhammad
- Died: 978
- House: Shaddadids
- Father: Muhammad ibn Shaddad

Lashkari ibn Muhammad ibn Shaddad was a Kurdish ruler, the son of Muhammad ibn Shaddad who succeeded his father to the throne of the Shaddadids in 971. Along with his brothers, he captured Ganja from the Sallarids in 971, coming into control of the region of Arran. After his death in 978, he was succeeded by his brother Marzuban ibn Muhammad.

In 971/972, after the failed Sallārid attempt to capture Ganja in 971, Ibrāhīm ibn Marzūbān renewed the siege against the Shaddadids. The Sallārids again failed to take the city, and Ibrāhīm was forced to withdraw after concluding a peace which effectively recognized the independence of the Shaddadid dynasty.

== Sources ==
- Minorsky, Vladimir (1977) [1953]. Studies in Caucasian History. Cambridge: Cambridge University Press. ISBN 0-521-05735-3.
- Peacock, Andrew (2011). "SHADDADIDS". Encyclopædia Iranica, Online Edition.

New title	Shaddadid emir of Ganja; 971–978	Succeeded by Marzuban ibn Muhammad
