= Amberd =

Fortress ruins in the province of Aragatsotn, Armenia

- Aragatsotn Province, Armenia
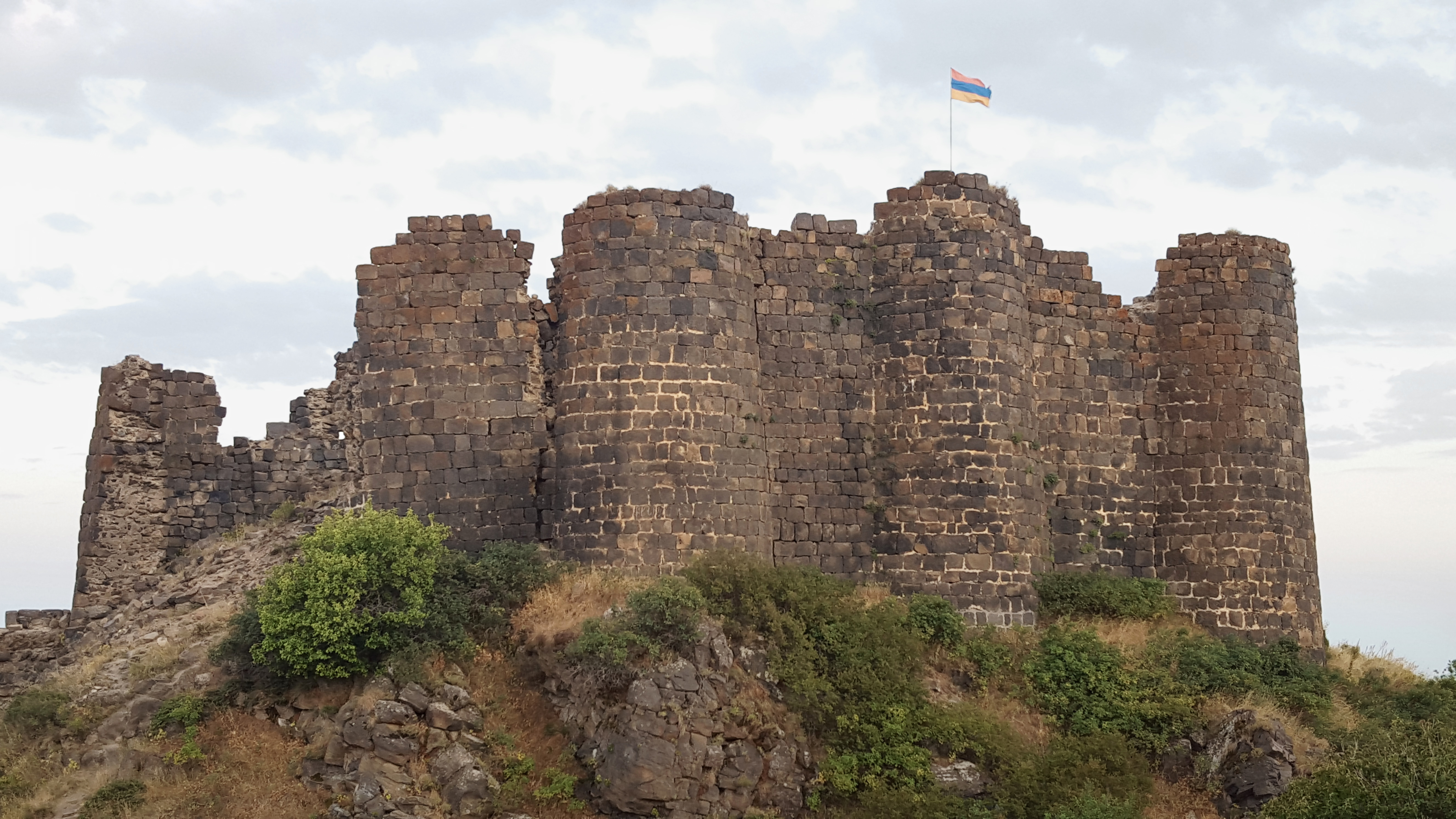
- The fortress of Amberd

Site information
- Type: Fortress
- Open to the public: Yes
- Condition: A large portion of the fortification walls, bath house and church remain intact.

Location
- Shown within Armenia
- Location within Armenia Location within Aragatsotn
- Coordinates: 40.3886°N 44.2264°E

Site history
- Built by: Kamsarakan family
- In use: Site: Since the Stone Age; Fortress: From the 7th to 13th centuries
- Demolished: 1236 by the Mongols

Amberd (Armenian: Ամբերդ) is a 10th-century fortress located 2,300 meters (7,500 ft) above sea level, on the slopes of Mount Aragats at the confluence of the Arkashen and Amberd rivers in the province of Aragatsotn, Armenia. The name translates to "fortress in the clouds" in Armenian. It is also the name incorrectly attributed to Vahramashen Church, the 11th-century Armenian church near the castle. The village of Byurakan is 6.4 kilometres (4.0 mi) from the site of Amberd.

In 2024, the pan-European Federation for Cultural Heritage Europa Nostra included Amberd, a medieval fortress, in the list of the 7 most endangered European monuments and heritage sites. The buildings of the complex may collapse due to age, lack of funding for reinforcing the structures, and because of erosion and earthquakes.

== History ==
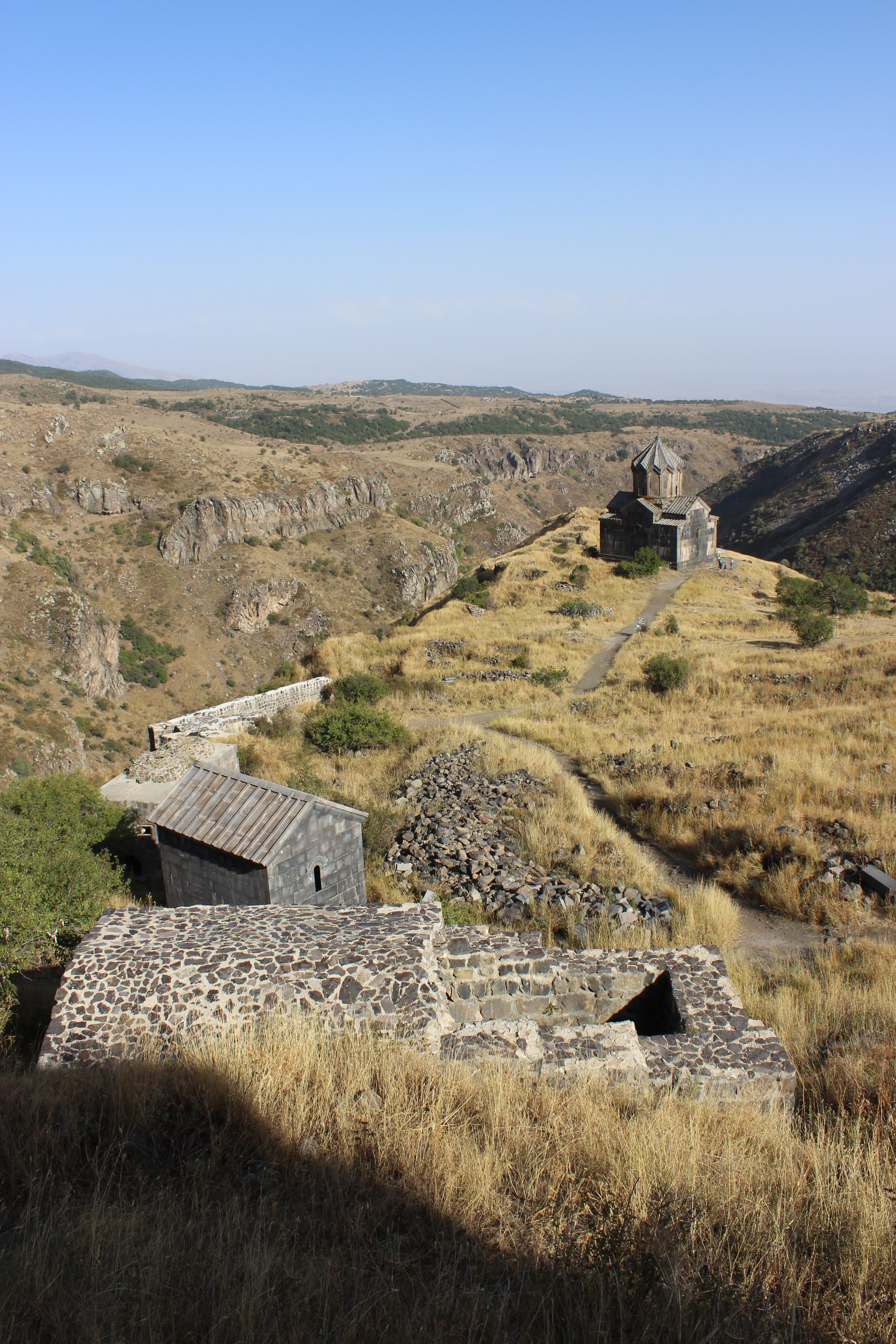
Amberd Fortress' service buildings and Vahramashen Church (c. 1026).

The site started as a Stone Age settlement. During the Bronze Age and Urartian periods, a fortress had been built that is now obsolete. Some sources say that Amberd used to be a summer residence for kings. The castle of Amberd and some sections of walls were constructed in the 7th century as a possession of the noble House of Kamsarakan.

Four centuries later the fortress and surrounding lands were purchased by the House of Pahlavuni and rebuilt by Prince Vahram Pahlavouni, as is recorded in the manuscripts of Grigor Magistros Pahlavuni. Vahram built the Church of Surb Astvatsatsin in 1026, fortified the complex with thicker stone walls, and added three bastions along the ridge of the Arkhashen canyon. Despite being unusual for a military installation, a bath house was built in the same period and has remained moderately intact along with the water supply system.

Under Zakarian control during the 12th and 13th centuries, the walls were structurally reinforced and the castle and outer buildings were renovated.

The noble Vache I Vachutian purchased Amberd in 1215, making it a key defensive site in the region. Within a short period of time, the Mongols captured and destroyed the fortress in the year 1236. The site remained abandoned and untouched until the 20th century, when reconstruction and archaeological excavations began.

== Architecture ==
=== Fortress ===
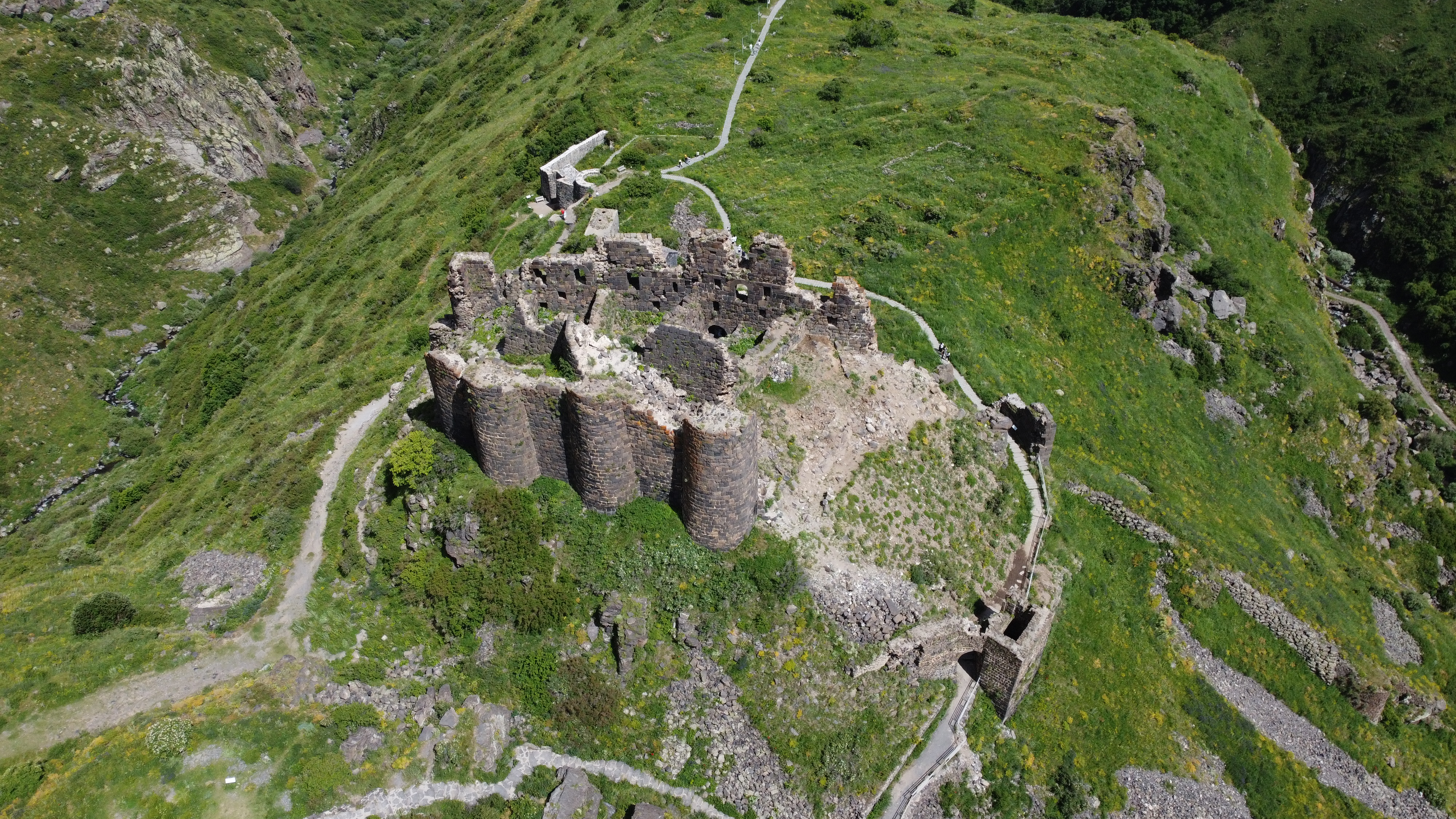
An aerial view of fortress

The castle ruins of Amberd comprised an area of 1,500 square metres (16,000 ft^{2}). Its walls are constructed of roughly hewn basalt blocks set in place with mortar. Tower walls are inclined to have made it easier to fire on invaders below. The interior of the castle had three-stories, each floor separated from one another by wood planks clinched on logs. There were five rooms in the first and second floor, each arranged in a row where one would enter each room through the previous room. An irregularly shaped hallway was separate from the three internal rooms by an internal wall.

On the third floor were the reception areas and private rooms for its royal inhabitants. The structural configuration is thought to have not changed since it was first built in the 10th century. Excavations have shown that the interior of the castle and rooms were quite lavish with elegantly carved decorations in the rooms, oil lamps, incense holders, and walls decorated with silks and brocades, and with bronze, gold and silver ornamentation.

=== Water supply ===
At Amberd, a constant water supply was crucial for its inhabitants. The fortress' primary viaduct was a terra cotta pipeline that had been laid 4 to 5 kilometres (2.5 to 3.1 mi) from the fortress to dammed reservoirs which collected sources of spring water from higher elevations and melting snow. In the event that the fortress was under attack, it was likely that the pipeline would be destroyed. Therefore, another more secret water supply would need to ensure a constant flow of water to its inhabitants to keep them from dying from thirst. A covered passageway that led from the fortifications along a steep pathway descending down a cleft in the rocks to the Arkashen River performed such a task.

=== Bath house ===
The bath house south of the fortress was built between the 10th and 11th centuries. Its twin bathing rooms each with a single dome are still moderately intact. At one time it had used hypocaust heating as had originated in Roman times, to heat the floors. Pipes that ran through the floors and walls of the structure were heated by a fire built under the floor, which then forced the heat throughout the bathing rooms. Metal pipes supplied hot water to the baths.

Chronological History

900-920 AD - The Arabs, during one of their periodic invasions, conquer and lay waste the town of Byurakan, 6 or 7 km from Amberd, but historian Hovhannes Draskhanakerttsi in his account of the event says nothing of Amberd. No other Armenian historian mention it until at least the year 1000.

900-1000 - Ashot II Yerkat (of iron) Bagratuni begins liberating the country from Arabs, and conquers back old fortresses, restoring them and building additional new ones to complete country's defense system. An ever increasing scarcity of soldiers and organized armies, makes a series of fortified strongholds indispensable.

900-1100 - In the wake of these new structures completed by the Bagratuni dynasty, originators of the defense system to the East, popular tradition attributes the construction of Amberd to the king, Ashot II Yerkat: a national hero. During the long period from 900-1100, works are carried out to restore Amberd's eastern entrance and fortify all of it, as previously it was only an unfortified summer residence.

1020 - Gagik I Bagratuni dies and divides his kingdom among his three sons: Hovhannes-Smbat, Abas and Ashot. The first-born Hovhannes-Smbat receives the crown of Ani, the possession of the Ararat Plain, all the region of Shirak, and Amberd.

1026 - The Pahlavuni dynasty the most important noble family in the court of Bagratuni kings is given Amberd. It is their duty to make the necessary military commitments for the country's defense. Vahram Pahlavouni inaugurates the castle church in this years, as the inscription on its facade testifies. From this date onward Amberd becomes the most important center in the defensive system of the Shirak region, and the kingdom of Ani.

1040 - At approximately this time, Vahram Pahlavouni rebuilds walls of the fortress which remains in his hands until his death.

1040-1050 - Before the death of Vahram Pahlavouni, Sargis Vardapet visits Grigor Magistros Pahlanuni who is at Amberd on an assignment for the king, Gagik II.

1045 - An event with important consequences of Armenia takes place in Constantinople. The Byzantine emperor Constantine IX Monomachos calls the king Gagik II and forces him to hand over the city of Ani.

1045 - Vahram Pahlavouni and his son Grigor fall in battle at the foot of Dvin.

1050 - Katakalon Kekaumenos and General Konstantin take possession of fortresses belonging to Gagik II, which had been captured by the Emir Shaddadiyan, in one of the many Turkish raids. The fortresses are: Sourb-Mari (Sourmair or Sourmalou), Ampier (Amberd), Sourb Grigor (perhaps near Parpi) and Khelidonion (Tsitsernakaberd).

1050 - The Byzantine emperor Constantine IX Monomachos names Katakalon Kekaumenos governor of Ani and promotes the eunuch Konstantin to general of Byzantine armies in the Orient.

1064 - The fortress of Amberd is partially destroyed and reconquered together with provinces of Ayrarat, Lori and Syunik by the Seljuk king Alp Arslan, during the fourth invasion of Armenia.

1196 - The brothers Ivane and Zakare liberate Amberd and the cities of Ani, Bjni, Marand and Tabriz from Seljuk domination: an inscription in the monastery of Haghartsin commemorates the event. After such incidents, the archbishop's see of the region is moved from Byurakan to Amberd which offers better defense system.

1100-1200 during the entire century, the Zakarian family, the liberators of the region, restore and complete the fortress.

1200 - The heroic liberation of Amberd by Zakare Sipahsalar general of Georgian and Armenian armies is commemorated by a khachkar in the Norashen church at Iraklou.

1215 - One of the most important feudatories, Vache, and father of Prince Kurd Vachutian, buys the fortress of Amberd from Ivane Zakarian. The event is commemorated by an inscription in the Saghmosavank monastery. Later Prince Vache, the son of Vache Vachutian is nominated the governor of the Aragatsotn Province and Amberd by Zakare Sipahsalar.

1236 - The fortress is conquered by the Mongols and nearly demolished.

1250-1300 - The sons of Prince Kurd, Davit, Vache, Tayir, and Hasan govern the region which during this period. Vachutians rebuilt the fortress and made it the residence of the Vachutian family, whereas the religious authorities are housed in Hovhannavank monastery.

1254 - The Vachutian princes, well protected by their own defense system, not only succeed in remaining independent during the Mongolian occupation, but carry out an autonomous policy of friendship and allegiances as well. In 1254 the king of Armenian Cilicia, Hethum, stops at Amberd as guest of Kurd II Vachutian on his way to the court of the Mongolian Khan to sign a pact of alliance with him.

1335 - A manuscript describes the heroic enterprise of Prince Kurd, son of Tayir and grandson of Kurd, who acts as a bulwark against the enemy invasions and succeeds in making the region prosper in peace.

1338 - In an inscription in both church of Karbi and the Hovhannavank monastery Theodoros Chrkin, son of Prince Kurd, is commemorated.

1300-1350 - Neither codices nor inscriptions speak of the Vachutian family, who seem to have disappeared from the pagers of history. The fortress is abandoned, and falls into progressive ruin although in case of danger it is still a periodic refuge for the inhabitants of the plain.

1600-1700 - The territory has long since passed from the Ottomans to Persians. A quotation from that period however, mentions that Davit Kanakertsi is named governor of provinces of Kote and Amberd by the Persian governor of Yerevan, Amirkiune.

Chronology of the Amberd Excavations

1936 - Excavations are begun with the participation of experts from the Hermitage Museum and the Academy of Sciences of Soviet Armenia, whose director is Joseph Orbeli. During the excavations around the castle, the baths, the secret passage and the chapel, discovery is made of the rooms connected to the baths, the main entrance with a staircase leading to the castle, a water cistern located between the walls, as well as the outer walls of the citadel.

1963 - This second survey is sponsored by the Archaeological and Ethnographic Institute of Soviet Armenia under the direction of N.M. Tokarski. The upper part of the fortress, and the foundations of homes, workshops and service rooms are found. Furthermore, sections of the wall dating back to the Bagratuni and to the successive period of Zakarian are uncovered along the outside of the fortified wall. Tokarski suggested that some parts of the fortress and its walls were built by the Kamsarakan family in the 7th century.

1964 - The excavations Archaeological and Ethnographic Institute of Soviet Armenia continue under S.V. Harutiunian on the south side where it is hoped to find walls from the Urartian period.

1965 - The excavations start again and last until 1968. The northern part of the church, the foundation of buildings from the Bagratuni period, and a plastered building located 100 meters to the north of the church, are brought to light.

1966 - The cleaning of the grounds around the church is completed.

1968 - The oldest entrance to the fortress is discovered north of the church. South of it are found sections of the fortress wall with its connected buildings. Numerous archaeological relics are unearthed.

== Gallery ==
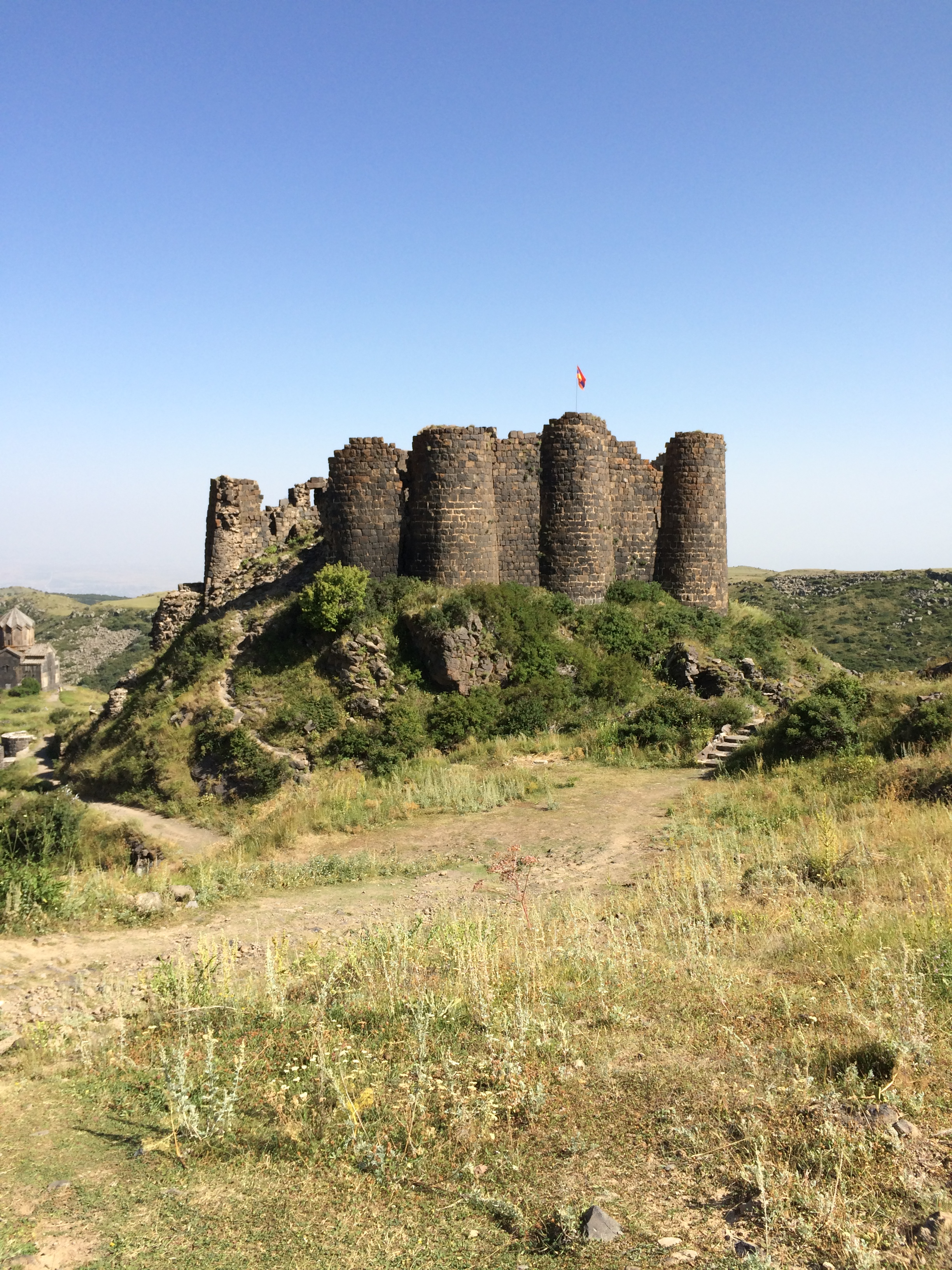
View of remains of Amberd fortress's exterior

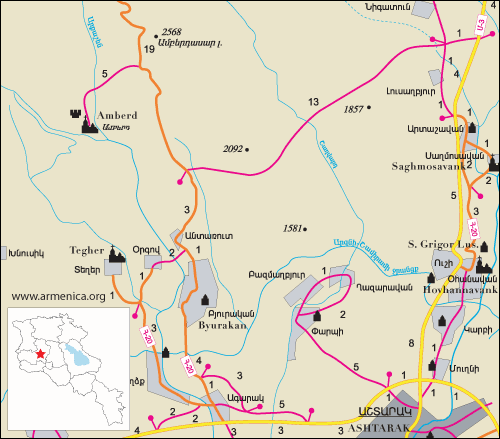
Road map of Amberd and surrounding region

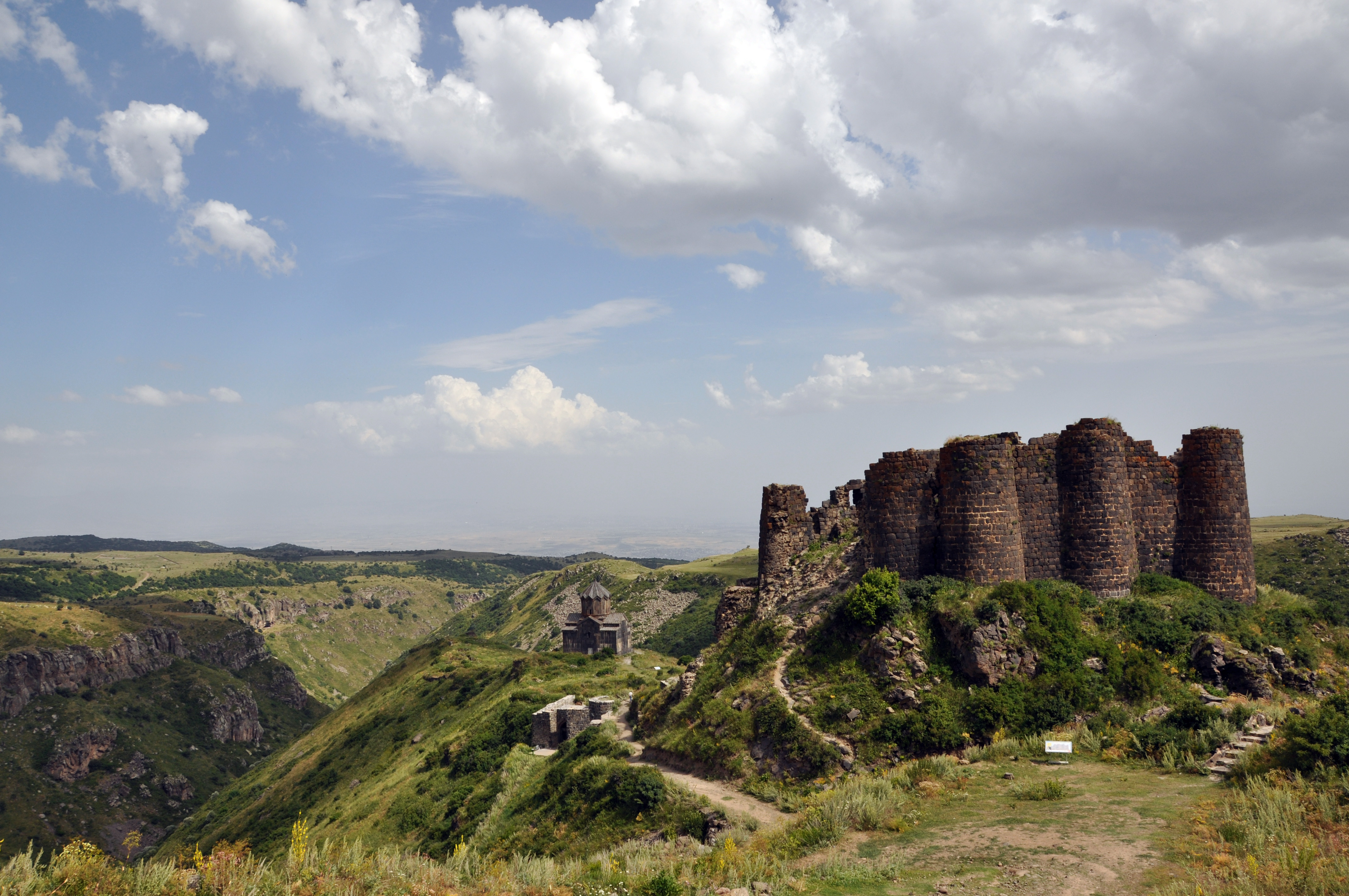
The fortress and the church

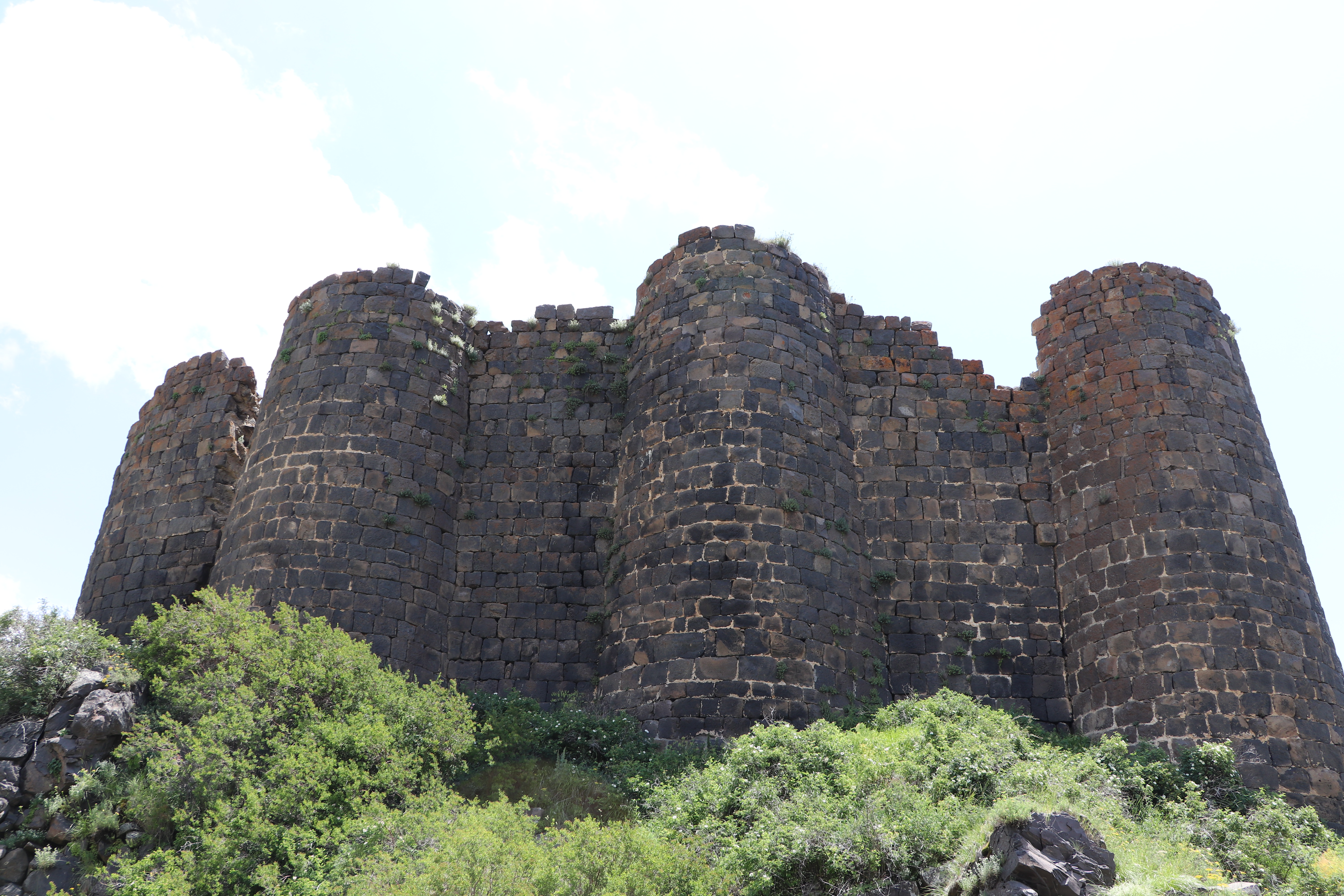

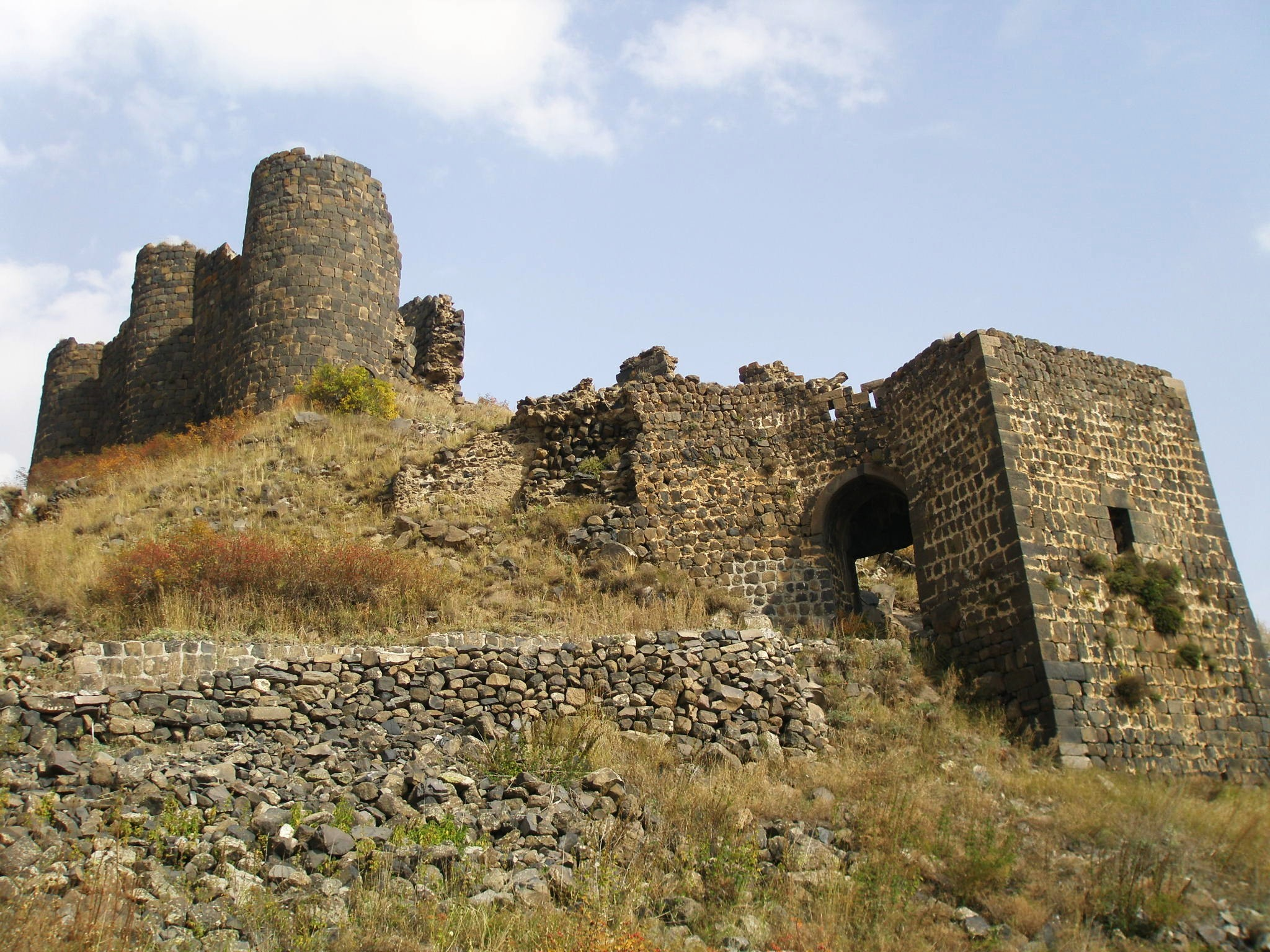
The northwestern gate

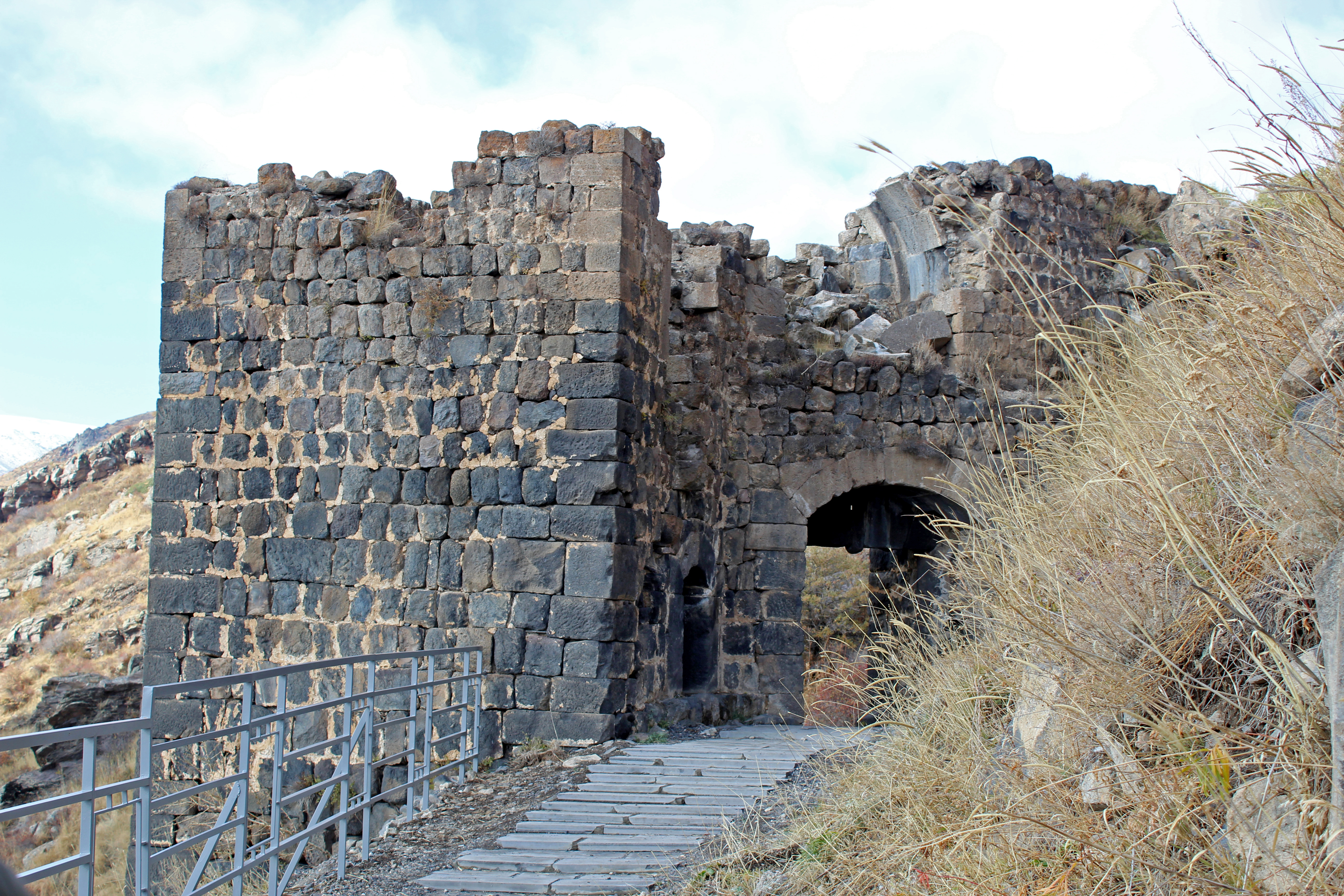

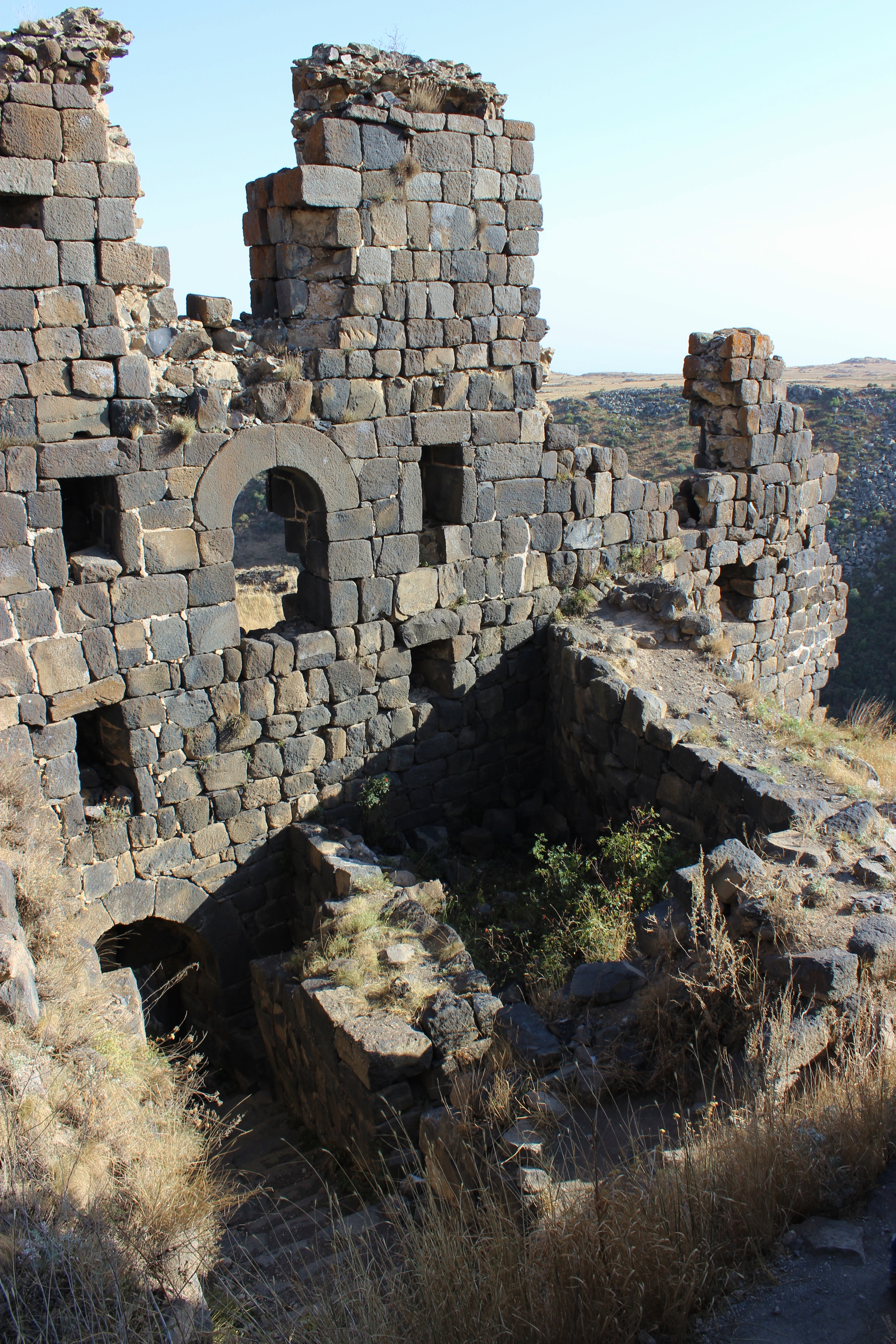
Interior walls of the fortress (main entry lower left)

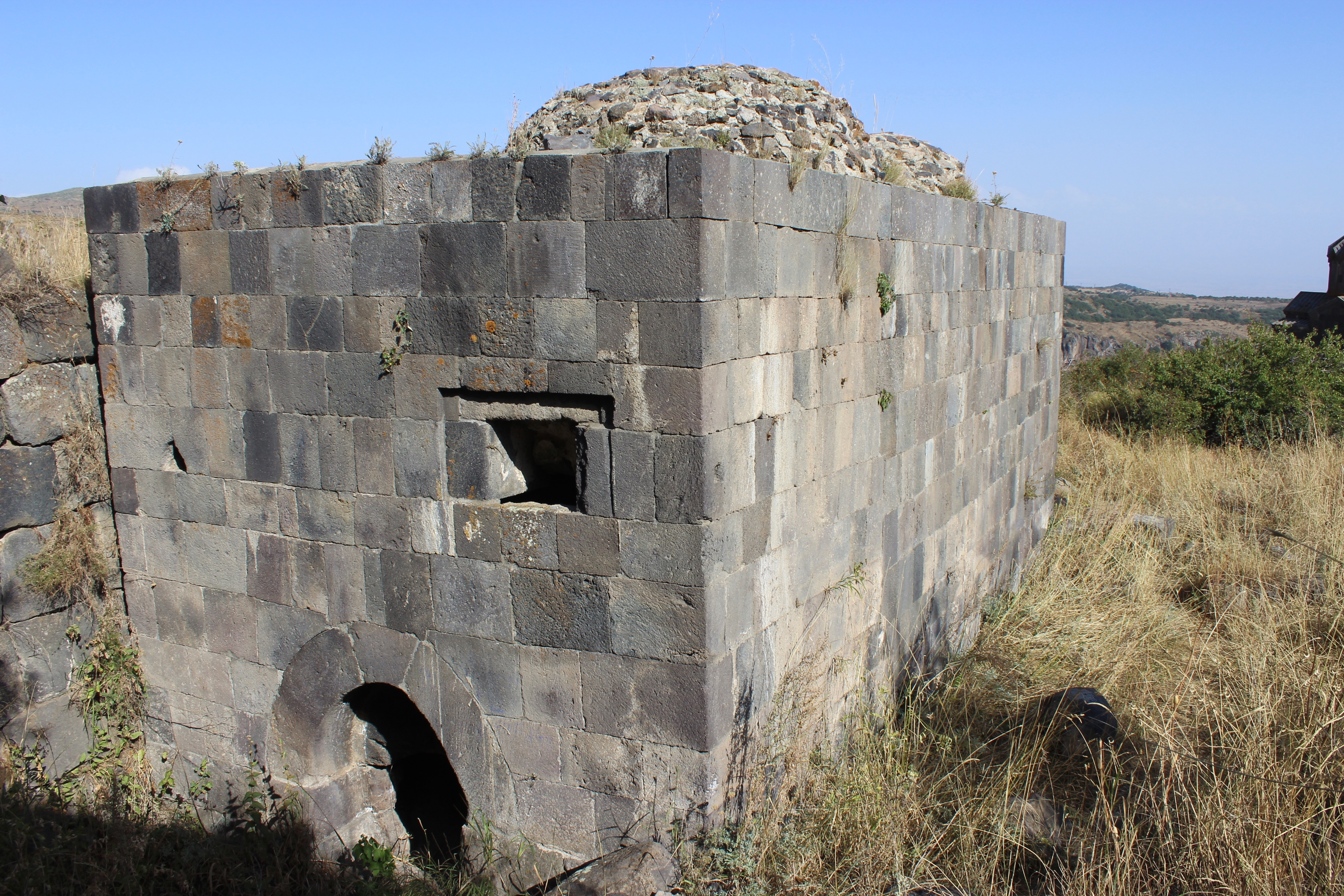
Bath house as seen from the back, with the remains of the two domes on top

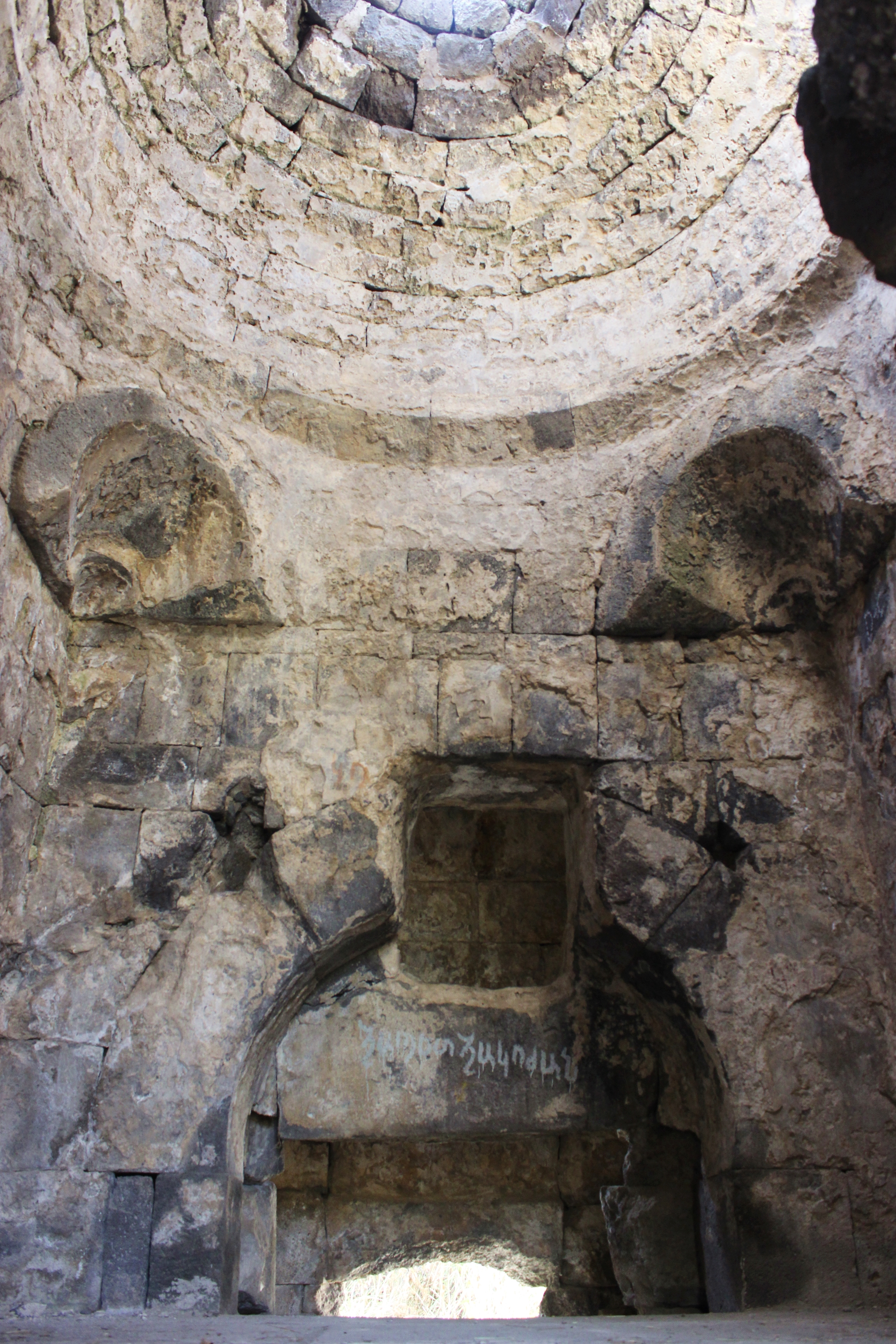
Interior of the 10-11th c. bath house

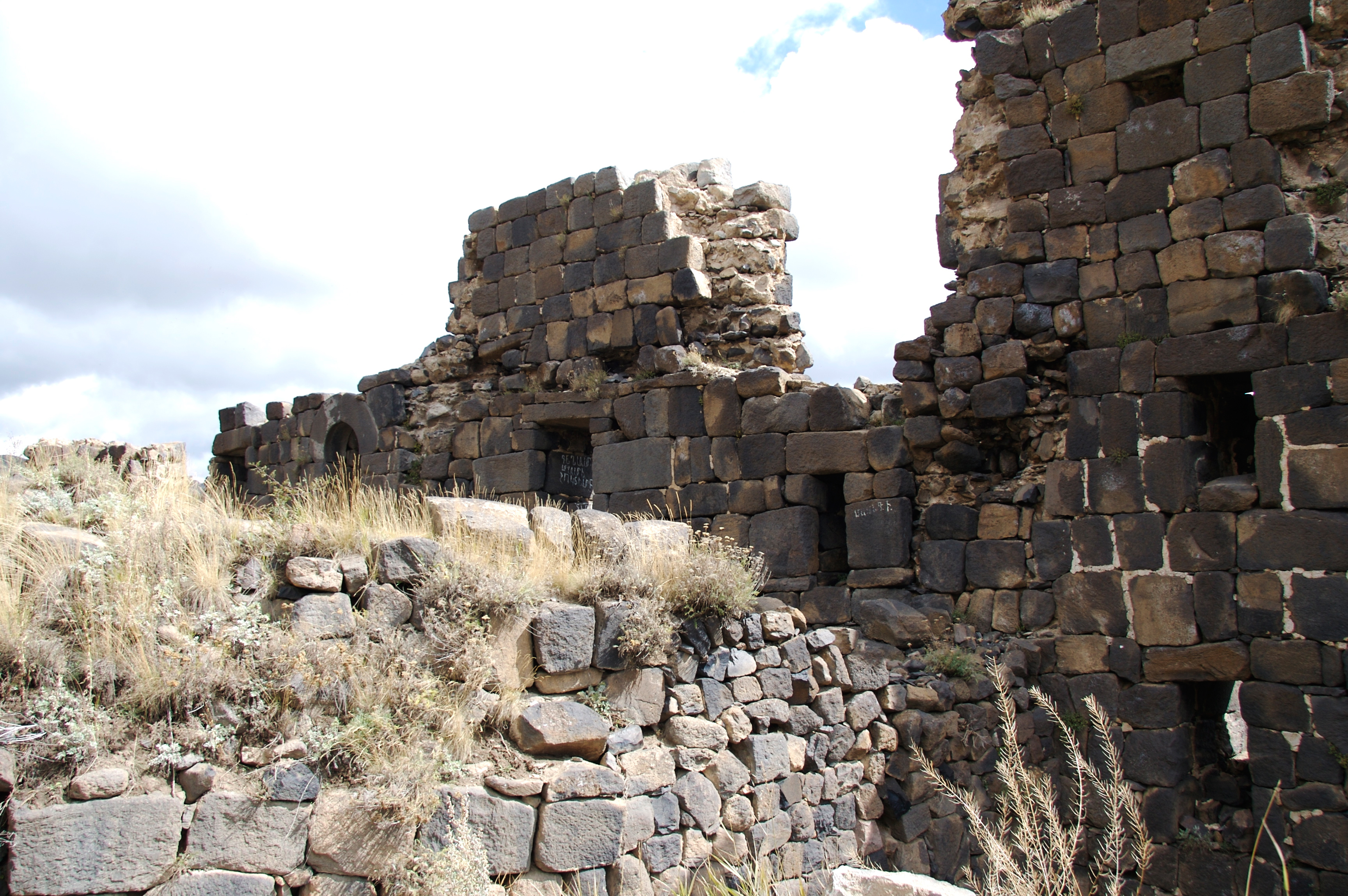
Amberd Ruins

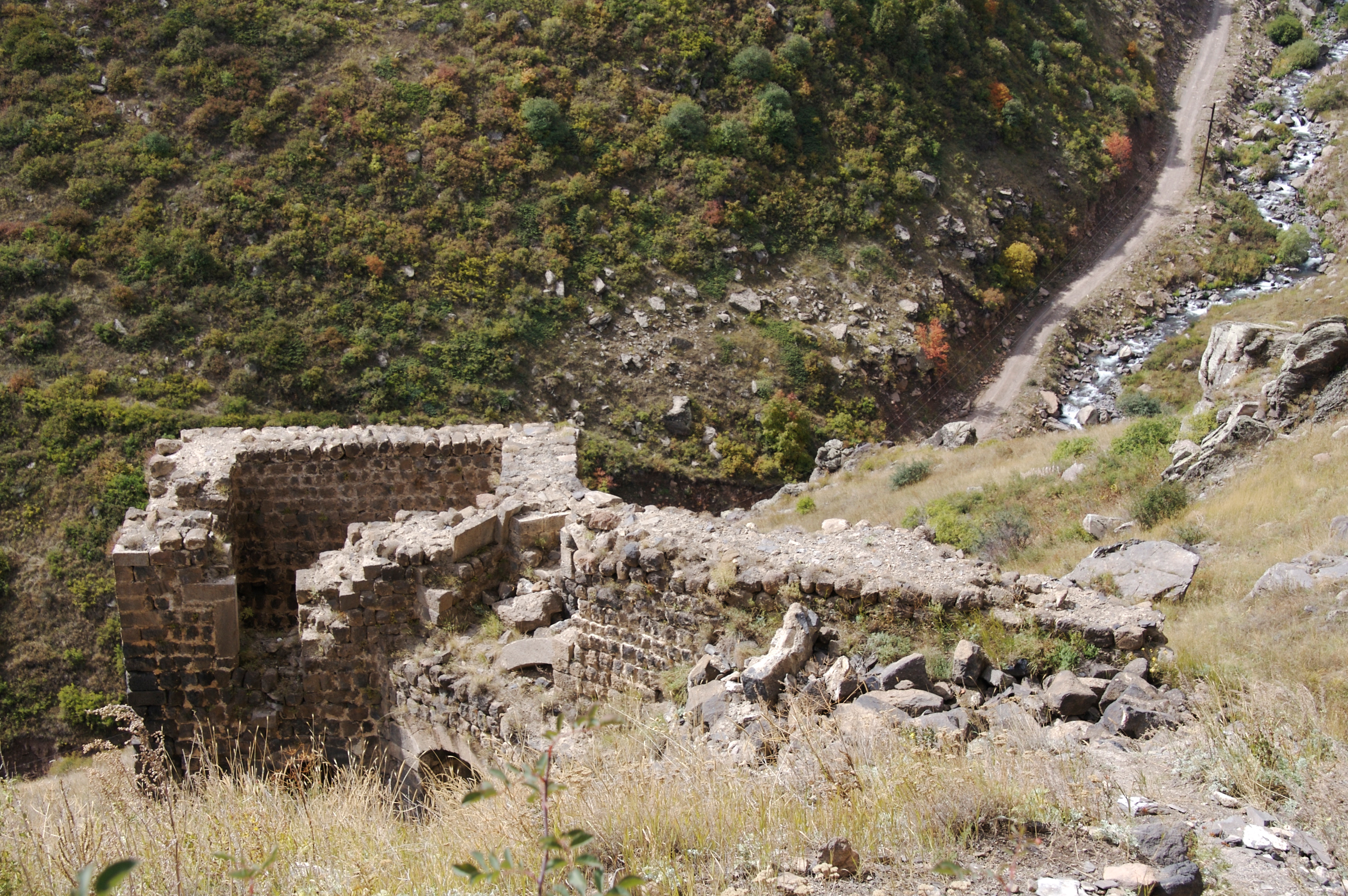
Amberd Ruins

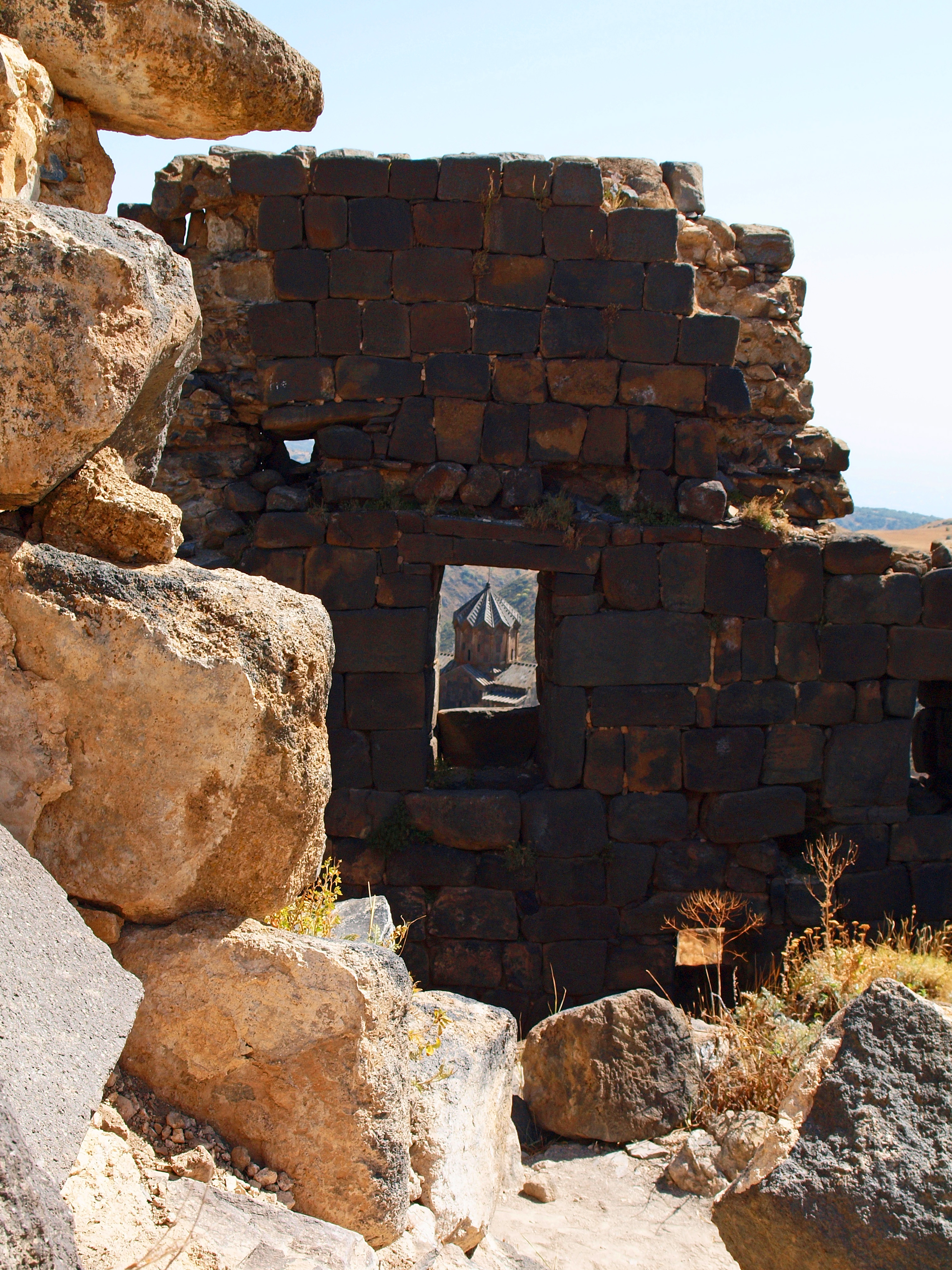
View of Vahramashen from Amberd Ruins

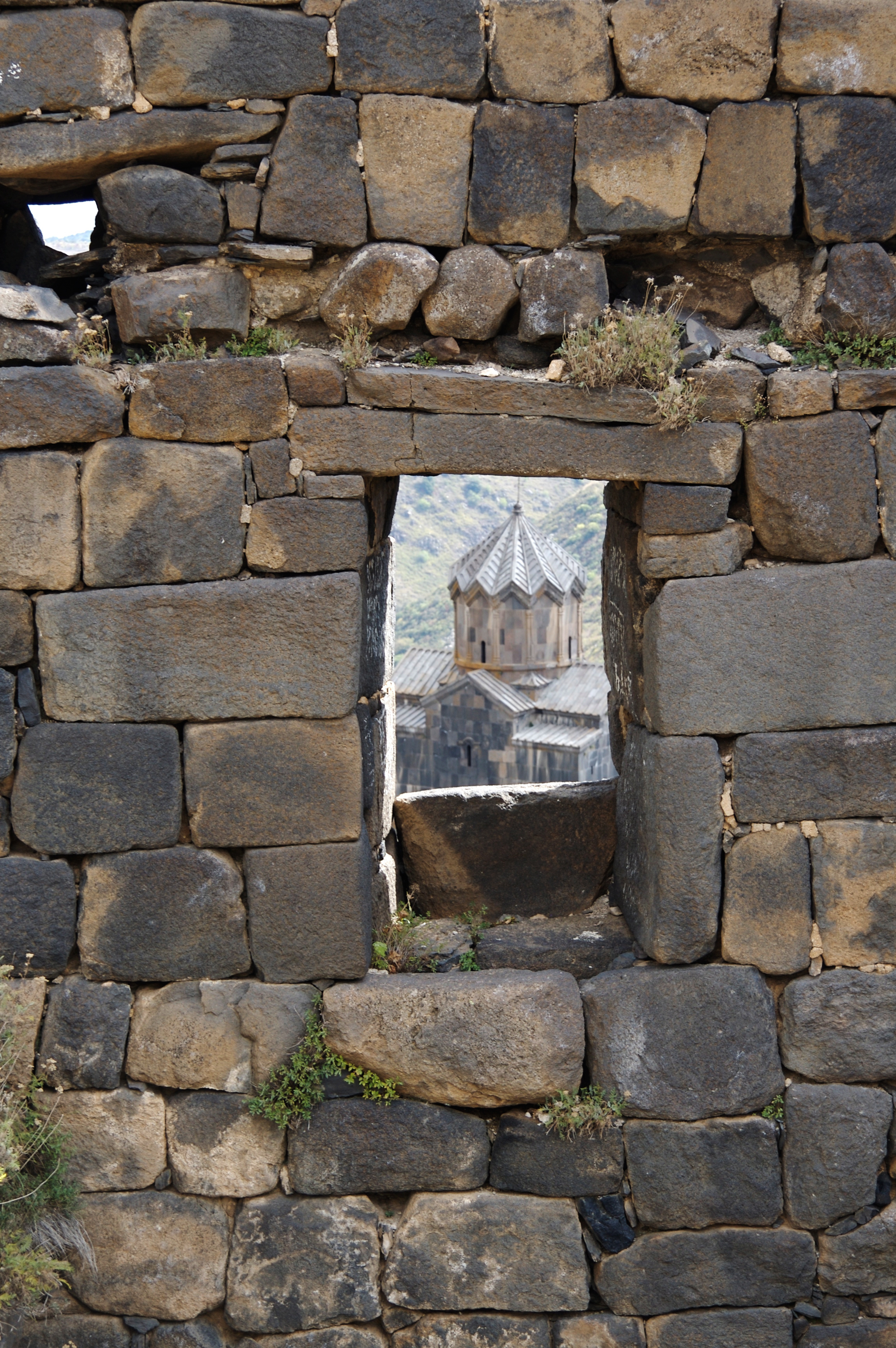
View of Vahramashen from Amberd Ruins

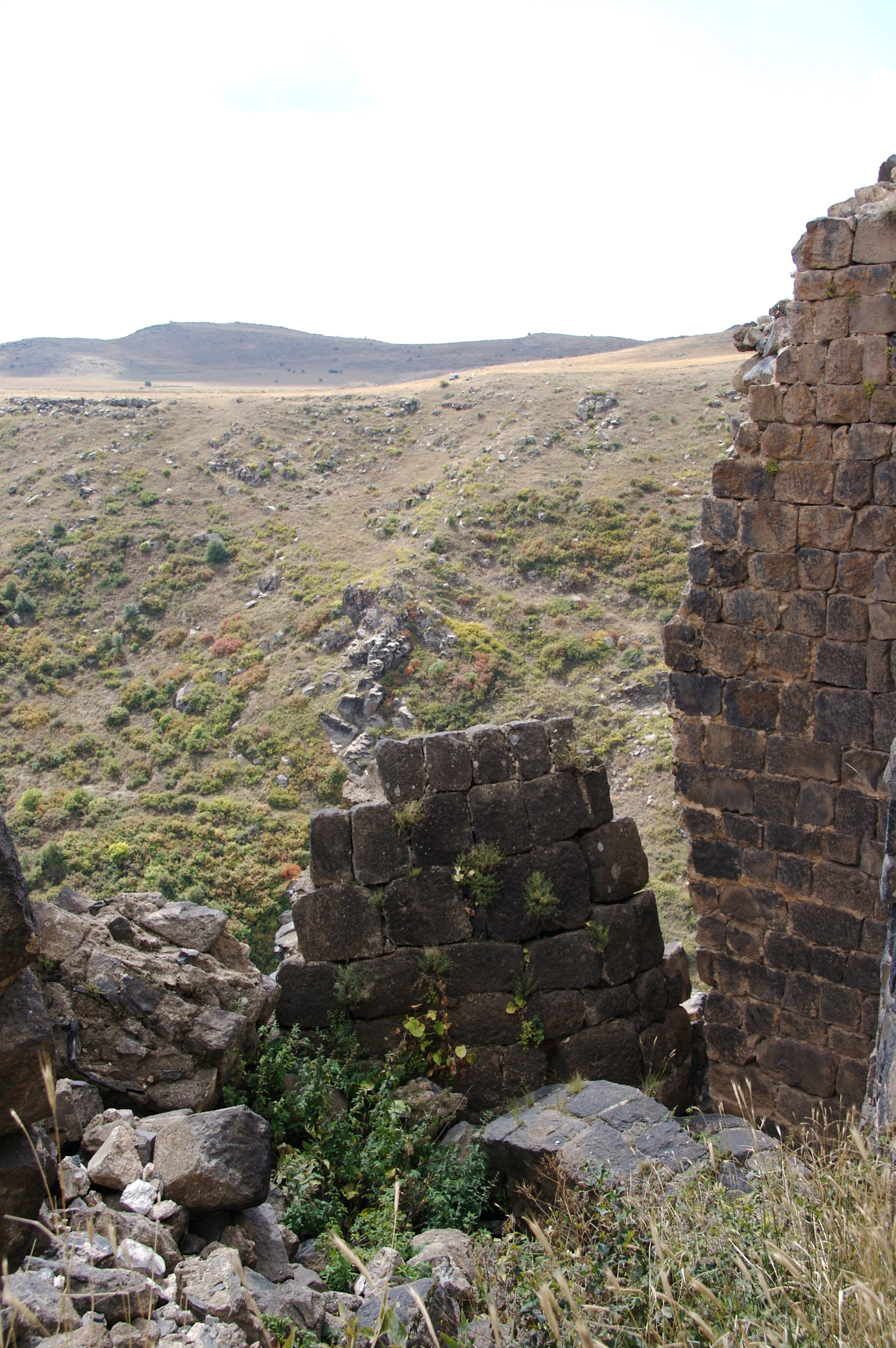
View of countryside from Amberd

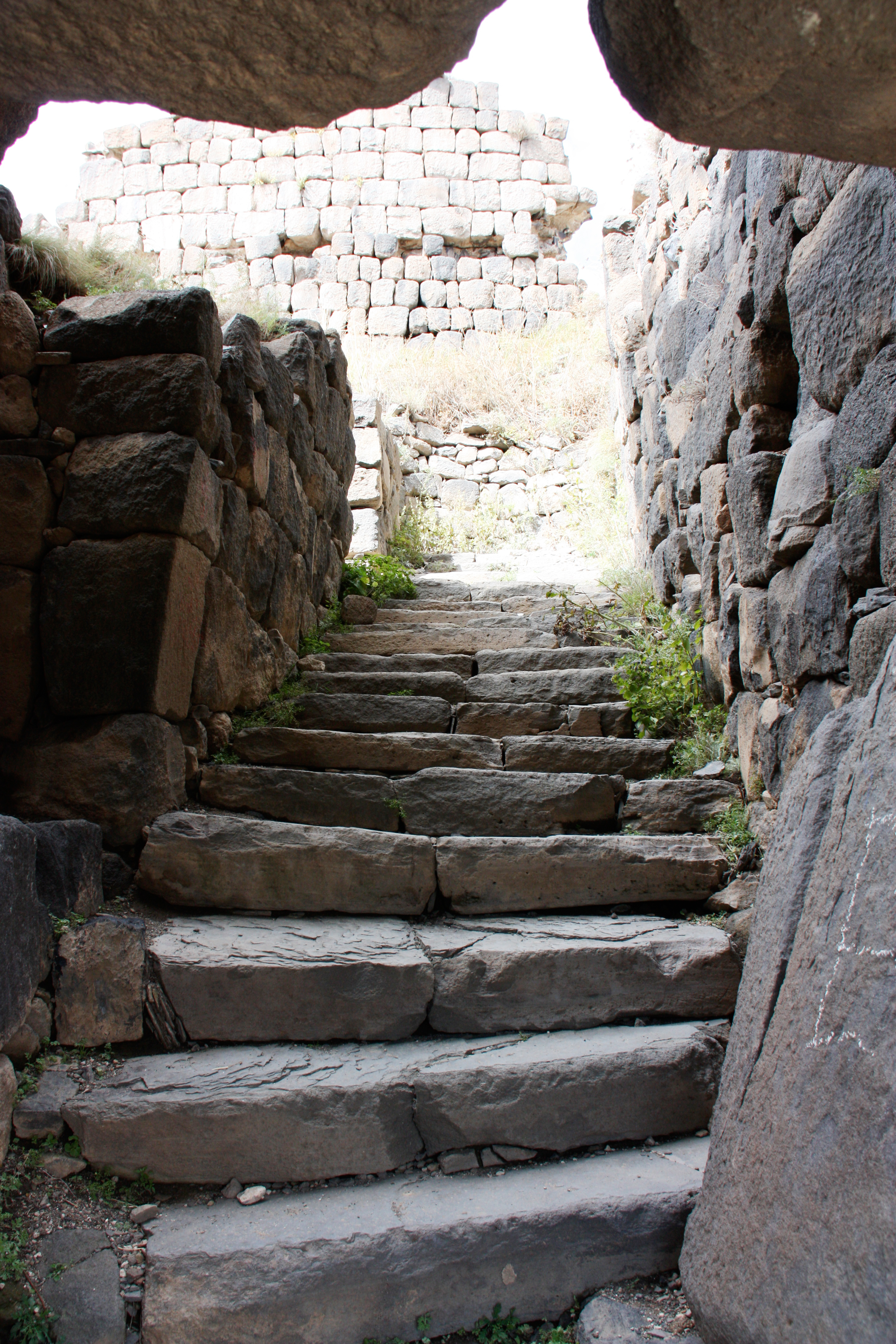
Amberd stairs within ruins

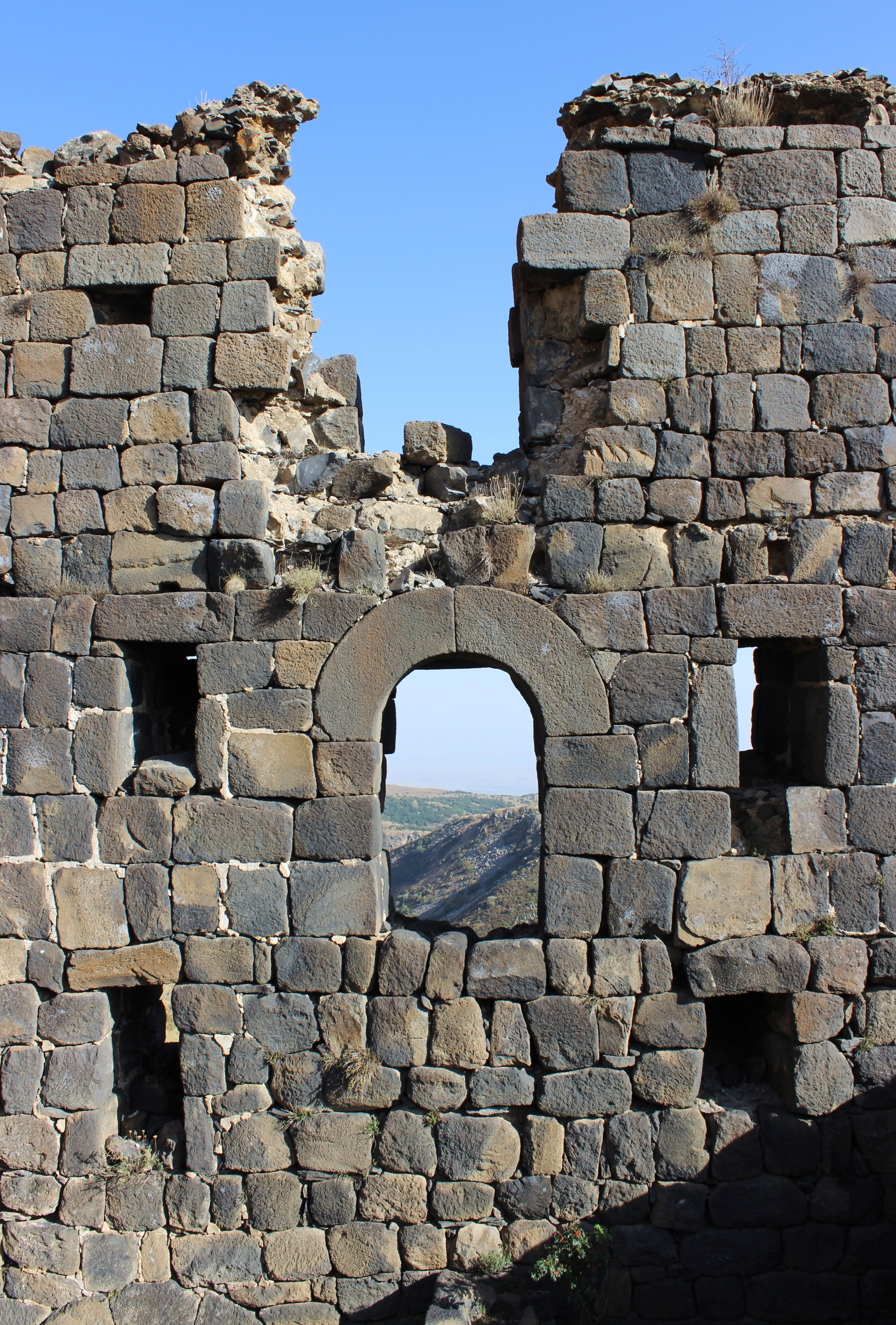
Amberd Fortress Interior Walls

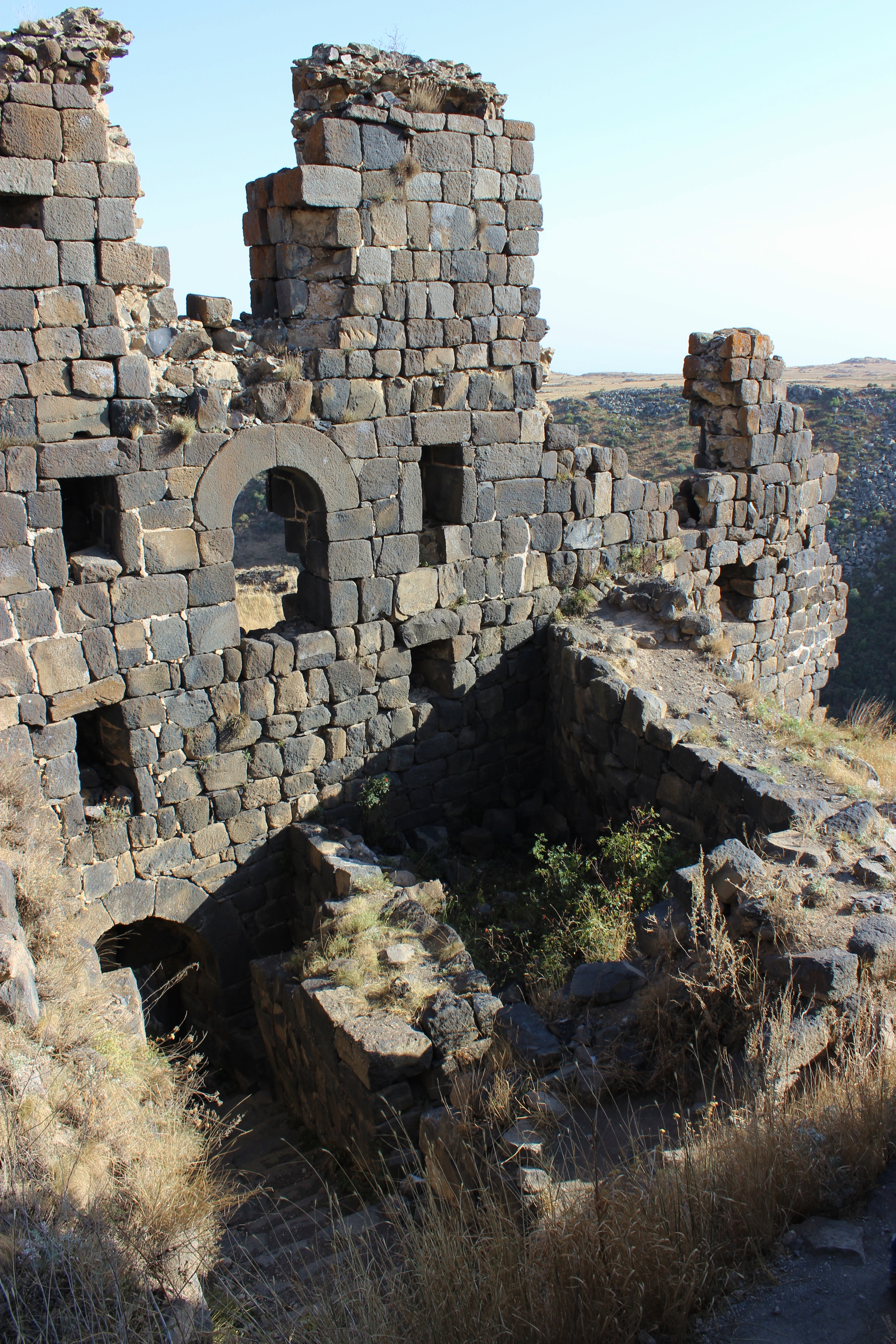
Amberd Fortress Interior Walls

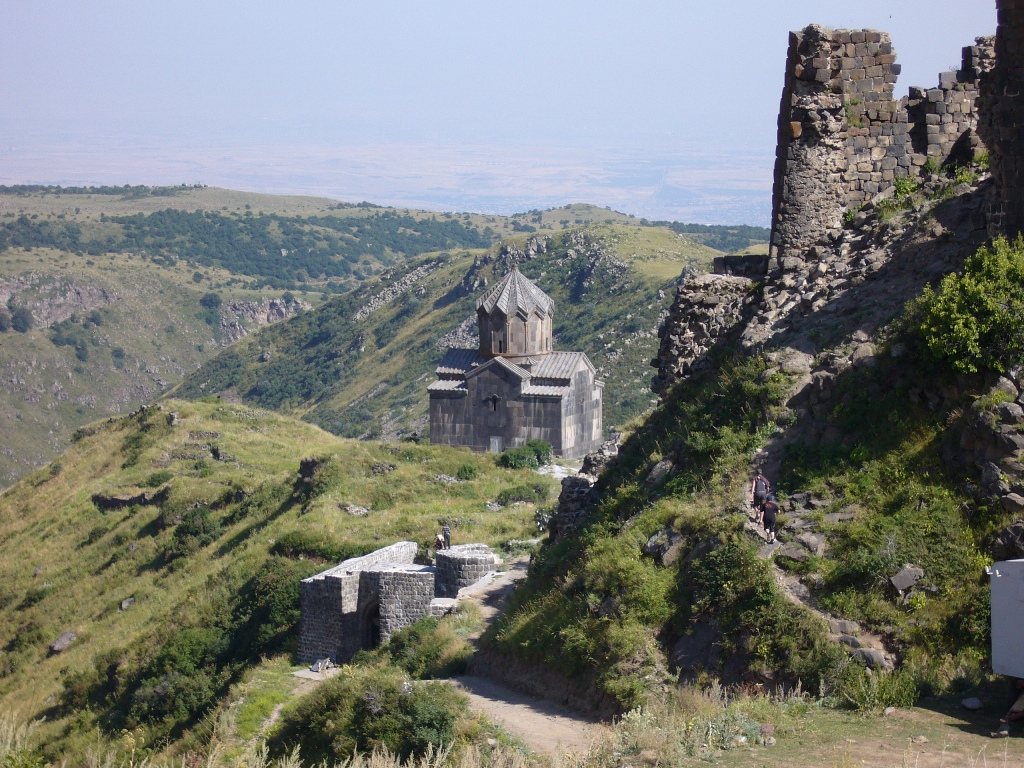
View of Vahramashen from Amberd ruins

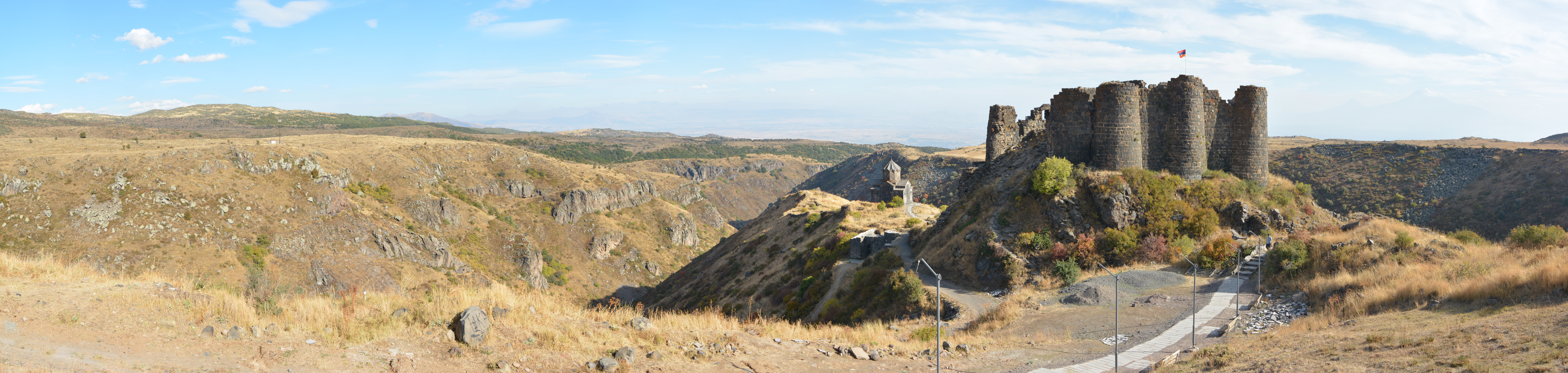
Panoramic View of fortress and church

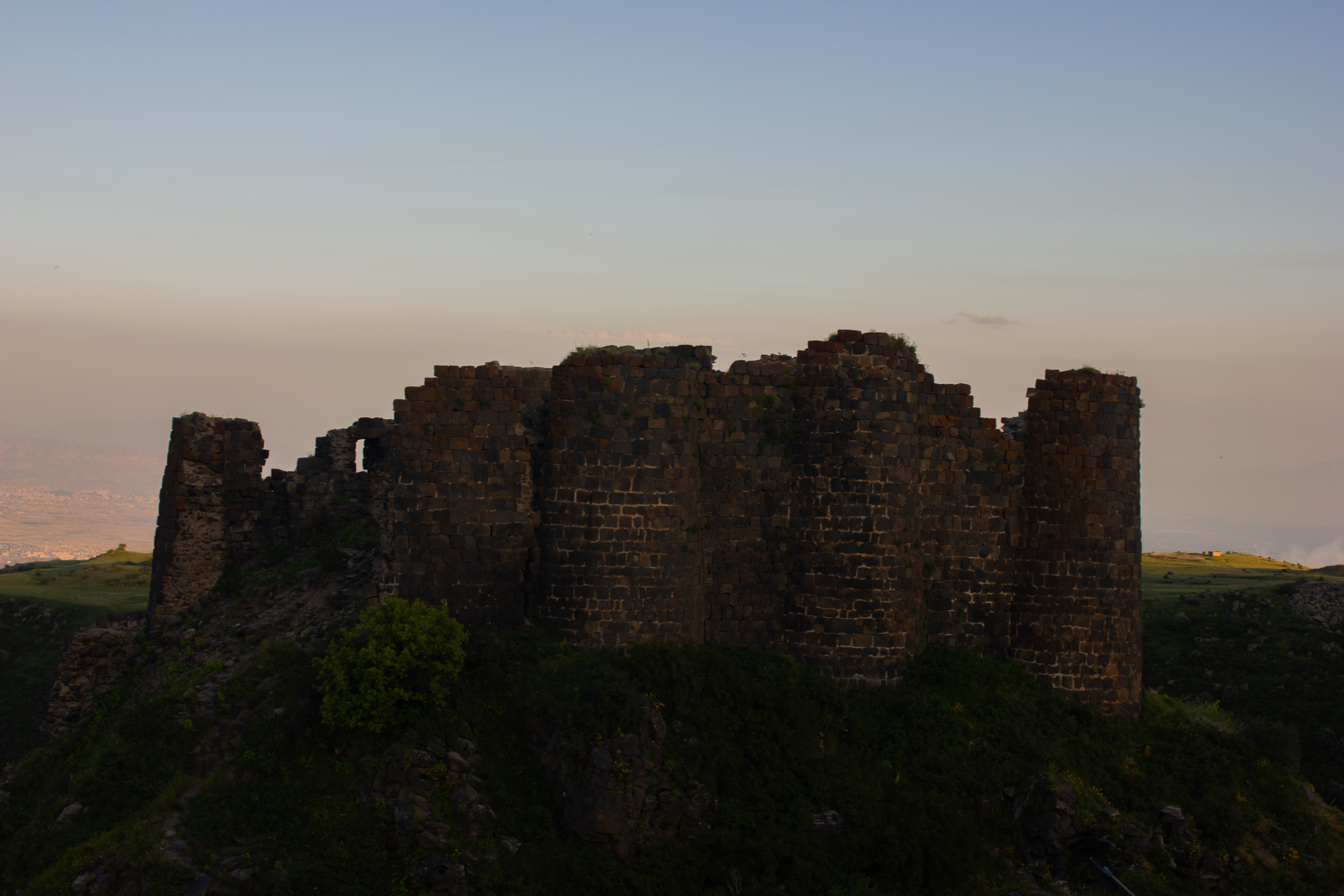

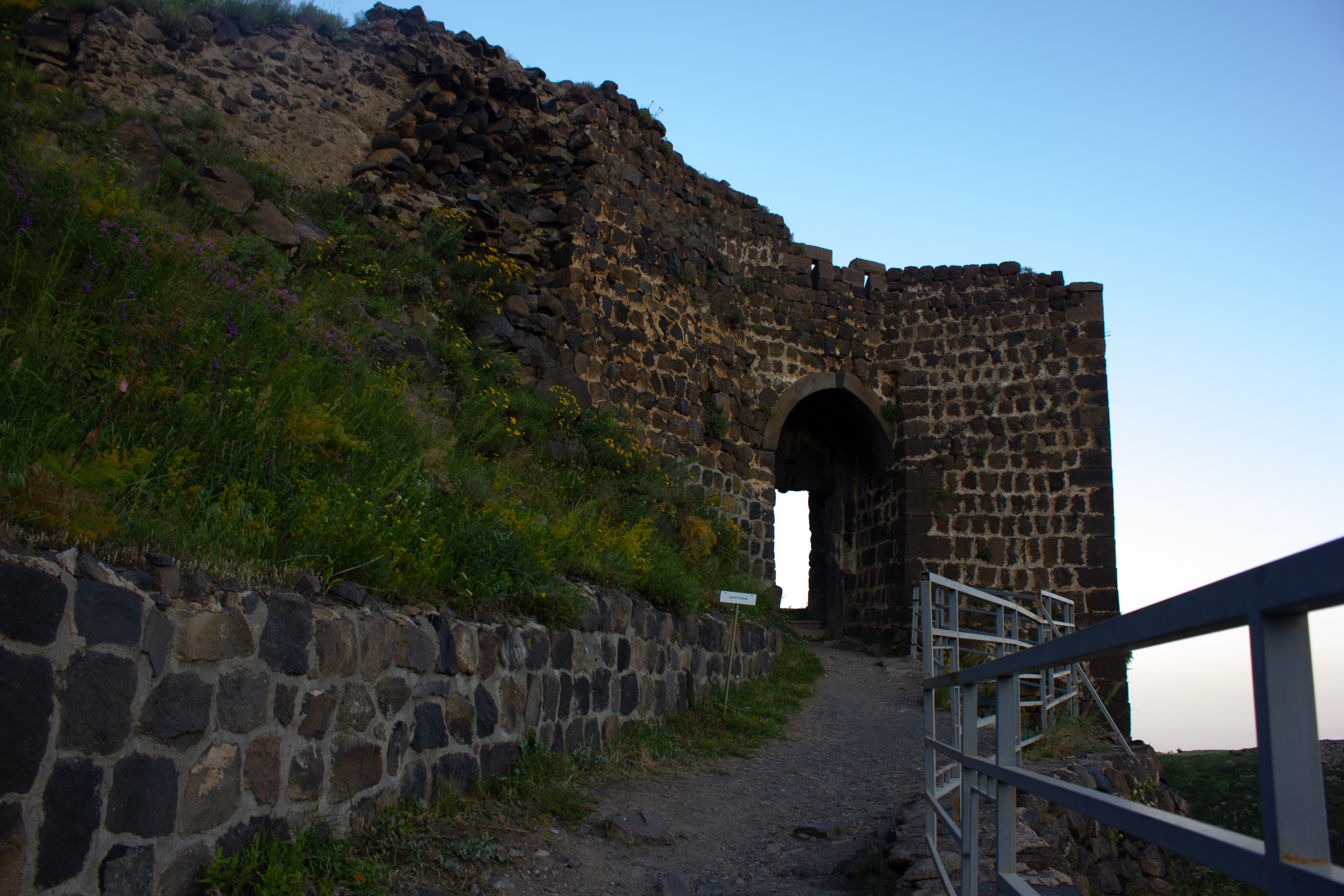

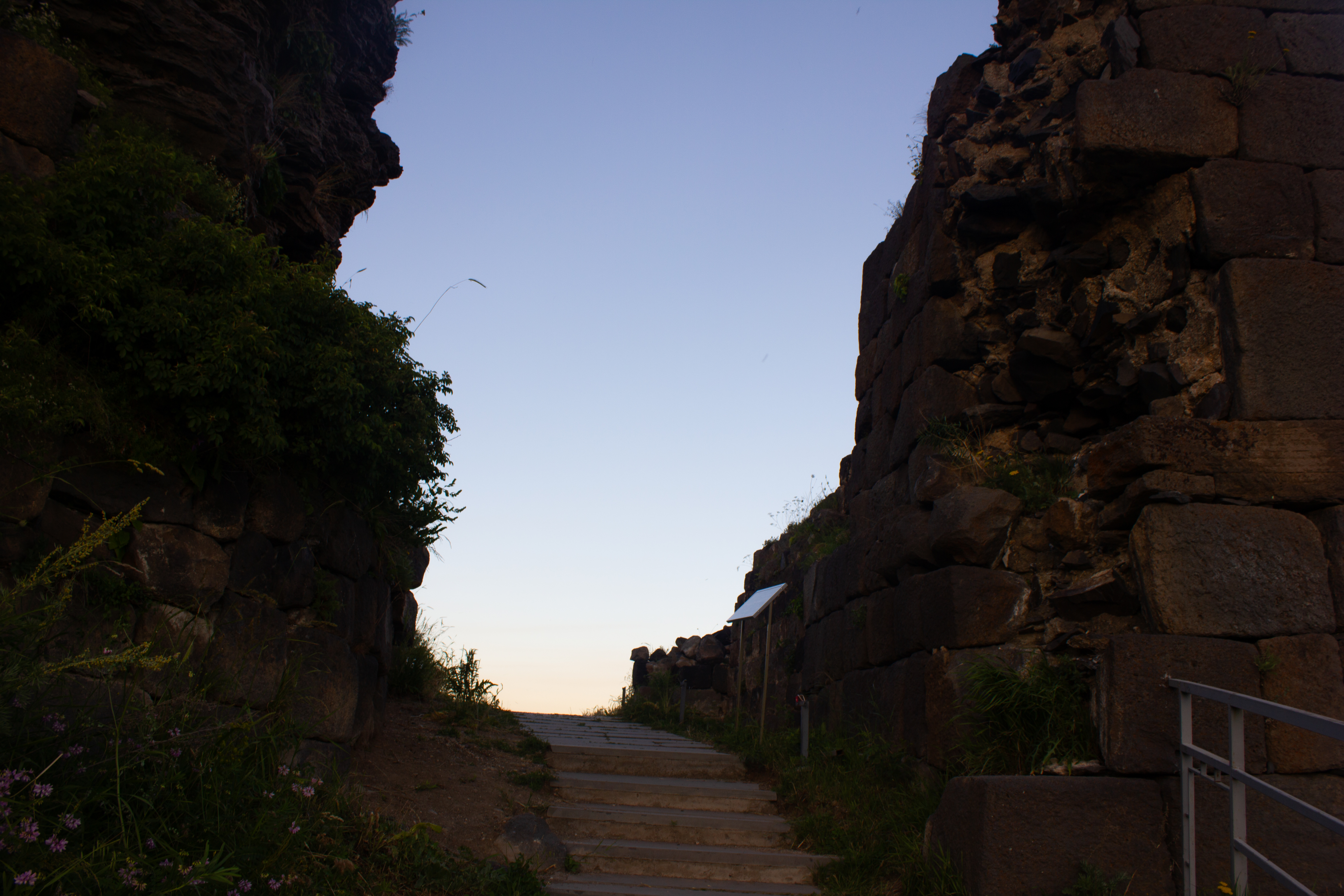

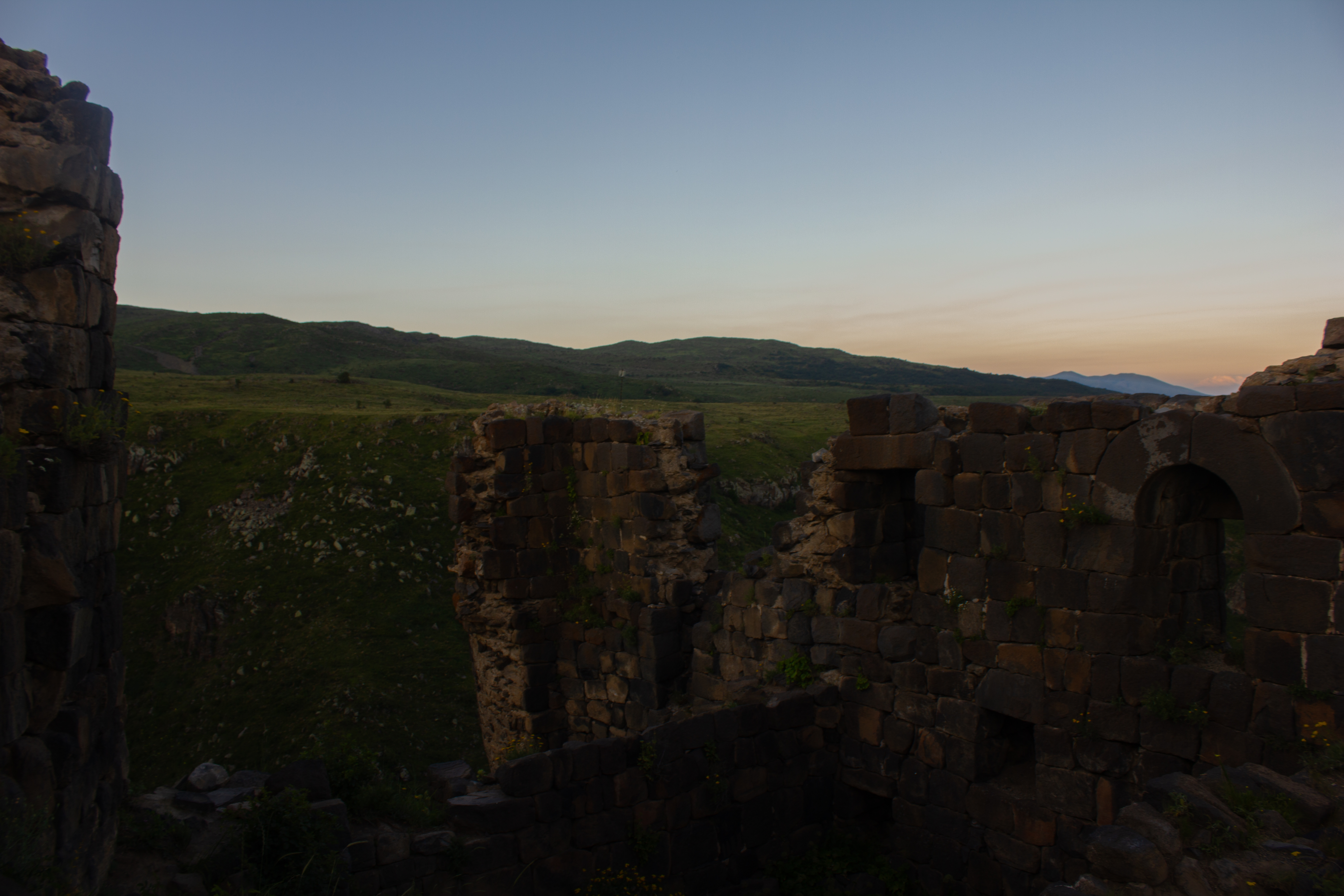

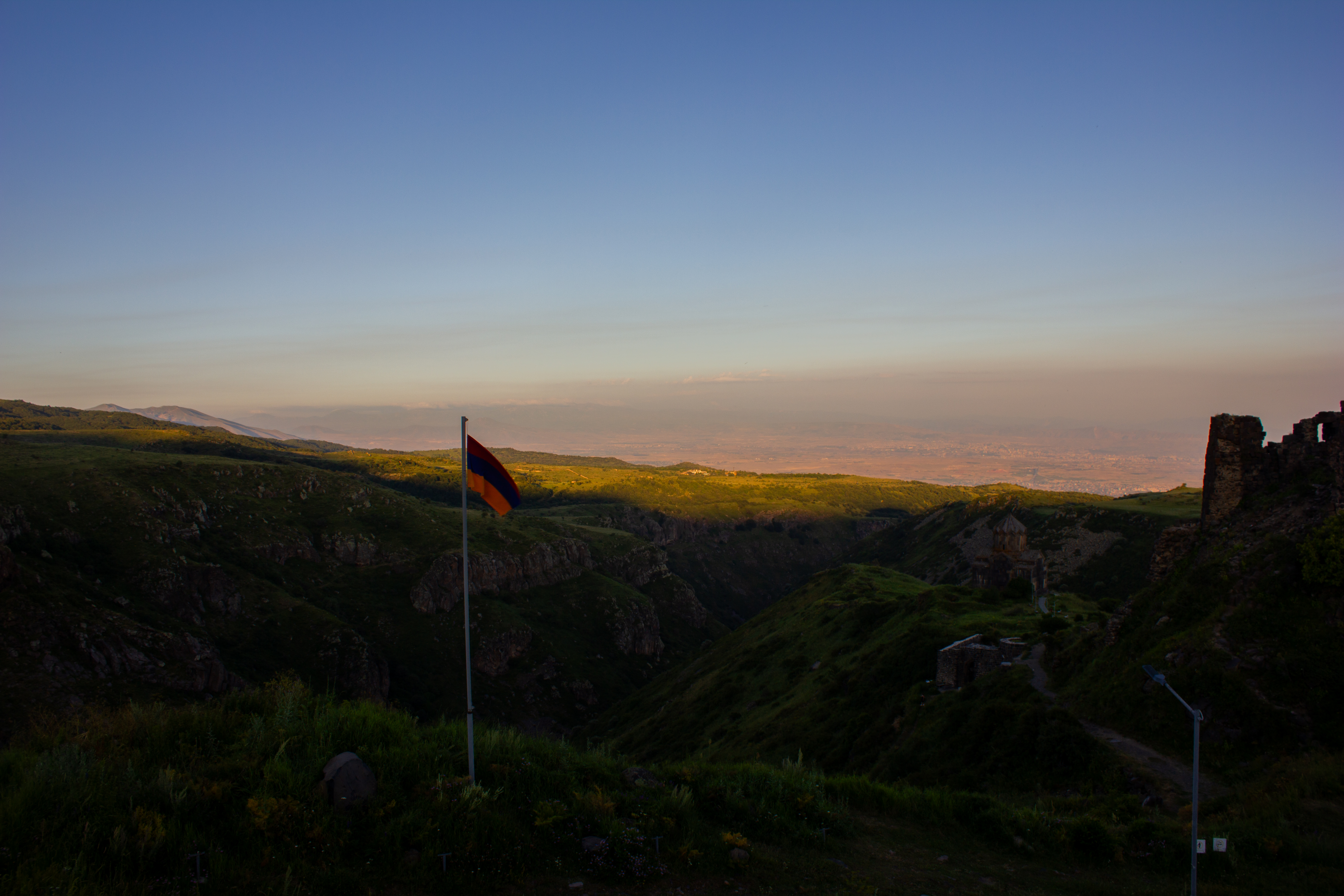

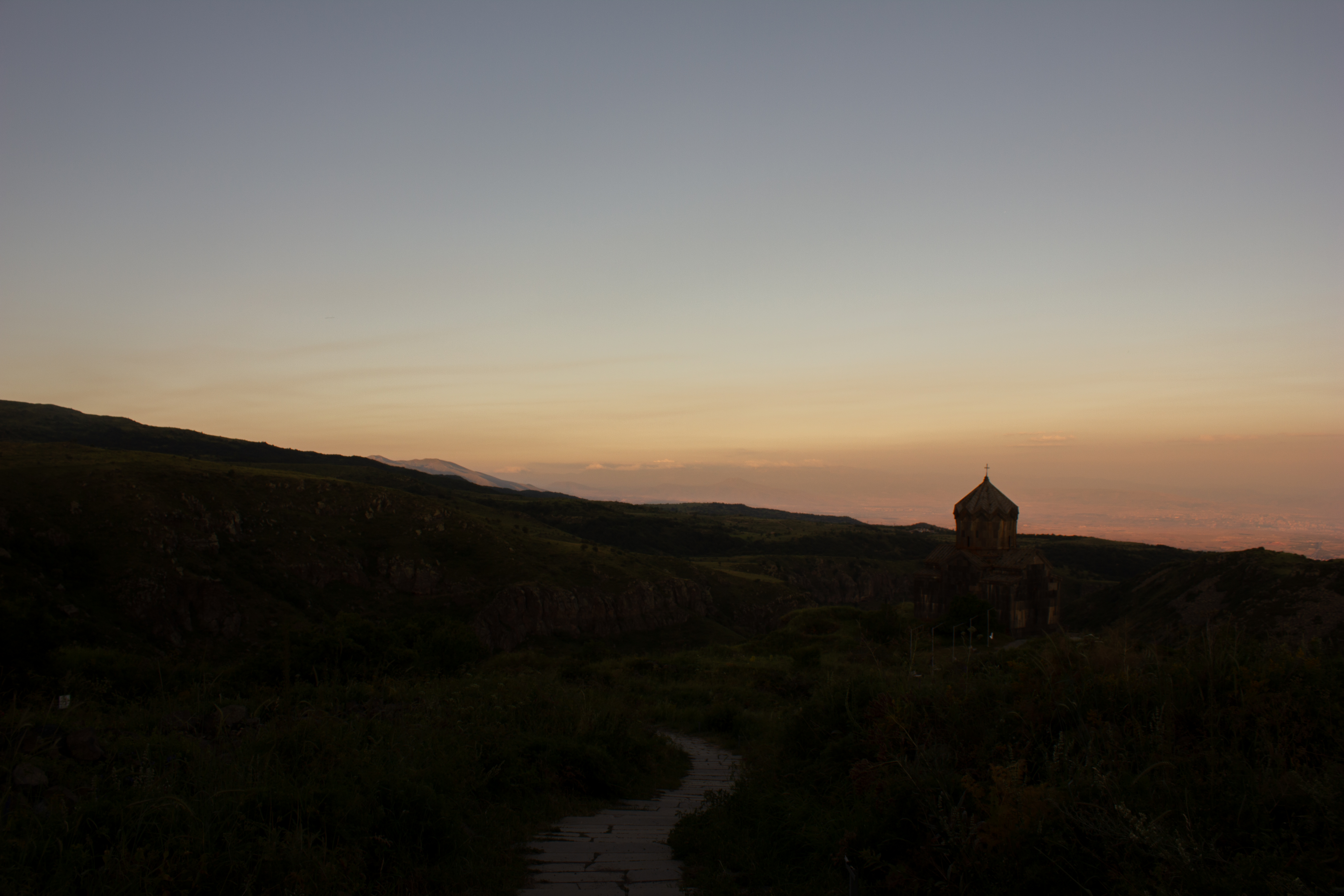

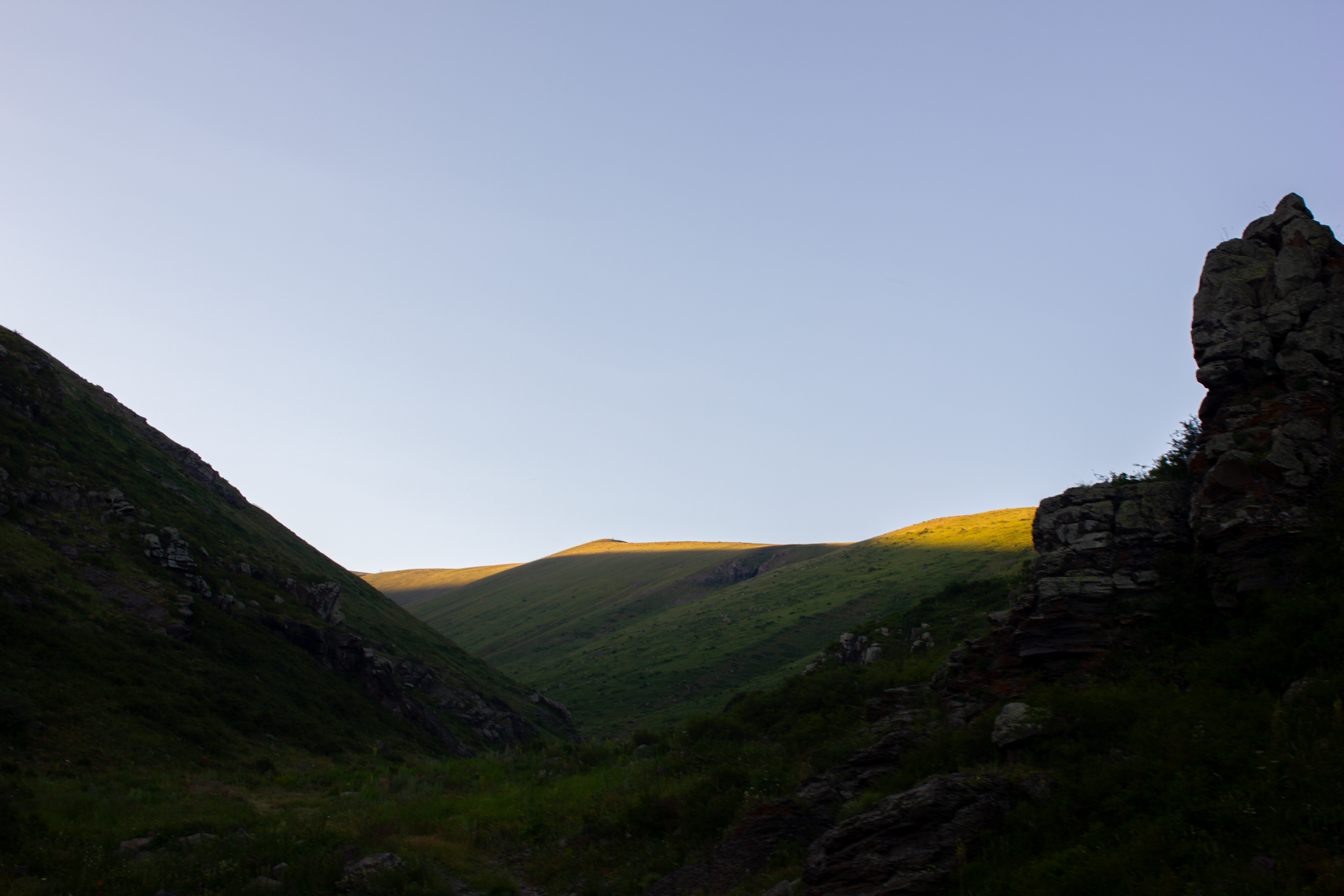

== See also ==
- List of castles in Armenia
