= Lashkari ibn Musa =

Shaddadid emir from 1034 to 1049

Lashkari Ali ibn Musa
- Reign: 1034–1049
- Predecessor: Abu'l-Fath Musa
- Successor: Anushirvan ibn Lashkari

Lashkari Ali ibn Musa ibn Fadl ibn Muhammad ibn Shaddad was the sixth Shaddadid emir, after murdering his father Musa.

== Sources ==
- Minorsky, Vladimir (1977) [1953]. Studies in Caucasian History. Cambridge: Cambridge University Press. ISBN 0-521-05735-3.
- Peacock, Andrew (2011). "SHADDADIDS". Encyclopædia Iranica, Online Edition.

Preceded by Abu'l-Fath Musa	Shaddadid emir of Ganja; 1034–1049	Succeeded by Anushirvan ibn Lashkari
