= Marzuban ibn Muhammad ibn Shaddad =

Shaddadid emir from 978 to 985

Marzuban ibn Muhammad
- Reign: 978–985
- Predecessor: Lashkari ibn Muhammad
- Successor: al-Fadhl ibn Muhammad
- House: Shaddadids

Marzuban ibn Muhammad ibn Shaddad was a Kurdish ruler, the brother of Lashkari ibn Muhammad. He succeeded his brother to the throne of the Shaddadids in 978. He was incompetent, however, and reigned only until his murder by his younger brother Fadl ibn Muhammad in 985.

== Sources ==
- Minorsky, Vladimir (1977) [1953]. Studies in Caucasian History. Cambridge: Cambridge University Press. ISBN 0-521-05735-3.
- Peacock, Andrew (2011). "SHADDADIDS". Encyclopædia Iranica, Online Edition.

| Preceded by Lashkari ibn Muhammad | Shaddadid emir of Ganja; 978–985 | Succeeded by al-Fadhl ibn Muhammad |
