= Fadl ibn Muhammad =

Shaddadid emir from 985 to 1031

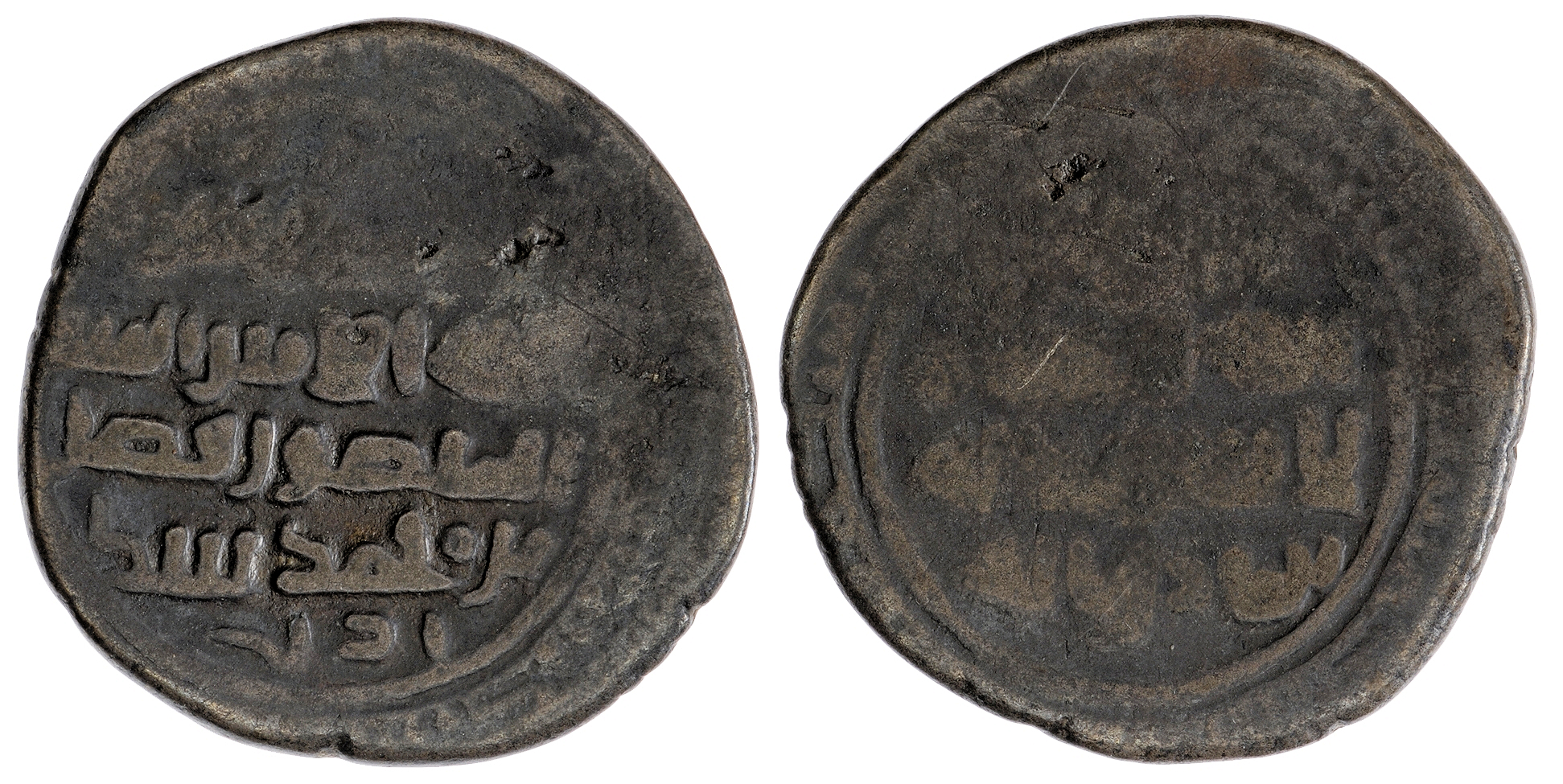
- Coinage of Fadl b. Muhammad Shaddadi, Janza (985-1031 CE).
- Reign: 985–1031
- Predecessor: Marzuban ibn Muhammad
- Successor: Abu'l-Fath Musa
- Died: 1031
- House: Shaddadids

Al-Fadhl ibn Muhammad al-Shaddadi (also al-Fadl ibn Muhammad, Fadl ibn Muhammad, Fadlun ibn Muhammad, Fadhlun ibn Muhammad, or Fadl I was the Shaddadid emir of Arran from 985 to 1031. Of Kurdish origin, al-Fadhl was called "Fadhlun the Kurd" by ibn al-Athir and other Arabic historians. Al-Fadhl was the first Shaddadid emir to issue coinage, locating his mint first at Partav (Barda'a) and was later transferred to Ganja.

Al-Fadhl built a bridge across the Araxes with the intent to raid the Rawadids, and led an expedition against the Khazars around 1030. The Khazars reportedly killed 10,000 of his soldiers. Since the Khazar Khaganate had been destroyed in 969, it is unclear whether these Khazars were from a successor state or kingdom located in the Caucasus, were subjects of a Kipchak or Pecheneg ruler, or whether ibn al-Athir was mistaken or was using "Khazars" as a generic term for steppe people.

In 993, the army of Fadl I captured Barda and Beylagan. During his reign, there were clashes with the Georgian kings, the Byzantines (1037-1038), the Alans and the Rus. Friendly relations were maintained with the Rawadids, the Shirvanshahs, and the Emirate of Tbilisi.

In 1003/1004, following the death of Grigor, ruler of Pharisos, al-Fadl of the Shaddadids imprisoned his son Philip and seized the districts of Shashvash and Shothkh from Grigor’s domains.

In 1026, the king of Georgia, probably Giorgi I, launched a campaign against Shamkur and besieged the city once again. Al-Fadl confronted the Georgian forces in battle and defeated them, forcing the siege to be lifted, and killing 10,000 of them.

According to Ibn al-Athir, Fadl I launched a campaign against the Khazars in 1030.

Al-Fadhl died in 1031 and was succeeded by his son Abu'l-Fath Musa.

== Sources ==
- C.E Bosworth. "Arran". Encyclopaedia Iranica
- Douglas M. Dunlop. The History of the Jewish Khazars, Princeton, N.J.: Princeton University Press, 1954.
- Minorsky, Vladimir (1977) [1953]. Studies in Caucasian History. Cambridge: Cambridge University Press. ISBN 0-521-05735-3.
- Peacock, Andrew (2011). "SHADDADIDS". Encyclopædia Iranica, Online Edition.

| Preceded by Marzuban | Shaddadid emir of Ganja; 985–1031 | Succeeded by Abu'l-Fath Musa |
