= Kingdom of Georgia =

State in the Caucasus from 1008 to 1490

Kingdom of Georgia საქართველოს სამეფო
- 1008–1490
- Flags of Georgia of the 14th–15th centuries according to Dulcert, the Pizzigano brothers and others Coat of arms of "All-Georgian Kingdom" according to Prince Vakhushti's Atlas (c. 1745) Coat of arms of the "Kingdom of Georgia under Khan" according to Grünenberg Wappenbuch (1480)

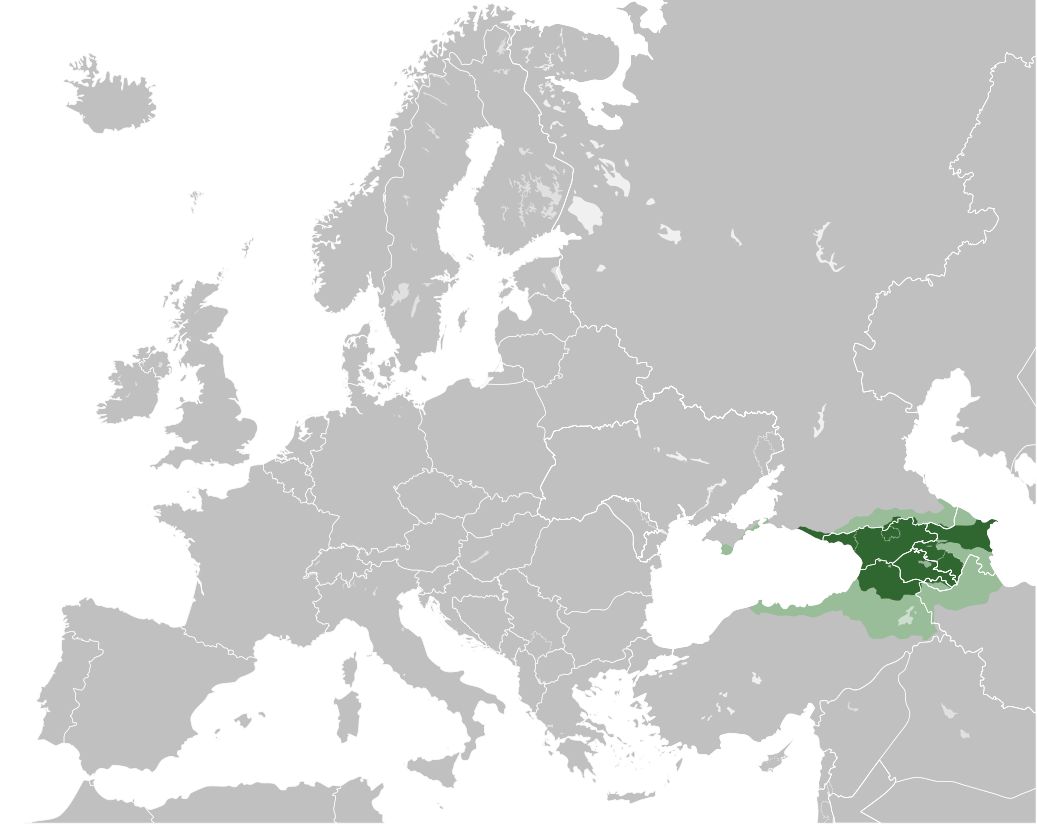
- Kingdom of Georgia in c. 1220, at the peak of its territorial expansion, superimposed on modern borders.

- Administrative division of the Kingdom of Georgia in the 13th century
- Capital: Kutaisi; (c. 1008–1122); Tbilisi; (c. 1122–1490)
- Official languages: Middle Georgian (Note: Official language; used in coinage, civil administration, the royal court, literature, historiography, and religious texts.)
- Common languages: Zan; Greek; Armenian; Arabic (lingua franca/numismatics/chancery); Persian (numismatics)
- Religion: State and majority Eastern Orthodox (Georgian Orthodox Church); Minority: Armenian Apostolic Church; Catholicism; Islam
- Government: Feudal monarchy
- King
  - 1008–1014 (first): Bagrat III
  - 1446–1465 (last) (De facto): George VIII
  - 1478–1490 (last) (De jure): Constantine II
- Legislature: Council of State
- Historical era: High Middle Ages to Late Middle Ages
  - Unification: c. 1008
  - Georgian Golden Age: 1122–1226
  - Interregnum: 1245–1247
  - East and West division: 1247–1329
  - Reunification: 1329
  - Collapse De facto De jure: 1463; 1490 (Note: "In 1490, Constantine II summoned a special royal council that recognized the fragmentation of the Kingdom of Georgia into separate kingdoms and principalities.")
- Currency: Various Byzantine and Sassanian coins were minted until the 12th century.
Preceded by
Kingdom of Abkhazia
Kingdom of the Iberians
Kingdom of Kakheti-Hereti
Emirate of Tbilisi
Succeeded by
Kingdom of Kartli
Kingdom of Kakheti
Kingdom of Imereti
Principality of Samtskhe
- ^{1}the full title of the Georgian monarchs after 1124 was "King of Kings, Autocrat of all the East and the West, Sword of the Messiah, King of Abkhazia, King of Iberia, King of Kakheti and Hereti, King of Armenia, Possessor of Shirvan."

The Kingdom of Georgia, (Note: Georgian: საქართველოს სამეფო, romanized: sakartvelos samepo) also known as the Georgian Empire, (Note: Georgian: საქართველოს იმპერია, romanized: sakartvelos imp'eria) was a medieval Eurasian monarchy that was founded in c. 1008 AD. It reached its Golden Age of political and economic strength during the reign of King David IV and Queen Tamar the Great from the 11th to 13th centuries. Georgia became one of the pre-eminent nations of the Christian East, and its pan-Caucasian empire and network of tributaries stretched from Eastern Europe to Anatolia and northern frontiers of Iran. At the height of its influence, Georgia also maintained several important religious centers abroad, such as the Bachkovo Monastery in Bulgaria, Monastery of the Cross in Jerusalem and the Monastery of Iviron in Greece. It is the principal historical precursor of present-day Georgia.

The Kingdom of Georgia emerged in the early 11th century through the unification of several Georgian kingdoms, most notably the Kingdom of the Iberians and the Kingdom of Abkhazia. It was governed under a feudal system most closely resembling those of Western Europe. Georgia repelled invasions by the Byzantine Empire and the Seljuk Turks, eventually establishing its dominance over much of the South Caucasus. The kingdom came under Mongol influence in the 1240s but managed to reassert its sovereignty by the 1330s. The following decades were marked by the Black Death and numerous invasions led by Timur, which caused significant damage to the country's economy, population, and urban centres. The kingdom's geopolitical position deteriorated further following the Ottoman conquest of the Byzantine Empire and the Empire of Trebizond. As a result of these developments, Georgia had become politically fragmented by the end of the 15th century. This series of events ultimately led to the final collapse of the kingdom into anarchy by 1466.

== Background ==
Over the course of the Roman–Persian wars, early Georgian kingdoms were weakened and reduced to feudal regions. As a result of this decline, some parts of the region subsequently fell prey to the early Muslim conquests of the 7th century.

Iberian princes from the Bagrationi dynasty fought against the Arab occupation and came to rule the Tao-Klarjeti region. They established the Kouropalatate of Iberia as a nominal vassal of the Byzantine Empire. By 888, they had gained control of the central Georgian land, Kartli, and restored the Iberian kingship. The Bagrationi dynasty was unable to maintain their kingdom, and it was divided between the three branches of the family. The main branch controlled Tao, while another controlled Klarjeti.

Over time, Georgia was able to assert greater independence from Byzantium and pave the way to the unification of the Georgian states into a single feudal monarchy. The Georgian Church broke away from Constantinople in the 9th century, instead submitting itself to the authority of the local Georgian Catholicate of Iberia. The church language was changed from Greek to Georgian.

== History ==
=== Unification of the Georgian State ===
During the 10th century, David III of Tao invaded Kartli, a de-facto independent region under the control of the kingdom of Abkhazian, giving it to his adopted son, who would later be known as Bagrat III of Georgia, with his biological father, Gurgen of Iberia, as regent. In 994, Gurgen was crowned King of the Iberians. In 975, supported by a Duke of Kartli Ioane Marushisdze and David, Bagrat claimed the throne of Kartli, becoming King of the Kartlians. During this time, the Kingdom of Abkhazia encompassing what is today western Georgia was under the rule of Theodosius the Blind, who did not have a successor and was the maternal uncle of Bagrat III. In 978, the Abkhazian aristocracy, dissatisfied with the rule of Theodosius, performed a coup d'état and invited Bagrat to claim the throne of Abkhazia.

Gurgen died in 1008, leaving his throne for Bagrat, allowing Bagrat to become the first king of a unified Abkhazia and Iberia. In his early reign, Bagrat pressed a claim to the kingdom of Khakheti-Hereti to the east, and annexed it in 1010. Bagrat also reduced the autonomy of dynastic princes to stabilize his realm, with his fears focusing on the Klarjeti line of the Bagrationi. In order to secure the throne for his son, George I of Georgia, Bagrat tricked his cousins into a meeting and imprisoned them, and his cousins' children fled to Constantinople, where they requested the aid of the Byzantine Empire to take back their patrimonial land.

Bagrat's reign secured a victory for the Bagratids of Georgia, ending the power-struggles that had plagued the region for centuries. Bagrat had a peaceful foreign policy, successfully avoiding conflicts with the Byzantines and nearby Muslim realms, even though some of David's territory, such as Tao and Tbilisi, remained in Byzantine and Arab control, respectively.

=== War and peace with Byzantium ===
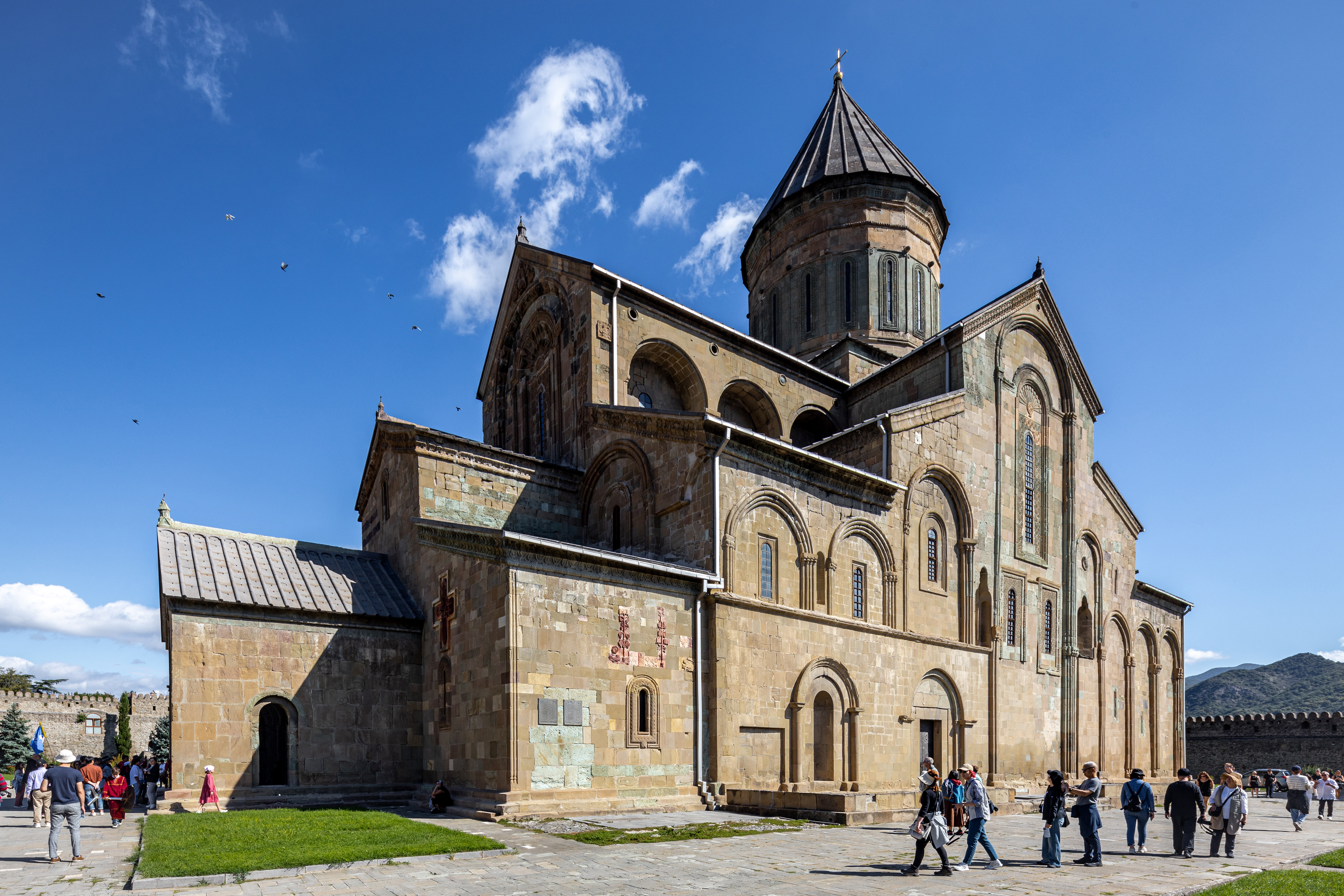
Svetitskhoveli Cathedral, the largest Georgian church of its time, commissioned by George I of Georgia

George I's reign was known primarily for its war against the Byzantines. This war had its roots in the 990s, when David III, after losing a rebellion against the Byzantine Emperor Basil II, agreed to cede his lands in Tao to the emperor upon his death. George I, in an attempt to take back the Kuropalates' land, occupied Tao starting from 1015 or 1016, during a Byzantine war with the Bulgarian Empire. When Bulgaria was dealt with in 1021, Basil II turned his attention to Georgia, leading to a two-year-long war and an eventual Byzantine victory. George, as a result, had to abandon his claims in Tao and surrender some of his southwestern lands, which were eventually made into the theme of Iberia. George's son, who would eventually become Bagrat IV, was also given to Basil as a hostage. During the war against Byzantium, Gagik, a relative of Kvirike III the Great, rebelled and took control of eastern Georgia, restoring the Kingdom of Kakheti-Hereti.

Despite those setbacks, George's reign saw the construction of the modern buildings of Svetitskhoveli Cathedral, Samtavisi Cathedral and Samtavro Monastery.

Bagrat IV spent the next three years in Constantinople, being released in 1025. George I's death in 1027 saw him succeeded by the 8-year-old Bagrat. By the time Bagrat ascended to the throne, the Bagratids' unification drive had gained much momentum. Many of the Georgian lands, such as Tao, Tbilisi, Kakheti and Hereti, were either under the rule of foreign empires or of independent kings. The loyalty of Georgian nobles was also questionable. Bagrat IV's childhood saw the regency increase the influence of the nobility, something which he tried to stop when he assumed his full powers.

=== Great Turkish Invasion ===
In the later half of the 11th century, the Seljuq Turks invaded nearby regions, prompting greater cooperation between the Georgian and Byzantine governments. In a political arrangement, Bagrat's daughter Maria married the Byzantine co-emperor Michael VII Doukas at some point between 1066 and 1071.

In 1065 the Seljuk sultan Alp Arslan attacked Kartli, taking Tbilisi and building a mosque. During the internecine conflict between Seljuk heirs, George II of Georgia defeated a Seljuk governor, Sarang of Ganja, at the Battle of Partskhisi in 1074. In 1076, the Seljuk sultan Malik Shah I attacked again. Georgia eventually submitted to Malik Shah, paying an annual tribute in order to have peace.

=== Georgian Reconquista ===
==== David IV ====
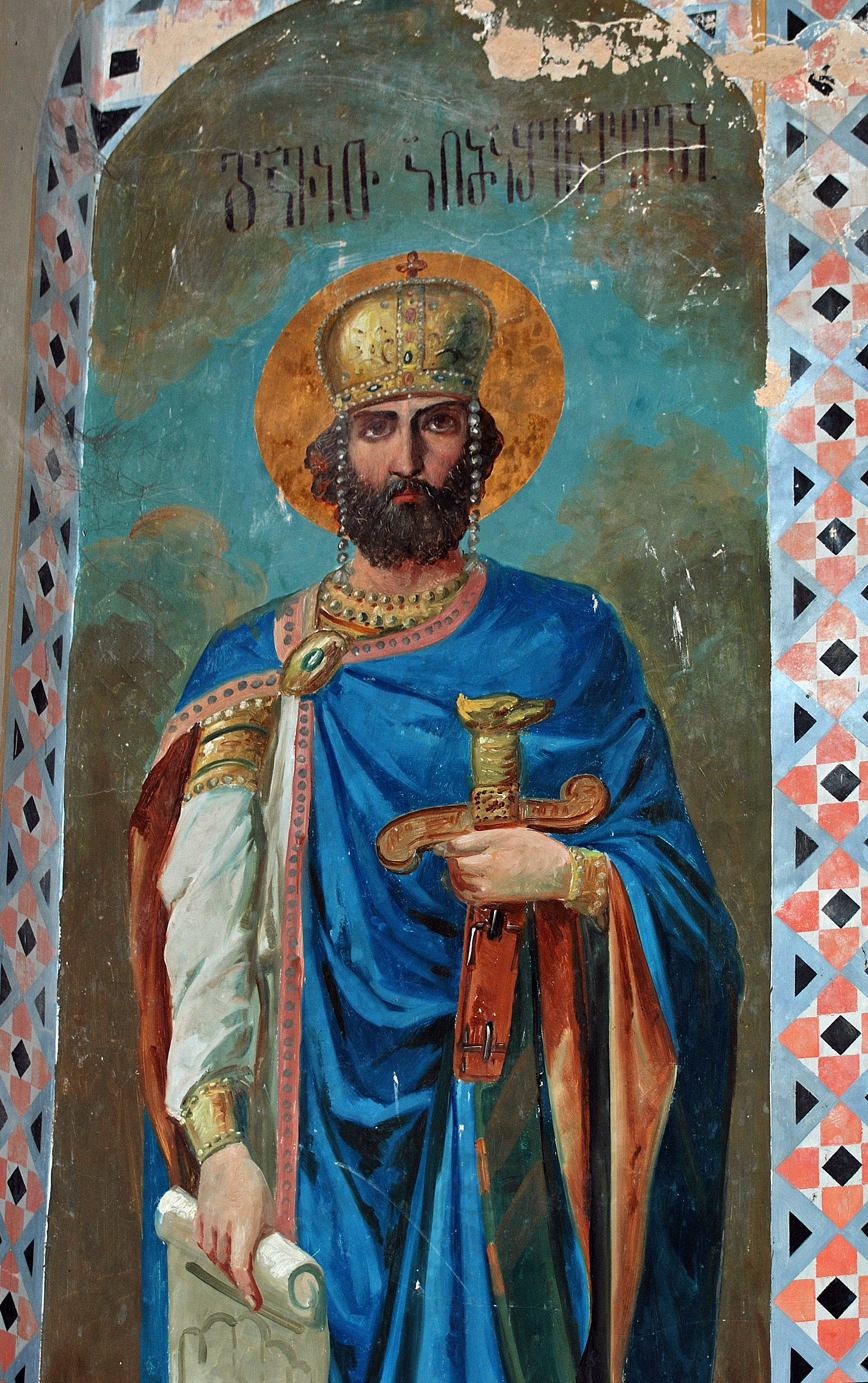
David IV of Georgia, a fresco from the Shio-Mgvime monastery

George II ceded the crown to his 16-year-old son David IV in 1089. Under the tutelage of his court minister, George of Chqondidi, David IV suppressed the feudal lords and centralized the power. In 1089–1100, he organized military action to destroy Seljuk troops, beginning the resettlement of occupied regions. In 1099, David IV refused to pay tribute to the Seljuqs.

By 1104, the local king of the eastern Georgia province of Kakheti, Aghsartan II, was captured by David IV's supporters, reuniting eastern Georgia with David's realm. The following year, David IV defeated a Seljuk force in the Battle of Ertsukhi. After that David IV captured the fortresses of Samshvilde in 1110, Rustavi in 1115, Gishi in 1117, and Lore in 1118.

Starting in 1118 through 1120, David IV began major military reforms, including the resettlement of several thousand Kipchaks. In exchange, each Kipchak family provided David IV with a soldier, allowing him to establish a standing army. This alliance was aided by David IV's earlier marriage to the Khan's daughter.

Entering 1120, David IV became more expansionist. He invaded the neighbouring Shirvan area and the town of Qabala. From there, he began to successfully attack the Seljuk in the eastern and southwestern areas of Transcaucasia. In 1121, Sultan Mahmud b. Muhammad declared a holy war on Georgia, but David IV defeated his army at Didgori in 1121, marking the end of the Turkish hegemony in the Caucasus. Soon after, in the same year, David IV secured Tbilisi, one of the last Muslim enclaves remaining in Georgia, and the capital was moved there, beginning Georgia's Golden Age.

Gelati Monastery, a UNESCO World Heritage Site

In 1123, David IV liberated Dmanisi, the last Seljuk stronghold in southern Georgia. By 1124, Shirvan was captured along with the Armenian city of Ani. This expanded the kingdom's borders to the Araxes basin.

David IV founded the Gelati Academy, known at the time as "a new Hellas" and "a second Athos". David also composed the Hymns of Repentance, eight free-verse psalms.

==== Reign of Demetrius I and George III ====
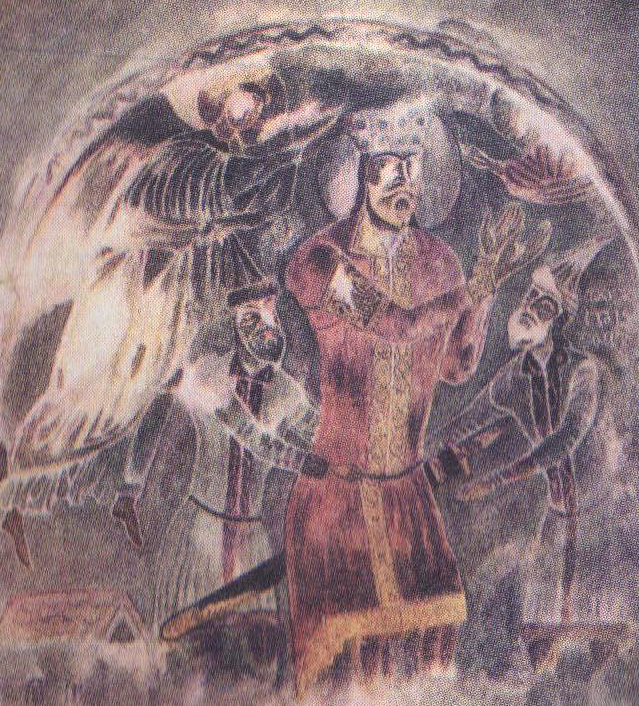
Coronation of Demetrius I, a fresco from Matskhvarishi, 1140

The kingdom continued to flourish under Demetrius I, the son of David. Demetrius instituted religious tolerance throughout his kingdom, going so far as to grant the Muslims of Tbilisi tax exemptions and religious privileges. Despite this, neighbouring Muslim rulers began attacking Georgia from all sides. The Seljuk sultans sought to restore the rule of the Shirvanshahs in Shirvan, whose large Muslim population rose against Georgian rule. This probably occurred in 1129 or 1130, when Demetrius restored the Shirvanshahs to power in Shirvan, placing Manuchihr II, the husband of his daughter Rusudan, on the throne. The Shirvanshahs were obliged to provide the Georgian king with troops whenever he demanded them. In 1130, Georgia was attacked by Sökmen II, the Shah-Armen ruler of Ahlat (c. 1128–1183). The conflict was prompted by the transfer of Ani into Georgian hands. Demetrius I was forced to compromise and surrender the city to the Shaddadid emir Fadl ibn Mahmud, on condition that he acknowledge Georgian vassalage and guarantee the inviolability of its Christian churches. In 1139, Demetrius raided the city of Ganja in Arran. He brought the iron gate of the defeated city to Georgia and donated it to Gelati Monastery near Kutaisi. Despite this victory, Demetrius was able to hold Ganja for only a few years. In response, the ruler of the Eldiguzids attacked Ganja several times, and the town returned to his control in 1143. According to Mkhitar Gosh, Demetrius ultimately regained possession of Ganja but subsequently presented it to the sultan as a dowry when he gave his daughter in marriage to him. The sultan then appointed his own emir to govern the town, which once again fell under Eldiguzid control.

Thou Art a Vineyard
Thou Art a Vineyard, a medieval Georgian polyphonic hymn performed by a choir

In 1130, Demetrius uncovered a conspiracy among the nobles, probably involving the king's half-brother Vakhtang. The king arrested the conspirators and executed one of their leaders, Ioanne Abuletisdze, in 1138 (or 1145).

Fadl's successor, Fakr al-Din Shaddad, a Shaddadid emir of Ani, sought to marry the daughter of Saltuk, but Saltuk refused his request. This provoked deep hostility between Shaddad and Saltuk. In 1154, Shaddad devised a plot and formed a secret alliance with Demetrius I. While a Georgian army waited in ambush, Shaddad offered tribute to the Saltukid ruler of Erzerum and asked him to accept him as a vassal. In 1153–1154, Emir Saltuk II marched against Ani, but Shaddad informed his suzerain, the King of Georgia, of the impending attack. Demetrius marched to Ani, defeated Saltuk's army and captured the emir. At the request of neighbouring Muslim rulers, Demetrius released him in exchange for a ransom of 100,000 dinars, which was paid by Saltuk's sons-in-law. Saltuk swore that he would not fight against the Georgians after his return home.

Although his reign was marked by a disruptive family conflict over the royal succession, Georgia remained a centralized power with a strong military. A talented poet, Demetrius also continued his father's contributions to Georgian religious polyphony. His most famous hymn is Thou Art a Vineyard.

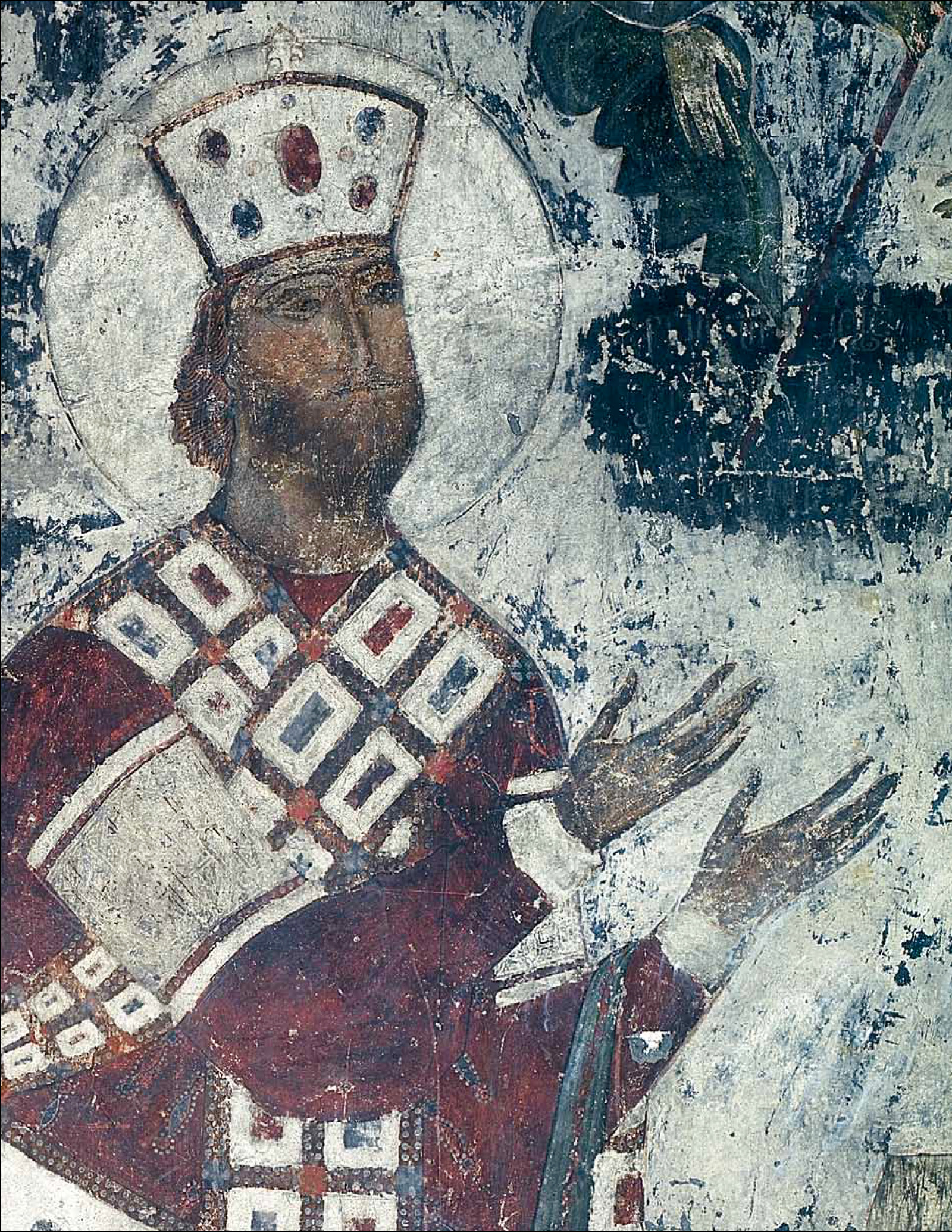
George III as depicted on a medieval fresco from Vardzia

Demetrius was succeeded by his son George III in 1156, marking the beginning of a more aggressive foreign policy. In the same year, George launched a successful campaign against the Shah-Armens, raiding their territories and returning with prisoners and booty. In 1161, George III captured Ani and appointed his general, Ivane Orbeli, as its governor. A coalition comprising the ruler of Ahlat, Shah-Armen Sökmen II, the ruler of Diyarbekir, Kotb ad-Din il-Ghazi, the ruler of Erzerum, and other Muslim leaders was formed in response to the Georgian seizure of the city, but George defeated the allied forces. In 1162, the Georgian army, numbering approximately 30,000 men, captured Dvin. In response, Eldiguz soon marched northward to recover the city. A coalition of Muslim rulers, including Shah-Armen Seyfettin Beytemür, Ahmadili Arslan-Aba, the emir of Arzen, Fakhr ul-Din, and Saltuk II, led by Eldiguz, captured the fortress of Gagi. They ravaged the surrounding territories as far as Gegharkunik, taking prisoners and booty, before advancing on Ani. They captured the city and handed it over to the Shaddadid emir Shahanshah ibn Mahmud. The Muslim rulers celebrated their success and prepared for another campaign. However, George III forestalled them by marching into Arran in early 1166. He occupied territory extending as far as Ganja, devastated the surrounding lands and returned with prisoners and booty. The Shaddadids ruled Ani for approximately ten years as vassals of Eldiguz. In 1174, however, George III captured Shahanshah and occupied Ani once again, appointing Ivane II Orbeli as its governor.

=== Golden Age ===
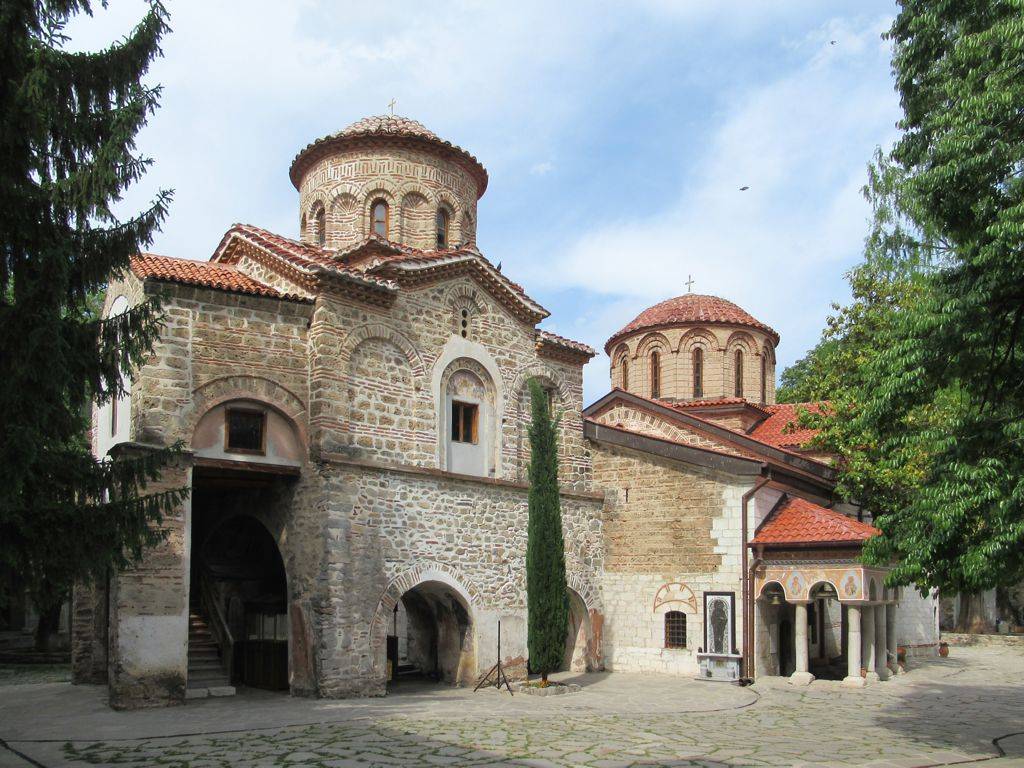
Bachkovo Monastery in Bulgaria was one of the centres of Georgian scholarship in the Middle Ages

The unified monarchy maintained its precarious independence from the Byzantine and Seljuk empires throughout the 11th century and flourished under David IV the Builder (c. 1089–1125), who repelled the Seljuk attacks and essentially completed the unification of Georgia with the re-conquest of Tbilisi in 1122. Despite repeated incidents of dynastic strife, the kingdom continued to prosper during the reigns of Demetrios I (c. 1125–1156), George III (c. 1156–1184), and especially his daughter Tamar (c. 1184–1213).

With the decline of Byzantine power and the dissolution of the Great Seljuk Empire, Georgia became one of the pre-eminent nations of the region, stretching, at its greatest extent, from present-day Southern Russia to northern Iran, and westwards into Anatolia. The Kingdom of Georgia brought about the Georgian Golden Age, a historical period in the High Middle Ages spanning roughly from the late 11th to the 13th centuries, when the kingdom reached the zenith of its power and development. The period saw the flourishing of medieval Georgian architecture, painting, and poetry, which was frequently expressed in the development of ecclesiastical art, as well as the creation of the first major works of secular literature. It was a period of military, political, economic, and cultural progress. It also included the so-called Georgian Renaissance (also called the Eastern Renaissance), during which various human activities and forms of craftsmanship and art, such as literature, philosophy, and architecture, thrived in the kingdom.

==== Queen Tamar's reign ====
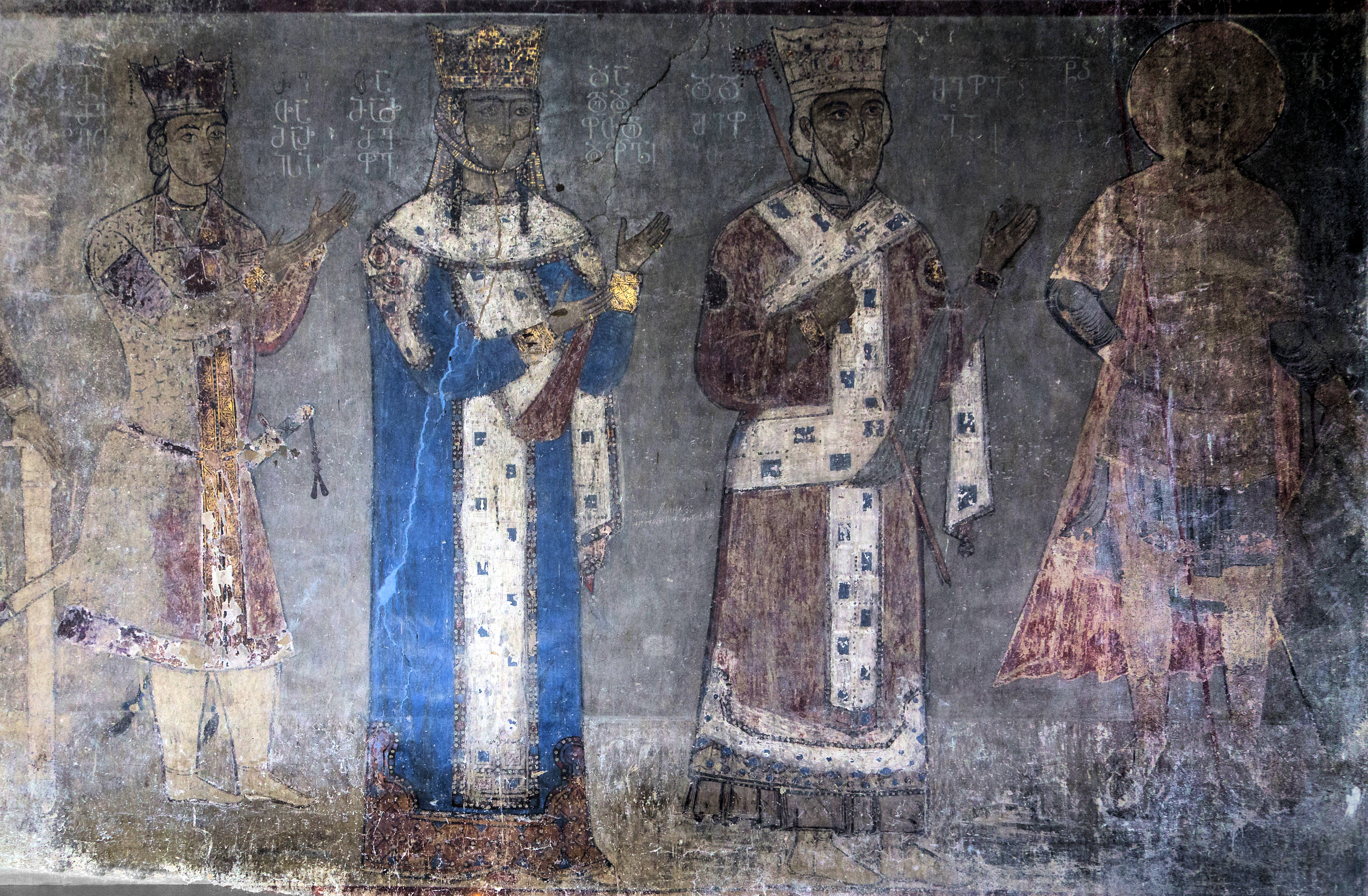
Queen Tamar and her father, King George III, depicted in a fresco at Betania monastery

Tamar not only shielded much of her empire from further Turkish invasions but also successfully pacified internal tensions, including two unsuccessful revolts in 1189–1191 led by her former husband Yury Bogolyubsky, an exiled prince of Kievan Rus' and son of Andrey Bogolyubsky of Vladimir-Suzdal, who had earlier been ousted from Novgorod.

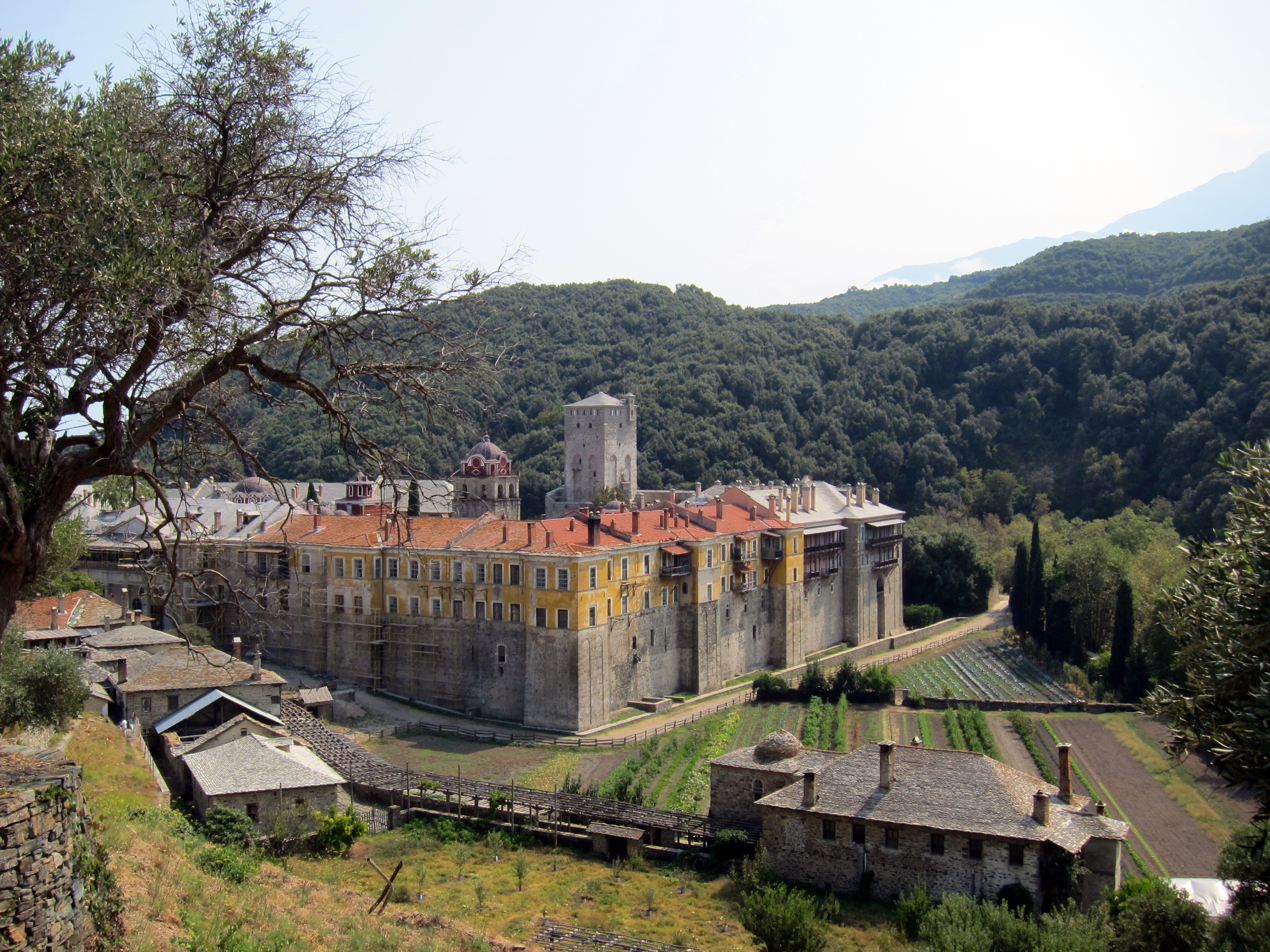
During Tamar's reign, the kingdom patronised Georgian-built religious centres overseas, such as Iviron Monastery

Early in the 1190s, the Georgian government began to interfere in the affairs of the Eldiguzids and the Shirvanshahs, aiding rival local princes and reducing Shirvan to a tributary state. The Eldiguzid atabeg Abu Bakr attempted to stem the Georgian advance but suffered a defeat at the hands of David Soslan at the Battle of Shamkor and lost his capital to a Georgian protégé in 1195. Although Abu Bakr was able to resume his reign a year later, the Eldiguzids were only barely able to contain further Georgian incursions.

The question of the liberation of Armenia remained of prime importance in Georgia's foreign policy. Tamar's armies, led by two Christianised Kurdish generals, Zakare and Ivane Mkhargrdzeli (Zakarian), overran fortresses and cities towards the Ararat Plain, reclaiming fortresses and districts one after another from local Muslim rulers.

Alarmed by the Georgian successes, Süleymanshah II, the resurgent Seljuqid sultan of Rûm, rallied his vassal emirs and marched against Georgia, but his camp was attacked and destroyed by David Soslan at the Battle of Basian in 1203 or 1204. The chronicler of Tamar describes how the army was assembled at the rock-hewn town of Vardzia before marching on to Basian, and how the queen addressed the troops from the balcony of the church. Exploiting her success in this battle, between 1203 and 1205 the Georgians seized the town of Dvin and entered Ahlatshah possessions twice, subduing the emir of Kars (a vassal of the Saltukids in Erzurum), the Ahlatshahs, and the emirs of Erzurum and Erzincan. In 1206, the Georgian army, under the command of David Soslan, captured Kars and other fortresses and strongholds along the Araxes. This campaign was evidently launched because the ruler of Erzerum had refused to submit to Georgia. The emir of Kars requested aid from the Ahlatshahs, but the latter were unable to respond. Kars was soon taken over by the Ayyubid Sultanate in 1207. By 1209, Georgia was challenging Ayyubid rule in the Armenian highlands and leading a liberation war for southern Armenia. The Georgian army besieged Khlat. In response, the Ayyubid Sultan al-Adil I assembled and personally led a large Muslim army that included the emirs of Homs, Hama, and Baalbek, as well as contingents from other Ayyubid principalities, to support al-Awhad, emir of Jazira. During the siege, the Georgian general Ivane Mkhargrdzeli accidentally fell into the hands of al-Awhad on the outskirts of Ahlat. Using Ivane as a bargaining chip, al-Awhad agreed to release him in return for a thirty-year truce with Georgia, thus ending the immediate Georgian threat to the Ayyubids. This brought the struggle for the Armenian lands to a standstill, leaving the Lake Van region to the Ayyubids of Damascus.

Kingdom of Georgia under the reign of Queen Tamar.

Among the remarkable events of Tamar's reign was the foundation of the Empire of Trebizond on the Black Sea in 1204. This state was established in the northeast of the crumbling Byzantine Empire with the help of the Georgian armies, which supported Alexios I of Trebizond and his brother, David Komnenos, both of whom were Tamar's relatives. Alexios and David were fugitive Byzantine princes raised at the Georgian court. Tamar's Pontic endeavour can also be explained by her desire to take advantage of the Western European Fourth Crusade against Constantinople to establish a friendly state in Georgia's immediate southwestern neighbourhood, as well as by dynastic solidarity with the dispossessed Komnenoi.

As retribution for the attack on the Georgian-controlled city of Ani, where 12,000 Christians were massacred in 1208, Tamar's Georgia invaded and conquered the cities of Tabriz, Ardabil, Khoy, Qazvin, and others along the way to Gorgan, in northeastern Persia.

The country's power had grown to such an extent that, in the later years of Tamar's rule, the kingdom was primarily concerned with the protection of the Georgian monastic centres in the Holy Land, eight of which were listed in Jerusalem. Saladin's biographer Bahā' ad-Dīn ibn Šaddād reports that, after the Ayyubid conquest of Jerusalem in 1187, Tamar sent envoys to the sultan to request the return of the confiscated possessions of the Georgian monasteries in Jerusalem. Saladin's response is not recorded, but the queen's efforts seem to have been successful. Ibn Šaddād furthermore claims that Tamar outbid the Byzantine emperor in her efforts to obtain the relics of the True Cross, offering 200,000 gold pieces to Saladin, who had taken the relics as booty at the Battle of Hattin—to no avail, however.

Jacques de Vitry, the Patriarch of Jerusalem at that time, wrote:

There is also in the East another Christian people, who are very warlike and valiant in battle, being strong in body and powerful in the countless numbers of their warriors...Being entirely surrounded by infidel nations...these men are called Georgians, because they especially revere and worship St. George...Whenever they come on pilgrimage to the Lord's Sepulchre, they march into the Holy City...without paying tribute to anyone, for the Saracens dare in no wise molest them...

=== Nomadic invasions ===
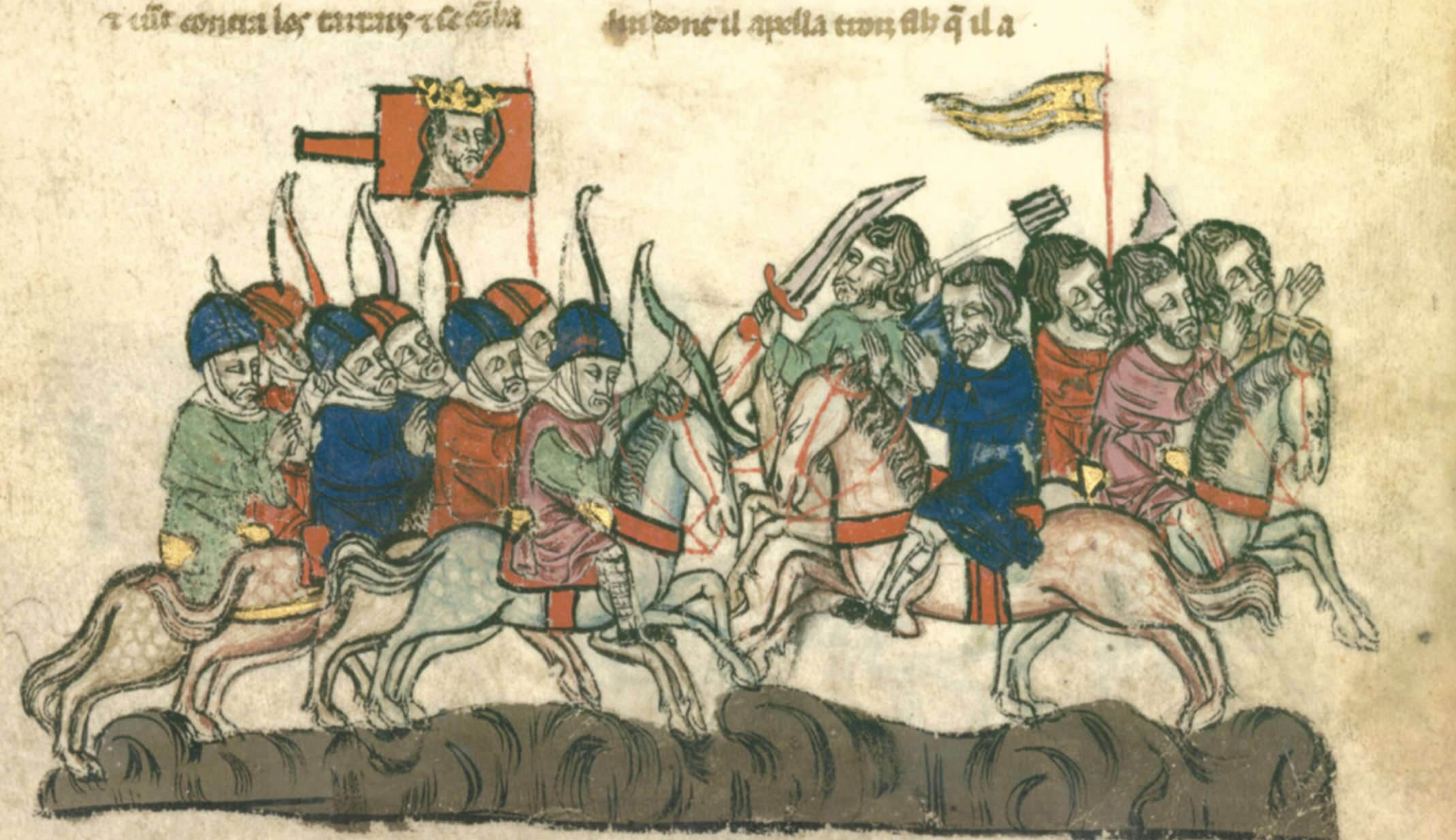
A medieval illustration of the Georgian king George IV Lasha waging war against the Mongols in 1220.

==== Reign of George IV and Rusudan ====
Following the death of Queen Tamar in 1213, her son George IV Lasha succeeded to the throne. His reign initially continued the expansionist policies of his mother, maintaining Georgian influence over neighboring territories and seeking to strengthen the kingdom's position in the region. In 1219, George IV undertook military campaigns against several neighboring Muslim rulers, including those of Erzurum, Nakhchivan, and Ahlat, compelling them to acknowledge Georgian supremacy and pay tribute. During his reign, the Georgian monarchy also considered participating in the Fifth Crusade, and preparations were reportedly made for a military expedition to the Holy Land.

However, the kingdom's military campaigns were interrupted by the arrival of the Mongols in the Caucasus. In 1220, a Mongol army commanded by Subutai and Jebe, two of Genghis Khan's most experienced generals, crossed the Caucasus while pursuing the fleeing forces of the Khwarazmian Empire. Their appearance marked the beginning of a new threat to Georgia, which had previously been one of the dominant military powers in the region. The Georgian army confronted the Mongols but was defeated in two successive battles. The invaders then continued their advance through the Caucasus, avoiding prolonged occupation and gathering information about the region's military strength and political situation. The Mongols returned to Georgian territory during their campaign of 1221–1222. Despite the Georgians' attempts to resist, their forces were unable to stop the Mongol advance. The repeated clashes caused considerable losses and demonstrated the difficulty of confronting the Mongols, whose speed, mobility, and military tactics gave them a considerable advantage over the Georgian army. During these campaigns, George IV was seriously wounded. His condition deteriorated, and he died on 18 January 1223 at Bagavan, in historical Armenia. As he left no surviving legitimate heir, the throne passed to his sister, Rusudan, whose reign began at a time when the kingdom was already facing serious military and political difficulties.

Rusudan's reign (1223–1245) was marked by repeated invasions and the loss of much of the kingdom's political influence. In 1225, Jalal al-Din Mangburni, the last ruler of the Khwarazmian Empire, invaded Georgia while retreating westward before the Mongols. The Georgian army was defeated at the Battle of Garni, and in 1226 Jalal al-Din captured Tbilisi. The city was sacked, and much of its population was killed.

A further invasion began in 1236, when Mongol forces led by Chormaqan entered Georgia. Rusudan withdrew to Kutaisi, leaving the eastern provinces exposed to the advancing army. Many Georgian nobles surrendered without offering prolonged resistance, while others defended their castles and fortified settlements. The Mongols gradually brought eastern Georgia under their control, although their authority was less firmly established in the western part of the kingdom.

Rusudan sought military assistance from the pope and other Christian rulers in an effort to resist the Mongol invasion, but her appeals brought no effective support. By 1243, she had been forced to acknowledge Mongol suzerainty. Georgia became a tributary of the Mongol Empire, and the Georgian crown was required to pay an annual tribute and provide troops for Mongol military campaigns.

==== Mongol yoke ====
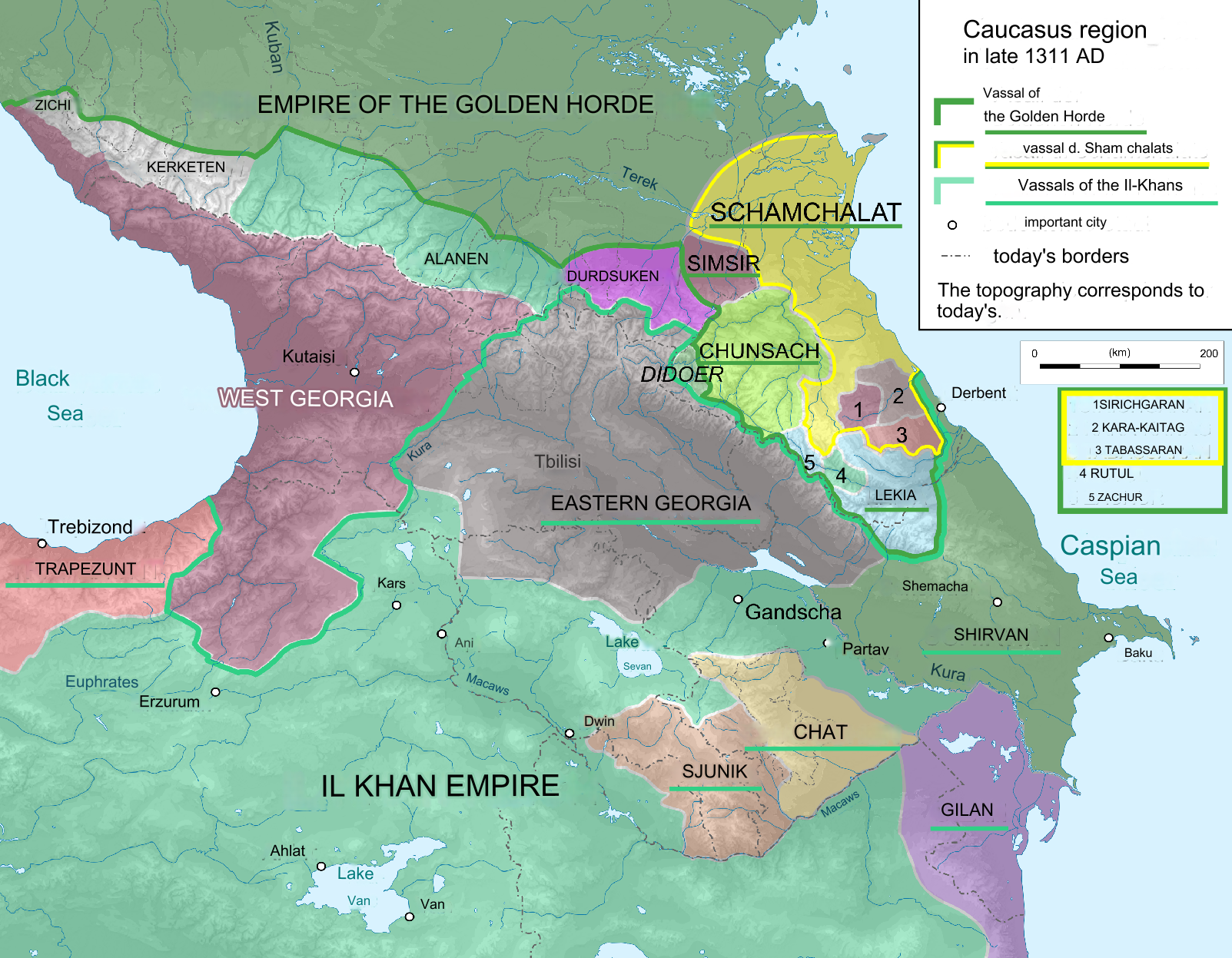
Map of the kingdoms of Western and Eastern Georgia

Following Rusudan's death in 1245, a succession dispute broke out over the Georgian throne. The Georgian nobles split into two factions, each backing a different claimant: David VII, the illegitimate son of George IV, and his cousin David VI, Rusudan's son. In 1247, the Mongols recognized both claimants as co-kings.

Georgian troops served in the Mongol armies and took part in several major campaigns. They participated in the siege of Alamut in 1256, the capture of Baghdad in 1258, and the campaign against the Mamluks in 1260. Georgian contingents were valued for their military skills and were frequently placed in the vanguard. According to Benedict of Poland, the Mongols held the Georgians in high regard, considering them a strong and warlike people.

In 1259, David VI rebelled against Mongol rule. After the uprising was suppressed, he withdrew to western Georgia and established his base in Kutaisi. He consolidated his control over the territories west of the Likhi Range, establishing a kingdom beyond the direct control of the Mongols. Georgia was thus divided into two political entities: the Kingdom of Eastern Georgia, which remained under Mongol suzerainty, and the Kingdom of Western Georgia, ruled independently by David VI. The division lasted for several decades, and the two kingdoms were eventually reunited after Mongol influence in Georgia came to an end.

==== George V the Brilliant ====
Territory of Georgia during the reign of King George V

In 1334, Shaykh Hasan of the Jalayir was appointed governor of Georgia by Abu Sa'id Khan. Young and politically weak, Abu Sa'id could not stop the decline of the Ilkhanid state. In 1335, following his death without a successor, the Ilkhanate fell into a state of civil war and was divided into several states. George V took full advantage of the situation. He stopped paying tribute to the Mongols, expelled their army from the country, and successfully restored the country's former strength and Christian culture.

During his reign, Armenian lands, including Ani, were part of the Kingdom of Georgia.

In the 1330s, George secured the southwestern province of Klarjeti against advancing Ottoman tribesmen led by Orhan I. In 1341, he intervened in the power struggle in the neighbouring Empire of Trebizond and supported Anna Anachoutlou, who ascended the throne with the help of the Laz, only to be put to death a year later. He also organized a successful campaign against Shirvan, a neighbouring state of Georgia.

The restoration of Georgia's unity, liberation from Mongol domination, and establishment of order in the country contributed to the revival of its economy. Trade and craft production developed significantly in Georgian cities. Trade and economic relations were restored not only with cities in the Middle East and the North but also with European city-states, particularly those in Northern Italy.

George V maintained friendly relations with King Philip VI of France, as evidenced by their correspondence. George V wrote to the King of France that he was ready to participate alongside him in the liberation of the "Holy Lands" of Syria-Palestine and that he had 30,000 soldiers at his disposal.

The widespread use of the Jerusalem cross in medieval Georgia, which inspired the modern national flag of Georgia, is thought to date back to the reign of George V.

==== Black Death ====
One of the primary reasons of Georgian political and military decline was the bubonic plague. It was first introduced in 1346 by the soldiers of George the Brilliant returning from a military expedition in south-western Georgia against invading Osmanli tribesmen. It is said that the plague wiped out a large part, if not half of the Georgian populace. This further weakened the integrity of the kingdom, as well as its military and logistic capabilities.

==== Timurid invasions ====
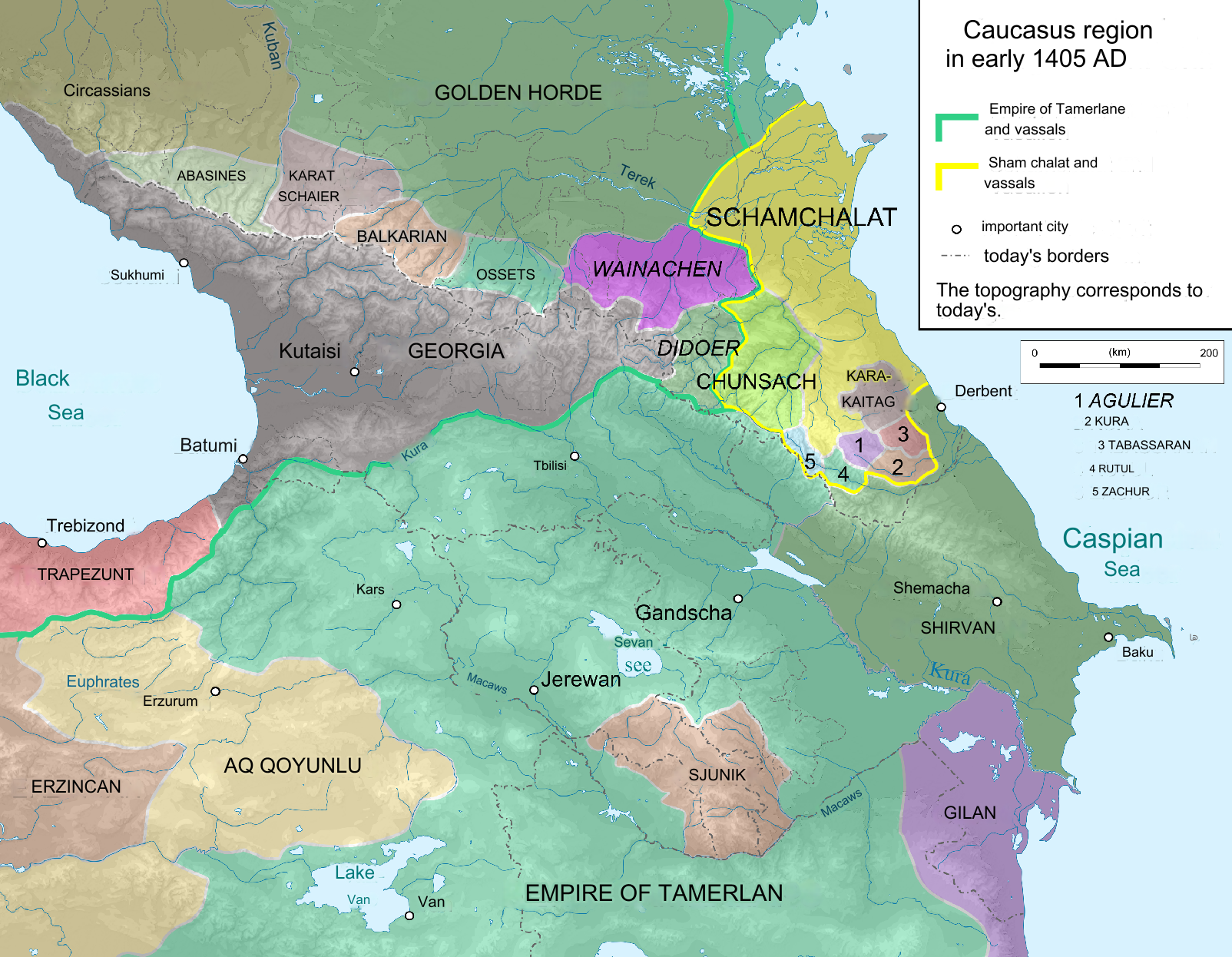
Caucasus Region, 1405

Between 1386 and 1403, Timur launched several military campaigns against the Kingdom of Georgia. The invasions were prompted in part by the kingdom's strategic position in the Caucasus and King Bagrat V of Georgia's friendly relations with the Golden Horde, which was engaged in a prolonged conflict with Timur. The repeated campaigns caused widespread devastation, severely damaging Georgia's economy and population. Despite the scale of the destruction, the Georgian kingdom survived the invasions and retained its statehood.

==== Turkmen invasions ====
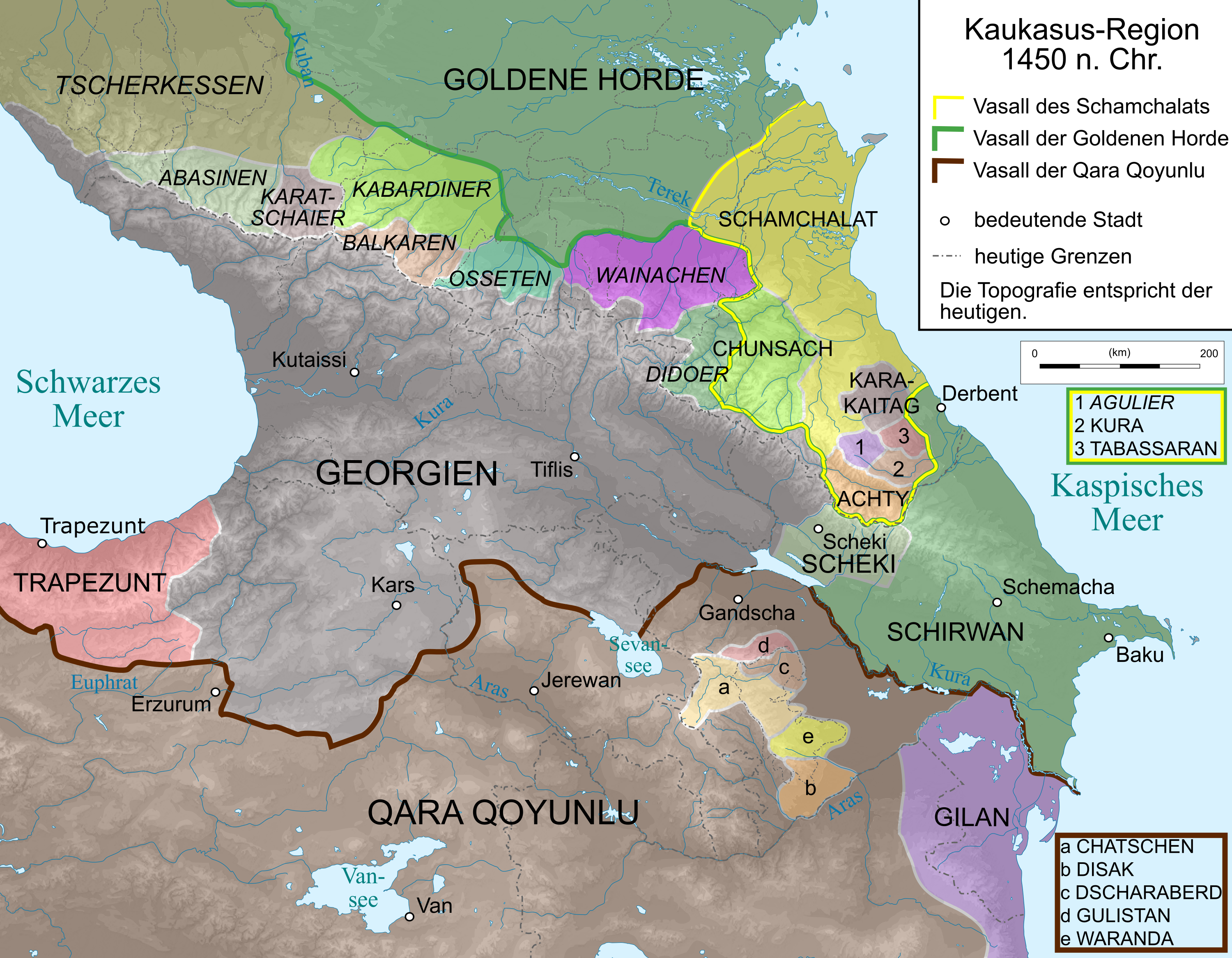
Caucasus Region, 1460

Following Timur's invasions of Georgia, the country came under renewed attack from the Kara Koyunlu. After Timur's death in 1405, the Kara Koyunlu consolidated their power under Qara Yusuf, who extended his rule into western Persia. Constantine I of Georgia, in alliance with Ibrahim I of Shirvan, attempted to resist the Turkoman advance but was defeated and captured at the Battle of Chalagan. Qara Yusuf subsequently ordered the execution of Constantine, his half-brother David, and 300 Georgian nobles.

Alexander I of Georgia, who sought to strengthen and restore his declining kingdom, faced constant invasions by the Turkoman tribes. In 1431, Alexander recovered Lori and other lands previously lost to the Turkomans. In about 1434–1435, he assisted the Armenian prince Beshken II Orbelian in a campaign against the Kara Koyunlu and granted him Lori as a vassal possession following his victory. In 1440, after Alexander refused to pay tribute, Jahan Shah invaded Georgia, capturing and sacking Samshvilde and Tbilisi. He launched another expedition in 1444, but his forces failed to achieve a decisive victory against the army of Vakhtang IV near Akhaltsikhe.

Following the dissolution of the unified Kingdom of Georgia after 1466, the country was divided into several political entities. The Aq Qoyunlu, a Turkoman confederation that had replaced the Kara Koyunlu, took advantage of Georgia's fragmentation and invaded under Uzun Hasan in 1466 and 1472, possibly launching another campaign in 1476–1477. Bagrat VI of Georgia was forced to surrender Tbilisi, which the Georgians recovered after Uzun Hasan's death in 1478. In 1489, the Aq Qoyunlu, led by Halil Bey, captured the capital after a prolonged siege. During the invasion, Alexander II of Imereti established control over Imereti, while Constantine II of Georgia eventually expelled the invaders from Tbilisi. In 1502, Ismail I, founder of the Safavid dynasty, allied with the Georgians and defeated the Aq Qoyunlu, bringing their invasions to an end.

=== Final disintegration ===
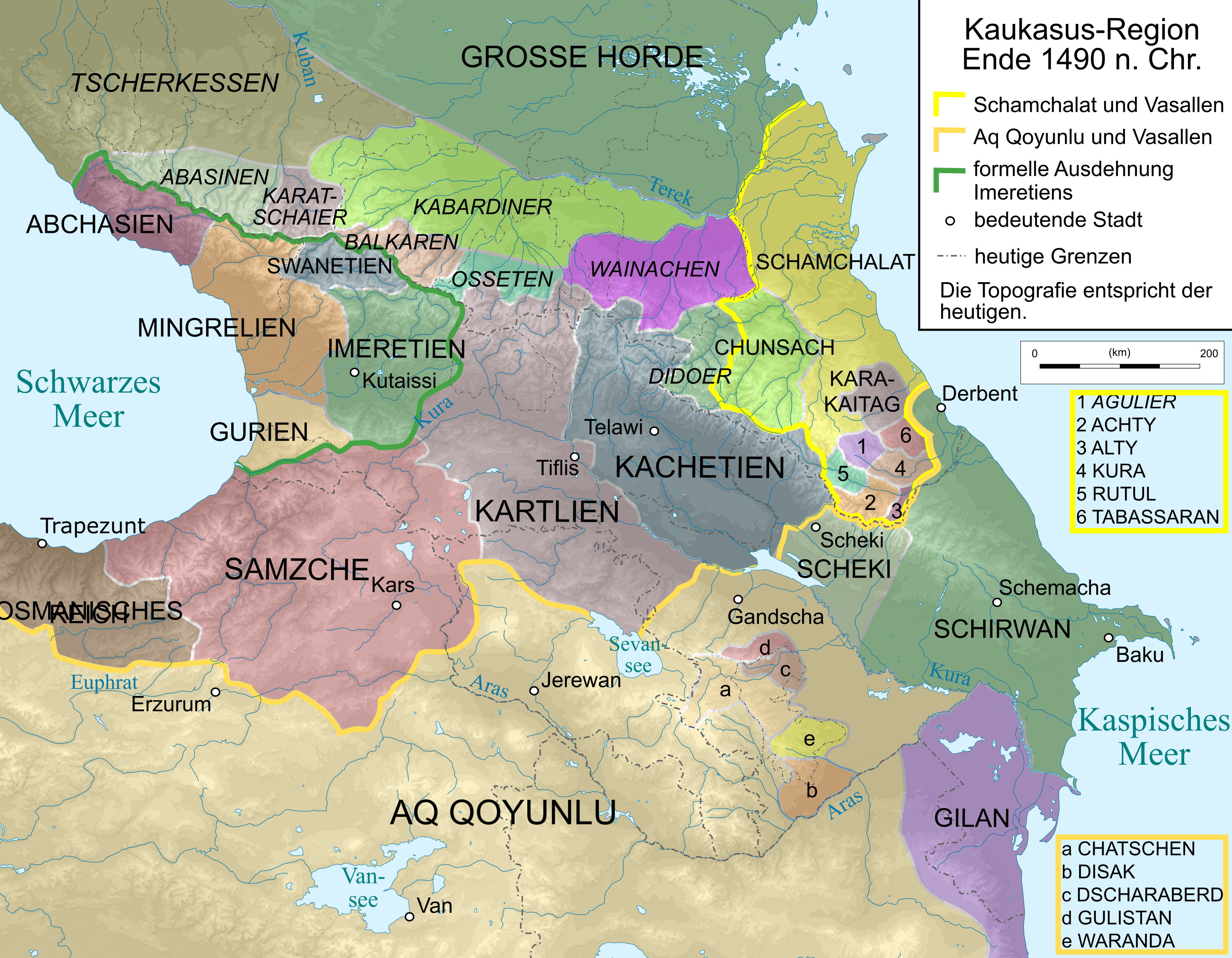
Caucasus Region, 1490

In 1433, King Alexander I of Georgia appointed his three sons, Demetrius, Vakhtang and George, as co-kings. The decision was intended to strengthen royal authority over the kingdom's provinces and secure the succession, following the Byzantine practice of appointing heirs to the imperial throne as co-emperors. Although Alexander sought to accommodate the claims of all his sons while preserving the unity of the kingdom, the arrangement ultimately had the opposite effect. Rather than preventing dynastic rivalries, it contributed to the weakening of central authority and, after his death, to the eventual disintegration of the kingdom.

Following the death of his elder brother Vakhtang IV in 1446, George VIII ascended the throne of Georgia. His reign was marked by growing opposition from powerful regional nobles, who increasingly challenged the authority of the crown. The principality of Samtskhe, ruled by the Jaqeli dynasty, had already become largely autonomous, while rival claims to the throne further weakened the monarchy.

The conflict escalated when Bagrat VI, a cousin of George VIII and a member of the Imeretian branch of the Bagrationi dynasty, challenged the king's authority. With the support of several powerful western Georgian nobles, Bagrat launched a rebellion against the crown. In 1463, he defeated George VIII at the Battle of Chikhori, subsequently taking control of much of western Georgia and proclaiming himself King of Imereti.

In 1465, George VIII was captured by Qvarqvare II Jaqeli, the atabeg of Samtskhe, following a military confrontation near Lake Paravani. Taking advantage of the king's captivity, Bagrat entered Tbilisi in 1466 and proclaimed himself King of Georgia as Bagrat VI. Following his release, George was unable to recover the throne and withdrew to Kakheti, where he established a separate kingdom and ruled as George I of Kakheti until his death in 1476. His withdrawal marked the emergence of Kakheti as an independent monarchy, while Bagrat VI retained control over much of western and central Georgia.

The fragmentation of the Georgian monarchy continued under the succeeding rulers. By the end of the 15th century, the former unified kingdom had effectively divided into three independent kingdoms: Kartli, Kakheti and Imereti. Several regional principalities, including Samtskhe, Mingrelia and Guria, also exercised considerable autonomy. In 1490, King Constantine II of Georgia convened a royal council to discuss the possibility of restoring the unity of the kingdom. Following the council's recommendation, he accepted the existing political divisions, formally acknowledging the separate Georgian kingdoms and principalities. This decision marked the recognition of the political fragmentation that had developed over the preceding decades.

== Government and society ==
=== Numismatics ===
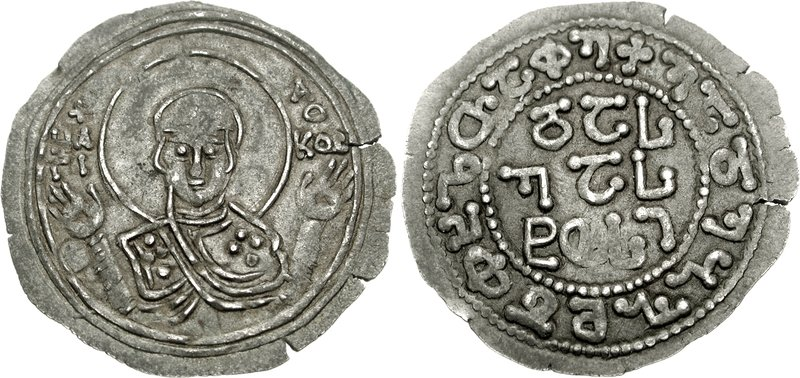
A coin minted during the reign of Bagrat IV, bearing Georgian and Greek inscriptions

Since Georgia uses unique scripts that are not understood by any other country in the world, Georgian coinage was often multilingual, featuring additional inscriptions in the languages of its trading partners. For example, Bagrat IV's (r.1027–1072) coins featured Greek inscriptions alongside Georgian. (Note: "...Islam was now only a relic on Georgian soil: Bagrat IV's coins have the Virgin and a Greek inscription on the obverse, with Georgian initials on the reverse, but no Arabic...") During the reigns of Demetrius I, George III, David IV, and Queen Tamar, coins were also minted bearing Arabic, which was, according to Brosset, used as a lingua franca because of the importance of trade relations with the Islamic world. This was both a gesture of goodwill towards its Muslim subjects and an economic decision to ensure coins' wide circulation. Georgian monarchs often used foreign language inscriptions on their coins for strategic messaging to other nations and to assert their own status, such as announcing themselves as the "Sword of Messiah".

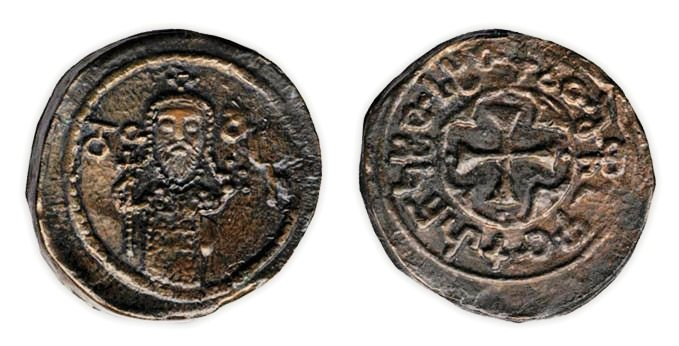
Coin of David IV, featuring the distinctive cross that forms part of the Georgian flag

Demetrius I's (r.1125–1154) reign exclusively struck copper coins. There are several recognized patterns in his coinage, which eschewed Byzantine conventions in favor of a hybrid Georgian-Muslim style. The reverse of one version includes the name of the Caliph of Baghdad due to political expediency, while the obverse features the king's initial "D" in Georgian ecclesiastical majuscule together with his title "Sword of the Messiah" in Arabic. Copper coins belonging to George IV (r.1213–1223) carry the year 1210 (430 in the K'oronikon), indicating that during this time his mother gave George a significant amount of royal authority. The reverse of the coin is similar to Tamar's irregular issue, but in the center is an inscription in ecclesiastical majuscules that reads "GI DZE T'MRSI", which is an acronym for "Giorgi, son of T'amar". The Arabic inscription on the back illustrates George's name and titles.

It is significant that only copper was minted in Georgia beginning under the rule of Demetrius I. This was the outcome of the silver famine that was raging over the Near East during this time. It was not until the thirteenth century that this famine was ended. Large amounts of silver were brought to the Middle East after the Mongol invasion of China in 1213, where it was captured and circulated by the trading public. When the silver supply in Georgia was restored, Queen Rusudan (r.1223–1245) was able to modify the coinage by issuing her renowned "Botinats" in 1230. The Arabic legend of this series frequently transliterates the Queen's name as "Rusūdān", whereas her copper coins have "Rūsudān" on the description of Rusudan's silver coin from 1230.

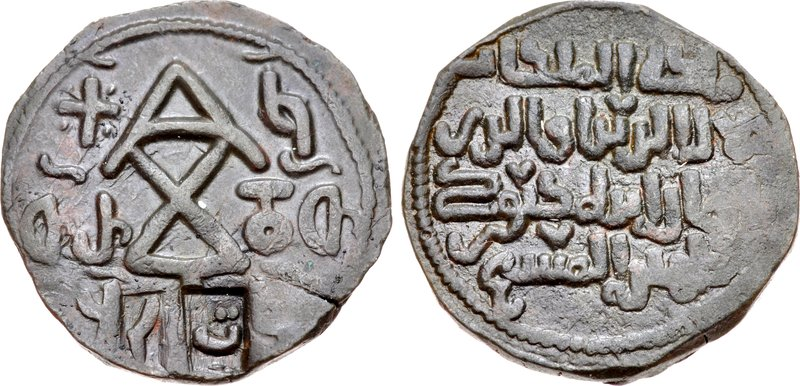
A coin minted during the reign of Queen Tamar, bearing Georgian and Arabic inscriptions

Georgian coins showed signs of foreign influence when the kingdom of Georgia came under the Mongol rule in the late 13th and early 14th centuries, combining inscriptions in Georgian, Arabic, and Persian. During the regency of Töregene Khatun (r.1244–1245), silver dirhems minted at Tbilisi stated "The Great Mongol Alush (Ulush) Bek", which has been interpreted as "[Money issued by] the Great Mongol Viceroy (Supreme Commander)." During this same time, the son of Rusudan, David VI (r.1245–1259), was minting copper coins at Dmanisi, with production moving to Tbilisi by 1247. David VI's obverse consisted of, the king on a horse (left side); below are some bushes and dark objects that could be hounds, while the reverse has inscriptions in Persian. David VI ruled with his cousin David VII (r.1248–1259) whose coins were minted in Tbilisi starting in 1252, which state, "David, son of Giorgi, Bagrationi, vassal of the Mongol Great Khan Mangu". Both cousins issued a joint silver coin of Byzantine type in which the reverse features the Holy Virgin, while the obverse features the kings standing together. These coins, which are quite rare, were most likely produced at Kutaisi in 1261–62, following David VII's rebellion, flight from the Mongol lords, and his subsequent shelter in Western Georgia with David VI.

=== Religion and culture ===
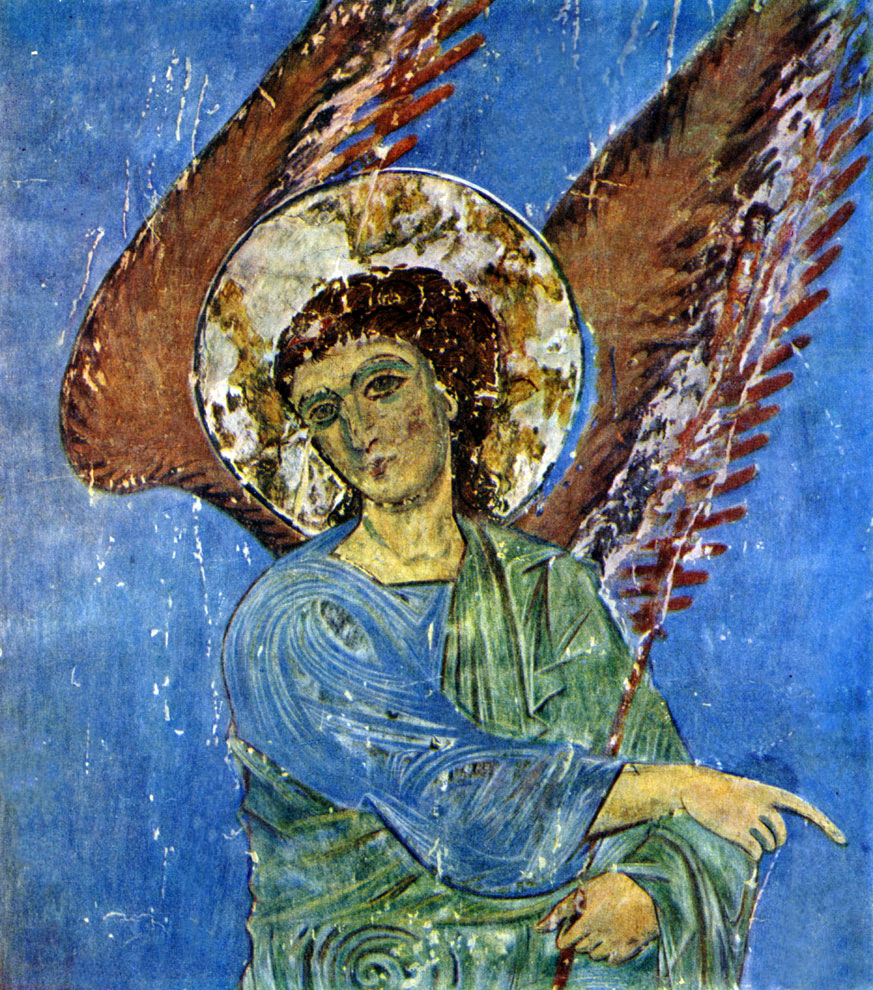
The Angel of Kintsvisi, painted with rare natural ultramarine, demonstrates the increasing resources of the realm.

Between the 11th and early 13th centuries, Georgia experienced a political, economic, and cultural golden age, as the Bagrationi dynasty managed to unite the western and eastern parts of the country into a single kingdom. To achieve this goal, the kings relied heavily on the prestige of the Church and secured its political support by granting it numerous economic privileges, tax exemptions, and extensive landed estates. At the same time, the kings, most notably David the Builder (1089–1125), used state power to intervene in church affairs. Notably, David convened the 1103 Council of Ruisi-Urbnisi, which condemned Armenian Miaphysitism in stronger terms than ever before and granted unprecedented authority, second only to that of the Patriarch, to his friend and advisor George of Chqondidi. For the following centuries, the Church remained a crucial feudal institution whose economic and political power was consistently at least equal to that of the leading noble families.

During the Middle Ages, Christianity was the central element of Georgian culture. Distinctive forms of art developed in Georgia for religious purposes. These included calligraphy, polyphonic church singing, cloisonné enamel icons, such as the Khakhuli triptych, and the so-called Georgian cross-domed architectural style, which characterizes most medieval Georgian churches. The most celebrated examples of Georgian religious architecture from this period include the Gelati Monastery and Bagrati Cathedral in Kutaisi, the Ikalto Monastery complex and Academy, and Svetitskhoveli Cathedral in Mtskheta.

Outstanding Georgian representatives of Christian culture include Euthymius of Athos (Ekvtime Atoneli, 955–1028), George of Athos (Giorgi Atoneli, 1009–1065), Arsen Ikaltoeli (11th century), and Ephrem Mtsire (11th century). Philosophy flourished between the 11th and 13th centuries, particularly at the Academy of Gelati Monastery, where Ioane Petritsi attempted to synthesize Christian, Aristotelian, and Neoplatonic thought.

Tamar's reign also marked the continuation of the artistic development initiated by her predecessors. Although contemporary Georgian chronicles continued to uphold Christian morality, religious themes gradually began to lose their previously dominant position to highly original secular literature. This trend culminated in an epic poem written by Georgia's national poet, Rustaveli, entitled The Knight in the Panther's Skin (Vepkhistq'aosani). Revered in Georgia as the greatest achievement of its native literature, the poem celebrates the medieval humanistic ideals of chivalry, friendship, and courtly love.

==== Missionary activities ====
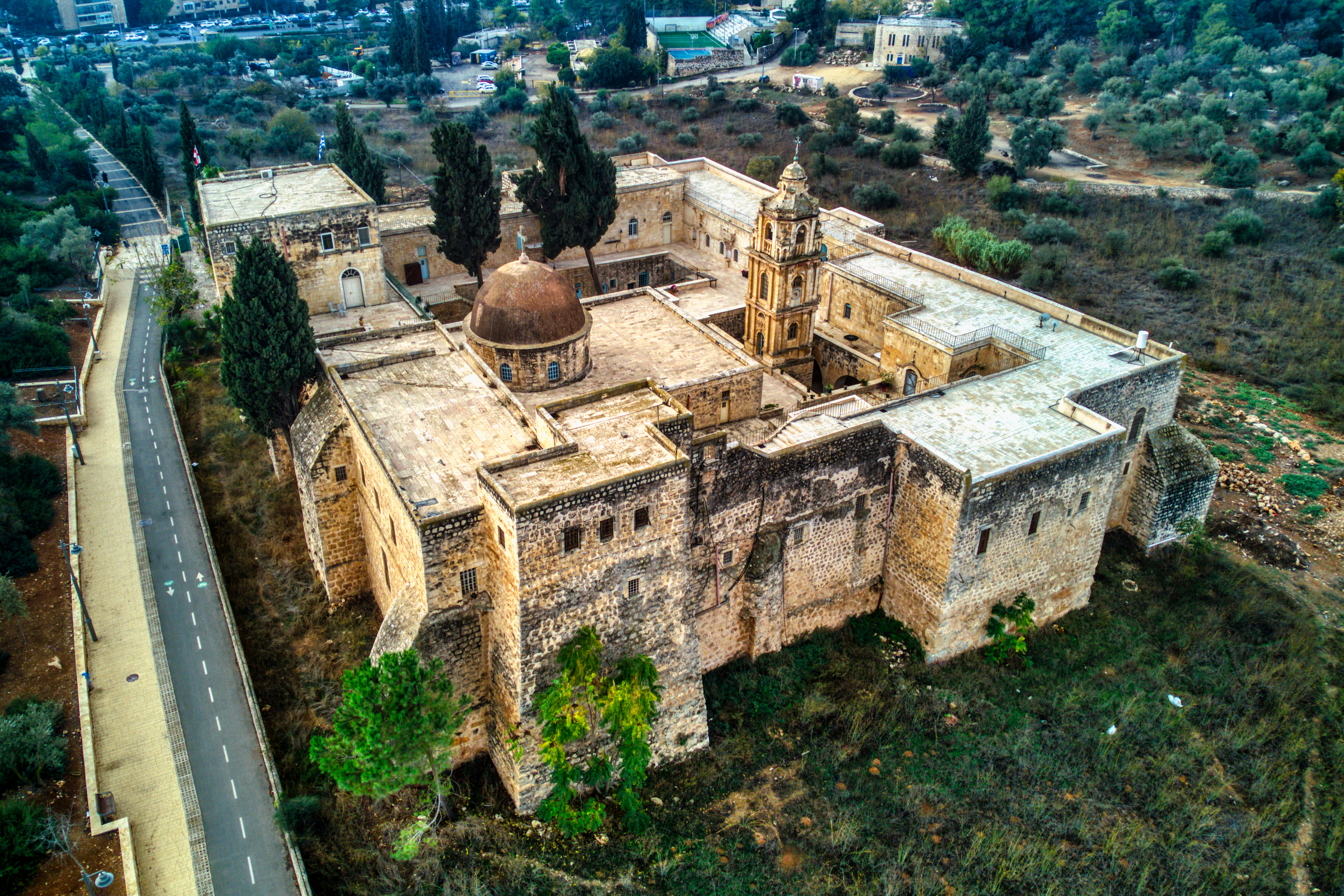
Monastery of the Cross in Jerusalem

The golden age of Georgian monasticism lasted from the 9th to the 11th century. During this period, Georgian monasteries and centers of religious scholarship were established beyond the country's borders, including in the Balkans (e.g., Bachkovo Monastery), on Mount Sinai (Saint Catherine's Monastery), on Mount Athos (Iviron Monastery, where the Theotokos Iverskaya icon is still located), and in Jerusalem (Monastery of the Cross). From the 10th century onward, Georgians also began to play a significant role in spreading Christianity throughout the mountainous regions of the Caucasus. This is corroborated not only by historical sources but also by Christian architectural monuments bearing Georgian inscriptions, which can still be found throughout the North Caucasus, including in Chechnya, Ingushetia, Dagestan, North Ossetia, and Kabardino-Balkaria.

== Legacy ==
=== Artistic inheritance ===
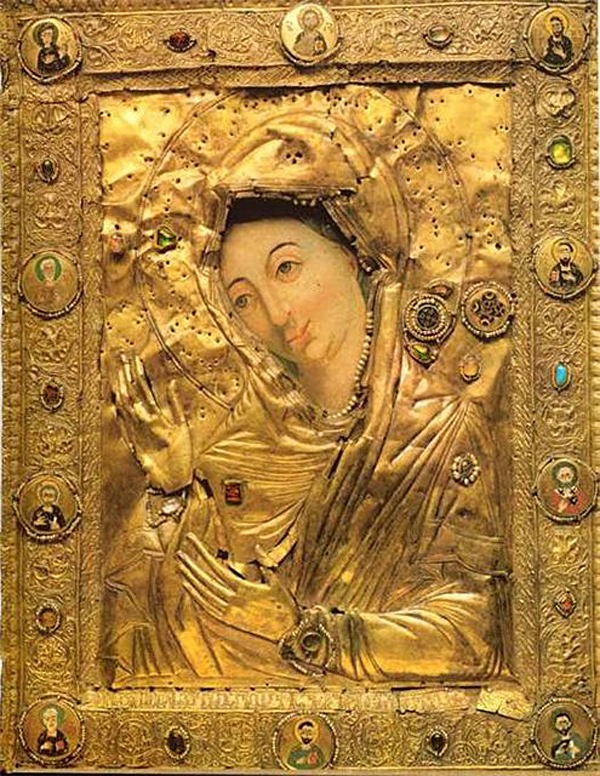
Golden Theotokos of Khobi Monastery, with some precious stones taken by the communists

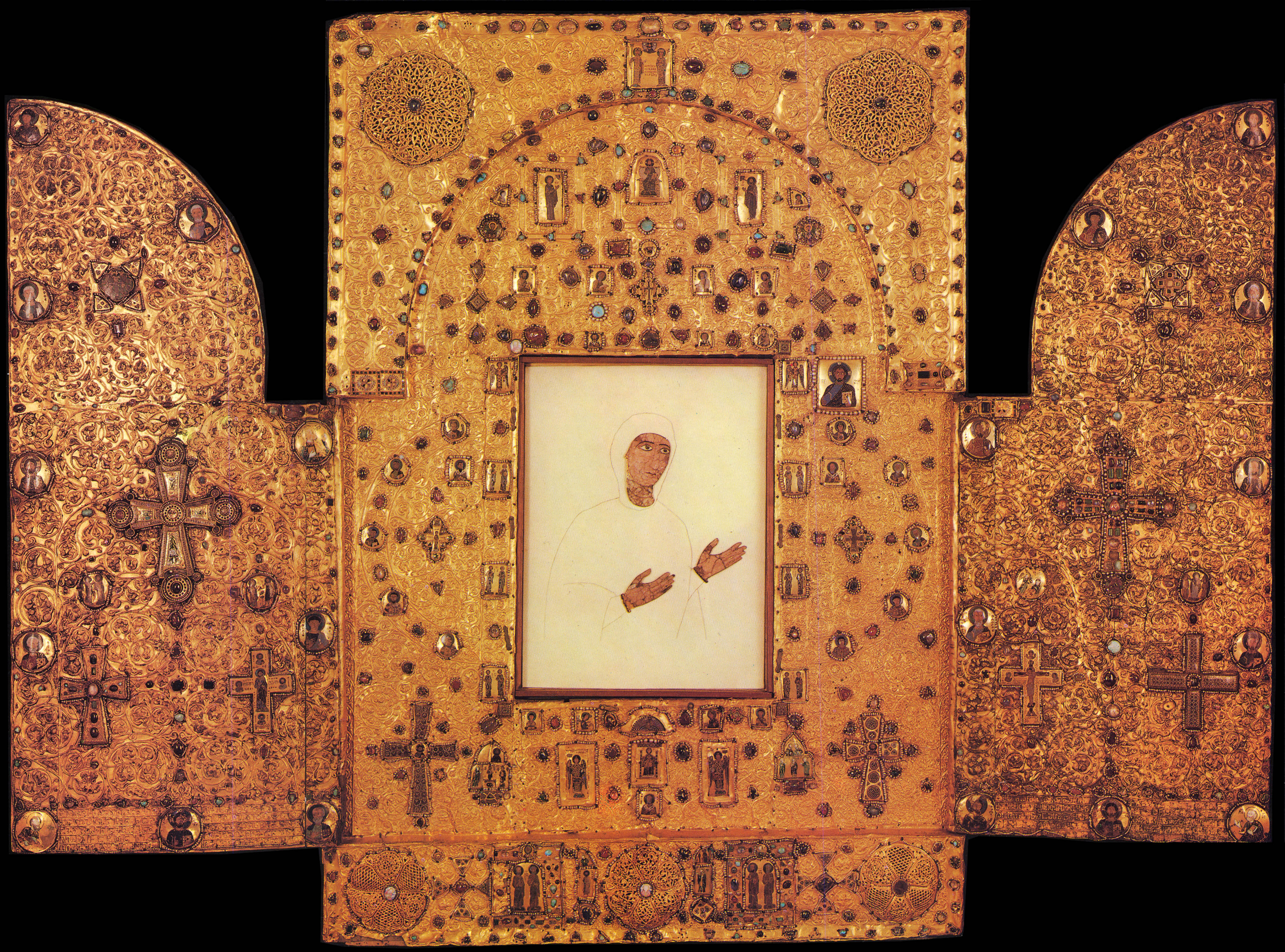
Triptych of Khakhuli

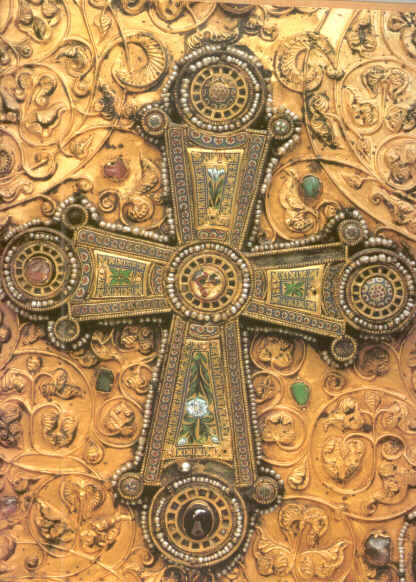
Detail of the Khakhuli Triptych

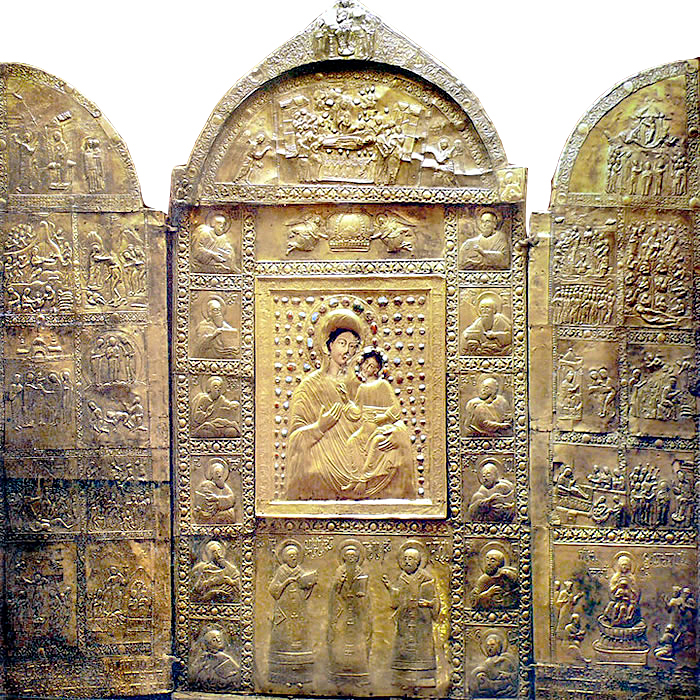
Atskuri Triptych

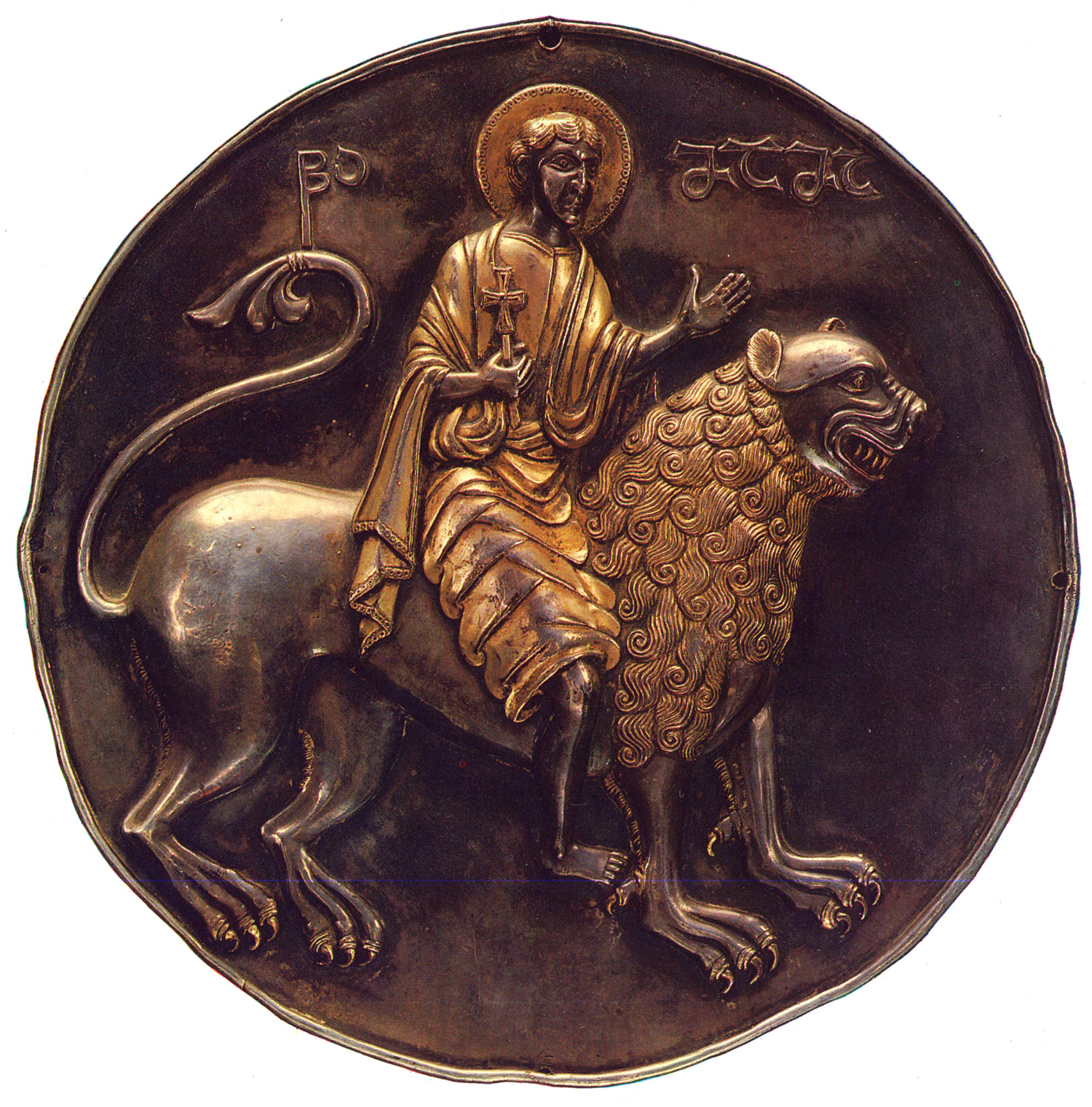
Georgian tondo commemorating Roman martyr Mammes of Caesarea

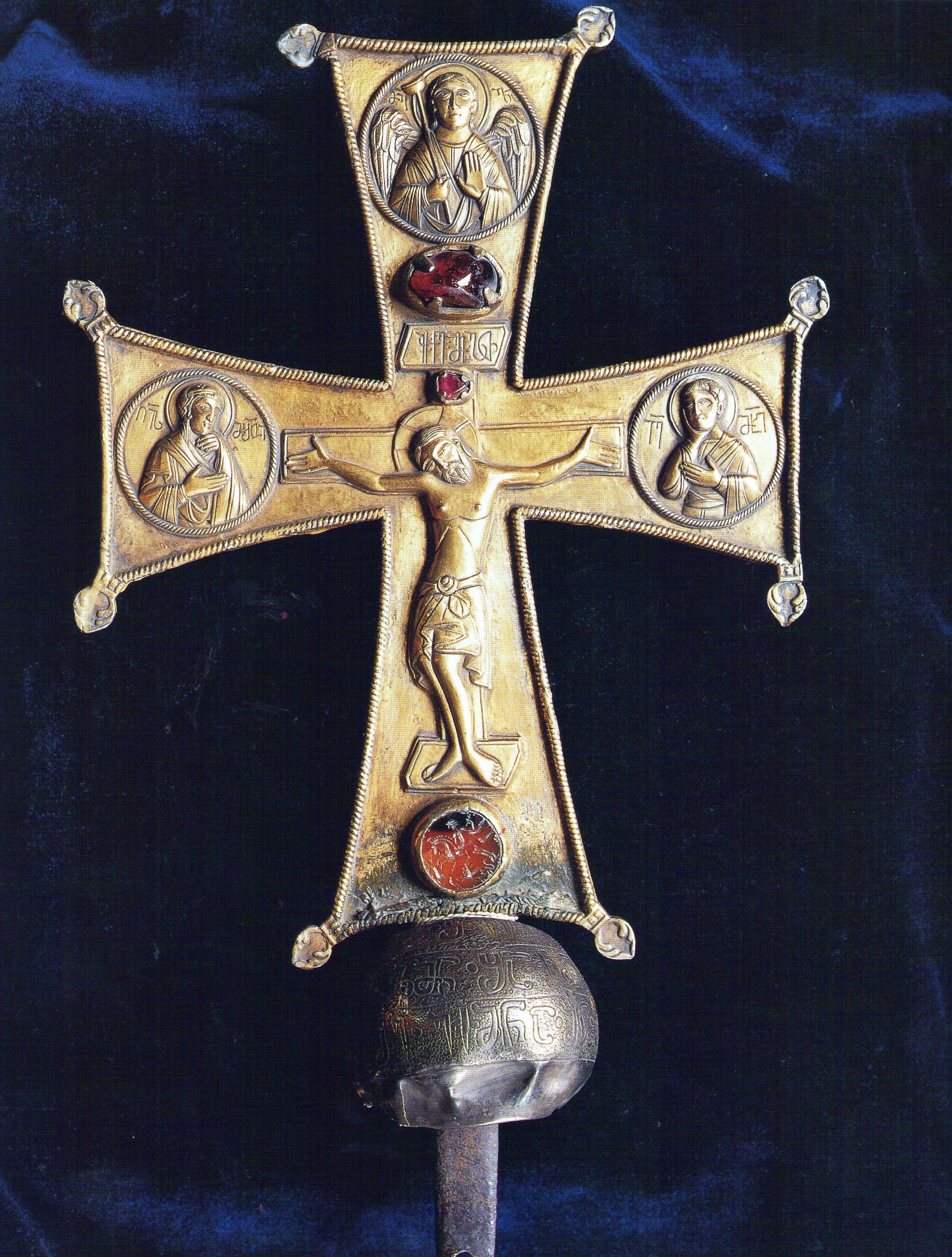
David IV's processional cross

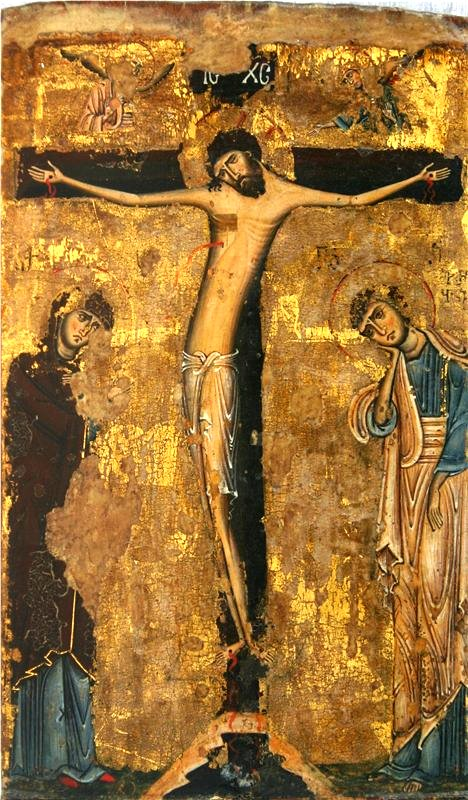
Crucifixion from Mestia

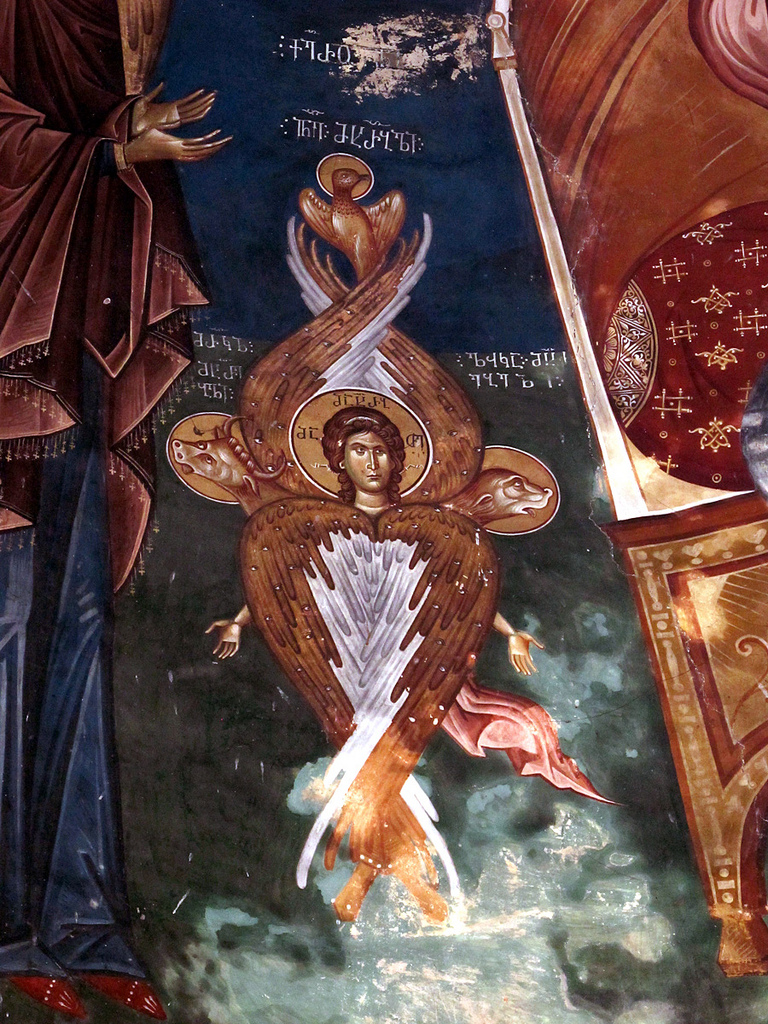
Fresco from Ubisi, Georgia

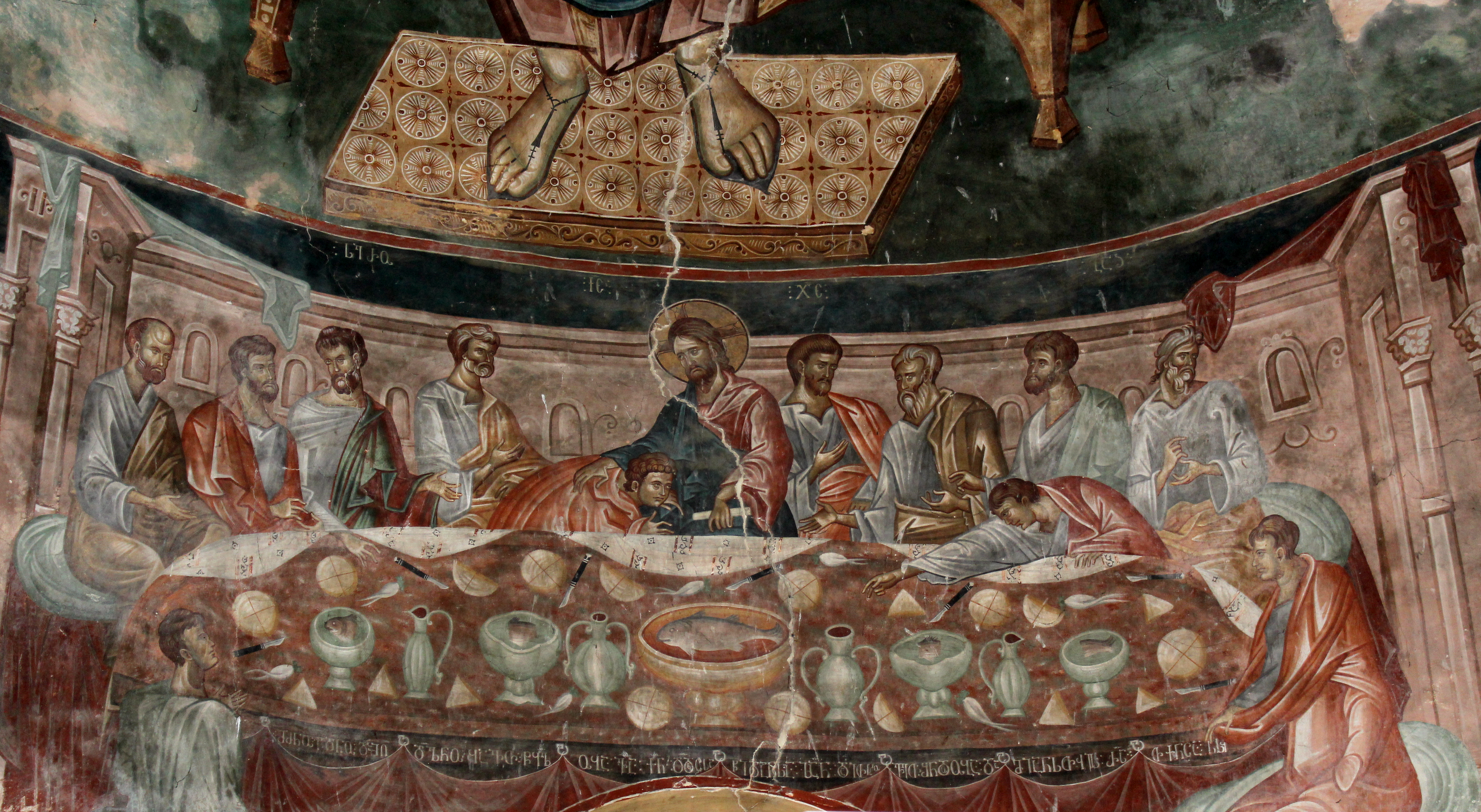
The Last Supper of Ubisi

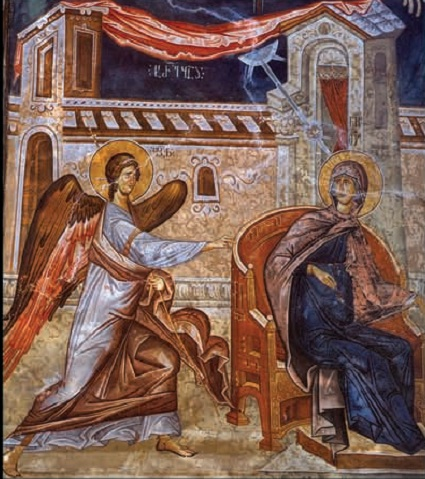
Annunciation of Ubisi

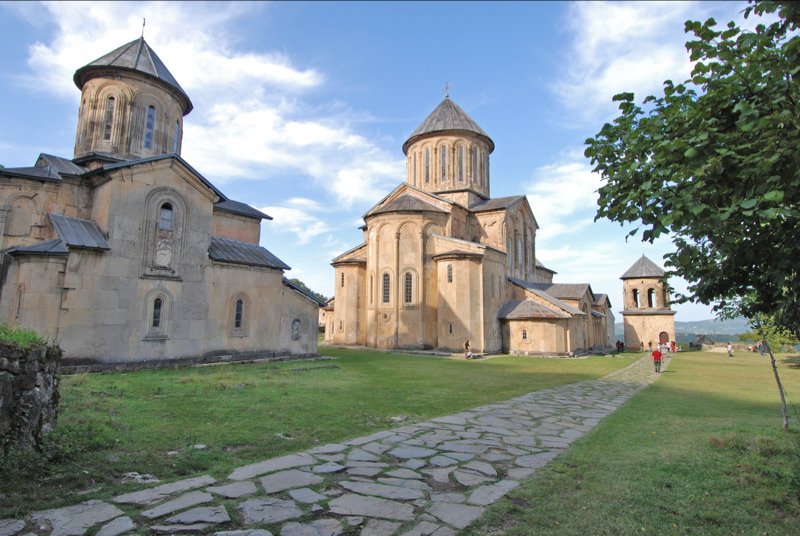
Gelati Monastery

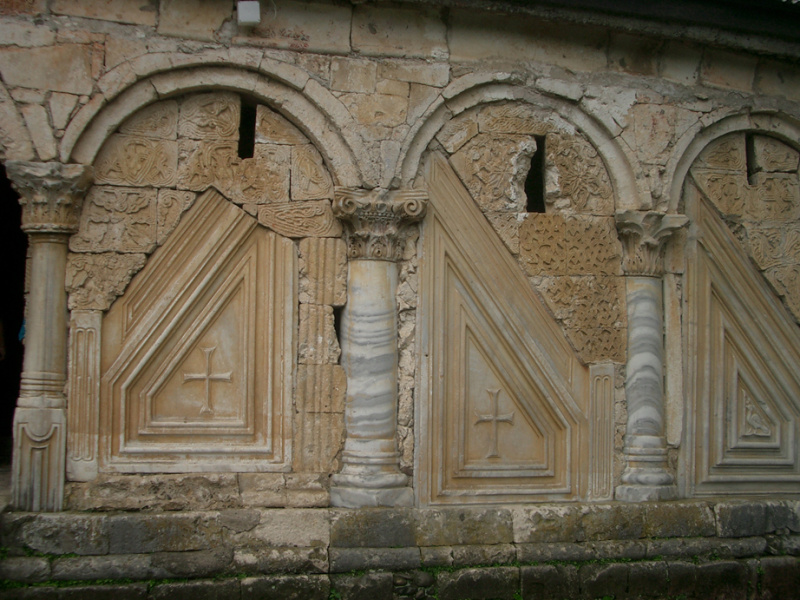
Walls of the Khobi Monastery showing strong Roman influence

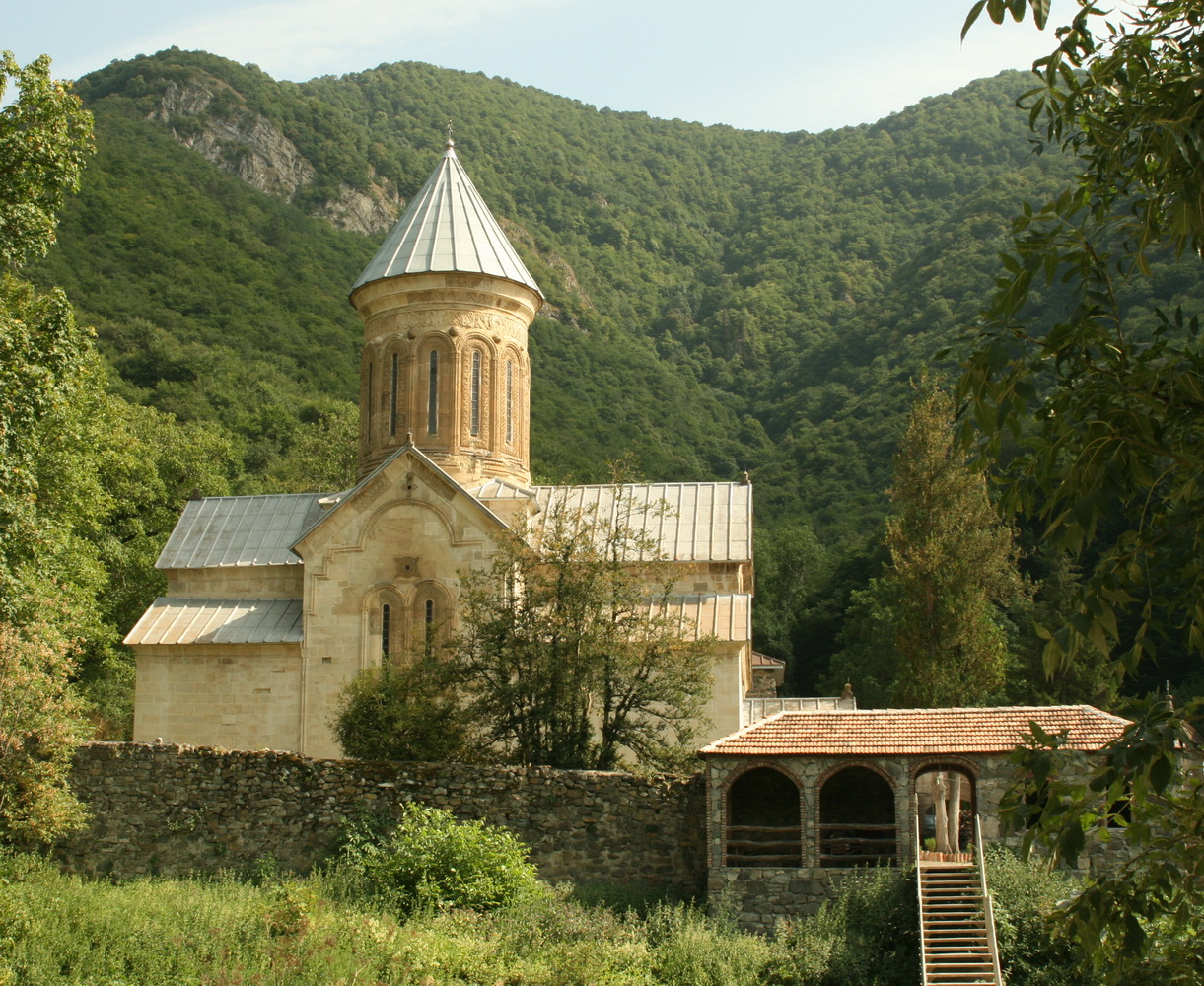
Kvatakhevi monastery

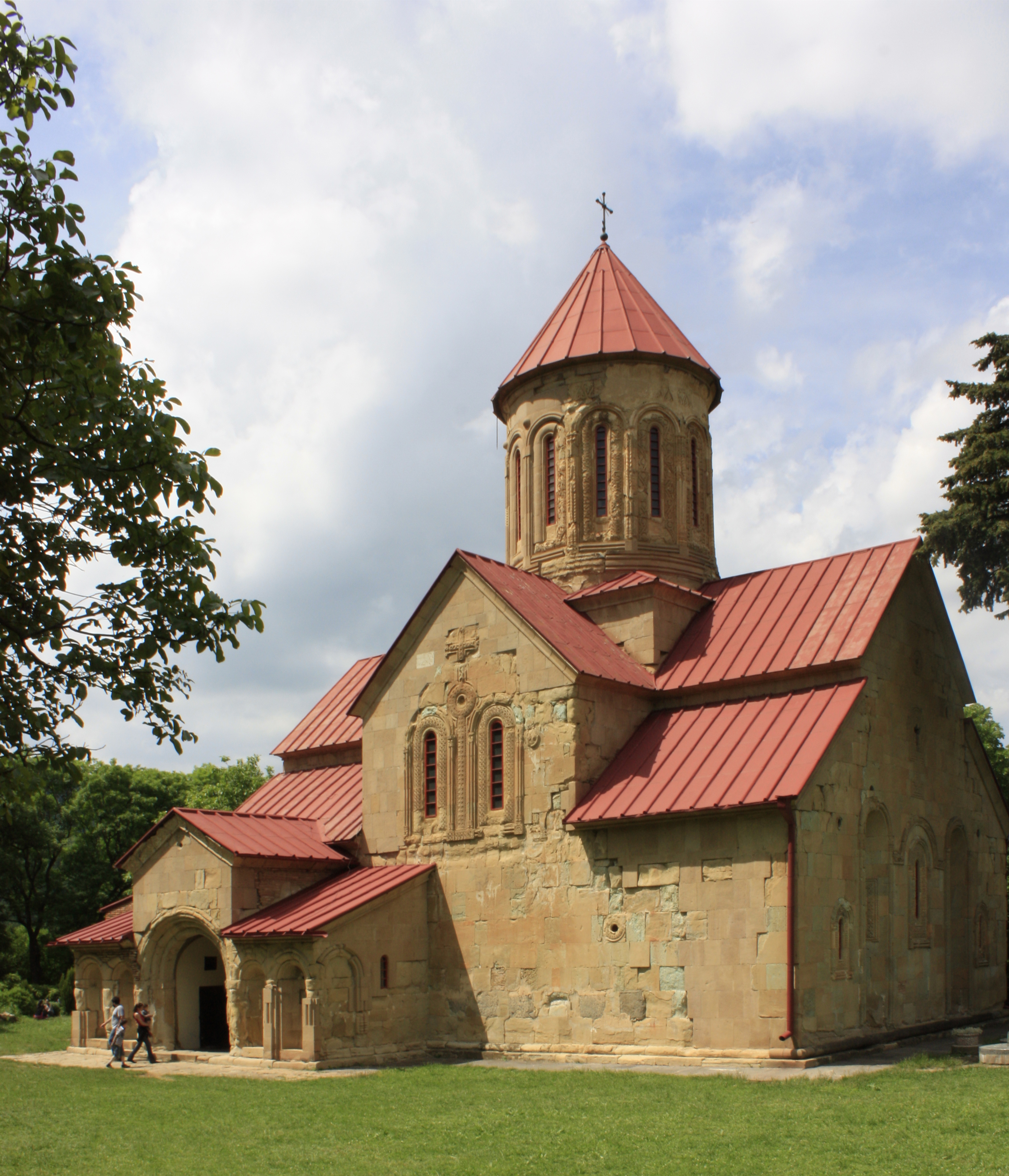
Betania Monastery

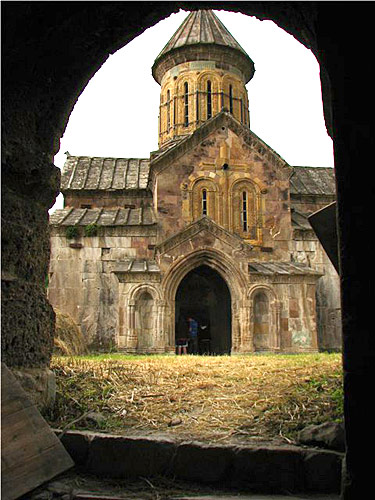
Pitareti Monastery

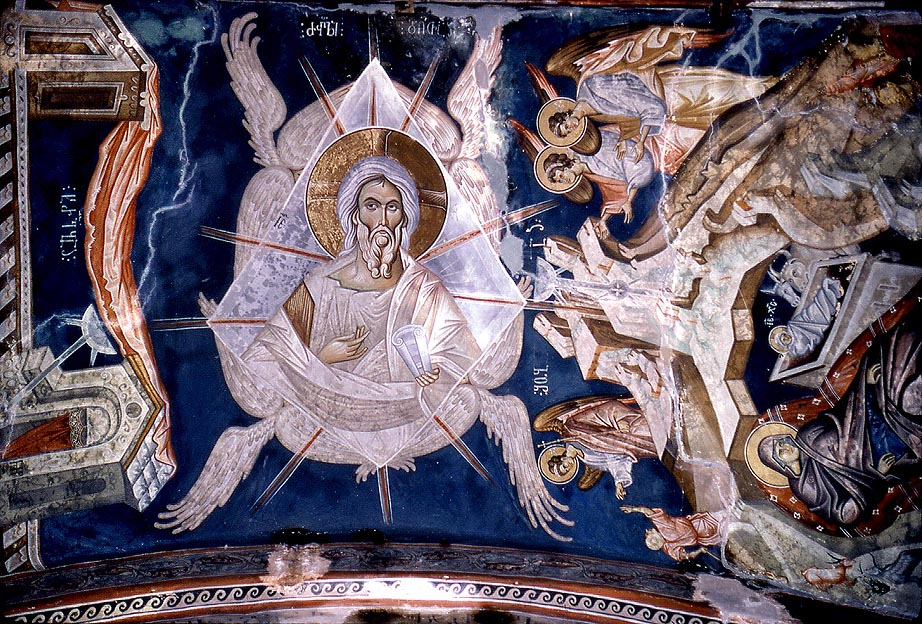
Despite setbacks at the hands of Mongols, Georgia continued to produce cultural landmarks, such as these frescoes at Ubisi by Damiane - one of Georgia's distinctive medieval artists.

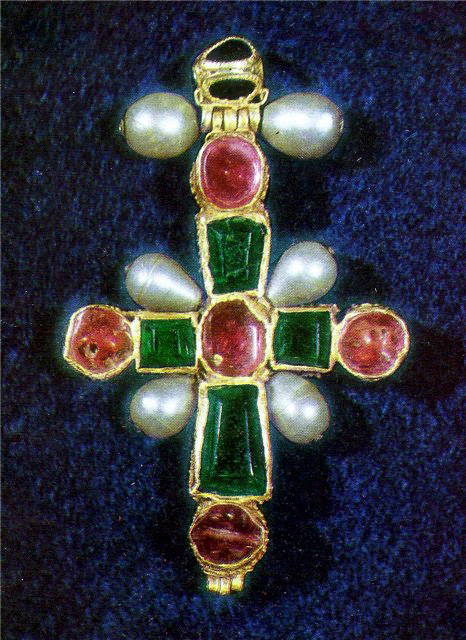
Golden cross of Queen Tamar, composed of rubies, emeralds, and large pearls

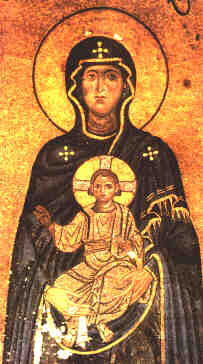
Gelati Theotokos. The use of costly mosaics in church decorations heralded Georgia's imperial ambitions.

Kazreti monastery

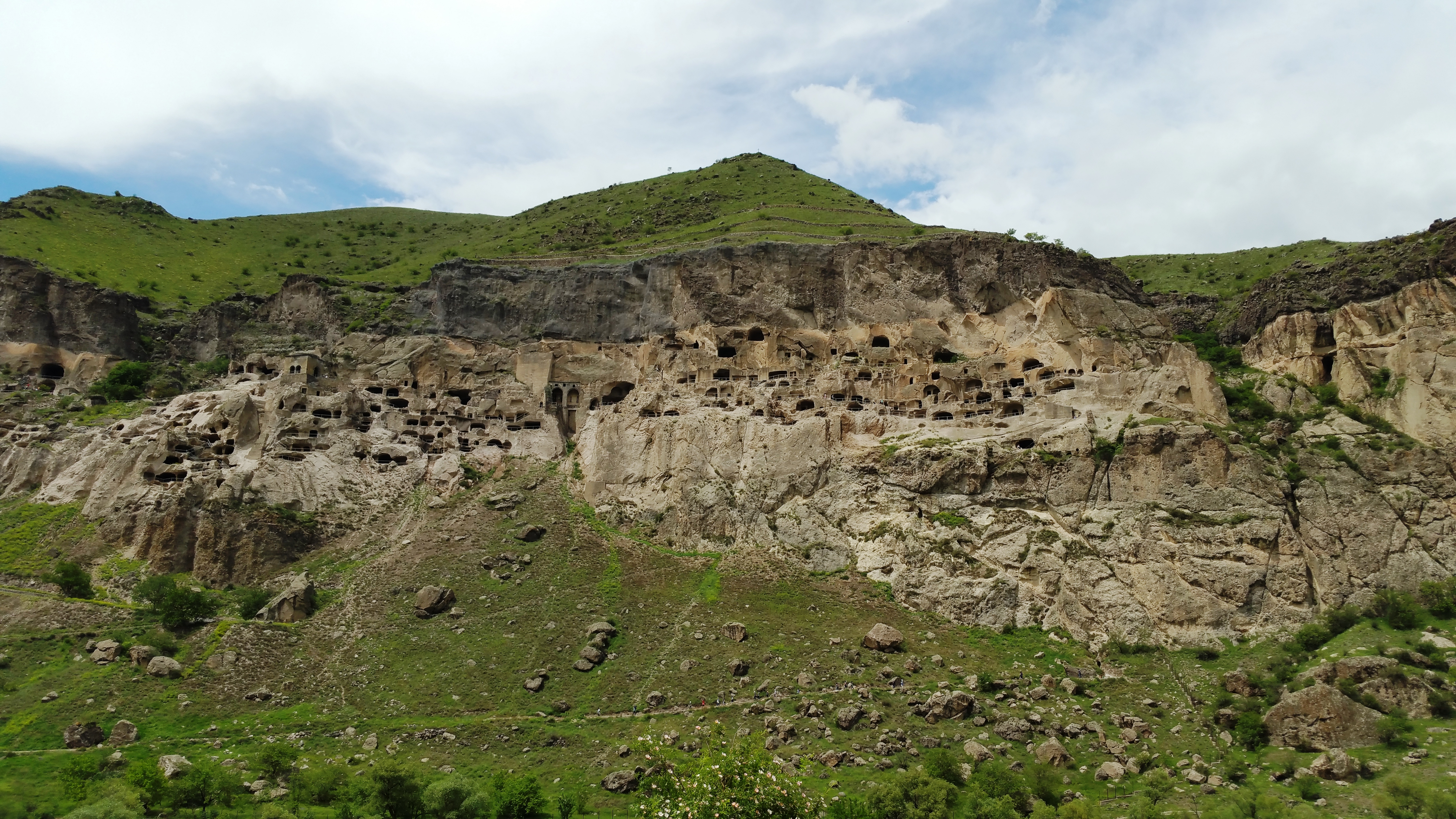
Vardzia

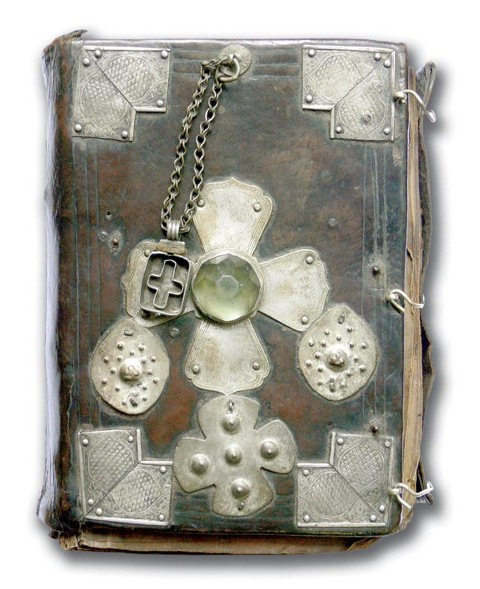
Anchi Gospel - 12th century gospel in Georgian language and Nuskhuri alphabet

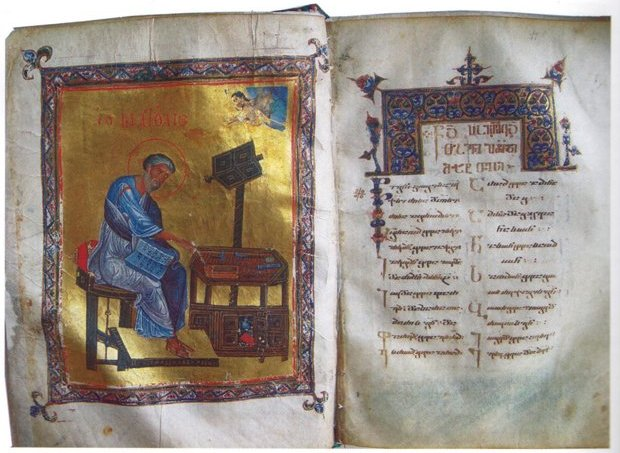
Alaverdi Gospel 1054, beginning of the gospel of Matthew

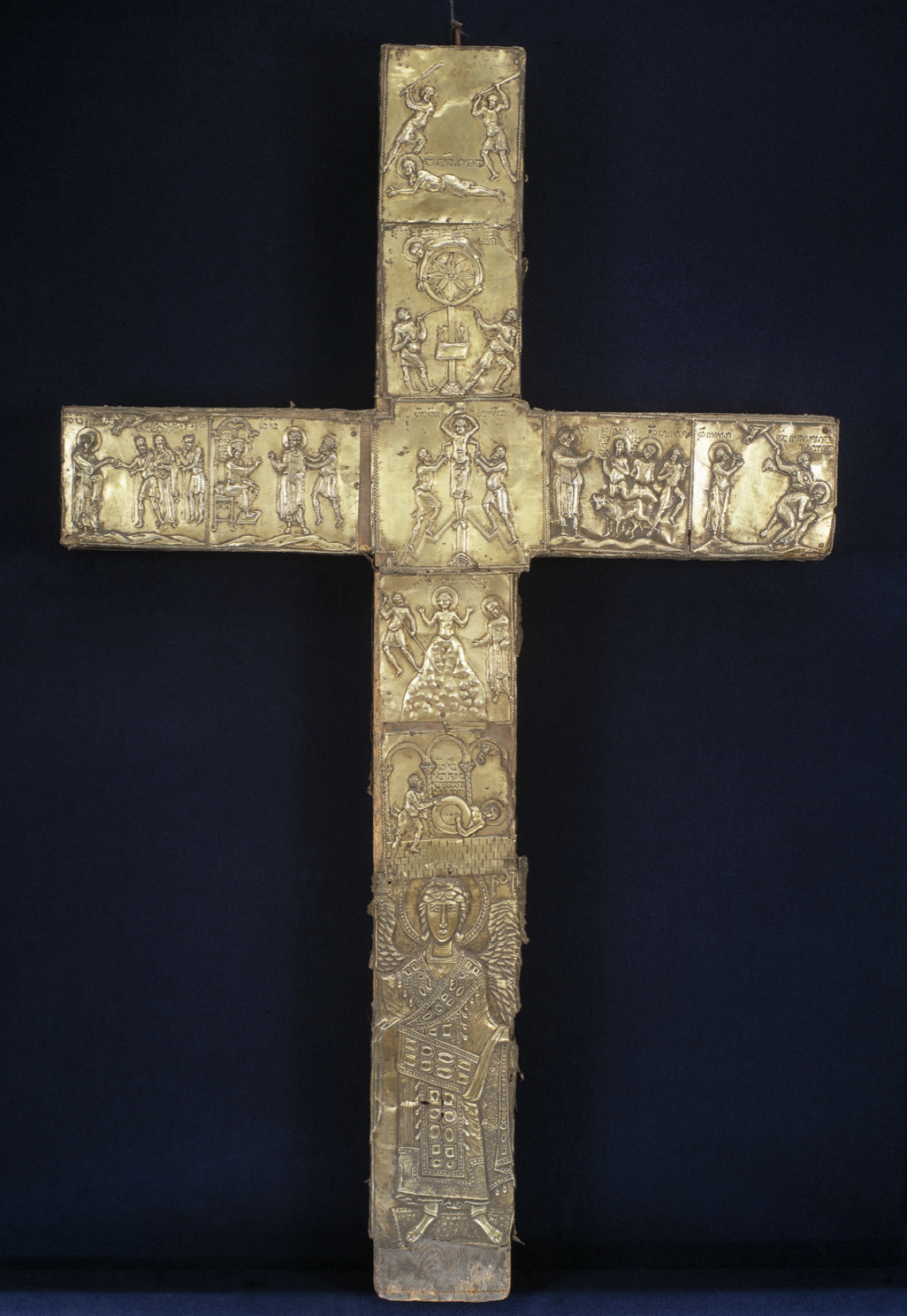
Pre-Altar Cross from Mestia, Church of Seti, ca. 1030

== See also ==
- List of the Kings of Georgia
  - Georgian monarchs family tree
- Monarchism in Georgia
- Style of the Georgian sovereign
- List of historical states of Georgia

== Bibliography ==
- Eastmond, Antony (1998). Royal Imagery in Medieval Georgia. University Park, Pennsylvania, USA: The Pennsylvania State University Press. ISBN 0-271-01628-0.
- Lang, David M. (1955). Studies in the Numismatic History of Georgia in Transcaucasia. The American Numismatic Society.
- Mikaberidze, Alexander (2019). "Georgian-Seljuk Wars (11th-13th centuries)". In Tucker, Spencer C. (ed.). Middle East Conflicts from Ancient Egypt to the 21st Century. Vol. II:G-N. ABC-CLIO. pp. 467–468.
- Minorsky, V. (1953). Studies in Caucasian History I. New Light on the Shaddadids of Ganja II. The Shaddadids of Ani III. Prehistory of Saladin. Cambridge University Press.
- Lordkipanidze, Mariam Davydovna; Hewitt, George B. (1987). Georgia in the XI–XII Centuries. Tbilisi: Ganatleba Publishers.
- Kuehn, Sara (2011). The Dragon in Medieval East Christian and Islamic Art. Leiden: Koninklijke Brill NV. ISBN 978-90-04-18663-7.
- Humphreys, R. Stephen (1977). From Saladin to the Mongols: The Ayyubids of Damascus, 1193–1260. Albany, NY: State University of New York Press. ISBN 0-87395-263-4.
- Mikaberidze, Alexander, ed. (2007). "Currency". Historical Dictionary of Georgia. The Scarecrow Press.
- Norris, Harry (2009). Islam in the Baltic: Europe's Early Muslim Community. I.B. Tauris.
- Rayfield, Donald (2013). Edge of Empires: A History of Georgia. Reaktion Books. ISBN 978-1-78023-070-2.
- Vacca, Alison (2017). Non-Muslim Provinces under Early Islam: Islamic Rule and Iranian Legitimacy in Armenia and Caucasian Albania. Cambridge University Press.
- Salia, Kalistrat (1980). Histoire de la nation géorgienne [History of the Georgian nation] (in French). Paris: Nino Salia.
