= Shen Khar Venakhi =

Medieval Georgian choral hymn

Thou Art a Vineyard (Georgian: შენ ხარ ვენახი, romanized: shen khar venakhi) is a medieval Georgian hymn. It is attributed to King Demetrius I of Georgia (1093–1156). Normally performed by a choir and without any musical accompaniment, it is an example of Georgian medieval polyphonic tradition.

== History and meaning ==
Thou Art a Vineyard
Shen Khar Venakhi sung by a Georgian choir

Demetrius I is said to have written the hymn during his confinement as a monk in the David Gareja Monastery. The hymn is an allegory of Georgia and the patronage of the Virgin Mary; it is also a prayer of praise to Mary in the Georgian Orthodox Church.

As the lyrics do not mention any saints or gods by name, this was the only church-song that was permitted to be performed in the anti-religious Soviet Union. There are East Georgian (Kartli-Kakhetian) and West Georgian (Gurian) versions of this chant with very different musical compositions.

Thou Art a Vineyard is usually sung by a choir without instrumental accompaniment and is a classic example of Georgian choral music. The hymn is representative of the late Medieval traditions of the Georgian Renaissance.

== Text ==
Georgian text

შენ ხარ ვენახი, ახლად აყვავებული,
მორჩი კეთილი, ედემს შინა ნერგული,
(ალვა სუნელი, სამოთხეს ამოსული,)
(ღმერთმან შეგამკო ვერვინა გჯობს ქებული,)
და თავით თვისით მზე ხარ და გაბრწყინვებული.

Transliteration

shen khar venakhi, akhlad aq'vavebuli.
morchi k'etili, edems shina nerguli.
(alva suneli, samotkhes amosuli.)
(ghmertman shegamk'o vervina gjobs kebuli.)
da tavit tvisit mze khar da gabrts'q'invebuli.

English translation

You are a vineyard newly blossomed.
Young, beautiful, growing in Eden,
(A fragrant poplar sapling in Paradise.)
(May God adorn you. No one is more worthy of praise.)
You yourself are the sun, shining brilliantly.

== Popular culture ==
It was performed in a Georgian 1969 film, Don't Grieve.

Its rendition can be heard in 'The Poet in the Prince's Court' segment of the Soviet Armenian film The Color of Pomegranates.

This hymn is used as one of Georgia's musical themes in the video-game expansion, Civilization VI: Rise and Fall.

== See also ==
- Culture of Georgia (country)
- Kingdom of Georgia
