= Nakhchivan =

Nakhchivan (Azerbaijani: Naxçıvan), also transliterated as Nakhichevan (Armenian: Նախիջևան, Russian: Нахичевань) may refer to:

- Nakhchivan Autonomous Republic, an exclave of Azerbaijan
- Nakhichevan Autonomous Soviet Socialist Republic, within the Azerbaijan SSR of the Soviet Union, 1921–1990
- Nakhchivan (city), the capital city of the Nakhchivan Autonomous Republic
- Nakhchivan Eyalet, a possible eyalet of the Ottoman Empire
- Nakhichevan Khanate, 1747–1828 khanate under Iranian suzerainty
- Nakhichevan District, an old name of Babek District, a rayon of the Nakhchivan Autonomous Republic of Azerbaijan
- Nakhchivan field, an offshore oil and gas field in Azerbaijan
- Nakhichevan-on-Don, 1779–1928 Armenian-populated town in Russia
- Nakhichevan, a Russian cargo ship that sank in the Sea of Azov in 2007

== See also ==
- Nakhchivan Automobile Plant, an automobile manufacturer in Azerbaijan
- Nakhichevanik, a village in Khojaly District, Azerbaijan
- Nakhichevan uezd, uezd in Caucasus, Russian Empire
- Nakhjavan Tappeh, a village in West Azerbaijan, Iran
