= Tughril ibn Kilij Arslan II =

Tughril Shah
- Sultan of Erzurum
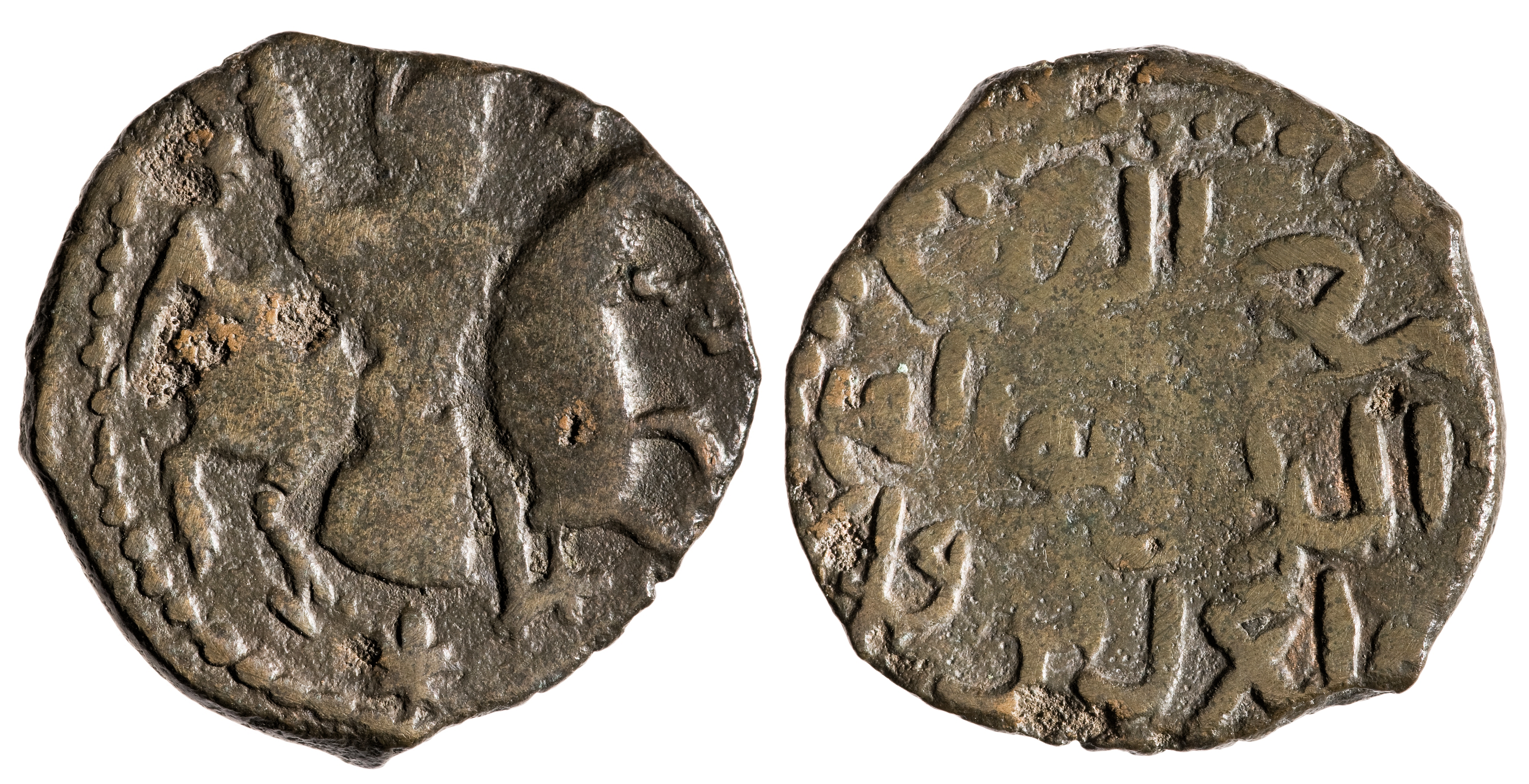
- Coinage of Tughril Shah b. Qilij Arslan, with horserider on the obverse. Erzurum.

Sultan of Rum in Erzurum
- Reign: 1202–1225
- Successor: Jahan Shah
- Co-Sultan: Suleiman II (1202–1204); Kilij Arslan III (1204–1205); Kaykhusraw I (1205–1211); Kaykaus I (1211–1220); Kayqubad I (1220–1225)
- Born: 1169
- Died: 1225 (aged 56)
- Spouse: Malika Khatun (daughter of Fakhr al-Din Bahramshah)
- Issue: Jahan Shah; Ghias ad-Din; Melika Ismat al-dunya wa'l-din (wife of Alaeddin Keykubat I)
- Father: Kilij Arslan II
- Religion: Islam

Tughril Shah, also Abdu'l Harij Muhammad Mughis ad-din Tughril Shah ibn Kilij Arslan II (r.1202–1225) was a Turkoman king of the "Seljuqs of Erzurum", following the fall of the Saltukids in the region, one of the Anatolian beyliks. He was another son of Kilij Arslan II, who in 1186 had partitioned his kingdom in Anatolia between several of his numerous sons. He was succeeded by his son Rukn al-Din Jahanshah bin Tughril.

Before the 1201–1202 conquest of Ezurum by Suleiman II of Rûm, son of Kilij Arslan II, the region of Erzurum had been ruled by a local Turkoman dynasty, the Saltukids from 1071 until 1202. Suleiman II of Rûm had prepared for war to weaken the power of Christian Georgia and to conquer Georgia. Between 1201 and 1203, Suleiman II with detachments under the command of his brother Tughril Shah from his fief of Elbistan, Mengujekid Bahram Shah of Erzincan, and possibly with the help of the Harput Artuqids as well as local Turkmen warriors, captured Erzurum and replaced the vassal of Georgia, Saltuk, with his brother Tughril Shah. The Turkic expansion was stopped with the Battle of Basiani which resulted in a Georgian victory in 1202. Before 1213, he married Malika Khatun, the daughter of the Mengüjek ruler Fakhr al-Din Bahramshah.

During 30 years after this conquest, Erzurum was ruled by the two Seljuq princes Tughril ibn Kılıç Arslan II and Jahan Shah bin Tughril as an appanage. Tughril Shah had received Elbistan in appanage upon the division of the sultanate of Rum by his father Kilij Arslan II in 1192, but was then installed at Erzurum c. 1201. He broke away from the Seljuk state in 1211-12, and appears to have been a tributary to Georgia for at least parts of his reign. His son Rukn al-Din Jahan Shah succeeded him, and allied with the Khwarizmian Shah Jalal al-Din, until he was defeated at the Battle of Yassı Çimen in 1230.

Tughril had another son named Ghias ad-din, who became the husband of Queen Rusudan of Georgia from c. 1223 to 1226. He had converted to Christianity on his father's order so as he could marry the queen of Georgia. The anonymous 14th-century Chronicle of a Hundred Years, part of the Georgian Chronicles, reports that the young Seljuq prince had been held at the Georgian court as a hostage in order to ensure the loyalty of Erzurum. Rusudan liked him and took him as a husband. The contemporary Arab scholar Abd al-Latif al-Baghdadi also confirms that it was Rusudan who opted for the Seljuq prince, but Ali ibn al-Athir states that the emir of Erzurum himself proposed the marriage in order to defend his country from the Georgian encroachments. After the Georgians rejected the emir's request on account of his being a Muslim, he ordered his son to convert to Christianity, the fact that is described by ibn al-Athir as "a strange turn of events without parallel". He had two children, a daughter, Tamar, and a son, David, who would become David VI of Georgia.

The region of Erzurum was incorporated into the Sultanate of Kay Qubadh I in 627/1230.

== Sources ==
- Baumer, Christoph (2023). History of the Caucasus. Bloomsbury. ISBN 9780755636303.
- Bosworth, C.E. (1996). The New Islamic Dynasties: A Chronological and Genealogical Manual. New York: Columbia University Press.
- Djaparidze, Gotcha I. (1995). საქართველო და მახლობელი აღმოსავლეთის ისლამური სამყარო XII-XIII ს-ის პირველ მესამედში [Georgia and the Near Eastern Islamic world in the 12th–13th century] (PDF) (in Georgian). Tbilisi: Metsniereba.
- Peacock, Andrew (2006). "Georgia and the Anatolian Turks in the 12th and 13th centuries". Anatolian Studies. 56: 127–146. doi:10.1017/S0066154600000806. JSTOR 20065551. S2CID 155798755.
- Metreveli, Roin, ed. (2008). "„ასწლოვანი მატიანე"" [Chronicle of A Hundred Years] (PDF). ქართლის ცხოვრება [Kartlis Tskhovreba] (in Georgian). Tbilisi: Artanuji. Archived from the original (PDF) on 2012-04-01.
- Lordkipanidze, Mariam (1994). "Georgia in the 11th-12th centuries". Essays on Georgian history. Tbilisi: Metsniereba. ISBN 978-5-520-01547-5.
- Richards, Donald Sidney, ed. (2010). The Chronicle of Ibn Al-Athir for the Crusading Period from Al-kamil Fi'l-ta'rikh, Part 3: The Years 589-629/1193-1231: the Ayyubids After Saladin and the Mongol Menace. Farnham: Ashgate Publishing. ISBN 978-0754669524.
- Rayfield, Donald (2012). Edge of Empires, a History of Georgia. London: Reaktion Books. ISBN 978-1-78023-070-2.
- Toumanoff, Cyril (1949–1951). "The Fifteenth-Century Bagratids and the Institution of Collegial Sovereignty in Georgia". Traditio. 7: 169–221. doi:10.1017/S0362152900015142. JSTOR 27830207.
