= Mama Hatun =

Female ruler of the Saltukids

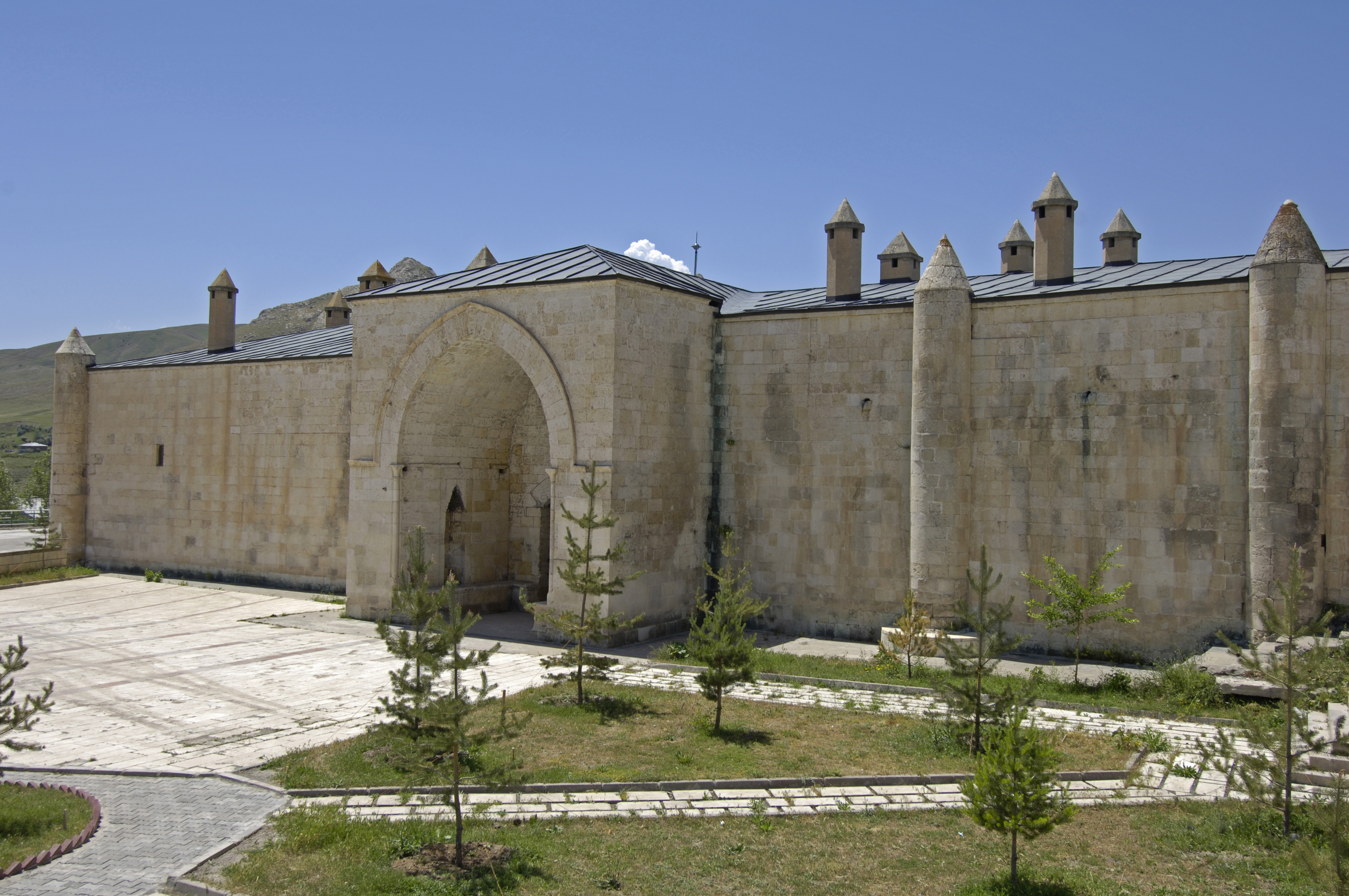
Kervansarai of Mama Hatun, Tercan

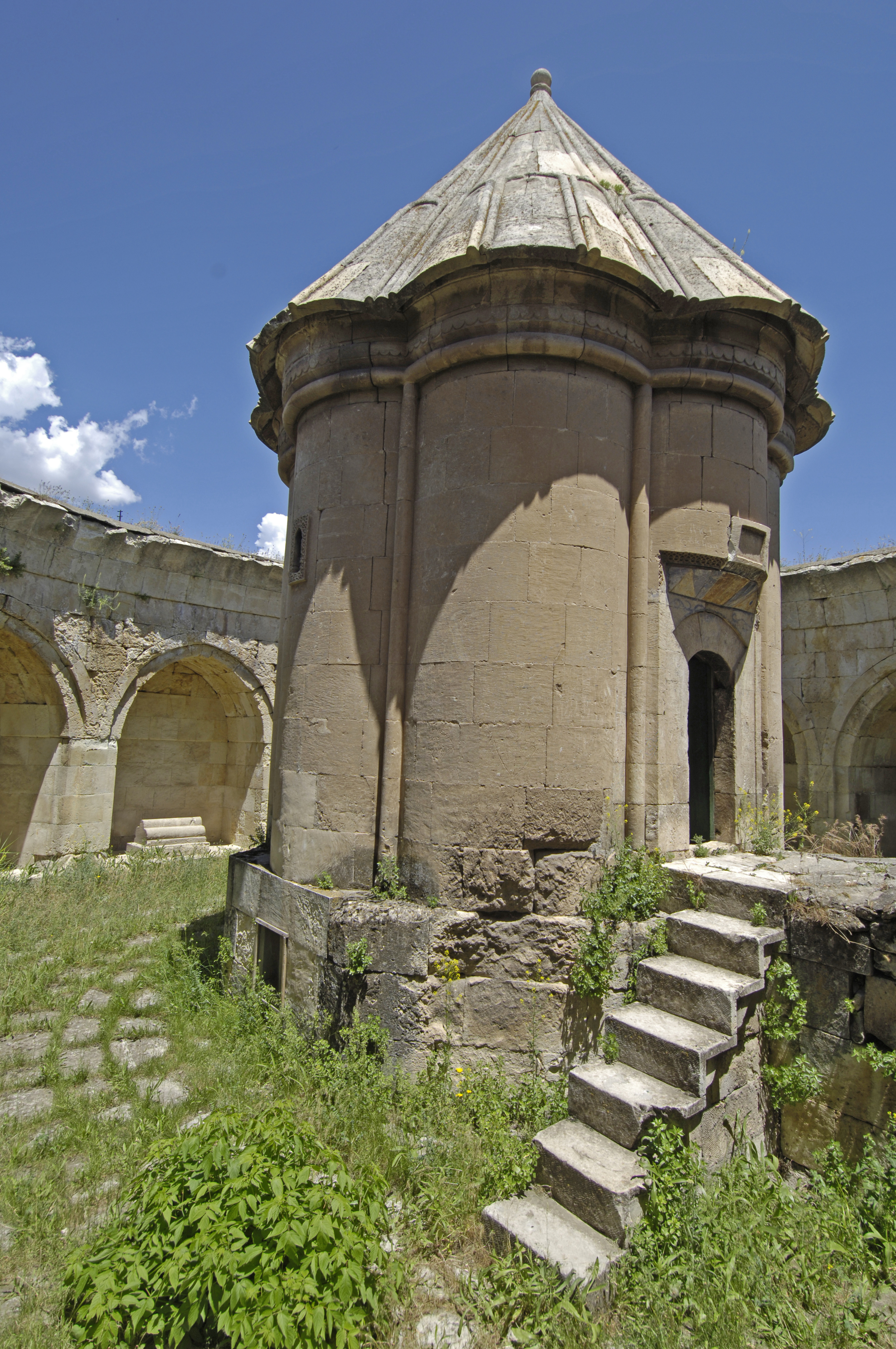
Tomb of Mama Hatun, in Tercan

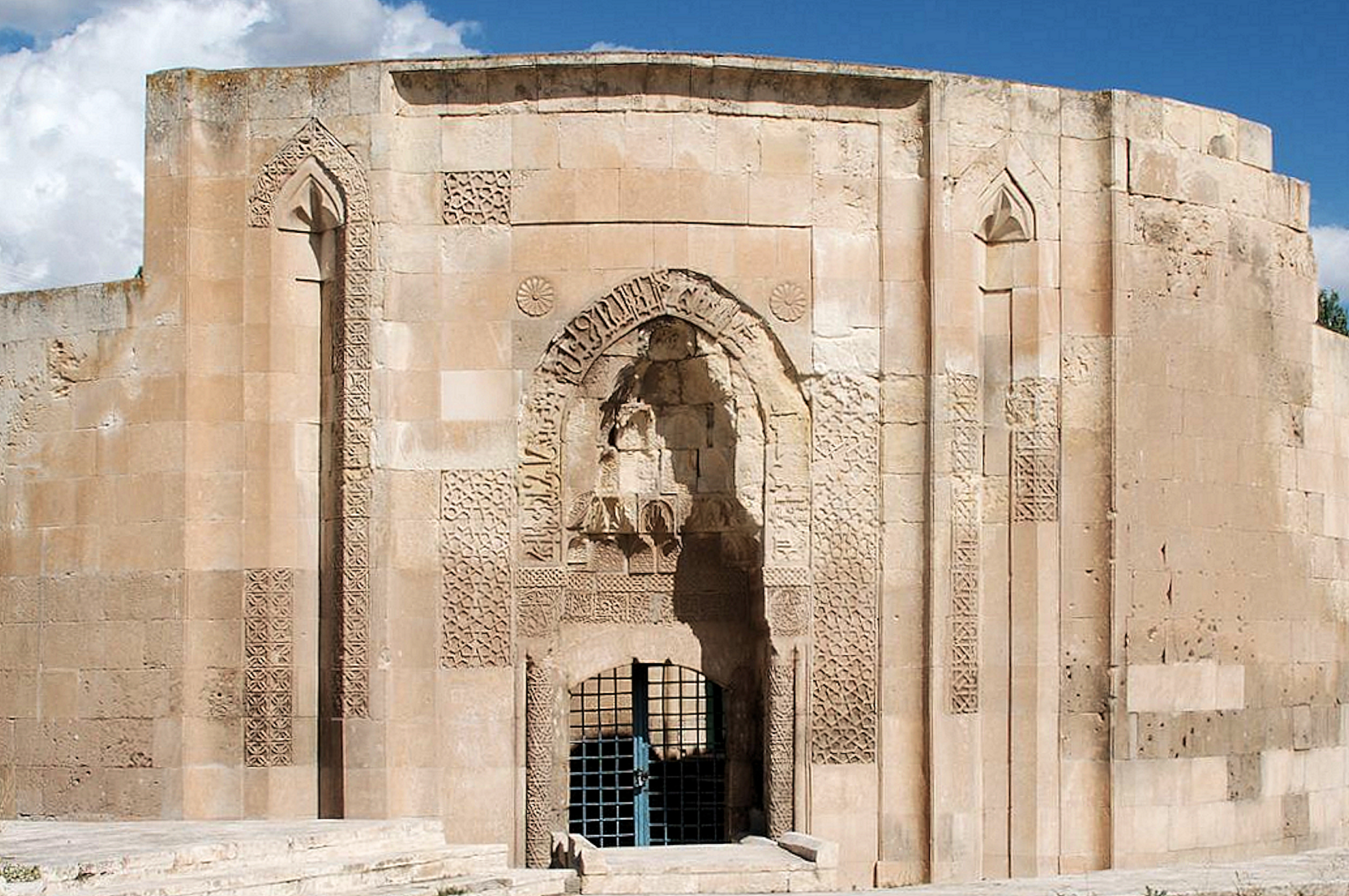
Gate of the enclosure for the tomb of Mama Hatun, with Muqarnas decoration, 1190-1200 CE, Tercan. This design is similar to that of the zhamatun at the Church of the Holy Apostoles in Ani.

Melike Mama Hatun, or simply Mama Hatun or Mamakhatun (fl. 1200), was a female ruler of the Saltukids, with its capital in Erzurum, for an estimated nine years between 1191 and 1200.

== Life ==
Melike Mama Hatun was the daughter of Saltuk II and the sister of Nasiruddin Muhammed. She succeeded her brother on the throne.

During her reign she had a caravanserai, a mosque, a bridge, and a hammam built in the town of Tercan, located midway between Erzincan and Erzurum, which are still standing and are named after her.

In 1200, she wrote to the Ayyubid ruler and asked for a husband from the Mamluk nobility in order to secure support for her position against her nephews. She was dethroned by the Beys and replaced by her son Malik-Shah.

Her tomb, built by masters from Ahlat, is also in Tercan, although the attribution to Mama Hatun is only the result of a strong oral tradition. One of the secondary tombs is dated 1203, which tends to corroborate the general date of the building. An inscription mentions the builder of the structure:

The work of Abu’l Muna bin Mufaddal al-Awhal ... al-Khilati, the builder, may God pardon him, as well as his father and his mother.

The town itself was called Mamahatun until recently, and is still referred to as such locally. During her reign she built mosques, a medrese, several mekteps, shadirvans, caravanserais, and other types of Islamic architecture. She also built many hammams throughout her rule.

Mama Hatun also remains a vivacious figure in Turkish folk literature to this day.

== See also ==
- Anatolian beyliks

== Sources ==
- Sevim, Ali: Türk Tarihi – Fetih, Selçuklu ve Beylikler Dönemi, Türk Tarih Kurumu 1989; p207/208
- Dursun Ali Şeker, art. MAMA HATUN (ö. 597/1201'den sonra) Saltuklu melikesi (1191 - 1200), in İslâm Ansiklopedisine 27 (2003), p. 548.
