= Saltukids =

Turkoman dynasty from 1071 to 1202

- 1071–1202
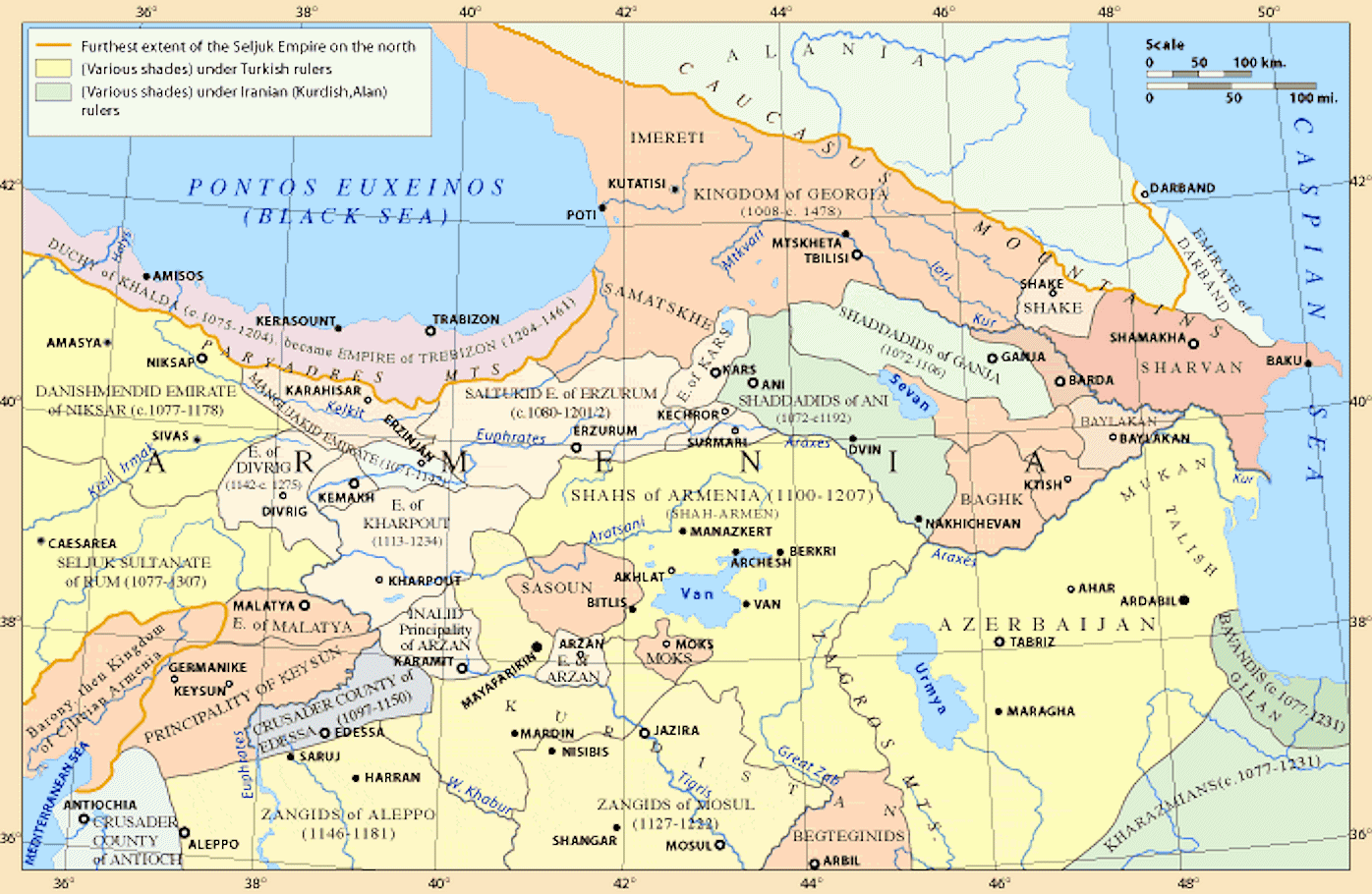
- Map of the Saltukids ( )
- Capital: Erzurum
- Common languages: Armenian, Turkish
- Government: Monarchy
- History
  - Established: 1071
  - Disestablished: 1202

The Saltukids or Saltuqids (Modern Turkish: Saltuklu Beyliği) were a dynasty of the Seljuk Empire, founded after the Battle of Manzikert (1071) centred on Erzurum. The Saltukids ruled between 1071 and 1202. The beylik was founded by Emir Saltuk, one of the Turkmen commanders of the Great Seljuk Alp Arslan. The beylik fought frequently against the Georgian Kingdom for hegemony of the Kars region. The center of the beylik, Erzurum, was briefly re-occupied by the Byzantine Empire between 1077 and 1079, and was besieged by the Georgian King Giorgi III in 1184. It comprised the entirety of present-day Erzurum and Bayburt provinces, lands east of Erzincan, most of Kars, and lands north of Ağrı and Muş provinces during its height.

== Origin ==
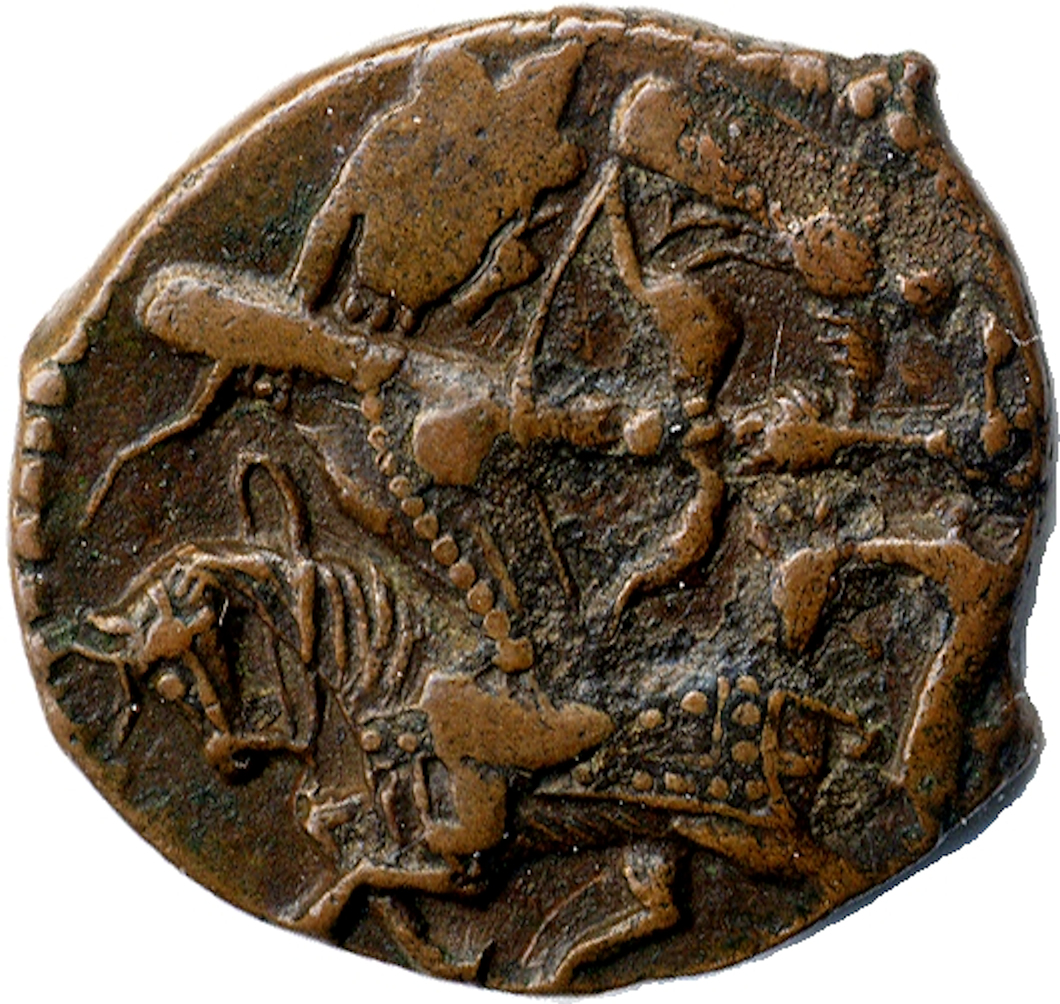
Salduq b. `Ali under the authority of Seljuk Emperor Tughril Beg, Erzurum, 540-70 H (1146-1176 CE)

The first known Saltukid is Ali, who was ruler of Erzurum in 1103. His son and successor was Saltuk, who succeeded him sometime after 1123. Saltuk had a female relative, a daughter or sister, who married Shah-i-Armenid of Akhlat, Sukman II.

In 1132, Ali's son Izz al-Din Saltuk became malik. Izz al-Din was defeated captured in 1154 by Georgians, led by Dimitri I. He would be ransomed by Sökmen of the Artuqids, who later married a daughter of Izz al-Din. In 1161, Izz al-Din along with other Turkish allies besieged the Georgians at Ani, but was defeated. He sent a daughter to marry Kilij Arslan II, but she was captured by the Danishmendid Yağıbasan and married off to his nephew.

The Saltukid dynasty is also notable for having a woman, Melike Mama Hatun, sister of Nasiruddin Muhammed, directly administering its realm for an estimated nine years, between 1191 and 1200. She was later dethroned by the Beys and replaced by her son Malik-Shah once she had started searching for a husband among the Mamluk nobility. Mama Hatun built an impressive caravanserai in the town of Tercan, where her mausoleum also stands. Tercan itself used to be called "Mamahatun", and is sometimes still called as such locally.

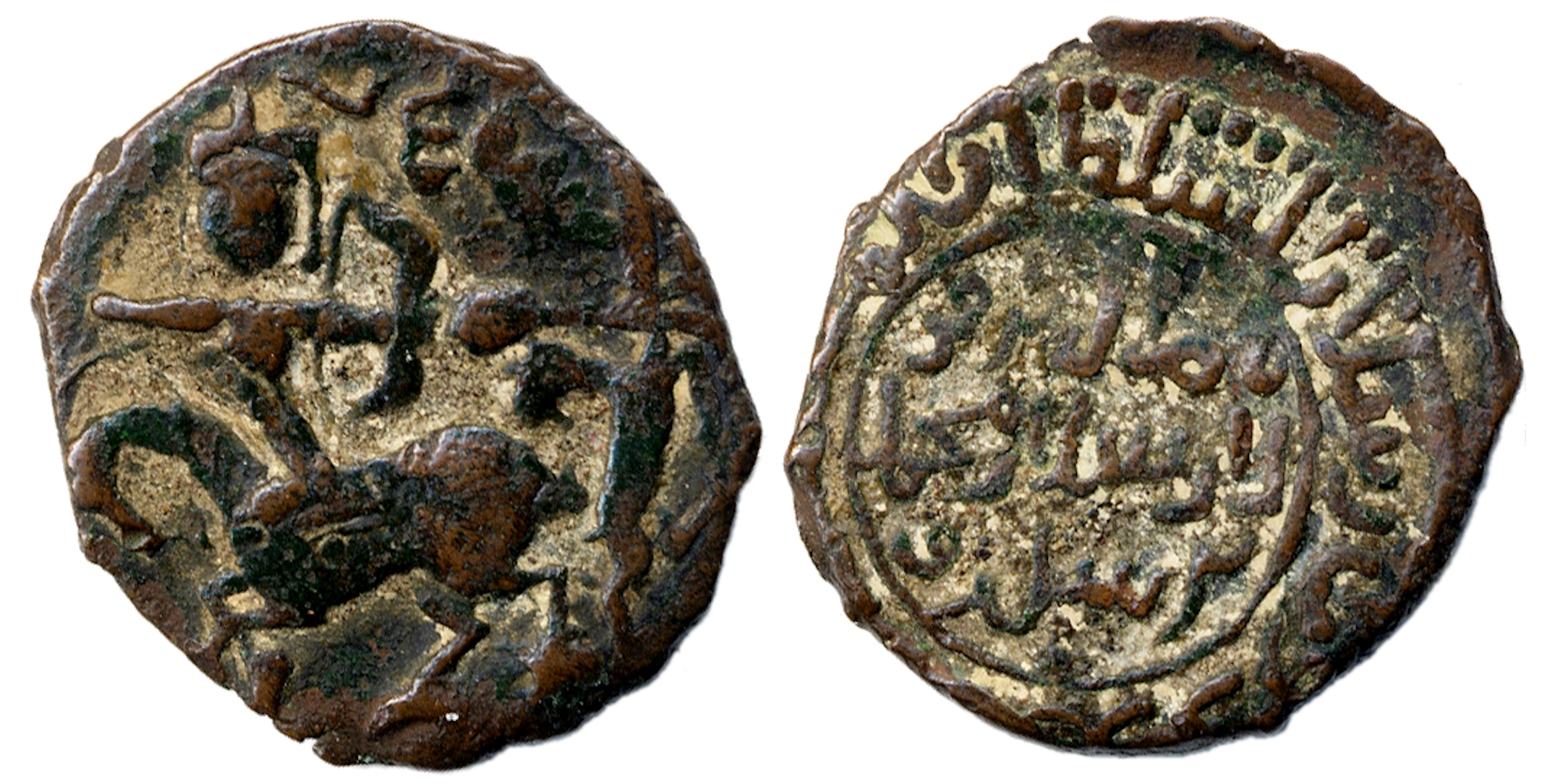
Muhammad b. Salduq under the authority of Tughril Beg, Rukh al-Din Abu Talib, Erzurum, 574 H (1178-1179 CE).

At one point, the son of Muhammad b. Saltuq II offered to convert to Christianity in order to marry the Georgian Queen Tamar.

The name of the ruling dynasty of the beylik should not be confused with that of Sarı Saltuk, a Turkish mystic and saint; who is of later date, more associated with western Anatolia and the Balkans (especially Dobruja), and to whom the epic Saltuknâme is dedicated.

The last ruler of the Saltukids, Alaeddin Muhammed, was dethroned and imprisoned by the Sultan of Rum Süleymanshah II during Süleymanshah's Georgian rout in 1202, and the Saltukid beylik was subsequently annexed by the Sultanate of Rum. During 30 years after this conquest, the region of Erzurum was then ruled by the two Seljuq princes Tughril ibn Kılıç Arslan II and his son Jahan Shah bin Tughril as an appanage, before being incorporated into the Sultanate of Rum under Kay Qubadh I in 627/1230.

== Architecture ==
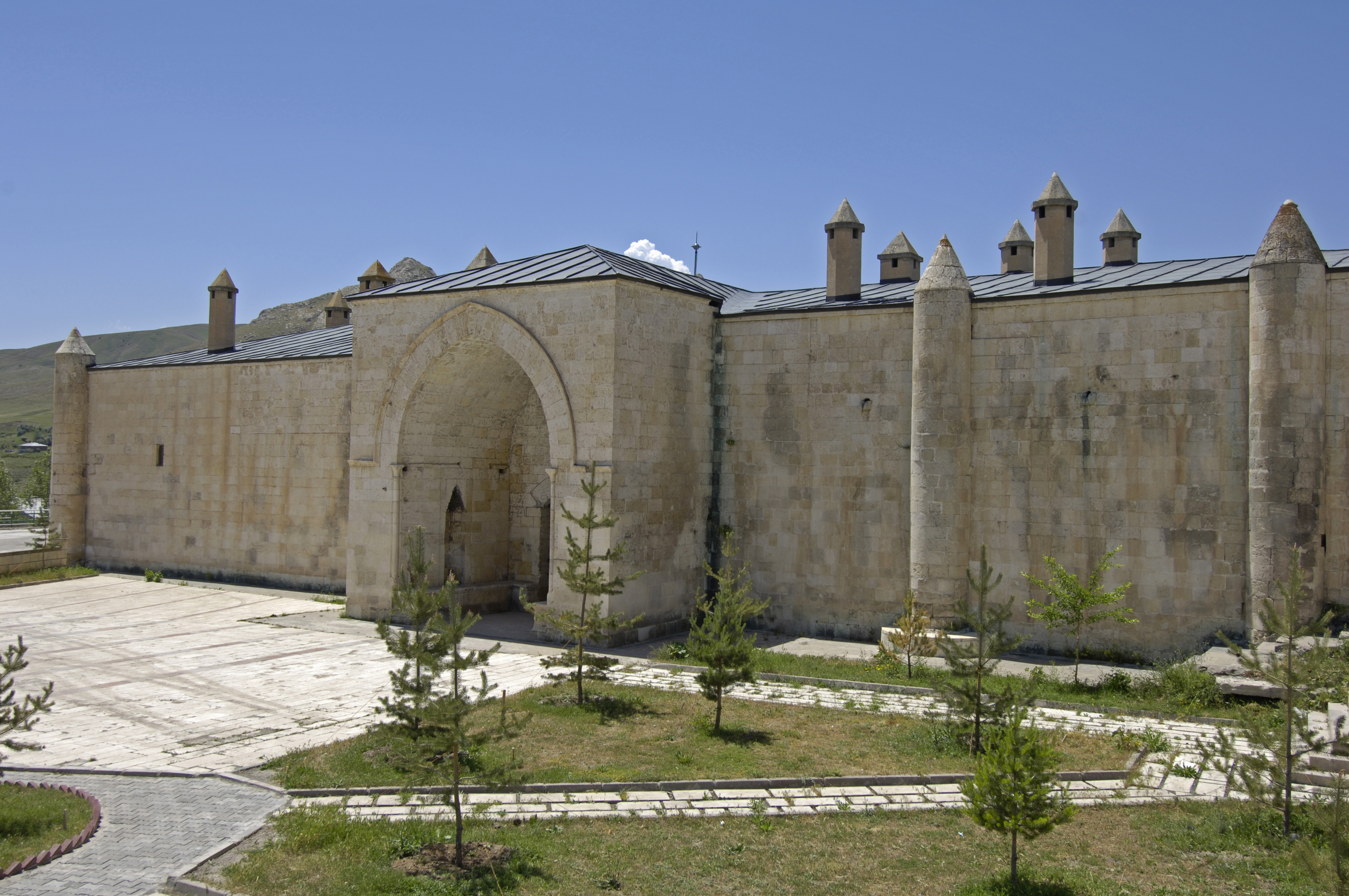
Caravanserai of Mama Hatun, 1190-1200 CE, Tercan

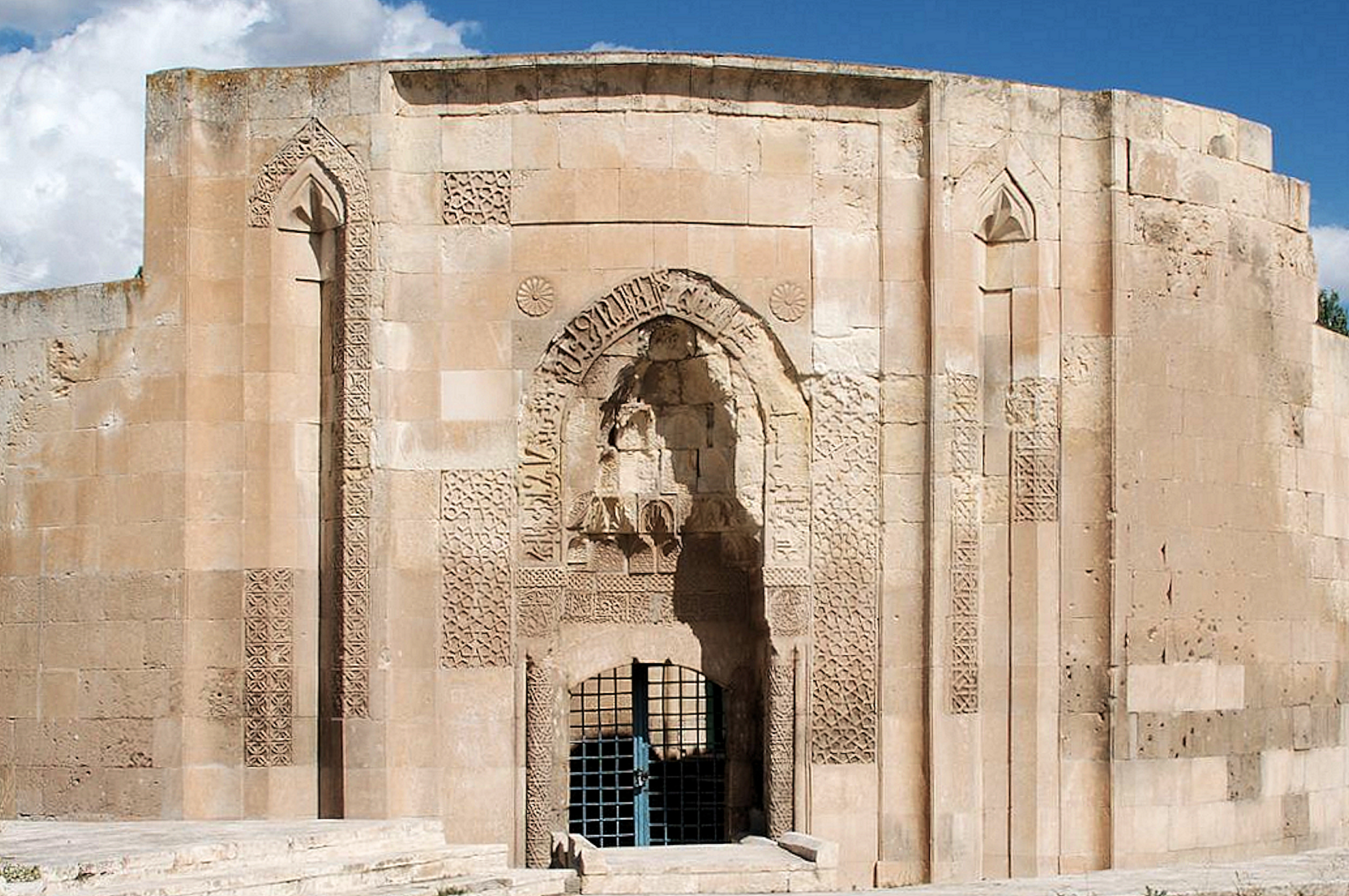
Gate of the enclosure for the tomb of Mama Hatun, with Muqarnas decoration, 1190-1200 CE, Tercan

The beys of Saltuk left important works of architecture such as the Tepsi Minare in Erzurum and the caravanserai in Mama Hatun.

== Rulers ==
- Saltuk I (1071–1102)
- Ali (1102–1124)
- Muzaffer Gazi (1124–1132)
- Izzeddin Saltuk II (1132–1168)
- Nasiruddin Muhammed (1168–1191)
- Melike Mama Hatun (1191–1200)
- Alaeddin Muhammed (1200–1202)

== Genealogy of House of Saltuq ==
House of Saltuq

Saltuqid Beylik

Saltuq I r. 1071–1102
Ali r. 1102–1123	Ghazi r. 1123–1131
Saltuq II r. 1131–1168
Muhammad I r. 1168–1191	Mama r. 1191–1200
Muhammad II r. 1200–1202
