= Jahan Shah bin Tughril =

- Sultan of Erzurum
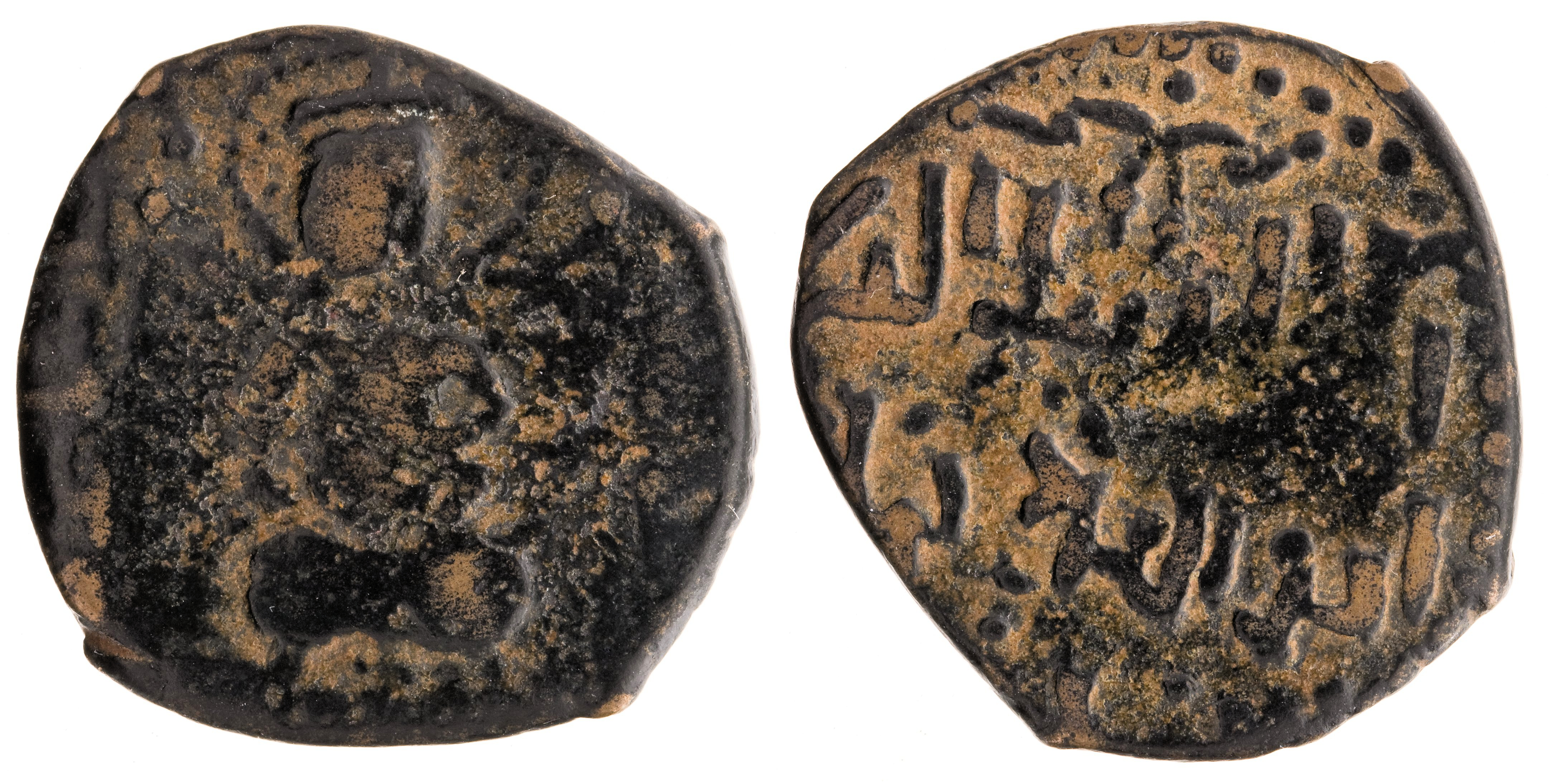
- Jahanshah b. Tughril, Arzarum, 626 H (1228-1229 CE). Obverse: enthroned figure. Reverse: ركن الدنيا والدين, Rukn al-Dunya wa al-Din ابو الفتح جهانشاه, abu al-Fath Jahanshah بن طغرل بك, bin Tughril Beg

Governor of Erzurum
- Reign: 1225–1230
- Predecessor: Tughril Shah
- Successor: Conquest of Erzurum (1230), no governor.
- Co-Sultan: Kayqubad I (1225–1230)
- Born: 1201; Erzurum
- Died: 1230; Erzurum
- Father: Tughril ibn Kılıç Arslan II
- Religion: Islam

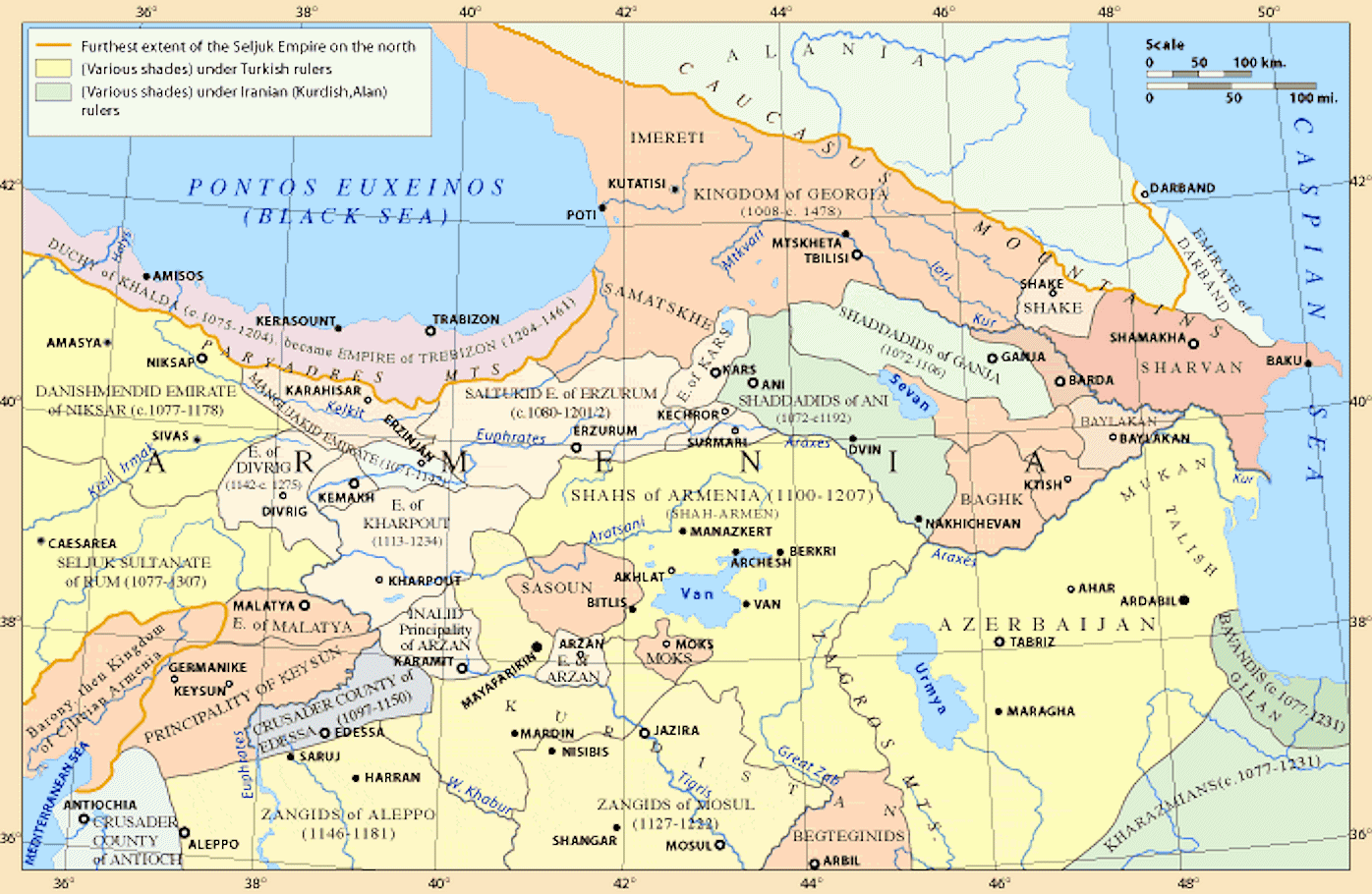
Region of Erzurum ( )

Rukn al-Din Jahanshah bin Tughril (r. 1225–1230) was a Turkoman king of the "Seljuqs of Erzurum". He was a son of Tughril ibn Kılıç Arslan II, also ruler of Erzurum (r. 1202–1225). Jahanshah was a grandson of Kilij Arslan II, who had partitioned his kingdom in Anatolia between his numerous sons.

Before the 1201–1202 conquest of Erzurum by Suleiman II of Rûm, son of Kilij Arslan II, the region of Erzurum had been ruled by a local Turkoman dynasty, the Saltukids from 1071 until 1202. During the 30 years after this conquest, Erzurum was ruled by the two Seljuq princes Tughril ibn Kılıç Arslan II and Jahan Shah bin Tughril as an appanage.

Jahanshah bin Tughril participated to the Siege of Ahlat.

He also allied with the Khwarizmian Shah Jalal al-Din, until he was defeated at the Battle of Yassı Çimen in 1230.

The region of Erzurum was incorporated into the Sultanate of Kay Qubadh I in 1230.

== Sources ==
- Bosworth, C.E. (1996). The New Islamic Dynasties: A Chronological and Genealogical Manual. New York: Columbia University Press.
