= Tercan =

Municipality in Erzincan Province, Turkey

- Municipality
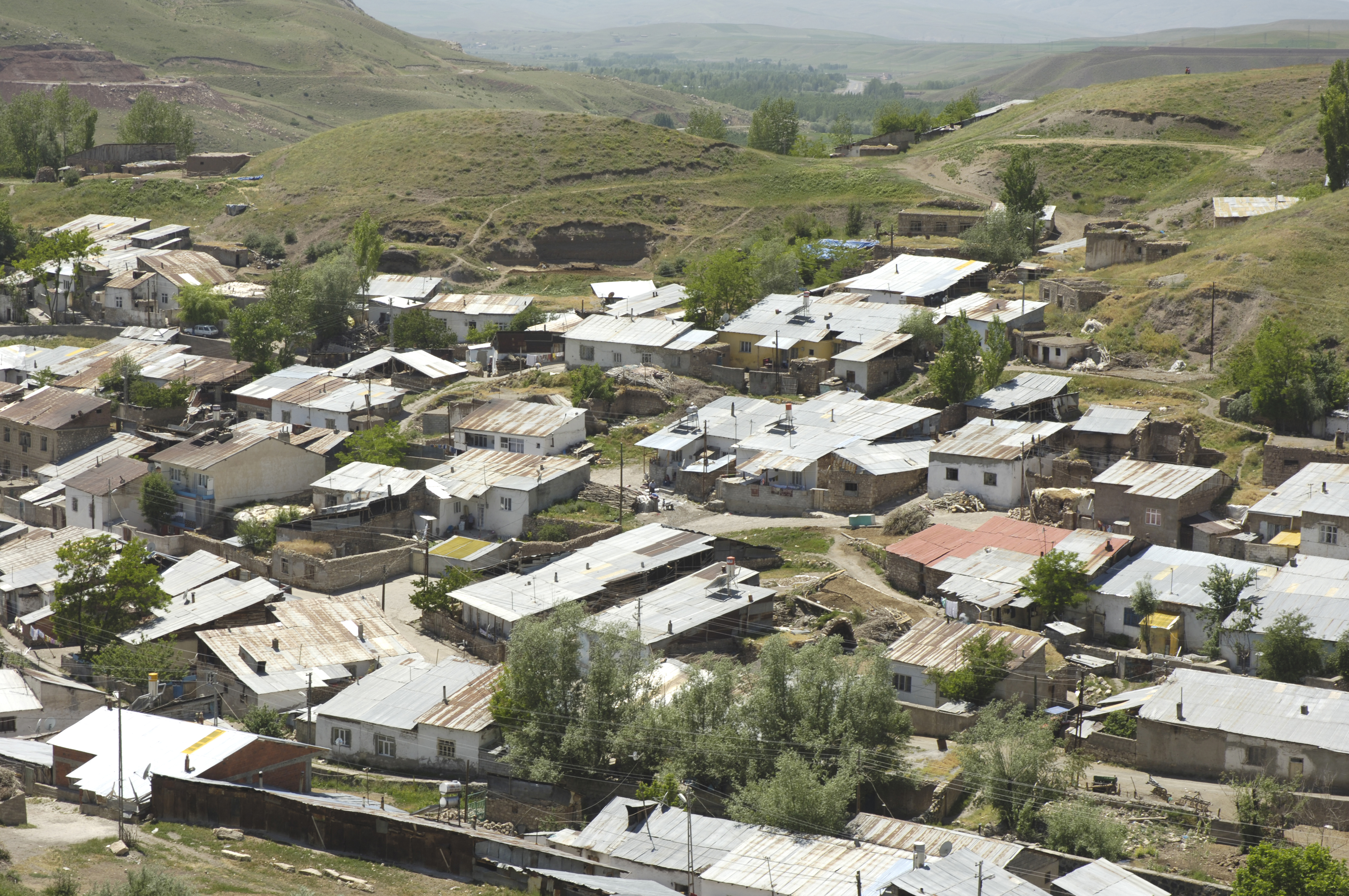

- Location within Turkey
- Coordinates: 39°46′46″N 40°23′03″E
- Country: Turkey
- Province: Erzincan
- District: Tercan
- Population (2021): 4,846
- Time zone: UTC+3 (TRT)
- Website: www.tercan.bel.tr

Tercan (formerly Mama Hatun, and Derzene; Armenian: Դերջան, Greek: Δερζηνή in the Byzantine era; Kurdish: Têrcan; Zazaki: Mamaxatune) is a town and seat of Tercan District of Erzincan Province in the Eastern Anatolia region of Turkey. It had a population of 4,846 in 2021.

Located on the north bank of the Tuzla Su, a tributary of the Euphrates, Tercan is especially notable for the 12th century complex of buildings built by the Saltukid female ruler Melike Mama Hatun, which comprises her tomb, a mosque, a hammam and an impressive caravanserai which was heavily restored in recent years.

== Neighborhoods ==
The town is divided into the neighborhoods of Ahmet Yesevi, Atatürk, Fatih, Kazımkarabekir, Mamahatun and Yavuz Selim.

== History ==
Originally, the main town in the region of Derzene was Pekeriç. Tercan superseded it in perhaps the early Ottoman period. In the middle ages and early Ottoman period, two routes converged at Tercan. The first was the one connecting Erzurum with Erzincan and Sivas. The second was coming from the upper Kelkit basin via the Pekeriç plain.

The 17th century Ottoman traveller Evliya Çelebi visited the place in 1647, calling it Mamahatun. He wrote about the Saltukid complex and described the town as "a Muslim village containing two hundred houses".

== Climate ==
Climate data for Tercan (1991-2020)
Month	Jan	Feb	Mar	Apr	May	Jun	Jul	Aug	Sep	Oct	Nov	Dec	Year
Mean daily maximum °C (°F)	−0.6 (30.9)	1.2 (34.2)	7.6 (45.7)	14.7 (58.5)	20.3 (68.5)	25.9 (78.6)	30.6 (87.1)	31.3 (88.3)	26.2 (79.2)	19 (66)	10 (50)	2.4 (36.3)	15.7 (60.3)
Daily mean °C (°F)	−5.7 (21.7)	−4.3 (24.3)	1.9 (35.4)	8.5 (47.3)	13.4 (56.1)	17.9 (64.2)	21.9 (71.4)	22.3 (72.1)	17.4 (63.3)	11.2 (52.2)	3.6 (38.5)	−2.6 (27.3)	8.8 (47.8)
Mean daily minimum °C (°F)	−10.1 (13.8)	−8.9 (16.0)	−3.1 (26.4)	2.8 (37.0)	7 (45)	10 (50)	13.4 (56.1)	13.6 (56.5)	9.1 (48.4)	4.7 (40.5)	−1.6 (29.1)	−6.6 (20.1)	2.5 (36.6)
Average precipitation mm (inches)	28.93 (1.14)	33.66 (1.33)	47.95 (1.89)	66.88 (2.63)	64.88 (2.55)	31.68 (1.25)	14.11 (0.56)	6.78 (0.27)	18.59 (0.73)	44.96 (1.77)	33.96 (1.34)	28.06 (1.10)	420.44 (16.56)
Average precipitation days (≥ 1 mm)	5.3	5.9	7.2	10.2	9.6	5.4	3	1.8	3.3	5.4	5.1	5.3	67.5
Average relative humidity (%)	75.6	74.2	67.6	62.9	61.2	55.5	49.2	47.7	50.8	62.2	69.9	76	62.7
Mean monthly sunshine hours	100	122.8	163.1	188.9	249.7	305.1	346.6	323.6	278.6	206.9	145.2	92.1	2,522.6
Source: NOAA NCEI

== Monuments ==
=== Caravanserai ===
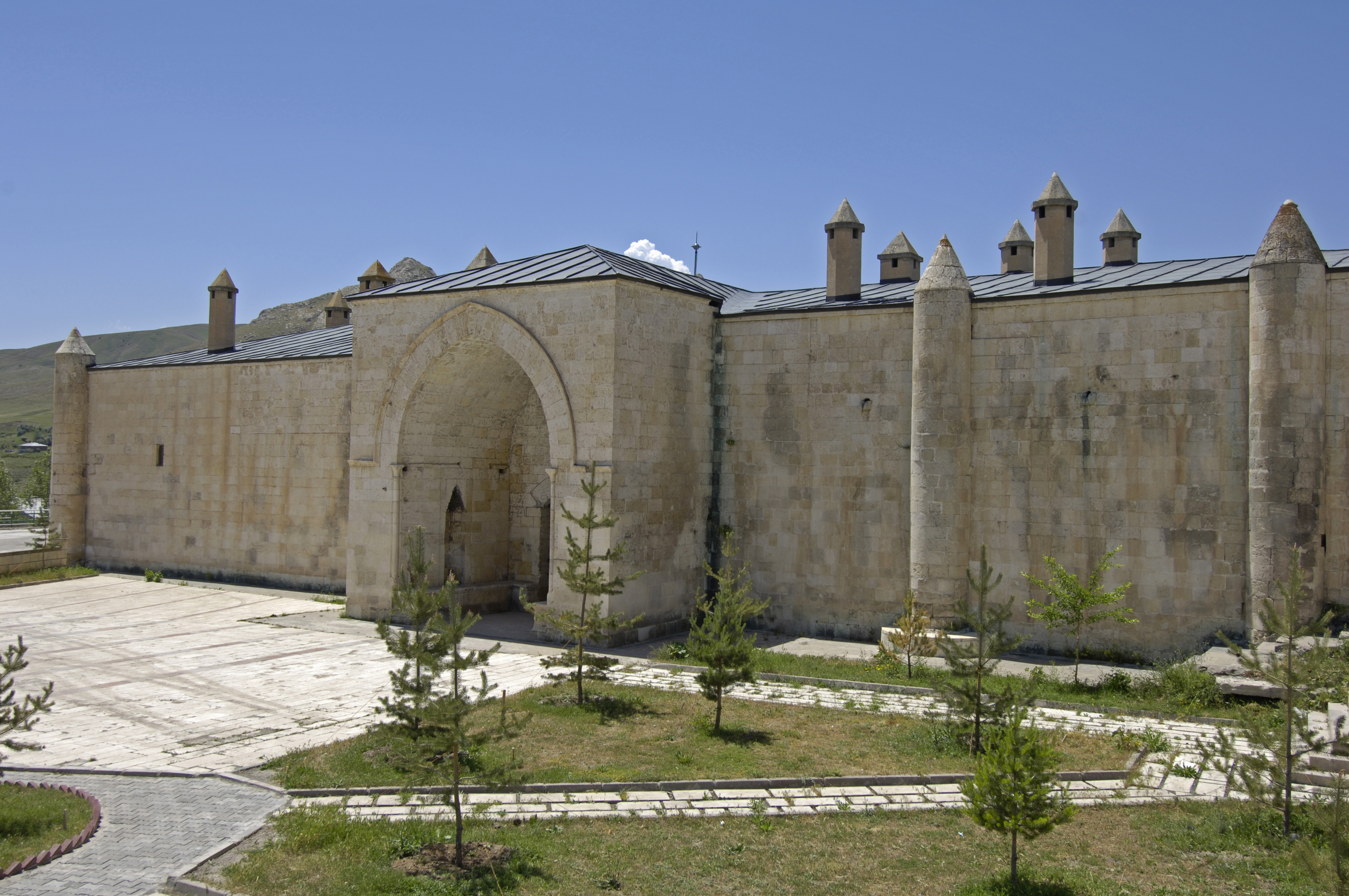
East facade of the caravanserai, showing the monumental entrance portal.

Located just east of the town center, the caravanserai is a roughly square building arranged around a central courtyard. There two rows of five separate rooms on the courtyard's north and south sides - these were used by better-off travelers. These are bordered by two long rooms that take up the entire north and south sides of the building; these served as stables and sleeping quarters for most guests. The monumental entrance is located on the building's east side. Each side of the entryway is flanked by a vaulted recess with a raised floor; this was where guards were posted. Inside the portal is an entrance hall leading to the courtyard. On either side of the hall there are several rooms that were used to store merchandise. A staircase leading up to the roof is on the right side.

At the west end of the building are three tall iwans, which are awkwardly out of place in the building's design - the builders may have copied them wholesale from another building, such as a medrese. The iwans were used as places to sleep in the summer and possibly also as stables. Two large rooms border the iwans, one on the north and one on the south; like the rooms by the entrance hall, these were used to store merchandise.

The caravanserai was changed significantly during the early Ottoman period. The original design had included two porticos on the north and south sides of the courtyard, in front of the first-class rooms; these no longer exist. There had also originally been six first-class rooms on each side; the two at the west end were later converted into iwans.

=== Türbe ===
The türbe is located in the middle of a circular courtyard surrounded by a thick wall. A walkway goes around the top of the outer wall, behind a small parapet. The entrance portal, which is on the southwest side, is richly decorated and is framed by a muqarnas. The wall is raised around the portal, and the upper walkway would have originally gone through a tunnel at this point. On the inside of the wall, beneath the walkway, are a series of wide arched niches. These were originally designed to accommodate tombs for family members. The wall above them overhangs slightly and probably represent the remains of a vaulted portico. One of these niches has since been replaced with a fountain. The türbe's main tower is a relatively simple structure without windows. Inside, a staircase leads down to the burial chamber, which is partly below ground.

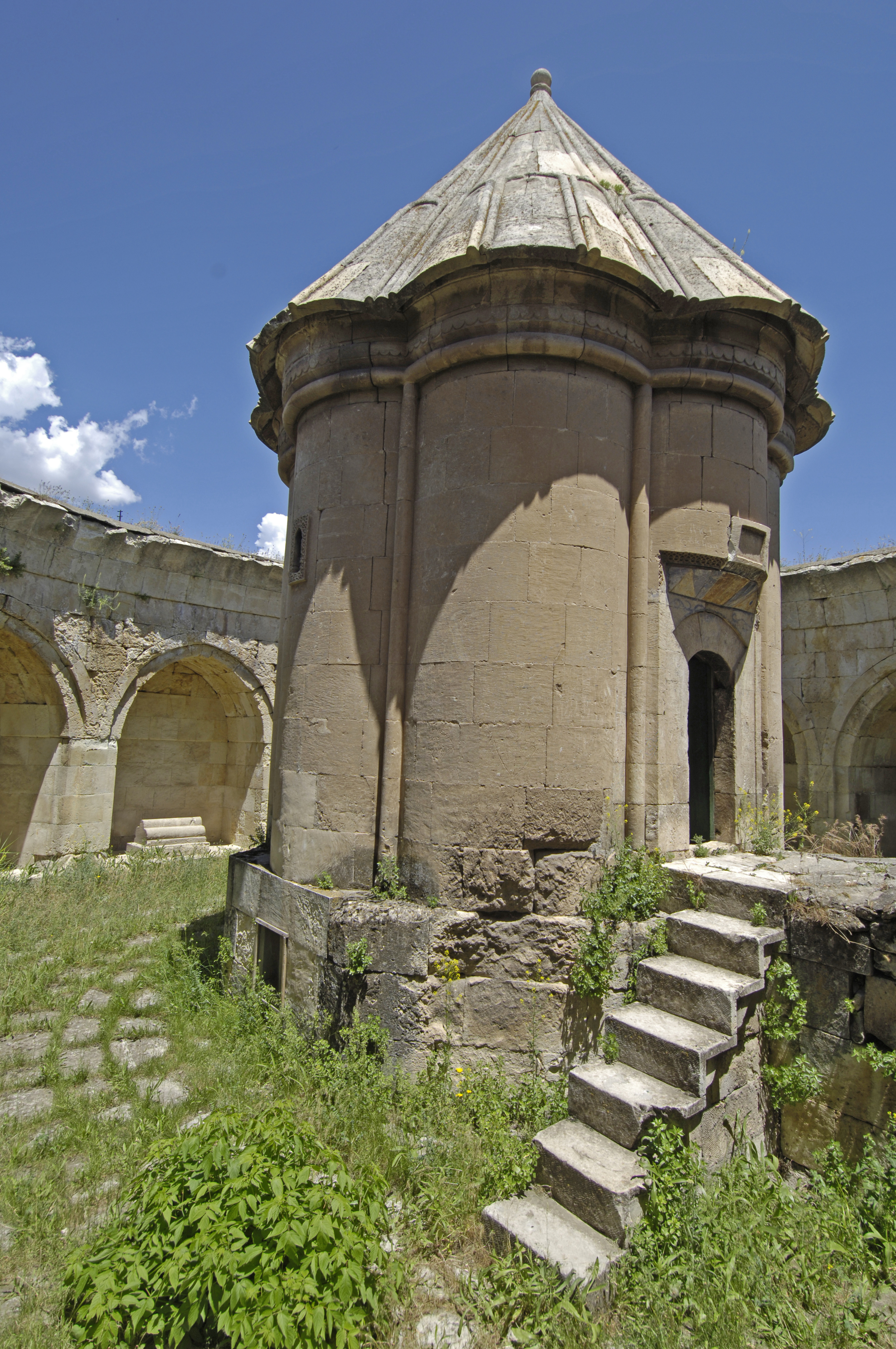
Tomb of Melike Mama Hatun.

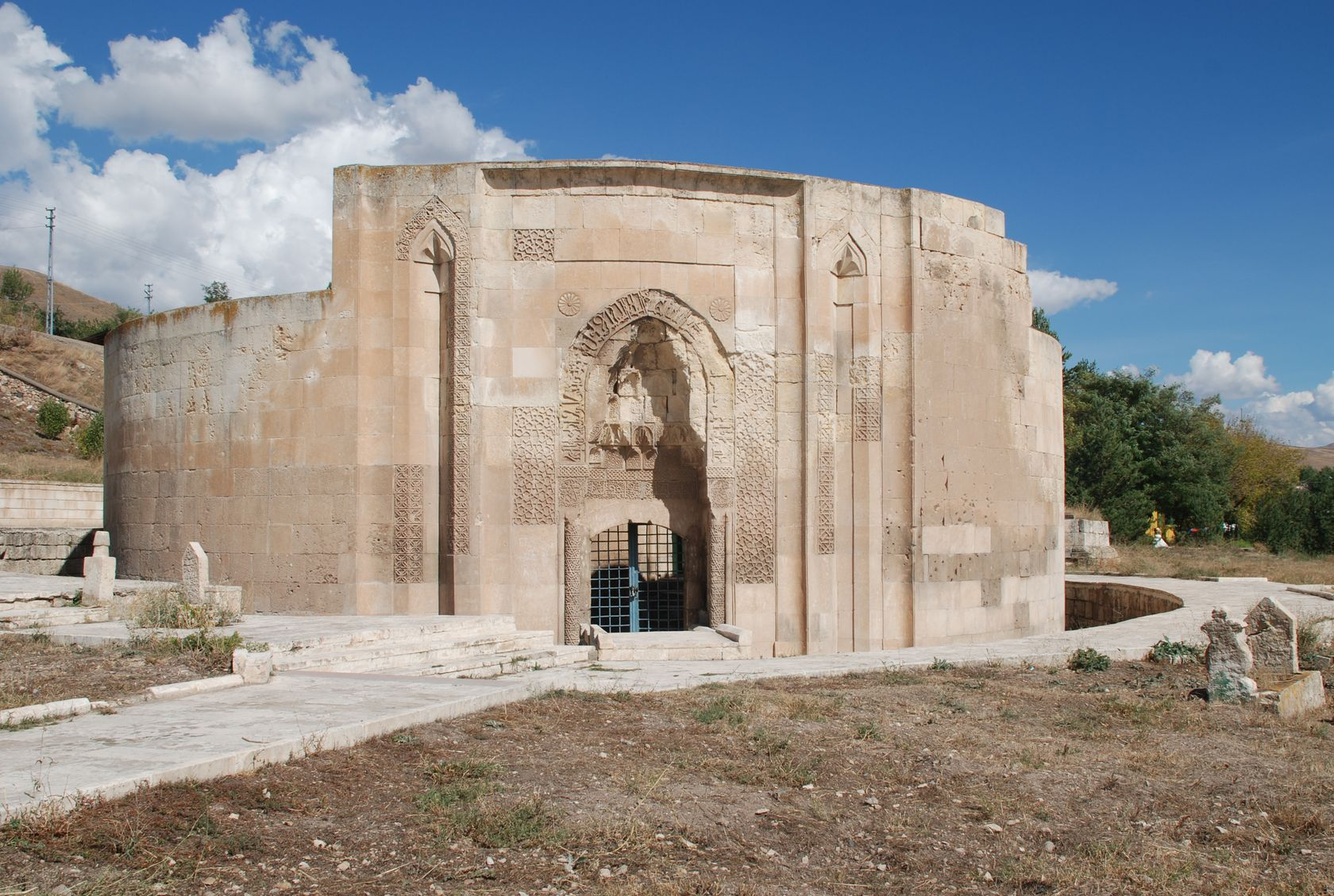
Entrance portal to the tomb complex.

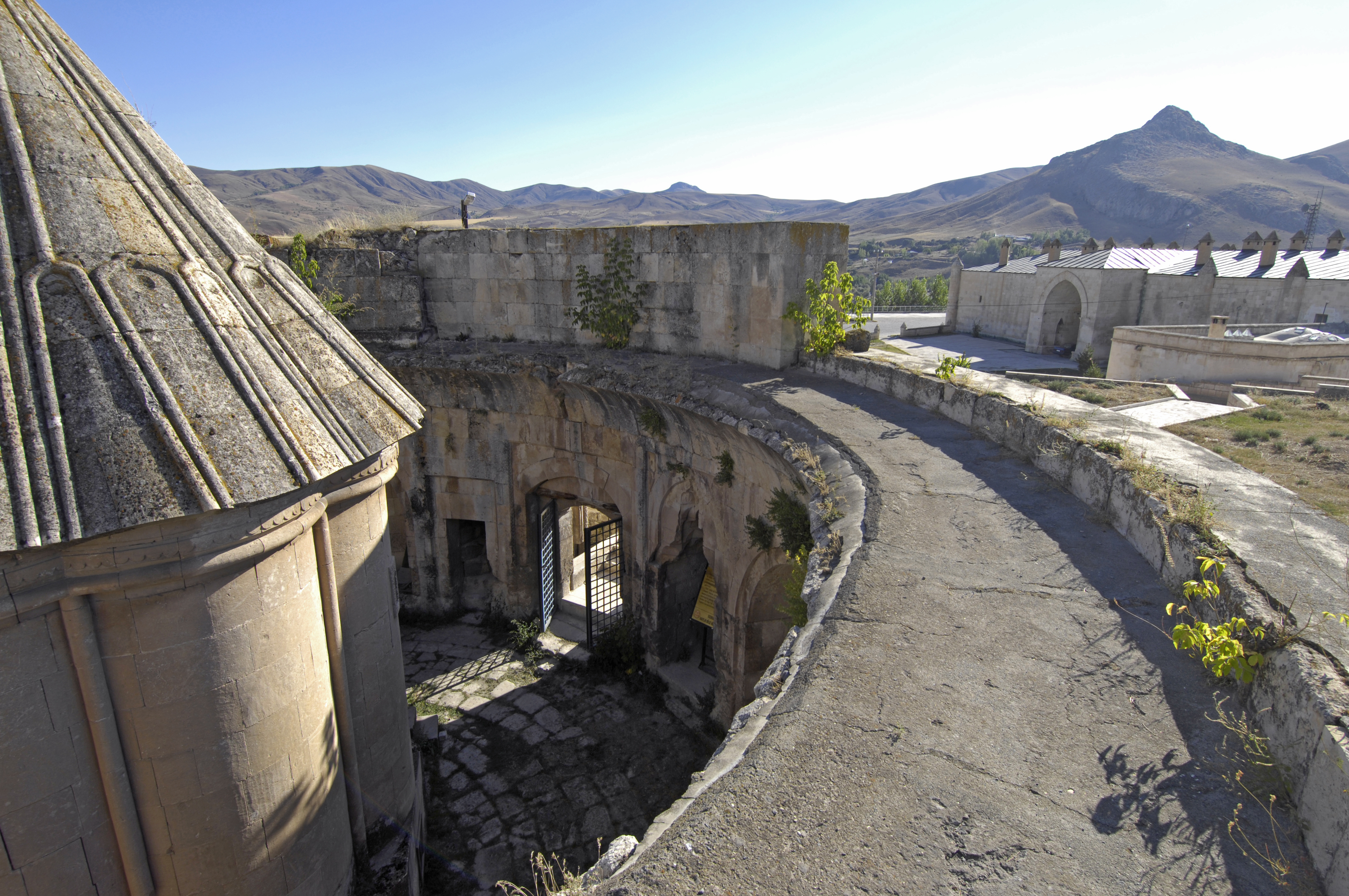
Interior view of the walkway on top of the outer wall.

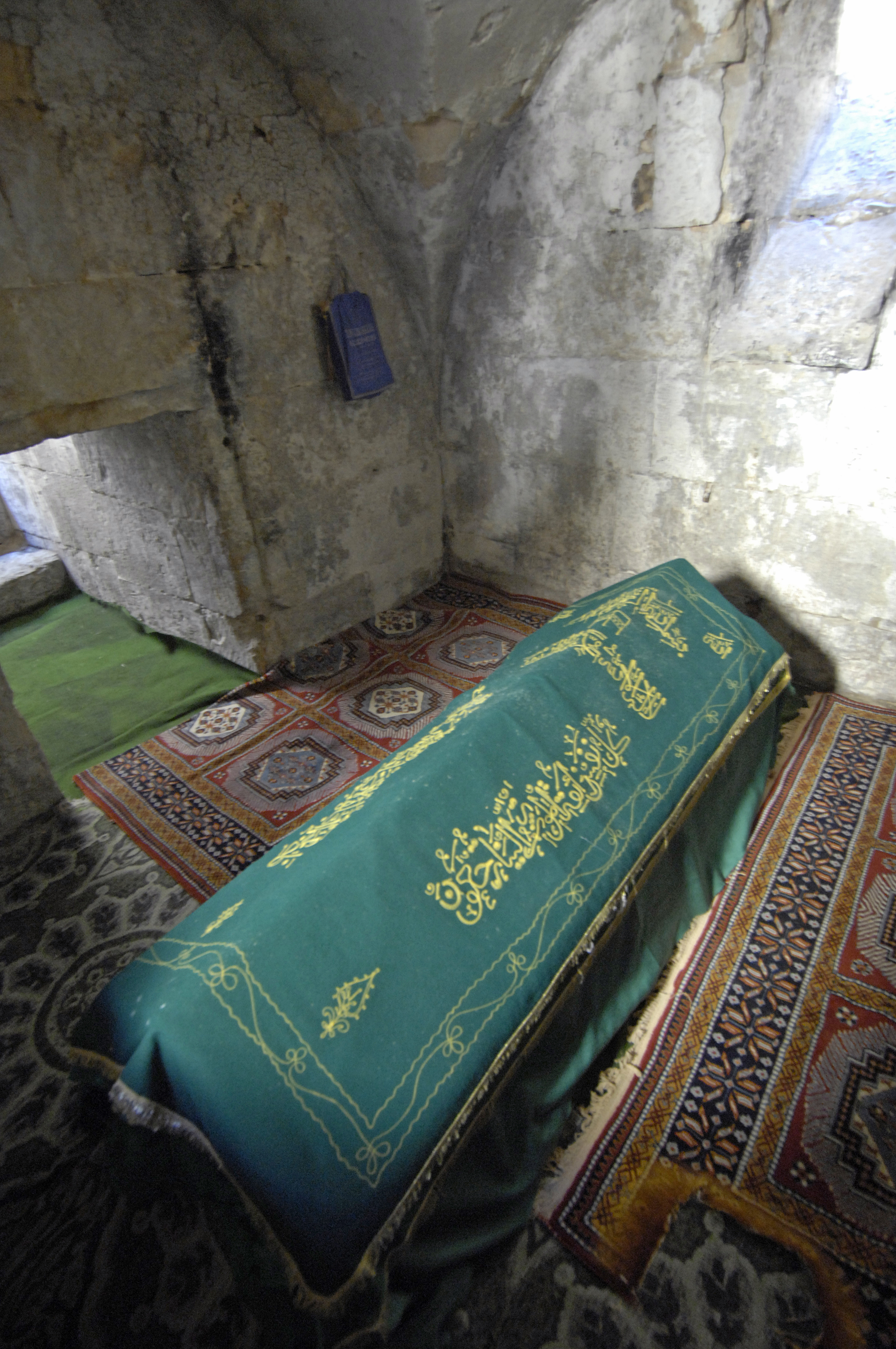
Interior of the tomb

== Other nearby sights ==
- Kötür bridge
- Pekeriç fortress
- Abrenk (Vank) church
- Kefrenci temple

== Gallery ==
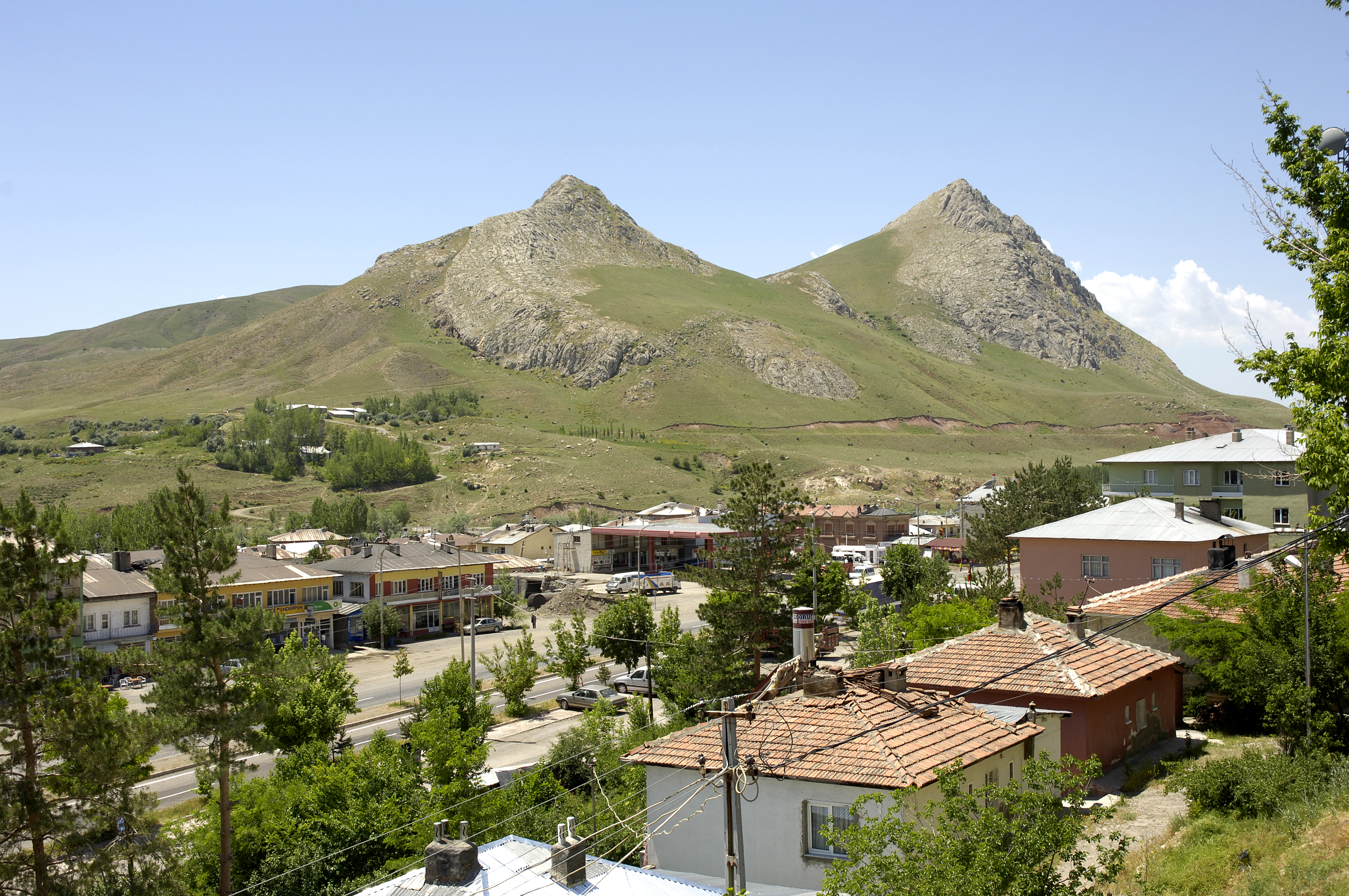
The main road running through Tercan

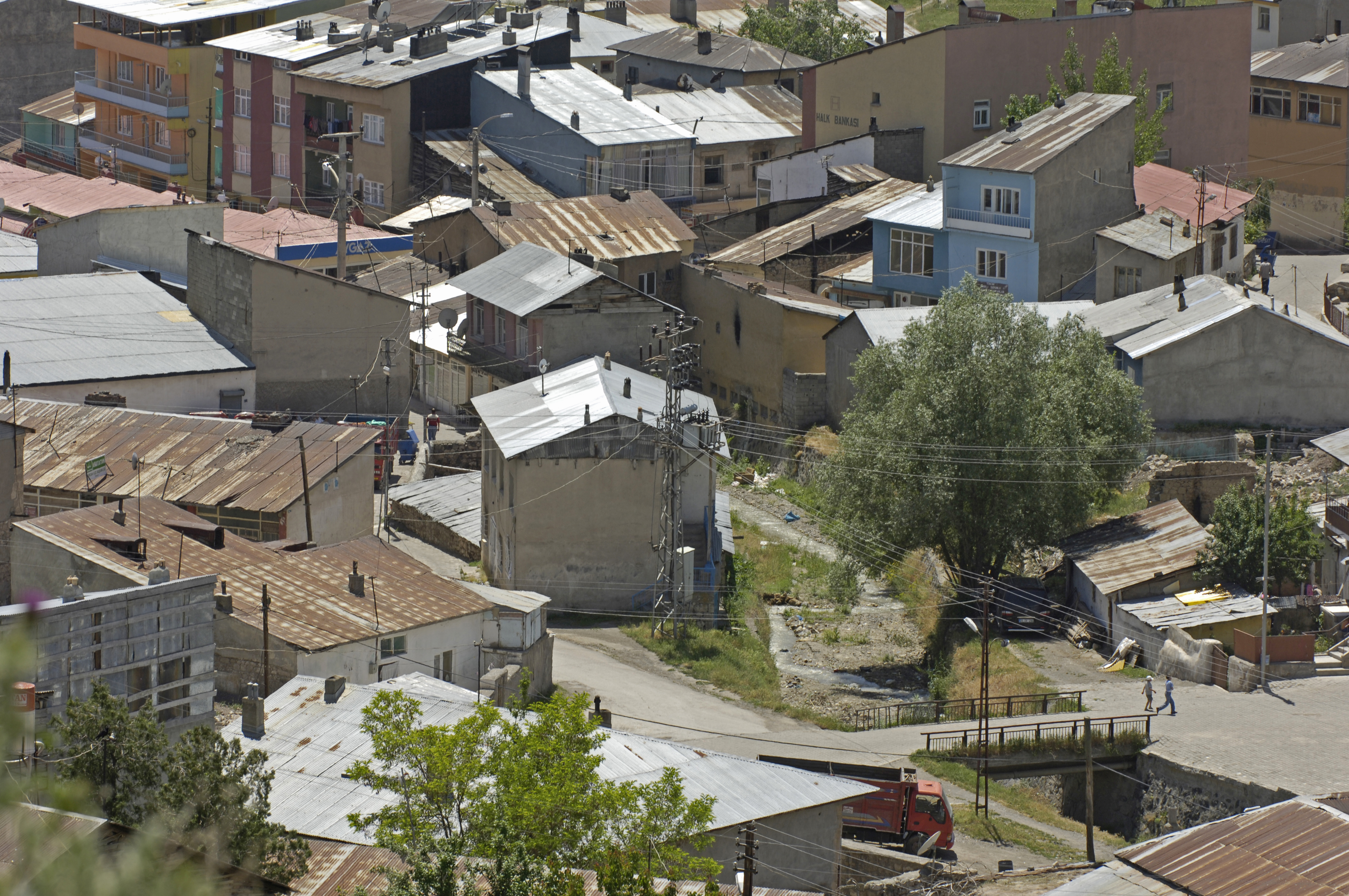
View of Tercan

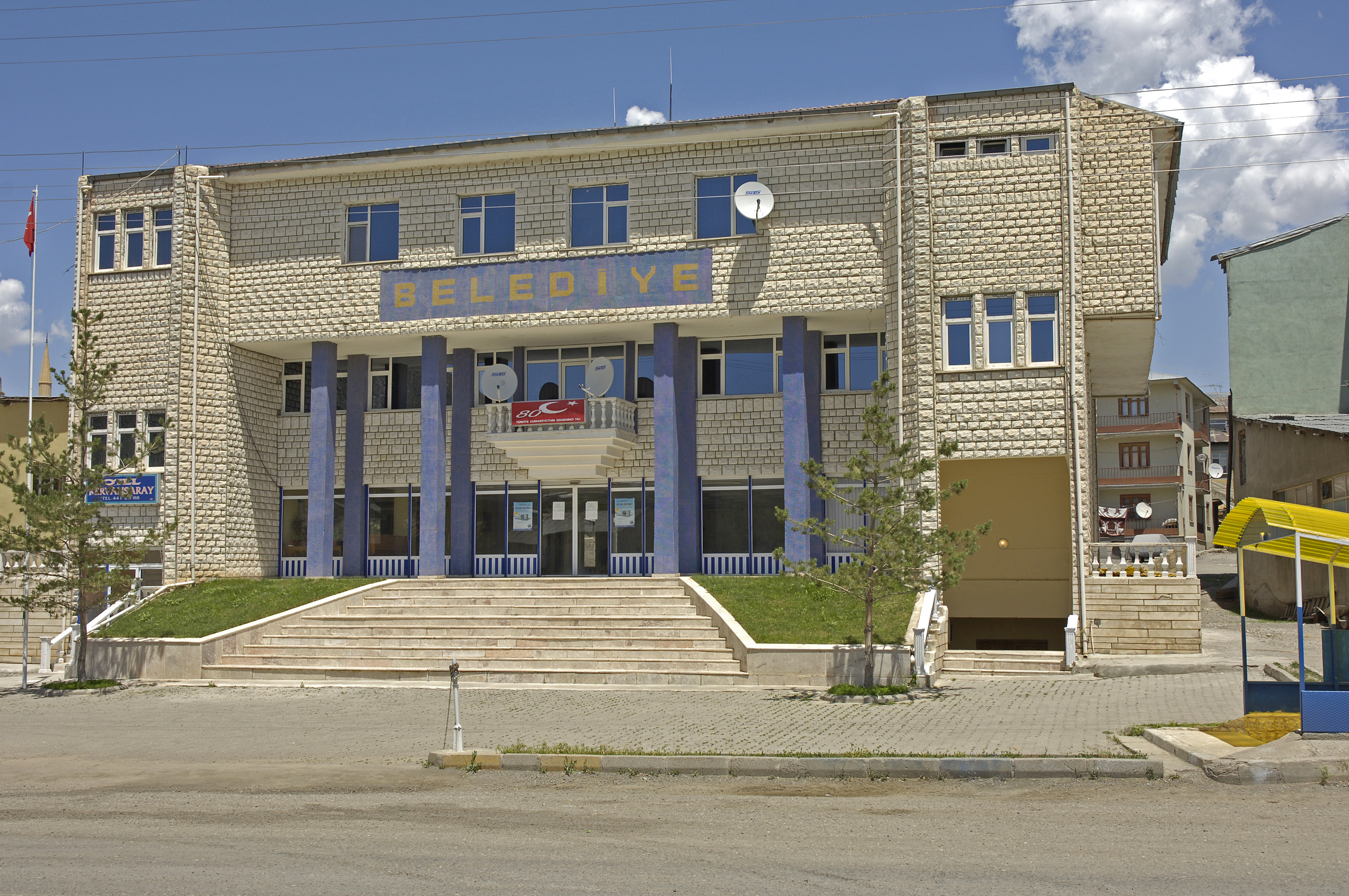
Town hall building

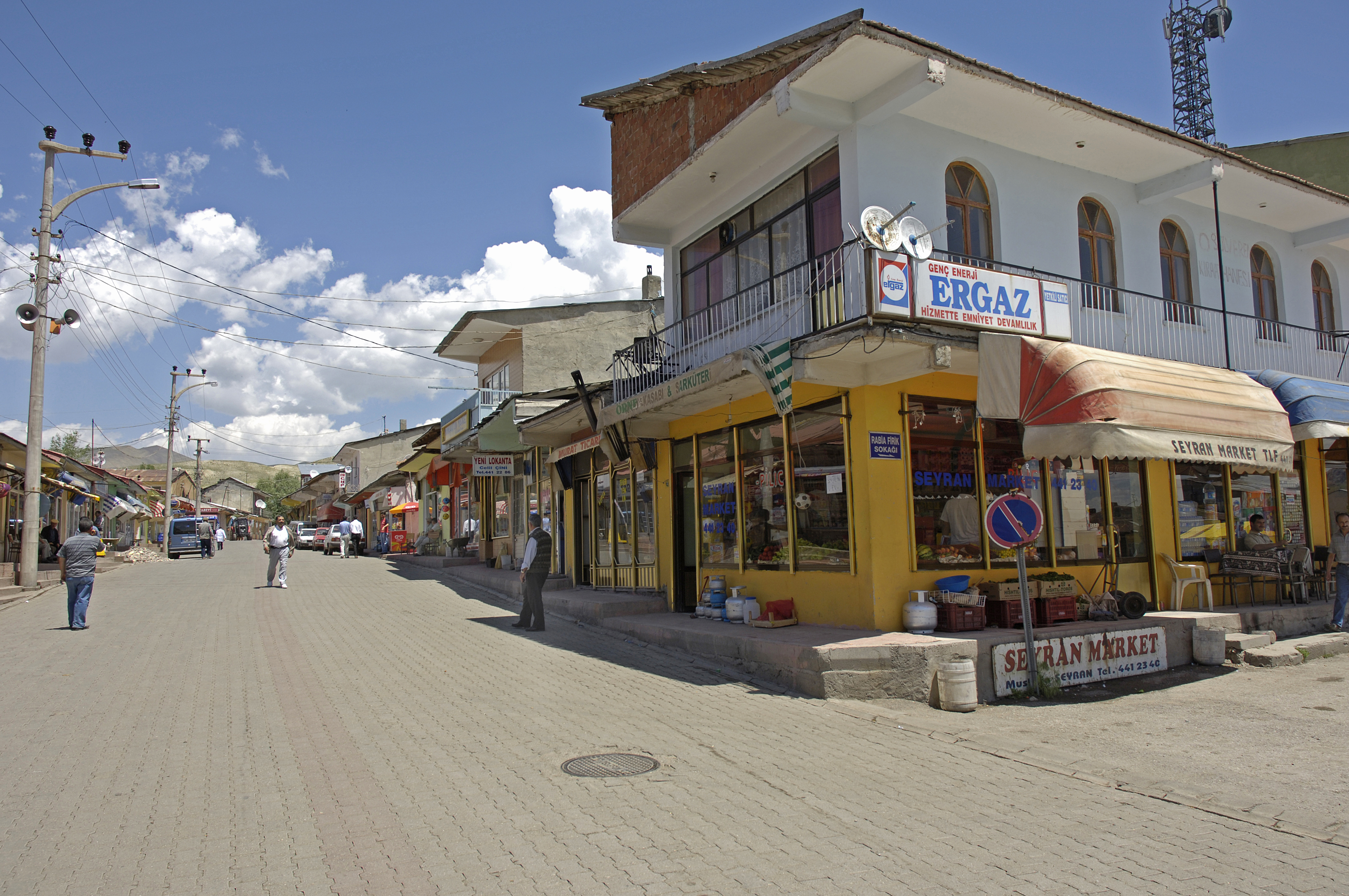
Street scene

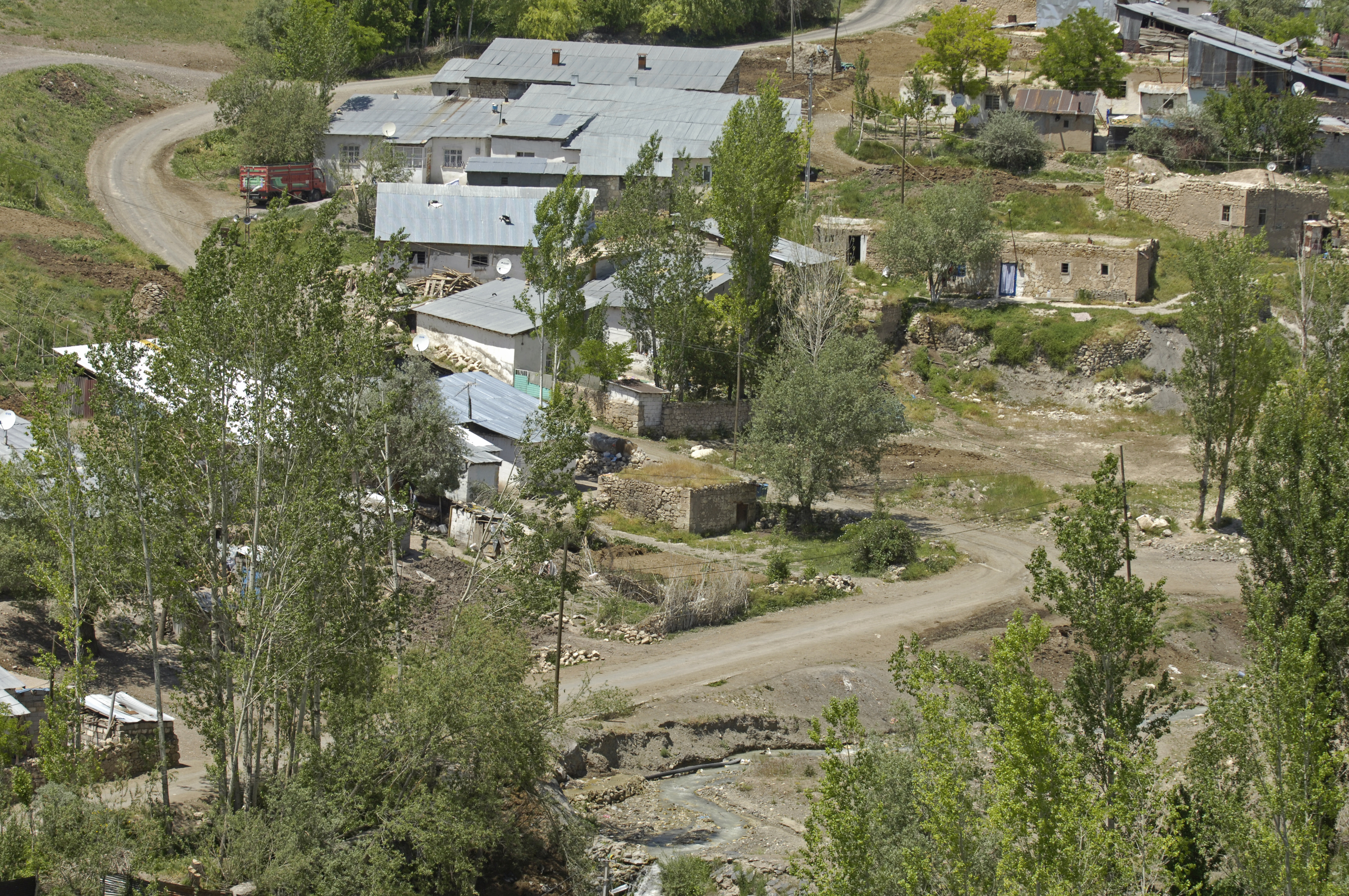
View of Tercan

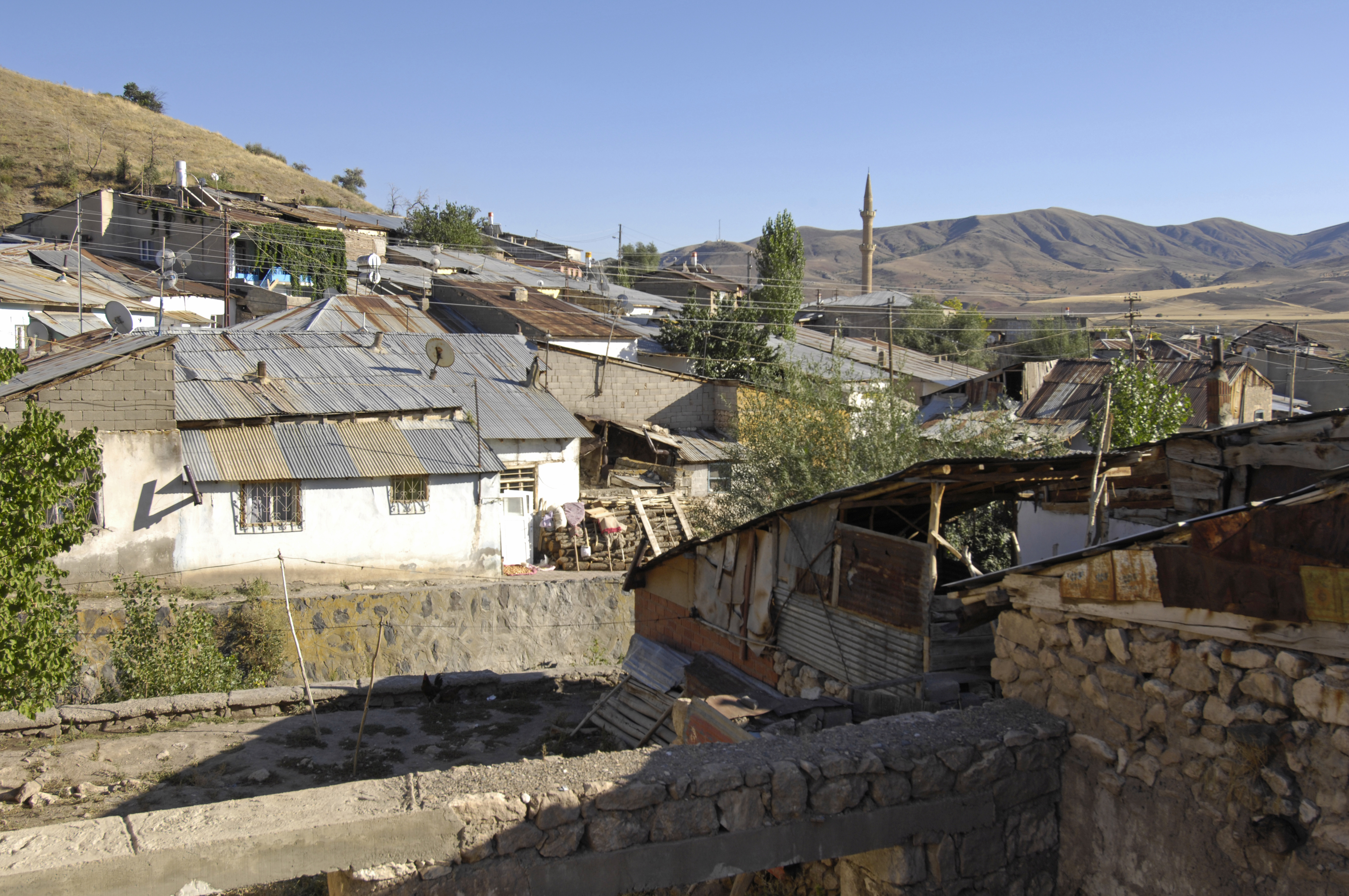
View of Tercan

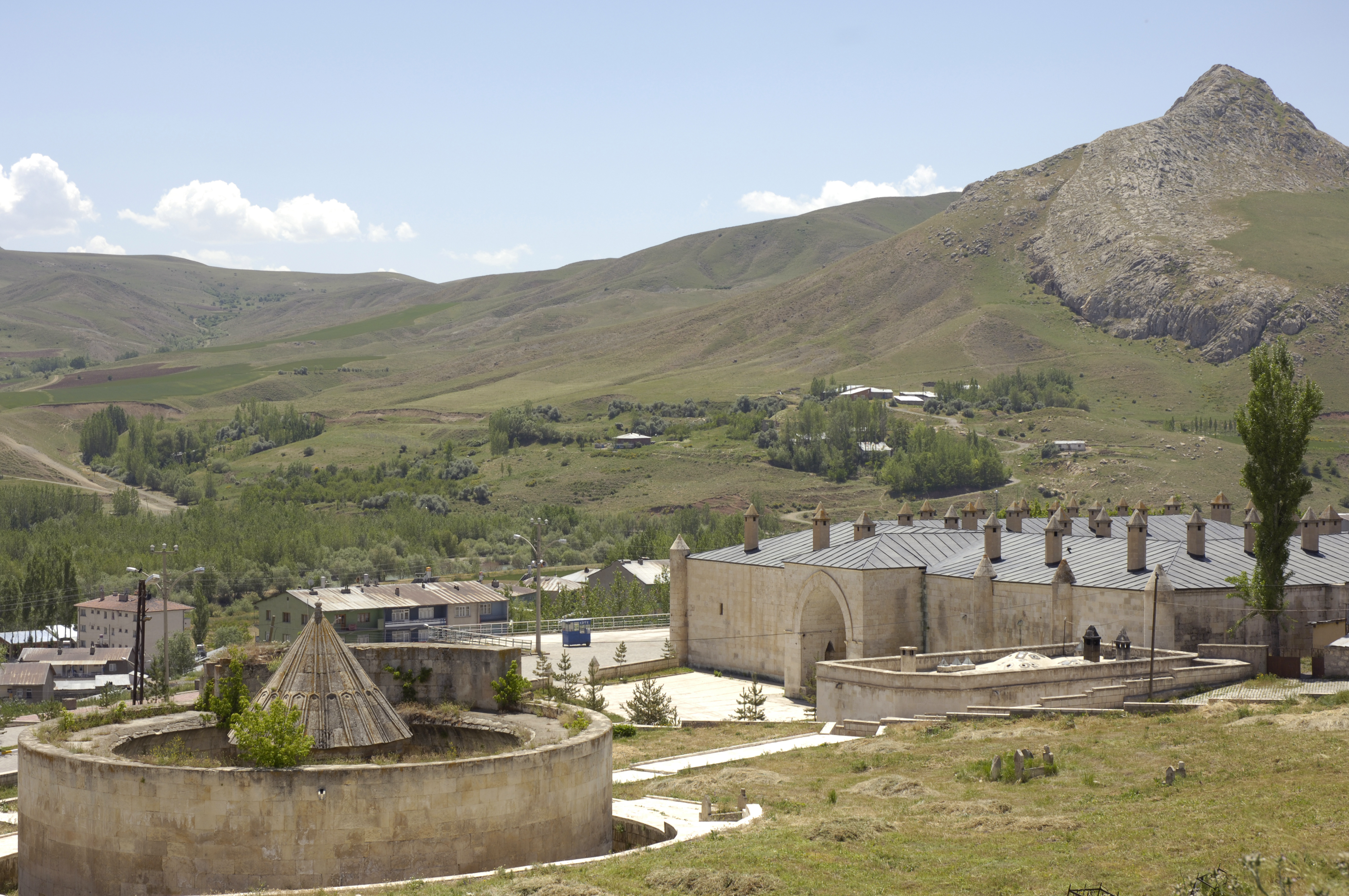
View showing both the caravanserai and türbe

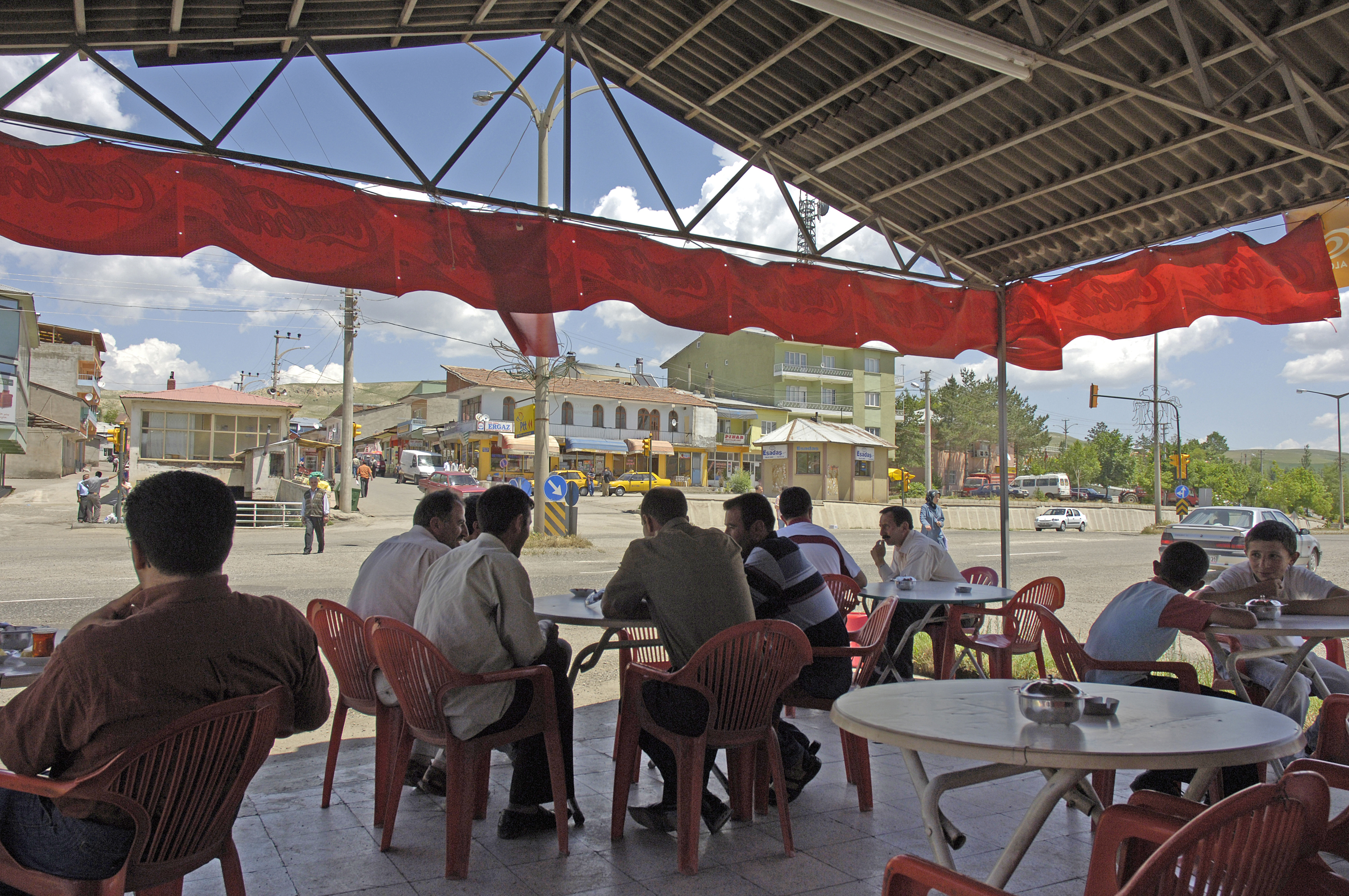
Outdoor seating area in the middle of town

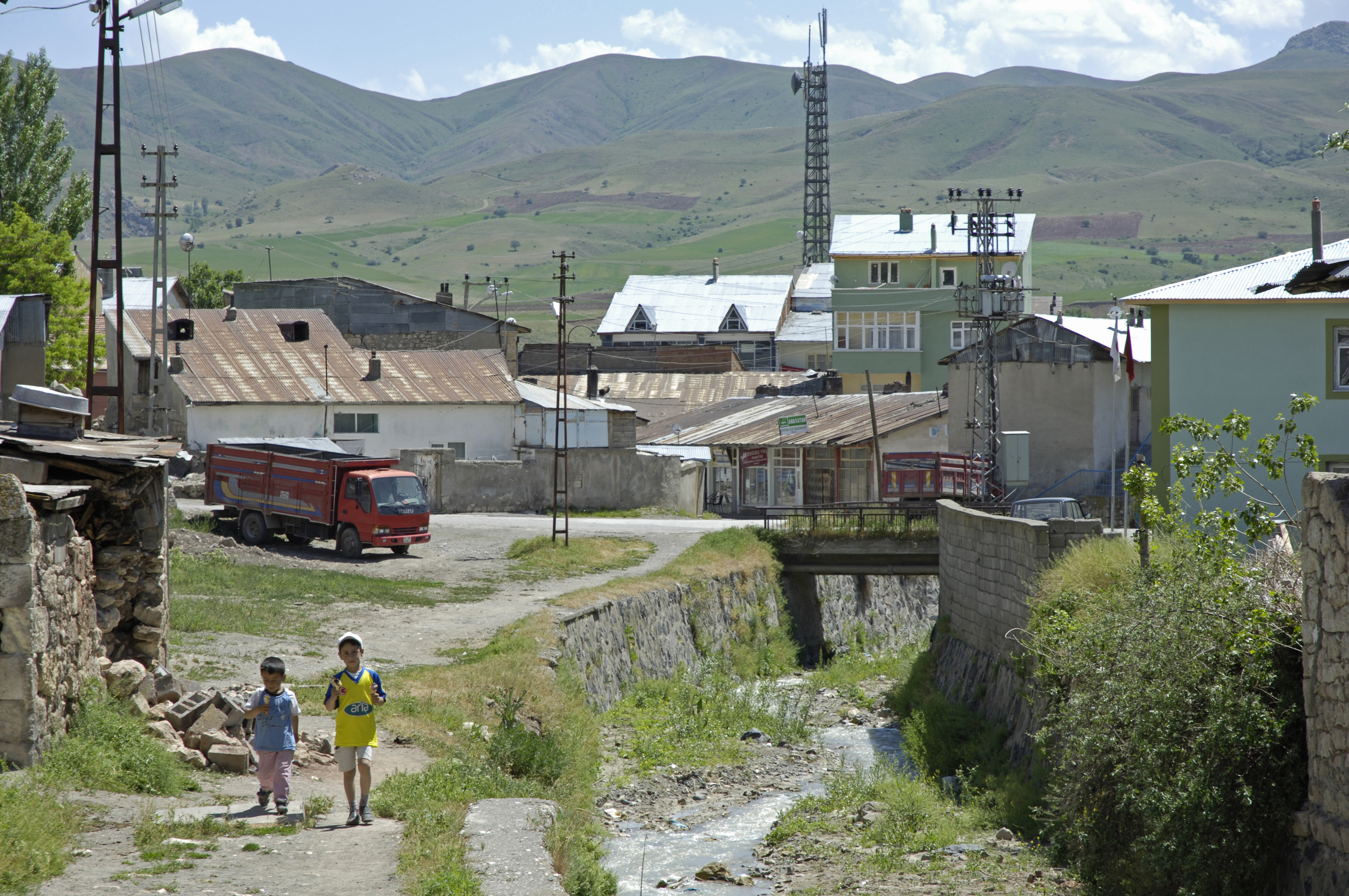
View of Tercan

== See also ==
- Saltukids
- Melike Mama Hatun
