= Princely rebellion =

Type of civil war in absolute monarchies

A princely rebellion or princely revolt is an intrastate armed conflict by a prince (or princess) against a reigning monarch of their own family, the ruling dynasty. A prince may rebel against a well-established monarch (usually his father, brother, or uncle, or sometimes mother) in order to seize the throne for himself immediately (either because he is impatient to wait for the current monarch to die or abdicate, or wants to prevent potential rivals from acceding first), to ensure his supposed right to sit on the throne in the future, or to secure other rights, privileges or interests such as appanages, alliances or sources of revenue that the monarch allegedly encroached upon, or failed to deliver or guarantee.

Like wars of succession, princely rebellions were a common type of war in human history, but have seldom occurred after 1900 due to the disappearance of absolute monarchies.

== Terminology ==
Princely rebellions or revolts may also be described with ambiguous terms such as 'dynastic struggles/conflicts' or 'succession struggles/conflicts/disputes', but they aren't always synonymous. Although these terms are sometimes used interchangeably with wars of succession, princely rebellions are not (necessarily) caused by succession crises, but directed against well-established monarchs which are commonly recognised as legitimate. (Note: The monarch is not necessarily widely popular at the start of the princely rebellion, but their legitimacy needs to be broadly recognised. If their legitimacy is commonly questioned if they recently began their reign, however, the situation is commonly described as a succession crisis in which the monarch has acceded to the throne, or is trying to, without broad support. If a prince starts a war against this newly acceded/acceding monarch, it is more aptly described as a 'war of succession' than as a 'princely rebellion', because the word 'rebellion' implies that the current monarch enjoys broadly supported legitimacy and the prince does not (yet), and because the war is motivated by challenging the acceding monarch's very right to rule itself rather than securing the prince's interests during the remainder of that monarch's rule.) Scholars sometimes disagree which term fits a certain conflict best, for example the 1657–1661 Mughal dynastic conflict, which consisted of several subconflicts, phases, and factions. (Note: Faruqui (2012) decided 'not to count the conflict between Aurangzeb and his brothers (1657–9) as a rebellion. This is an arguable choice since the conflict started out as a rebellion against Shah Jahan but then morphed into a succession struggle once Shah Jahan had been forced to abdicate his throne in the summer of 1658.' He regarded it as a 'war of succession', while noting that S. M. Azizuddin Husain (2002) did characterise it as a 'rebellion'.) Both types of conflict could have the same causes, however, such as the creation of collateral dynastic branches, which stimulated wars of succession upon a monarch's death, as well as princely revolts by cadets and cousins while they were still alive.

Princely revolts are also to be distinguished from broader nobles' rebellions (such as The Fronde, the Second Barons' War, the Revolt of the Three Feudatories, or the 1626 rebellion by Mughal nobleman Mahabat Khan), which may involve participants from (only) other aristocratic families.

== Africa ==
=== Egypt ===
- Ptolemaic war (132–124 BCE), between Cleopatra II and Ptolemy VIII Physcon over the rightful succession of Ptolemy VI Philometor.

=== Libya ===
- 1817, 1826, and July 1832–1835: Mehmed Karamanli's rebellions against the bey Yusuf Karamanli of Tripoli. Yusuf abdicated in favour of his son Ali II Karamanli in August 1832. This transfer of power did not appease unrest, and Mehmed Karamanli continued to claim the throne for himself with support of various tribes who revolted due to Yusuf's recent tax increase.

=== Nigeria ===
- 1845–1851: Lagos succession dispute. Kosoko against his nephew oba Akitoye of Lagos, who had been enthroned in 1841. It started with the Ogun Olomiro (Salt Water War) of July 1845, which brought Kosoko into power, and ended with the British-backed Akitoye returning with the Reduction of Lagos in 1851.

== Asia ==
=== Burmese Empire ===
- February 1782: princely rebellion against king Singu Min of the Konbaung dynasty, in which Singu was killed, Phaungkaza Maung Maung seized the throne for seven days, before Bodawpaya killed him as well and replaced him.

=== Chinese Empire ===
Some examples include:

- 657–651 BCE: The Li Ji Unrest or Rebellion was a series of destabilising events in the ancient Chinese state of Jin, wrought by Duke Xian of Jin's concubine Li Ji, who sought (and briefly succeeded) in discrediting many princes of the ducal family, in order to put her own son Xiqi on the Jin throne.
- 635 BCE: Prince Dai of Eastern Zhou's rebellion against his brother, King Xiang of Zhou, who managed to keep his throne with the assistance of the state of Jin.
- 154 BCE: Rebellion of the Seven States by princes of the Western Han dynasty.
- 91 BCE: Rebellion of Liu Ju.
- 1510: Prince of Anhua rebellion by Zhu Zhifan.
- 1519: Prince of Ning rebellion by Zhu Chenhao.

=== Indonesia ===
- 1619: Kuti rebellion against Jayanegara of Majapahit..
- 1674–1681: Trunajaya rebellion by the Madurese prince Trunajaya against Amangkurat I of the Mataram Sultanate. With the latter's ousting and death in 1677, it also became a war of succession between Amangkurat II and his brother Prince Puger (who became Trunajaya's co-belligerent).

=== Israelite kingdom ===
- (historicity contested) c. 1000 BCE Absalom's revolt at Hebron according to 2 Samuel.
- 40–38 BC Antigonus' rebellion against Hyrcanus II as part of the Parthian invasion of 40 BC

=== Mughal Empire ===
==== Dynamics ====
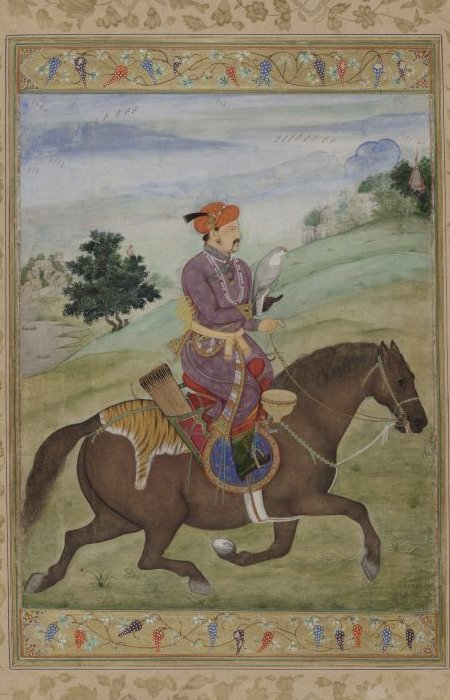
As a prince, Jahangir rebelled against his father Akbar; as emperor, he faced rebellions by his own sons Khusrau and Khurram.

In the Mughal Empire (1526–1857), an Islamic dynasty in the Indian subcontinent, princely rebellions revolved around the tensions between the expected solemn loyalty to the supposed absolute authority of the emperor and the imperial court on the one hand, which rejected the very idea of rebellion as unacceptable disobedience, and the alleged patrimonial rights violations, imperial malice and unfair dealings by the emperor towards the princes, against which efforts to justify and conduct princely revolts were made. According to Faruqui (2012), there were "seven significant princely rebellions" from 1526 to 1707, five of which took place during "the high period of Mughal rule (1585–1680s)". From 1556 to 1606, these focused especially on the entitlement of princes to appanages (a province of the empire to govern personally as a semi-independent kingdom), and their right to rebel if the emperor broke his supposed promise of granting appanages to princes, as this was "imperial encroachment on their territory". However, the Mughal emperors managed to centralise and increase their powers by abolishing the system, and successfully crushed all princely rebellions (the last in 1606 by Khusrau Mirza against his father, emperor Jahangir) against its abolition. The focus of princely revolts thereafter shifted towards the princes' entitlement to an equal claim upon the imperial throne and the realm's entire territory after the monarch's death. This meant that the princes opposed the designation of an heir, let alone any fixation of the order of succession, and would wage war against the emperor whenever they felt that this entitlement was being undermined in some way.

==== Major princely rebellions ====
1. 1540–1552 rebellion: Kamran Mirza against his brother, emperor Humayun, over the imperial throne and Kamran's appanage of Kabul.
2. 1561–1566 (and 1581–1582) rebellion: Mirza Muhammad Hakim against his brother, emperor Akbar, over the imperial throne and Hakim's appanage of Kabul.
3. 1599–1604 rebellion: Salim (later Jahangir) against his father, emperor Akbar, over Salim's appanage of Allahabad.
4. 1606 rebellion: Khusrau Mirza against his father, emperor Jahangir, for breaking his promise to grant Khusrau the governorship of Bengal.
5. 1622–1627 rebellion: Khurram (later Shah Jahan) against his father, emperor Jahangir, over his right to imperial succession in the face of Shahryar Mirza possibly becoming the designated heir.
6. 1659 rebellion: Muhammad Sultan against his father Aurangzeb.
7. 1681 rebellion: Muhammad Akbar against his father, emperor Aurangzeb.

Although all Mughal emperors faced opposition by princes and often princely rebellions, none of the major rebellions succeeded, and no emperor was ever killed by a prince.

==== Historiography ====
According to Faruqui (2012), official court chroniclers showed a strong tendency to engage in what he termed 'post-rebellion apologetics', in an effort to downplay the seriousness of dynastic conflicts to the harmony within the royal family, the impact on the political and socio-economic stability of the empire, and to minimise or deflect the blame away from the main players in order to exonerate them. In attempts to restore the sense of quasi-infallibility of the emperor, and the princely loyalty to him, blame is placed on the bad or malicious influences of advisers and allies around the princes and the emperor. It was, after all, only ever other people who deceived and manipulated the 'young and impressionable' prince, led him astray, and forced him to reluctantly rebel against his own father, the wise and mighty emperor who represented the cosmic order. On the other hand, the ill advice of unfaithful courtiers are to be held responsible for the emperor's failure to prevent the rebellion, with the emperor's inexperience or 'simple nature' (in the case of Akbar) providing further mitigating circumstances.

Even linguistically, the official chronicles took care to avoid controversial words like fitna ("internal/civil war", "intra-Muslim war/strife"), preferring instead mukhalafat ("opposition"), fasad ("mischief/corruption"), and shorish ("rebellion/revolt"), and thus be lenient in their criticism of princely-imperial conflicts. No such care was taken when describing noble-led rebellions, however, such as the 1626 failed rebellion by nobleman Mahabat Khan, which is frequently labelled a fitna and other more incendiary and powerfully negative terms of condemnation in order to stress how completely unacceptable such heretical disobedience to the emperor supposedly was. By contrast, princely rebellions were tacitly permitted as a justifiable option of last resort in certain situations.

=== Empire of Trebizond ===
- 1284–1285: rebellions against John II of Trebizond, whose early reign was unstable, having gained the throne after his brother emperor George of Trebizond was betrayed and overthrown in 1280, the 1281 Papadopoulos revolt against John II, and the Siege of Trebizond (1282) by David VI of Georgia while John was getting married in Constantinople.
  - 1284: unsuccessful rebellion by John's brother, the former emperor George.
  - 1284–1285: successful rebellion by John's half-sister, Theodora of Trebizond (enthroned with the help of David VI of Georgia), who reigned as empress for several months, while John probably took refuge in Tripolis. John II managed to reassert his reign some time in 1285.

== Europe ==
=== Byzantine Empire ===
- Byzantine civil war of 1373–1379, which began as a rebellion of crown prince Andronikos IV Palaiologos against his father emperor John V Palaiologos of the Byzantine Empire. Andronikos managed to capture and imprison his father and ascend to the throne (1376), but John managed to escape and re-establish his reign (1379).

=== England ===
- Revolt of 1173–1174. Rebellion of princes Henry the Young King, Richard, Duke of Aquitaine and Geoffrey, Duke of Brittany with their mother, queen Eleanor of Aquitaine, against their father king Henry II of England
- Despenser War (1321–22). A baronial revolt against Edward II of England led by the Marcher Lords Roger Mortimer and Humphrey de Bohun. The rebellion was fuelled by opposition to Hugh Despenser the Younger, the royal favourite.
- Invasion of England (1326). An invasion by Roger Mortimer and Queen Isabella against her husband Edward II of England leading to his deposition.
- Epiphany Rising (1400), a rebellion against king Henry IV of England by noblemen loyal to Richard II of England who had been deposed in June 1399.
- In 1455, the Wars of the Roses started off as a princely rebellion by Richard of York against Henry VI of England in 1455 but continued as a war of succession between the House of Lancaster and the House of York.

=== Francia and Kingdom of France ===
- c. 560: Chram against his father Chlothar I.
- 1407–1435: Armagnac–Burgundian Civil War, a war between French princes over the regency for Charles VI of France
- 1465: War of the Public Weal, a rebellion of French princes against king Louis XI.

=== Georgia ===
- 1386–1389: First Imeretian war of independence, a rebellion led by Alexander I of Imereti to recreate an independent Kingdom of Western Georgia for his branch of the Bagrationi dynasty against Bagrat V of Georgia.
- 1396–1401: Second Imeretian war of independence, a continuation of Alexander's rebellion led by Constantine II of Imereti against George VII of Georgia.

=== Holy Roman Empire ===
- 1104–1106: Henry's (V) rebellion against his father Henry IV, Holy Roman Emperor.
- 1350–1361: Gelderse Broederstrijd, which saw Edward, Duke of Guelders rebel against his older brother Reginald III, Duke of Guelders, who had been duke since 1343. Behind the curtains, it was the noble families Van Heeckeren and Van Bronckhorst pulling the strings on the teenage brothers.
- 1459, 1465–1468, 1471–1473: rebellion of Adolf, Duke of Guelders against his father Arnold, Duke of Guelders. The war ended when duke Charles the Bold of Burgundy imprisoned Adolf in 1471, Arnold proclaimed Charles the steward of Guelders in late 1471, and Arnold pledged (pawned) the whole Duchy of Guelders and County of Zutphen to Charles in 1471 or 1472. Finally, Arnold died on 23 February 1473, and Charles the Bold militarily conquered Guelders (including a brief siege of Nijmegen) in March 1473. (Note: Charles the Bold had also purchased Gerhard VII, Duke of Jülich-Berg's claimed rights to Guelders in the year 1473.)

=== Kievan Rus' ===
- Rebellion of Mstislav of Chernigov (1024–1026). In the aftermath of the Kievan succession crisis of 1015–1019 following the death of Volodimer I of Kiev, Yaroslav the Wise gained the throne of Kiev and consolidated his power. A few years later, one of his other brothers, prince Mstislav of Chernigov, rebelled and tried to seize Kiev in Yaroslav's absence, but failed. Yaroslav then attacked, but was defeated at the Battle of Listven. Two years later, the brothers agreed to divide Kievan Rus' along the Dnipro.
- Rebellion of Vseslav of Polotsk (1065–1069). This conflict began when prince Vseslav of Polotsk claimed agnatic seniority over grand prince Iziaslav Yaroslavich of Kiev. Due to the Kiev uprising of 1068, he briefly secured the throne.
- Chernihiv internecine war (1226), between Michael of Chernihiv and Oleh of Kursk. Although the war was evidently about who would succeed Mstislav II Svyatoslavich (who was killed in the Battle of the Kalka River in 1223) as prince of Chernihiv, it took place three years after his death, suggesting that Michael was already well-established as prince before Oleh revolted against his rule. Oleh attempted to change the decisions made at the 1206 Chernihiv Congress.

=== Lithuania ===
- Lithuanian Civil War (1381–1384): broke out when Algirdas' brother Kęstutis rebelled against Algirdas' son Jogaila and claimed the throne for himself while Jogaila was besieging Algirdas' other son Andrei at Polotsk. Jogaila and Andrei were half-brothers, already fighting a war over the succession of their father Algirdas since 1377; Kęstutis had initially recognised Jogaila, and had supported him in his conflict against Andrei.
- Lithuanian Civil War (1389–1392): Kęstutis' son Vytautas rebelled against Jogaila and his son Skirgaila.

=== Moldavia ===
- Gheorghe Ștefan's rebellion against Vasile Lupu, Prince of Moldavia (1653), who was deposed by his own boyars
  - Moldavian campaign of Tymofiy Khmelnytsky (1653)

=== Poland ===
- 8 September 1373 – March 1377: Władysław the White's Rebellion against Louis I of Hungary, who had been crowned king of Poland on 17 November 1370.

=== Portugal ===
- 1640–1668: Portuguese Restoration War. Rebellion of the Forty Conspirators led by the Duke of Braganza, John IV, against Philip III of Portugal. John's grandfather João I, Duke of Braganza in 1565 married Catherine, granddaughter of Manuel I of Portugal. Philip III's grandfather was Philip II of Spain (Habsburg), grandson of Manuel I of Portugal. During the War of the Portuguese Succession (1580–1583), cousins Catherine and Philip II both claimed the Portuguese throne, and the latter won, acceding as Philip I of Portugal. Thus the House of Habsburg became the ruling dynasty of Portugal. The Portuguese Restoration War essentially continued the dynastic conflict fought between the intertwined houses of Braganza and Habsburg two generations earlier, but this time Braganza won.

=== Serbia ===
- Serbian civil war of 1331: Stefan Dušan's rebellion against his father, king Stefan Dečanski of medieval Serbia.

=== Spain ===
- 1808: Tumult of Aranjuez. An uprising against by supporters of crown prince Ferdinand against his father Charles IV. Ferdinand unsuccessfully planned a coup d'état the previous year.

=== Sweden ===
- 1304–1318: Civil disorder. Rebellions of Eric and Valdemar Magnusson against their brother, king Birger of Sweden and his regent and protector Torkel Knutsson.

== See also ==
- List of Byzantine revolts and civil wars
- List of Roman civil wars and revolts

== Bibliography ==
- Braumoeller, Bear F. (2019). Only the Dead: The Persistence of War in the Modern Age. Oxford: Oxford University Press. p. 288. ISBN 9780190849542.
- Faruqui, Munis D. (2012). The Princes of the Mughal Empire, 1504–1719. Cambridge: Cambridge University Press. pp. 181–234. ISBN 9781139536752. doi:10.1017/CBO9781139135474.009
- Flint, John E. (1975). The Cambridge History of Africa: Volume 5. From c. 1790 to c. 1870. Cambridge: Cambridge University Press. ISBN 9780521207010.
- Holsti, Kalevi (1991). Peace and War: Armed Conflicts and International Order, 1648–1989. Cambridge: Cambridge University Press. p. 379. ISBN 9780521399296.
- (Appendix) Kokkonen, Andrej; Sundell, Anders (September 2017). Online supplementary appendix for "The King is Dead: Political Succession and War in Europe, 1000–1799" (PDF). Gothenburg: University of Gothenburg. p. 40.
- Ooi, Keat Gin (2004). Southeast Asia: A Historical Encyclopedia, from Angkor Wat to East Timor. ABC-CLIO. p. 1791. ISBN 9781576077702.
- Martin, Janet (1995). Medieval Russia, 980–1584. Cambridge: Cambridge University Press. p. 450. ISBN 9780521368322.
- Martin, Janet (2007). Medieval Russia: 980–1584. Second Edition. E-book. Cambridge: Cambridge University Press. ISBN 978-0-511-36800-4.
- Sandberg, Brian (2016). War and Conflict in the Early Modern World: 1500–1700. Cambridge: Polity Press. p. 284. ISBN 9781509503025.
