= Kingdom of Imereti =

Georgian kingdom (1463–1810)

Kingdom of Imereti იმერეთის სამეფო
- 1463–1810
- Final coat of arms of the Kingdom of Imereti.

- The Kingdom of Imereti in 1490
- Capital: Kutaisi
- Common languages: Georgian
- Religion: Eastern Orthodox Christianity
- Government: Monarchy
- King
  - 1463–1478: Bagrat II (first)
  - 1789–1810: Solomon II (last)
- History
  - Established: 1463
  - Independence from Georgia: 1490
  - Vassal of the Ottoman Empire: 29 May 1555
  - Vassal of the Russian Empire: 25 April 1804
  - Russian Annexation: 20 February 1810
Preceded by	Succeeded by
Kingdom of Georgia	Russian Empire
- Today part of: Georgia

Kingdom of Imereti under Bagrat III after annexing Samtskhe-Saatabago in 1535

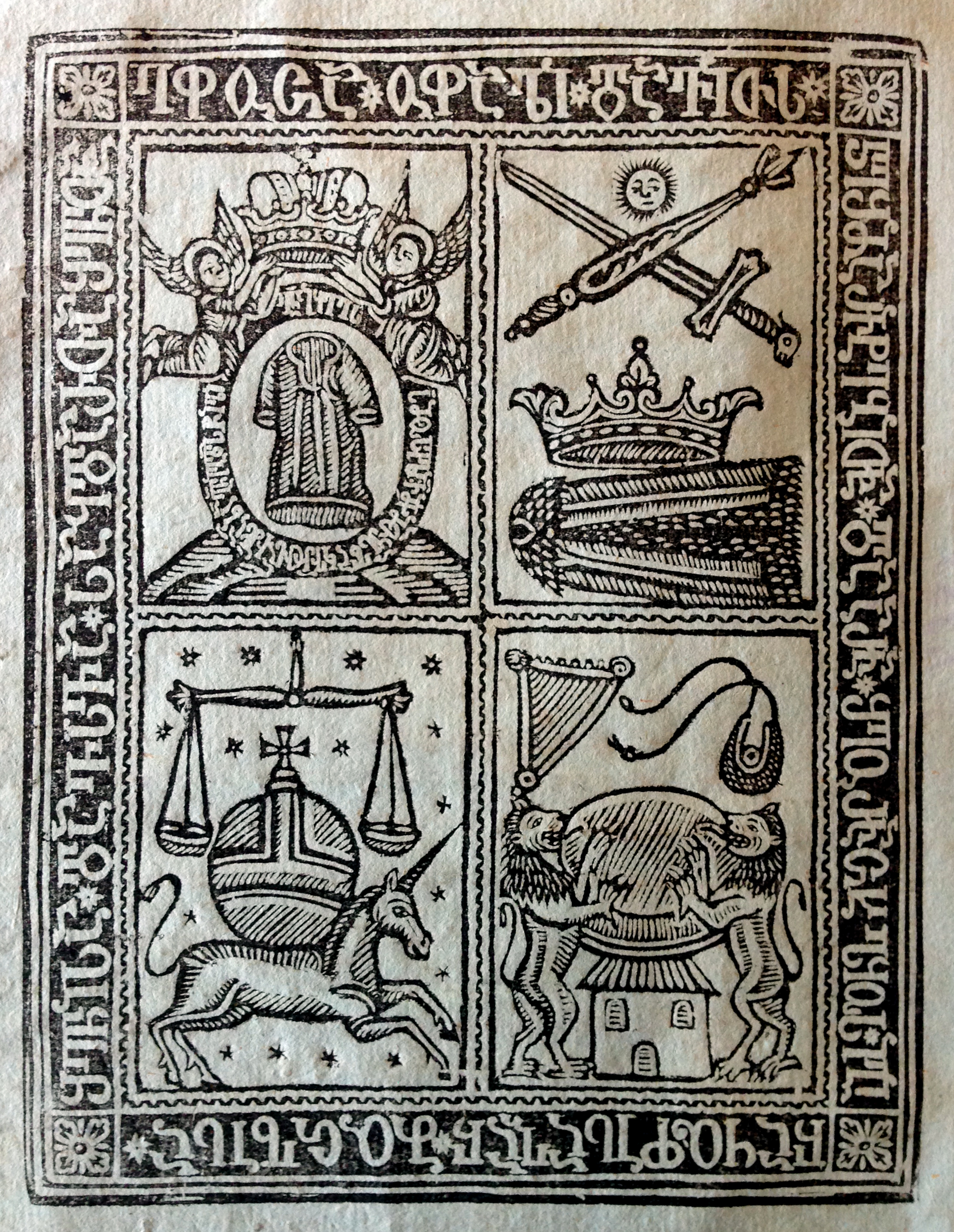
Royal symbols of Imereti, 1803.

The Kingdom of Imereti (Georgian: იმერეთის სამეფო, romanized: imeretis samepo) was a Georgian monarchy established in 1463 by a member of the house of Bagrationi when the Kingdom of Georgia was dissolved into rival kingdoms. Before that time, Imereti was considered a separate kingdom within the Kingdom of Georgia, of which a cadet branch of the Bagrationi royal family held the crown.

The realm was conquered by George V the Brilliant and once again united with the east Kingdom of Georgia. From 1463 onward, however, Imereti became a constant battleground between Georgian and Ottoman forces for several centuries, resulting in the kingdom's progressive decline due to this ongoing instability. These threats pushed local Georgian rulers to seek closer ties with Tsardom of Russia. In 1649, Imereti sent ambassadors to the Russian royal court and Russia returned favor in 1651. In the presence of Russian ambassadors, Alexander III of Imereti swore an oath of allegiance to Tsar Alexis of Russia. However, internal conflicts among Georgian royalty continued and, although Alexander III briefly managed to control all of Western Georgia, this consolidation was short lived. By the time of his death in 1660, Western Georgia was still in a state of flux. In this chaotic period, Archil II was enthroned and deposed several times. His efforts to secure assistance from Russia and, later, Pope Innocent XII proved unsuccessful and he was finally exiled to Russia.

Under pressure from Pavel Tsitsianov, in 1804 Solomon II of Imereti accepted Russian Imperial suzerainty, only to be deposed entirely in 1810. During the time that Imereti was a vassal state, the Mingrelia, Abkhazia and Guria princedoms declared their independence from Imereti and established their own governments.

== Kings of Imereti ==
=== First House of Imereti ===
- David VI (1258–1293)
- Constantine I (1293–1326)
- Michael (1326–1329)
- Bagrat I (1329–1330)
- Vacant (1330–1387)
- Alexandre I (1387–1389)
- George I (1389–1392)
- Vacant (1392–1396)
- Constantine II (1396–1401)
- Demetrius I (1401–1455), only recognized as Duke by Alexander I of Georgia

=== Bagrationi dynasty of Imereti ===
- Bagrat II (1463–1478)
- Alexander II (1484–1510)
- Bagrat III (1510–1565)
- George II (1565–1585)
- Levan (1585–1590)
- Rostom (1590–1605)
- George III (1605–1639)
- Alexander III (1639–1660)
- Bagrat IV (1660–1661, 1663–1668, 1669–1678, 1679–1681)
- Archil II (1661–1663, 1678–1679, 1690–1691, 1695–1696, 1698)
- Demetrius Gurieli (1663–1664)
- George III Gurieli (1681–1683)
- Alexander IV (1683–1690, 1691–1695)
- Simon (1698–1701)
- George IV (1696–1698)
- Mamia III Gurieli (1701–1702, 1711, 1713)
- George V (Giorgi-Malakia Abashidze) (1702–1707)
- George VI (1703–1711, 1712–1713, 1714–1716, 1719–1720)
- George IV Gurieli (1716)
- Alexander V (1720–1741, 1741–1746, 1749–1752)
- George VII (1741)
- Mamuka (1746–1749)
- Solomon I (1752–1766, 1768–1784)
- Teimuraz (1766–1768)
- David II (1784–1789)
- Solomon II (1789–1790)

=== Heirs of King of Solomon I of Imereti ===
The dynastic senior line of the Imeretian Bagrationi since 1784. In Russia, its representatives bore the title of His Serene Highness the Princes of Bagration-Imereti (since June 20, 1865).

- Alexander (VI) Georgievich, great-grandson of Solomon I and grandson of Solomon II's cousin (23 April 1784 / 7 February 1815 — 5 February 1862)
- Alexander (VII) Dmitrievich, His nephew (5 February 1862 — 17 November 1880)
- Alexander (VIII) Aleksandrovich, His son (17 November 1880 — after 1901)
×

=== Heirs of Prince Bagrat of Imereti (1741–1800) ===
Dynastically the second line of Imereti Bagrationi since 1784. In Russia its representatives bore the title of Lightest Princes Bagration (since June 20, 1865).

- Prince Bagrat of Imereti (1741–1800) (23 April 1784 — 1800)
- David III Bagratovich, his son, Solomon II's cousin (1804 / 7 February 1815 — 1 September 1820)
- Ivan (I) Davidovich, his son (1 September 1820 — 9 May 1869)
- Alexander (VI) Ivanovich, his son (9 May 1869 — 7 February 1895)
- David (IV) Aleksandrovich, his son and the last male representative of this branch (shot ) (7 February 1895 — 30 September 1937)
- Svimon Rostomovich (30 September 1937 — 1951)
- Irakli (I) Grigolovich (1925—2013) (30 September 1937 / 1951—2013), son of Grigol
- David (V) Iraklievich (born 1948) (2013–2017), son of Irakli. transmitted his headship to his son
- Irakli (II) Davidovich (born 1982), son of David. (from 6 May 2017)

=== Heirs of King of David II of Imereti ===
Since Solomon II of Imereti had no sons, he proclaimed Prince Constantine, son of king David II of Imereti, and his male-line senior descendants as heirs to the throne of the Kingdom of Imereti.

- Hereditary Prince Constantine (I) (7 February 1815–3 May 1844), son of king David II
- Constantine (II) (3 May 1844–15 December 1885), son of Prince Constantine (I)
- Mikheil (15 December 1885–1888), son of Prince Constantine (II)
- George (I) (1888–26 March 1932), son of Prince Mikheil
- George (II) (26 March–24 March 1972), son of Prince George (I), had no issue
- Constantine (III) (March 1972–20 November 1978), young brother of George (II)
- Princess Thamar (would have been Head of House from 1978), daughter of Prince Mikheil Imeretinsky (1900–1975), younger brother of Constantine (III)

After the death of Hereditary Prince Constantine (III) (1898–1978), because the male-offspring of this branch came to end, the headship of the House of Bagrationi-Imereti transmitted to Prince Irakli Bagrationi (1925–2013), son of Prince Grigol, the male-line descendant of Prince Bagrat, younger brother of King Solomon I of Imereti (1752–1784).

×

== See also ==
Genealogy of Imereti houses after the division of the Georgian kingdom into three parts

Bagrations (Kings of Georgia)	Bagrations (Kings of Imereti)
Constantine I (1369–1412); King of Georgia; 1407–1412	Demetrius; Duke of Imereti; 1401–1455
Dulandukht Orbeliani	Alexander I (1386–1446); King of Georgia; 1412–1442	Tamar	Bagrat co-king	Georges co-king 1408–1412	Gulkhan († 1471)
Vakhtang IV (1413–1446); King of Georgia; 1442–1446	A daughter	Demetrius (c. 1413 – 1453) co-king with Alexander I 1433–1442, with Vakhtang IV; 1442–1446	George VIII (1417–1476); Kings of Georgia; 1446–1462; King of Kartli-Kakheti; 1462–1466; King of Kakheti as George I 1466–1476	David	Zaal	Bagrat II (1439–1478); King of Imereti as Bagrat II; 1462–1466; King of kartli-Imereti; 1466–1478
branch of Kartli	branch of Kakheti	Alexander II; King of Imereti (1484–1510)
Bagrat III (1495-1565); King of Imereti; 1510–1565	Vakhtang; Prince of Imereti († 1548)
George II; King of Imereti; 1565–1585	Constantine; Prince of Imereti († 1587)	Teimuraz
Levan (c. 1573 – 1590); King of Imereti; 1585–1590	Rostom (1561–1605); King of Imereti; 1588–1589; 1590–1605	George III; King of Imereti; 1605–1639	Bagrat IV; King of Imereti; 1589–1590
Alexander III († 1660); King of Imereti; 1639–1660
Bagrat IV; King of Imereti; 1660–1661, 1663–1668, 1669–1678, 1679–1681
Alexander IV; King of Imereti; 1683–1690, 1691–1695
Simon; King of Imereti; 1698–1701	George VII; King of Imereti; 1703–1720
Alexander V King of Imereti; 1720–1741, 1741–1746, 1749–1752	Mamuka; King of Imereti; 1746–1749 († 1769)	George IX (1718–1778); King of Imereti; 1741
Solomon I (1735–1784); King of Imereti; 1752–1766, 1768–1784	Prince Bagrat (VI) (1741 † 1800); Head of the House of Imereti; 23 April 1784 — 1800	Archil († 1775)	Teimuraz; King of Imereti (1766–1768) ×	David II (1755 † 1795); King of Imereti; 1784–1789
Prince Alexander (1760 † 1780)	David (III) (1781 † 1820); Head of the House of Imereti; 7 February 1815 — 1 September 1820	Simon (1771 †)	Solomon II (1772–1815); King of Imereti; 1789–1810 ×	Constantin (I) (1789 † 1844); Head of the House of Imereti; 7 February 1815 — 3 May 1844
Prince Giorgi (1778 † 1807)	Ivan (I) (1810 † 1869); Head of the House of Imereti; 1 September 1820 — 9 May 1869	Rostom (1791 † )	Constantine (II) (1827 † 1885); Head of the House of Imereti; 3 May 1844 — 15 December 1885
Alexander (VI) Georgievich (1796 † 1862); Head of the House of Imereti; 23 April 1784 / 7 February 1815 — 5 February 1862	Dimitry Bagrationi of Imereti (1799 † 1845)	Alexander (VI) (1851 † 1895); Head of the House of Imereti; 9 May 1869 — 7 February 1895	Simon (1812 †)	Mikheil (1843 † 1892); Head of the House of Imereti; 15 December 1885—1888
Alexander (VII) Dmitrievich (1843 † 1880); Head of the House of Imereti; 5 February 1862 — 17 November 1880	Dimitry (1846 † 1885)	David (IV) (1894 † 1937); Head of the House of Imereti; 7 February 1895 — 30 September 1937 ×	Rostom (1845 † )	Giorgi (I) (1872 † 1932); Head of the House of Imereti; 1888 — 26 March 1932
Alexander (VIII) Aleksandrovich (1879–?); 17 November 1880 — after 1901 ×	Nino (1915 † 2009)	Svimon (1874 † 1951); Head of the House of Imereti; 30 September 1937 — 1951	Grigol (1885 † 1937)	Giorgi (II) (1897 † 1972); Head of the House of Imereti; 26 March 1932 — 24 March 1972	Constantine (III) (1898 † 1978); Head of the House of Imereti; 24 March 1972 — 20 November 1978 ×	Mikheil (1900 † 1975)
Tavadi Giorgi Bagration-Japaridze (Born. 1945)	Alexander (1918 † 1940)	Irakli (I) (1925 † 2013); Head of the House of Imereti; 1951/ 20 November 1978 — 2013	Thamar (Born. 1926)	Natalia Imeretinsky (born. 1930)	Nadezhda Imeretinsky (born. 1941)
Tornike (Born. 1980)	Salome (Born. 1986)	Nargiza (Born. 1940)	David (Born. 1948); Head of the House of Imereti; 2013 — 2017	Maia (Born. 1953)	Teona Judith Smith-Dorrien-Smith (1946–1997)	Alexandra Smith-Dorrien-Smith (1948–2007))	Robert Arthur Smith-Dorrien-Smith (born. 1951)	Charlotte Sophia Smith-Dorrien-Smith (1954–1997)	James Smith-Dorrien-Smith (born. 1957)	Hon. Nino Natalia O'Hagan Strachey (born. 1968)
Ketevan (Born. 1979)	Thamar (Born. 1980)	Irakli (II) (Born. 1982); Head of the House of Imereti from 6 May 2017

== Bibliography ==
- Toumanoff, C. (1990) The dynasties of Christian Caucasus from Antiquity to the 19th century: Genealogical and chronological tables, Rome
