= Prince Bagrat of Imereti =

Prince Bagrat of Imereti may refer to the following princes from the Kingdom of Imereti:

- Prince Bagrat of Imereti (1565–1578), son of King George II of Imereti
- Bagrat (son of Prince Teimuraz of Imereti), a claimant to the throne of Imereti in 1590
- Prince Bagrat of Imereti (1741–1800), son of King Alexander V of Imereti
