= Kingdom of Western Georgia =

Western Georgian monarchy

Kingdom of Western Georgia დასავლეთ საქართველოს სამეფო dasavlet sakartvelos samepo
- 1259–1330; 1387–1392; 1396–1401
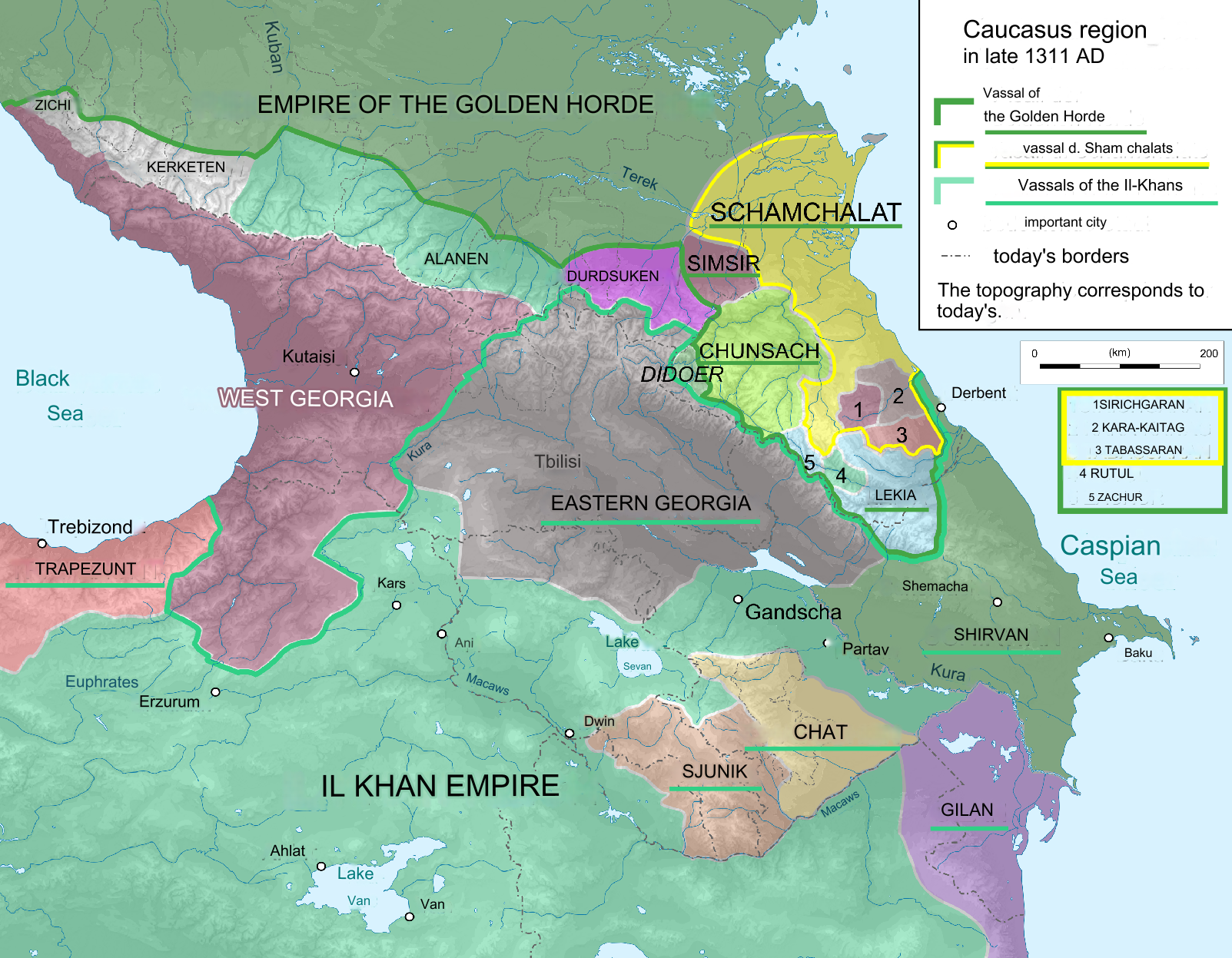
- Map of fragmented Kingdom of Georgia in 1311, with western realm in purple, and the reduced Kingdom of Eastern Georgia, the eastern part of the country, in grey
- Capital: Kutaisi
- Common languages: Middle Georgian
- Religion: Eastern Orthodox Christianity (Georgian Patriarchate)
- Government: Feudal monarchy
  - 1259–1293: David I
  - 1293–1327: Constantine I
  - 1327–1329: Michael
  - 1329–1330: Bagrat I
  - 1387–1389: Alexander I
  - 1389–1392: George I
  - 1396–1401: Constantine II
- Historical era: Late Middle Ages
Preceded by	Succeeded by
Kingdom of Georgia	Kingdom of Georgia; Kingdom of Imereti

The Kingdom of Western Georgia (Georgian: დასავლეთ საქართველოს სამეფო, romanized: dasavlet sakartvelos samepo) was a late medieval de facto independent fragmented part of the Kingdom of Georgia that emerged during the Mongol invasions of the realm, led by King David VI Narin in 1259 and later followed by his successors. During this period, the kingdom was reduced to the eastern part of the country and placed under Mongol control. Over the decades, the monarchy would fall into chaos and transform into a federation of autonomous principalities unruly of the central or regional royal power and authority.

Most of the occasions, realm would be reannexed into unified fold by the eastern Georgian kings. Nevertheless, the unified Georgian realm would de jure collapse in 1490, and western Georgia would secure an independent future under the name of Kingdom of Imereti, that would exist until 1810.

== Name of the realm ==
The question of the contemporaneous name of the realm between 1259 and the early 1400s remains without a concrete answer because from the end of the 15th century, Western Georgia extended from the modern-day city of Sochi in the north to Trebizond in the south and the Likhi Range in the east. The chronology of the adoption of this name for this state is not clear and it is plausible that some monarchs before 1490 fragmentation would style themselves as "Kings of Imereti"; however, it may well be an anachronism and that an actual change of the title would happen much later.

Indeed, upon 1259 independence pushed by King David VI Narin, he would continue to be styled as David VI, king of united Georgia. Modern historians, such as the former head of the historical department of the Tbilisi State University, Professor Nodar Asatiani, justifies the naming of the realm as the Kingdom of Western Georgia until the 15th century, demonstrating that the rulers of that fragmented state considered themselves a legitimate line of the Georgian kings who protected the Georgian nation during the Muslim invasions and were fiercely fighting for the unity. French historian Marie-Félicité Brosset also attributes the creation of the distinctive kingdom of Imereti under that name to the first coronation of King Bagrat VI in 1463.

== History ==
=== Uprising against the Mongols and early years ===
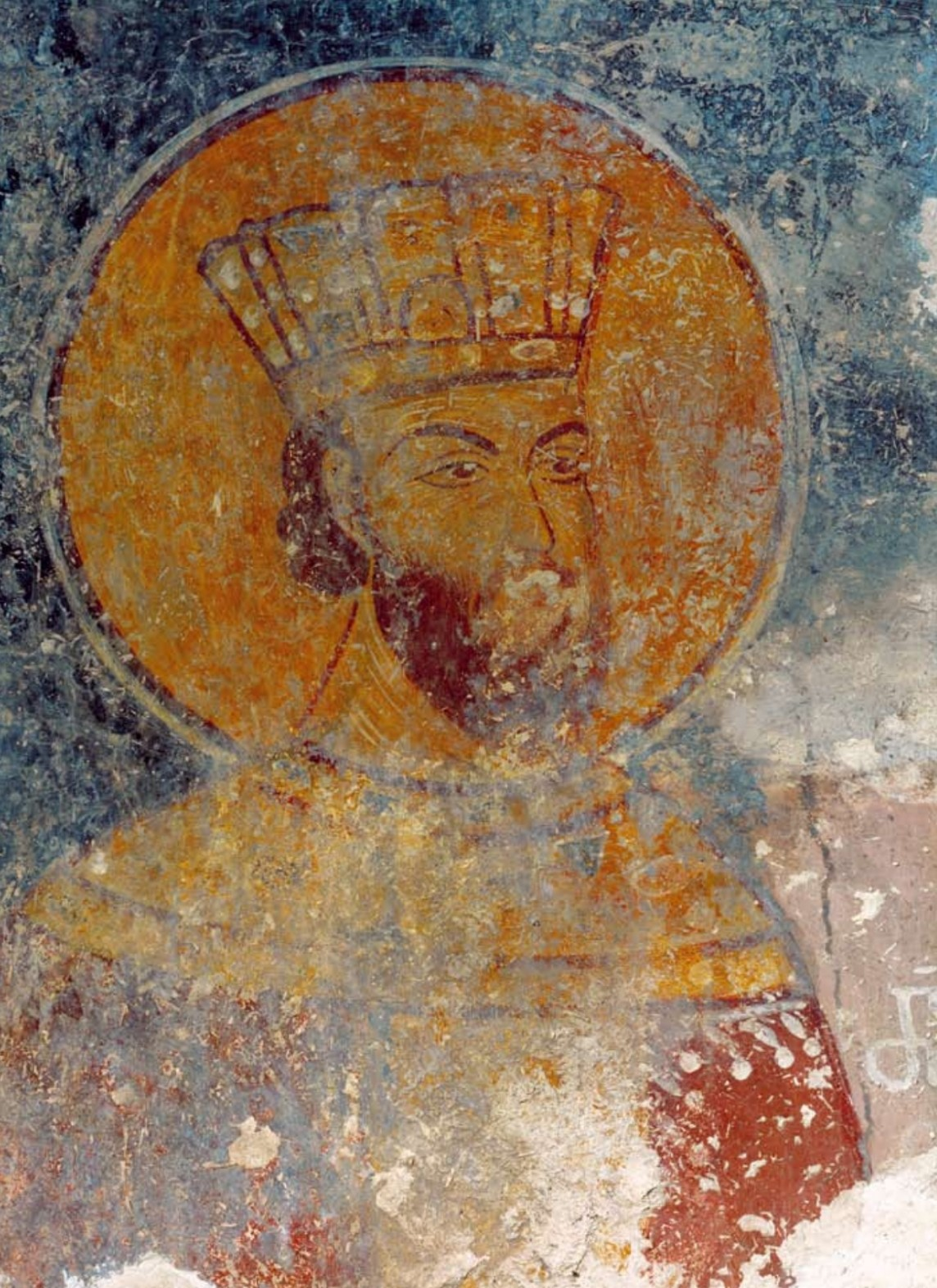
David Narin, first king of West Georgia.

From the 1220s onward, the Kingdom of Georgia faced repeated Mongol invasions led by Genghis Khan and, later, by his successors, the Ilkhanids. In 1245, the young David VI was recognized as king of Georgia by the Mongol state. The same title was granted to his cousin, David VII, in 1248, effectively dividing the Georgian kingdom between the two cousins. For nearly a decade, they ruled jointly across the country under Mongol domination. During this period, the Mongols frequently levied Georgian troops for their wars, particularly against the Isma'ilis (Assassins). This caused great discontent among the Georgian nobility, as their army was usually positioned in the forefront of the battlefield and suffered the greatest losses. Moreover, the Mongol overlords began to impose heavy taxes on the populations of the Caucasus provoked widespread popular unrest, particularly in Shirvan.

In 1259, David VI—known by the Ilkhanid authorities as Narin (“the Younger” in Mongol)—rebelled against his suzerain, without drawing his royal colleague into the revolt. The Ilkhanid Empire swiftly suppressed the uprising after several short but bloody engagements. David VI nevertheless managed to escape secretly to western Georgia via Armenia. Upon arriving in Kutaisi, one of the principal cities of western Georgia, he proclaimed the secession of the territories west of the Likhi Range and was recognized by the local nobility as king of western Georgia.

Western Georgia thus emerged as an independent kingdom, seeking to preserve Georgian culture outside the Mongol sphere of influence. At the time, the Ilkhanate was preoccupied with its military campaigns in Syria against certain Crusader states and the Mamluk Sultanate of Egypt. As a result, it refrained from direct intervention in western Georgia and instead increased the tributes imposed on eastern Georgia to compensate for the loss of tax revenues from some of the wealthiest Georgian provinces.

The kingdom founded by David VI included several powerful duchies controlling key ports on the Black Sea, notably Guria, Mingrelia, and Abkhazia, which encompassed the cities of Batumi, Poti, and Sebastopolis. (Note: According to medieval Venetian diplomats Giosafat Barbaro and Ambrogio Contarini, these three cities are dependent on the Duke of Mingrelia, who himself serves the Western King.) To the north, the kingdom controlled the duchies of Svaneti and Racha, thereby securing the Caucasus Mountains against the Golden Horde. This geopolitical position enabled the new government in Kutaisi to maintain important commercial routes with the Western world, particularly through Genoese merchants based in Abkhazia and through the Greek Empire of Trebizond. These conditions encouraged significant immigration of Georgian nobles and merchants from eastern Georgia. David VI even offered refuge to his cousin David VII Ulu and briefly shared the throne with him when the latter rebelled against Mongol rule in 1261. This arrangement proved short-lived, however, as the two rulers failed to cooperate effectively in defending western Georgia, leading to David Ulu’s return to Tbilisi by 1262.

While eastern Georgia was forced to contribute heavily to Ilkhanid military campaigns, the government in Kutaisi experienced a period of relative prosperity. This stability allowed David VI to defend his kingdom successfully against the mercenaries of the Mongol rebel Tegüder, who sought refuge in western Georgia in 1269 after the failure of his revolt against Abaqa Khan. Throughout the 1270s, the kingdom faced repeated Mongol incursions, which eventually ceased after David VI agreed to pay tribute. These conflicts nonetheless enabled the central government to abolish the rebellious duchy of Racha and annex it to the royal domain in 1278.

=== Civil war and first fall ===
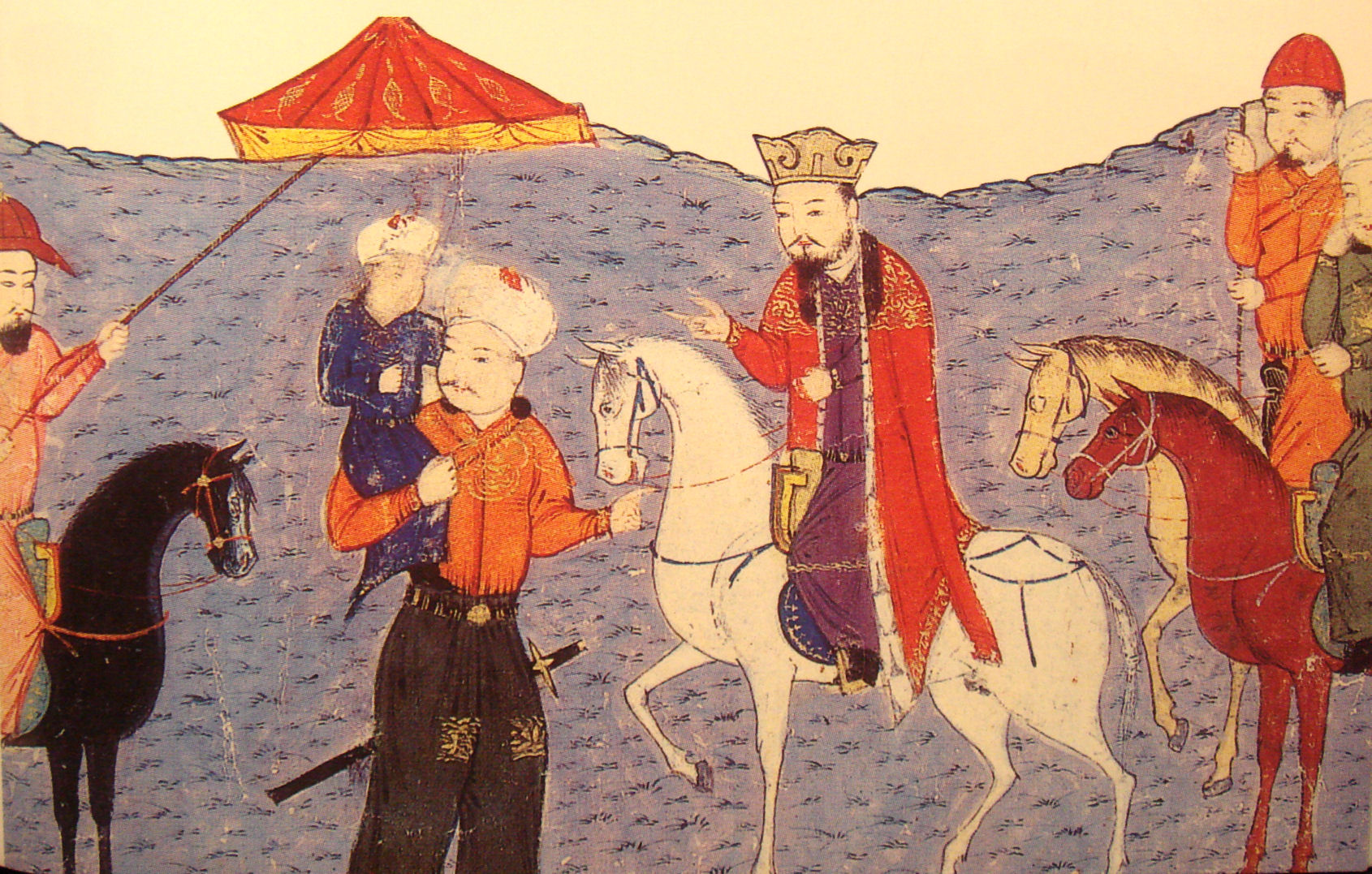
Abaqa Khan crowned Vakhtang II as King of Georgia in 1289 in an attempt to annex western Georgia.

The period of prosperity in western Georgia proved short-lived. As early as 1285, Kutaisi lost its influence over the Empire of Trebizond, which realigned its foreign policy toward the Byzantine Empire, despite a Georgian attempt to invade the empire and depose Emperor John II. In 1289, the Ilkhanid authorities sought to reunify Georgia in order to assert direct control over the entire country, appointing Vakhtang II, the eldest son and heir of David VI, as king of eastern Georgia. This plan failed following Vakhtang II’s death in 1292. David VI himself died shortly thereafter, leaving the throne of his western kingdom to Constantine I in 1293.

Western Georgia then descended into civil war following the rebellion of Prince Michael, the younger brother of Constantine I. Michael succeeded in taking control of the eastern regions of the kingdom, including Argveti, Racha, and Lechkhumi. Despite repeated attempts at reconciliation by the feudal elites of Kutaisi, the two brothers never reached an agreement. Michael was even crowned as a rival king and ultimately obtained the throne after Constantine’s death in 1327.

This internal turmoil enabled the great nobles of western Georgia to consolidate power and detach themselves from royal authority. During the conflict, the dukes of Guria, Mingrelia, and Svaneti raised their own armies, marking the beginning of a prolonged fragmentation of the region that would persist until the Russian invasion of 1810. Although King Michael attempted to reunify the royal forces, he largely failed to do so. Upon his death in 1329, the throne passed to his only son, Bagrat I.

Bagrat, known by the epithet Mtsire (“the Little”), was still a minor at the time of his accession. The absence of a regent allowed disorder to spread among the noble classes of western Georgia. In 1330, George V of Georgia, then engaged in consolidating the Georgian kingdom after expelling the Mongols from his territories, took advantage of the chaos in Kutaisi. Allied with the powerful Black Sea feudal lords, he besieged Kutaisi, captured Bagrat I, and annexed the kingdom. The Kingdom of western Georgia thus ceased to exist, seventy-one years after its foundation. Bagrat Mtsire was granted the duchy of Shorapani as an appanage, a frontier region between Imereti and eastern Georgia.

=== First war of independence ===
In 1372, Alexander, son of the last king Bagrat, inherited the Duchy of Shorapani. He rapidly emerged as one of the most powerful regional nobles and retained this status until the outbreak of the catastrophic events at the end of the century. In 1386, the Muslim armies of Timur invaded northern Georgia, devastating the country, capturing Tbilisi in November, and forcing King Bagrat V to convert to Islam, while the royal court took refuge in Imereti. Timur entrusted Bagrat V with a large Mongol army to subjugate the more remote regions of the kingdom, including the Duchy of Shorapani. When the Georgian king betrayed his suzerain and massacred this force, Timur was compelled to invade Georgia once again.

Alexander of Shorapani exploited the chaos in eastern Georgia to proclaim himself king of western Georgia and declared secession in 1387. He was crowned as Alexander I at the Gelati Monastery. This proclamation immediately proved contentious. The city of Kutaisi remained in the hands of loyalists to Bagrat V, while the duchies of Mingrelia, Svaneti, Abkhazia, and Guria refused to recognize the sovereignty of the new monarch. A civil war ensued, forcing Alexander I to seize several fortresses across Imereti by force, before his death in 1389.

George I succeeded his brother’s claims and was in turn crowned king, continuing the civil war and managing to capture several additional fortresses. In 1390, he succeeded in installing his protégé Arsen as Catholicos of Abkhazia, the highest religious authority in western Georgia, thereby initiating a religious schism within the Georgian Orthodox community between east and west.

This success was short-lived. In 1392, George I was killed during a military campaign aimed at subduing Vameq Dadiani, Duke of Mingrelia. With no designated successor, the crown of western Georgia once again fell into disorder. This situation enabled King George VII of Georgia to ally with the major western feudal lords and invade the rebellious territories. After a brief existence of five years, the Kingdom of western Georgia was once again annexed by Tbilisi, while the surviving members of the rebel family fled into the mountains of North Caucasus.

=== Second war of independence ===
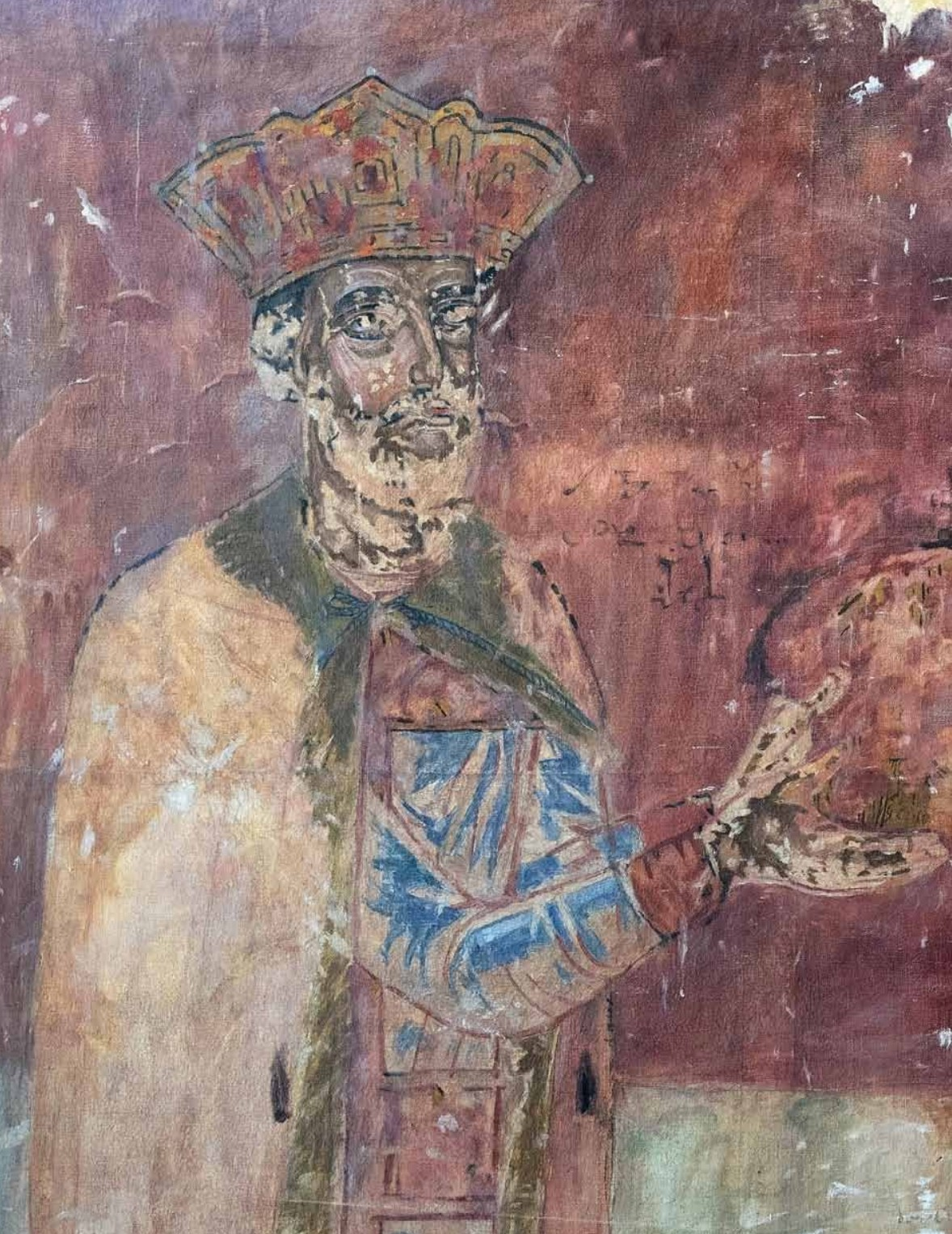
Alexander I of Georgia gave Prince Demetrius the Duchy of Samokalako after marrying his sister.

For four years, the western province of Imereti was reintegrated into the domains of the crown of Tbilisi, leading to the large-scale mobilization of Imeretians in the wars waged by George VII of Georgia against Timur. As the region had been depopulated, its citadels deprived of effective military defenses, and the Duke of Mingrelia died in 1396, Constantine took advantage of the situation to organize a new revolt against the central government. Constantine was the younger brother of the claimants Alexander I and George I and had gone into exile in Ossetia after the conquest of 1392.

Encountering little resistance, the new rebel seized numerous fortresses and had himself crowned as Constantine II, but failed to secure the support of the major feudal lords of the region. After demanding the vassalage of the dukes of Svaneti, Mingrelia, and Guria, he entered into war against Mamia II of Mingrelia, but was killed at the Battle of Chaliani in 1401. His nephew, Demetrius, became the heir to the rebel crown, but his young age prevented him from resisting George VII of Georgia, who took advantage of a temporary ceasefire with Timur to invade western Georgia and once again put an end to the separatist kingdom.

Seeking to unite the eastern and western branches of the royal Bagrationi dynasty, Alexander I of Georgia married Demetrius’s sister, Tamar, in 1415, while Demetrius himself was granted extensive lands in western Georgia, which became the Duchy of Samokalako. (Note: Contemporary sources mention a Duchy of Samokalako (‘urban duchy’), which modern historians interpret as a duchy of Kutaisi or Imereti.) Formerly the heir of the western rebels, Demetrius thus became a close ally of the central government and gave his daughter in marriage to the Georgian co-king Demetrius III, who reigned alongside his father and brothers from 1433 to 1446. At the outbreak of the civil war between George VIII of Georgia and Demetrius III, the latter used the regional power of his father-in-law to take control of western Georgia, without formally seceding from Tbilisi, before his death in 1453.

== Aftermath ==
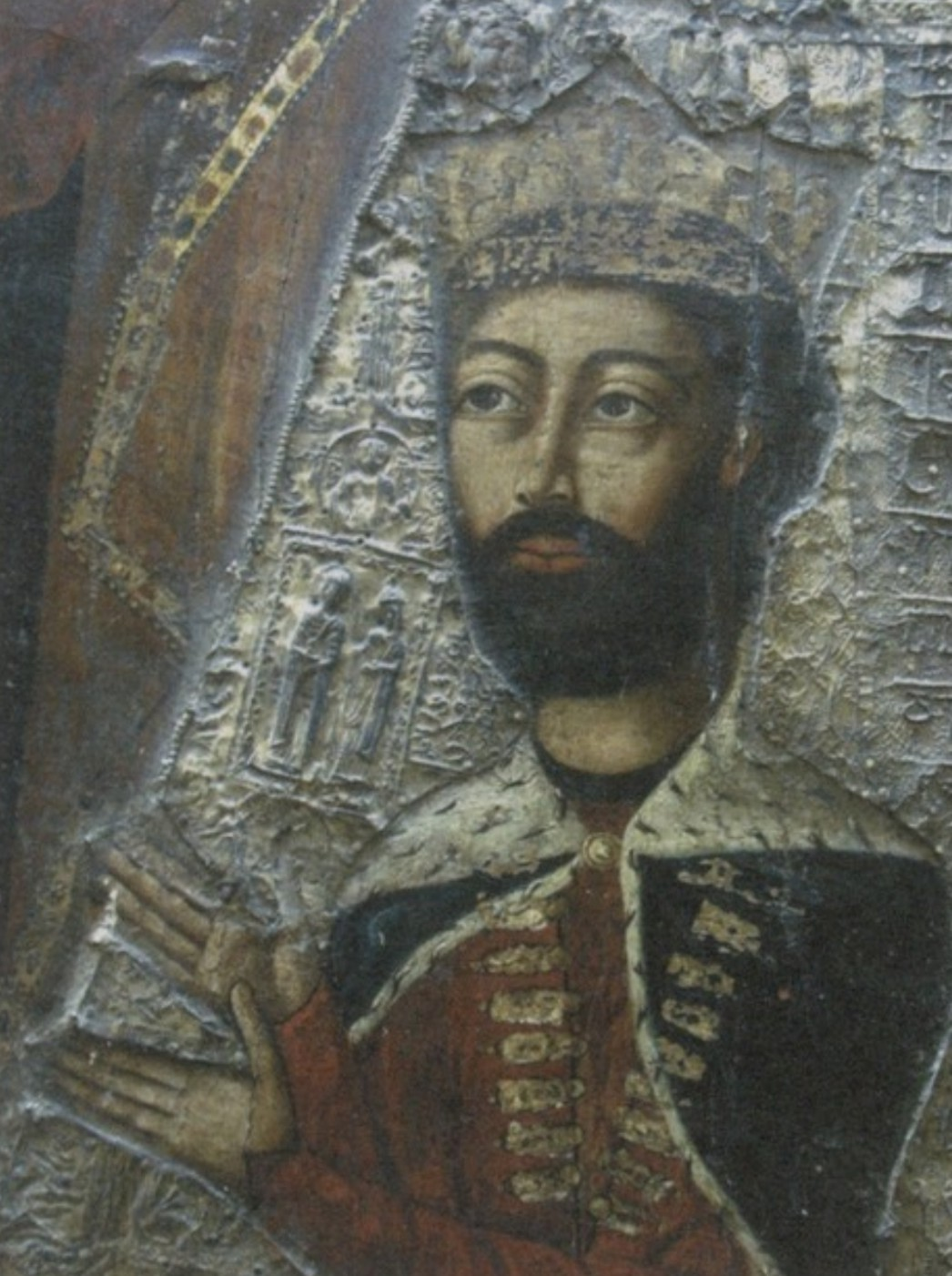
Bagrat, maternal grandson of Demetrius of Samokalako, succeeded Demetrius as Duke of Samokalako. After the Battle of Chikhori, he founded the Kingdom of Imereti and in 1466 was crowned king of the Kingdom of Georgia, following the capture of King George VIII by Qvarqvare II Jaqeli.

In 1455, Prince Bagrat, the maternal grandson of Duke Demetrius of Imereti, inherited the duchy and initially remained a loyal vassal of the Georgian crown. In the early 1460s, however, he allied himself with the Georgian prince Qvarqvare II of Samtskhe—who was continuing his dynastic struggle against the central government—and with the Iranian ruler Uzun Hasan, both acting against the Kingdom of Georgia. The conflict culminated in August 1463 at the Battle of Chikhori, where the forces loyal to King George VIII of Georgia were defeated by the army of Bagrat of Imereti. Following this victory, Bagrat seized Kutaisi and had himself crowned king of Imereti, restoring a western Georgian separatist kingdom for the fourth time.

As a reward for their political and military support, Bagrat recognized the rulers of Mingrelia, Abkhazia, Svaneti, and Guria as princes, elevating their status within the Georgian political hierarchy. This alliance enabled him to raise a substantial army, which invaded the eastern province of Kartli and captured Tbilisi in 1466. There, Bagrat was crowned again—this time as king of a reunified Georgia under the name Bagrat VI—by the Catholicos of Georgia, reportedly in exchange for bribes. This fragile reunification quickly collapsed into chaos when the deposed George VIII was liberated by Qvarqvare II, George took control of the eastern region of Kakheti, and proclaimed its independence, while Prince Constantine, son of Demetrius III, rebelled and seized northern Georgia. The resulting triumvirate of Georgian kings plunged the country into a prolonged civil war that lasted until the end of the century.

A temporary settlement was reached in 1468, when Bagrat VI and Constantine came to an agreement over Kartli. Rather than restoring unity, however, this arrangement deepened the fragmentation of the kingdom. From the early 1470s, Bagrat recognized Constantine as his successor in Kartli, while designating his eldest son, Alexander, as heir to Imereti. He further entrenched division by appointing a separate patriarch for western Georgia, thereby splitting the Catholicosate of Georgia, a move that was promptly recognized by the Patriarchate of Antioch.

During the 1470s, Imereti endured repeated Turcoman incursions, although Kartli suffered even greater devastation, with Tbilisi being sacked several times. Amid internal disorder and growing external isolation, Bagrat VI died in 1478, leaving the Imeretian throne to his son Alexander, who became Alexander II. Alexander, however, failed to secure universal recognition as ruler of Imereti and faced renewed unification efforts by Constantine II of Georgia. Constantine invaded Imereti and captured Kutaisi, forcing Alexander to flee into the mountains of Lechkhumi.

In 1483, Alexander II took advantage of a war between Constantine and the Samtskhe-Saatabago to recover Imereti. He was crowned once more at the Gelati Monastery as king of Imereti. The independence of Imereti was ultimately recognized by Constantine II in 1490, confirming the permanent fragmentation of the Kingdom of Georgia into separate kingdoms and principalities.

== Foreign relations ==
=== Western Georgia and Muslim powers ===
Despite the long-standing hostility between the Muslim states of the Middle East and Georgia, David VI “Narin” maintained relations with several Muslim neighbors in Anatolia, primarily in order to build alliances against the Ilkhanid Empire of Persia. In this context, Western Georgia allied itself with the Sultanate of Rum, one of the last Seljuk states still in existence in the 13th century. Himself the son of a Seljuk prince, (Note: David VI was the son of Prince Ghias ad-din, but kept his mother's dynastic name in order to inherit the throne.) King David gave his sister, Tamar, in marriage first to Sultan Kaykhusraw II, and, after the latter’s death, to the regent Pervâne. However, the fall of the sultanate in 1307 and the ensuing chaos among the Seljuk principalities prevented the development of close and sustained cooperation between the two states.

In 1264, Western Georgia sent an embassy to Baybars, the Mamluk sultan of Egypt, whose reign was largely devoted to fighting the Mongols. A second embassy was dispatched to Cairo in 1268, but no concrete outcome of these diplomatic missions is known. It is noteworthy that while Western Georgia was communicating with Cairo, the Kingdom of Eastern Georgia was allied with the Mongols and participated in their campaigns against the Mamluks. The outbreak of civil war within Western Georgia and its subsequent reintegration under the hegemony of Tbilisi in the early 14th century ultimately prevented the development of further relations with Muslim empires.

=== Relations with the Byzantine Empire ===
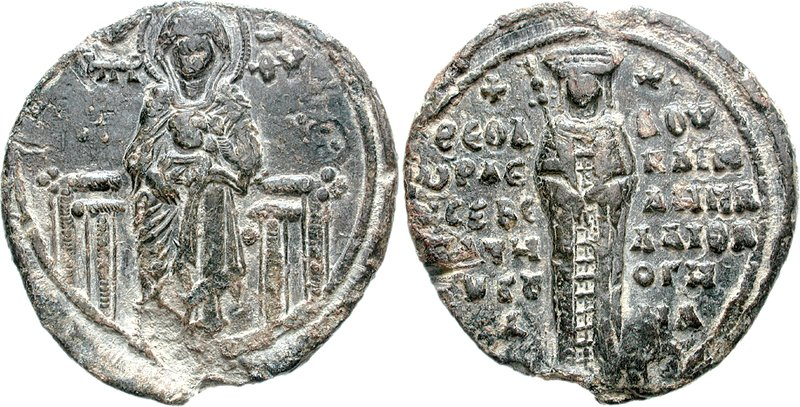
Coin representing Theodora Palaeologus, Queen of Western Georgia.

At the time of the foundation of the Kingdom of Western Georgia, the Byzantine Empire was emerging from half a century of upheaval following the capture of Constantinople by Crusader forces in 1204. After restoring Orthodox authority over parts of the Near East, the Byzantine Empire sought to secure allies among the Georgians. Following his accession to power, David VI married a Byzantine princess from the Palaiologos dynasty.

Friendly relations between the two states, however, went no further. After the death of David VI, no additional dynastic alliances were concluded between Kutaisi and Constantinople, while the princes of Eastern Georgia continued to cultivate ties with Byzantium. Instead, the government in Kutaisi turned toward the Empire of Trebizond. In the 1280s, Emperor John II of Trebizond took advantage of the Georgian division to free himself from the suzerainty of his northern neighbor and sought a direct alliance with Constantinople, which he visited in 1282. In an effort to reassert his authority, David VI invaded the empire in April 1282, occupying numerous provinces and laying siege to the capital itself. Although the Georgian forces were ultimately defeated, Kutaisi succeeded in annexing the eastern part of the empire.

In 1284, Western Georgia financed and supported a coup d’état led by Theodora, daughter of Manuel I of Trebizond and possibly a niece of David VI. She became empress for several months before losing the ensuing civil war and taking refuge in Georgia. According to the historian Michael Kuršankis, the coup was intended to establish a pro-Georgian and anti-Mongol government, a project supported by part of the local nobility. Relations between the two states soon collapsed, and Trebizond thereafter continued to align itself with the Georgian kingdom based in Tbilisi. (Note: The relationship between Georgia and Trebizond remained very friendly until the final days of the empire. John IV, the penultimate emperor, had married a daughter of Alexander I of Georgia.)

== Religion ==
Georgia has been an Orthodox nation since the 4th century, and since the reign of David IV of Georgia (1089–1125), the Catholicosate of Georgia has played a major role in the political development of the kingdom. Understanding the negative relationship between his recognition as a Western ruler and the unity of the Georgian Orthodox Church, David VI managed to create the Catholicate of Abkhazia, based at the Gelati Monastery, with its own patriarch around 1290. Some names of Western patriarchs are preserved, such as Nicholas when the kingdom was first proclaimed, and Arsenius and Daniel during the restoration of Western independence in the 1390s.

In the 1460s, Bagrat II succeeded in convincing the Patriarch of Antioch Michael IV to draft a special declaration recognizing the unique identity and origins of Christianity in western Georgia. This document formed a legal foundation for the recreation of the Catholicosate of Abkhazia, which was then recognized throughout the Orthodox world.

The constant wars plaguing western Georgia prevented the construction of many new churches. However, certain establishments were founded, notably in the autonomous principalities of the country. Thus, the Shemokmedi Monastery was created between the end of the 13th and the beginning of the 14th century by the princes of Guria; the church of Lykhny Church and the Bedia Cathedral were restored by the Georgian nobles of Abkhazia in the 13th and 14th centuries. It is possible that the Skhalta Cathedral, in Adjara, dates from the time of David VI.

King Constantine I built the monastery of Atchi in Guria. He also embarked on a program of religious revival and succeeded in reestablishing his kingdom's control over the Monastery of the Cross, a Georgian establishment in Jerusalem transformed into a mosque by the Muslim occupiers of the region, while he is probably at the origin of the construction of the church of Ienachi in Svanetia. Under his reign, Constantine the Great, a former Roman emperor canonized and honored by Orthodox churches, became a patron saint of western Georgia.

Georgian literature entered into decline, after Georgian Golden Age at the beginning of the 13th century. Despite this, Byzantine culture largely influenced the religious writings of independent Western Georgia, a fact widely acknowledged in the Mokvi Gospels, a medieval transcription made in Mokvi Cathedral by Georgian monks writing in Nuskhuri (the medieval Georgian alphabet used in the religious context) and trained in Byzantium. In the 14th century, the Mingrelian authorities sent an embassy to Constantinople to bring back Greek artists to repaint the Tsalenjikha Cathedral.

== Bibliography ==
- Brosset, Marie-Félicité (1849). Histoire de la Géorgie, depuis l'Antiquité jusqu'au XIXe siècle - 1re partie. St. Petersburg: Saint Petersburg Academy of Sciences.
- Brosset, Marie-Félicité (1856). Histoire de la Géorgie depuis l'Antiquité jusqu'au XIXe siècle - IIe partie: Histoire moderne. Saint Petersburg Academy of Sciences.
- Finlay, George (1851). The History of Greece and Empire of Trebizond (1204-1461). Edinburgh: William Blackwood.
- Lane, George (1999). "Arghun Aqa: Mongol Bureaucrat". Iranian Studies. 32 (4). Cambridge University Press: 459–482. doi:10.1080/00210869908701965. JSTOR 4311297.
- Rayfield, Donald (2012). Edge of Empires, a History of Georgia. London: Reaktion Books. ISBN 978-1-78023-070-2.
- de Montpéreux, Frédéric Dubois (1999) Voyage autour du Caucase, chez les Tcherkesses et les Abkhazes, en Colchide, en Géorgie, en Arménie et en Crimée, Volume 1, Soukhoumi:Adegi Graphics, ISBN 1-4212-4702-X
- Salia, Kalistrat (1980). Histoire de la nation géorgienne. Paris: Édition Nino Salia.
- Gamkrelidze, Guela (2013). Ქართლის ცხოვრების ტოპოარქეოლოგიური ლექსიკონი (Dictionnaire topoarchéologique des Chroniques géorgiennes) (PDF) (in Georgian). Tbilissi: Musée national géorgien. ISBN 978-9941-15-896-4.
- Guelenava, Irakli (2015). Cultural Heritage in Abkhazia (PDF) (in Georgian and English). Tbilissi: Meridiani.
