= War of succession =

Conflict prompted by individuals claiming rightful leadership of a monarchy

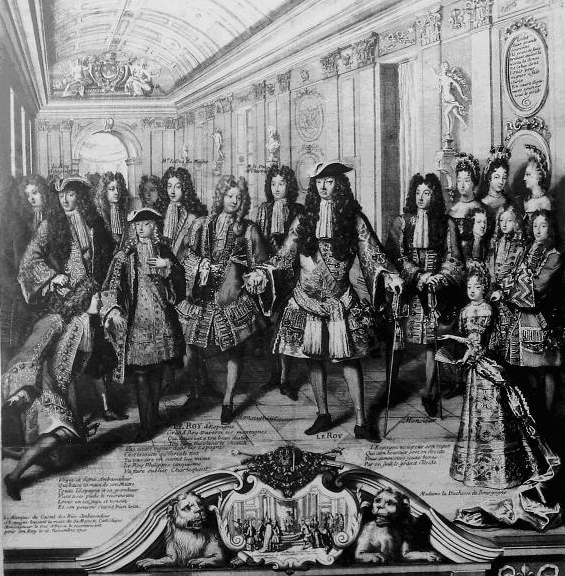
After the death of Charles II of Spain, Louis XIV of France proclaims his grandson Philippe d'Anjou the new Spanish monarch (November 1700), triggering the War of the Spanish Succession (1701–1714)

A war of succession is prompted by a succession crisis in which two or more individuals claim to be the rightful successor to a deceased or deposed monarch. The rivals are typically supported by factions within the royal court. Foreign powers sometimes intervene, allying themselves with a faction. This may widen the war into one between those powers.

Wars of succession were some of the most prevalent types of wars by cause throughout human history, but the replacement of absolute monarchies by an international order based on democracy with constitutional monarchies or republics ended almost all such wars by 1900.

== Terminology ==
=== Descriptions ===
In historiography and literature, a war of succession may also be referred to as a succession dispute, dynastic struggle, internecine conflict, fratricidal war, or any combination of these terms. Not all of these are necessarily describing armed conflict, however, and the dispute may be resolved without escalating into open warfare. Wars of succession are also often referred to as a civil war, when in fact it was a conflict within the royalty, or broader aristocracy, that civilians were dragged into. It depends on the circumstances whether a war of succession is also a civil war in the sense of intrastate war (if it is limited to armed conflict inside one state), or it may be an interstate war (if foreign powers intervene; sometimes called 'international' war), or both. Therefore, names or descriptions of a war may simply depend on one's perspective; for example, Nolan (2008) stated: 'The Williamite War of 1689–1691, sometimes known as the Jacobite War, was a war of succession in England and an international war for or against France for most non-Irish participants. But it was a civil war in Ireland.' Similarly, scholars sometimes disagree whether the 1657–1661 Mughal dynastic conflict (which consisted of several subconflicts, phases, and factions) should be labelled a 'war of succession' or a '(princely) rebellion'. (Note: Faruqui (2012) decided 'not to count the conflict between Aurangzeb and his brothers (1657–9) as a rebellion. This is an arguable choice since the conflict started out as a rebellion against Shah Jahan but then morphed into a succession struggle once Shah Jahan had been forced to abdicate his throne in the summer of 1658.' He regarded it as a 'war of succession' and noted that S. M. Azizuddin Husain (2002) had characterised it as a 'rebellion'.)

=== Orders of succession ===
There are several different types of orders of succession, some of which may not have been enshrined in law, but only established in local custom or tradition. Across times and places, orders of succession have switched from one system to another. Some prominent examples are:

- None: Every death of a monarch results in a succession crisis that is resolved ad hoc, either diplomatically or by violence. This pattern has been observed in cultures around the world, for example in the Buyid dynasty (934–1062), Đại Cồ Việt (968–1054), Ayutthaya (17th century), and Mataram (17th–18th century).
- Heir designation or selection: The reigning monarch had the sole right to personally designate his or her preferred heir while still alive, sometimes far ahead of time (perhaps already giving them important functions and dignities), sometimes only in their last will or verbally on their deathbed. This pattern has been observed in cultures around the world. For example, from Peter the Great (1721) to the Pauline Laws (1797), the Russian Empire had this system. It was also common in high medieval Mediterranean Europe to accept heir designation by will.
  - Co-rulership or abdication/delegation: In many states in cultures around the world, the reigning monarch gave their designated heir already a prominent role in running the realm to prevent a power vacuum upon the monarch's death, and to train the co-ruler in their future duties. The Roman Tetrarchy had two Augusti (senior emperors) and two Caesari (junior emperors, chosen by the Augusti). The Capetian kings France had their sons elected 'co-king' by his noblemen to ensure loyalty to the heir. The Han dynasty set up an Office of the Crown Prince wherein a group of officials trained and served the heir designate long ahead of the succession. In the Vietnamese Trần dynasty, the kings '[abdicated] the throne to their chosen adult heirs upon the death of their predecessors, thereafter ruling as 'senior' kings.'
- Equal share within the lineage or dividing the inheritance: One son of the monarch would inherit the kingship while other sons (or other male relatives) would be given an equal share / regional control of the territory. This was common practice in Francia, and prevailed in certain regions in northern and western France such as Normandy long after the French royal dynasty had adopted primogeniture.
- Agnatic seniority, collateral succession, horizontal succession, fraternal succession or brother–brother succession: When monarch X dies, his oldest brother succeeds him, and then his second-oldest brother and so on, until there are no brothers left; then, the oldest son of monarch X becomes the next monarch, and then monarch X's second-oldest son, and so on. This pattern has been observed in cultures around the world, including in many European states before the 11th century such as Piast dynasty of Poland, and the Rurik dynasty of the Kievan Rus' and its successor states), African states such as the Kanem–Bornu Empire from the 14th century onwards, or Asian states such as the Konbaung dynasty of Burma. (Note: Although collateral succession was founder Alaungpaya's intention, it would always be challenged by patrilineal succession throughout the Konbaung dynasty's existence, and almost every succession resulted in bloodshed, including assassinations, coups d'état, princely rebellions, and one war of succession in 1760–1762.)
- Patrilineal succession, vertical succession, filial succession or father–son succession: A son of the previous monarch succeeds him. There are several different subtypes of this order of succession, including:
  - Primogeniture: The oldest son of the previous monarch succeeds him; in case there is no son, then his eldest daughter succeeds. This system is virtually unique to Europe, and has only been adopted in very few other states in modern times.
    - Salic law: Only males can inherit the kingship.
    - semi-Salic law: Inheritance may pass through the female line but only at the extinction of all male lines.
    - Absolute primogeniture, gender is irrelevant and the oldest child of the last monarch automatically becomes the next ruler.
  - Ultimogeniture: The youngest son of the previous monarch succeeds him. This system existed in some places in medieval Europe.
  - Non-fixed son: There is no fixed rule which son of the previous monarch should automatically succeed him. Any son may be designated as heir by the living monarch, or be accepted by the relevant aristocrats after asserting himself through diplomacy or violence over his brothers. Examples include the Kanem–Bornu Empire until the 14th century, and Anglo-Saxon England.
- Elective succession: see elective monarchy. The royal succession is decided by votes from a relatively small group of aristocrats (typically a few dozen). It may be decided by an election vivente rege ("while the king yet lives") to secure a more stable transition of power upon the monarch's death, although this was not required, and could still result in a war of succession.

== Analysis ==
=== Common elements ===
A war of succession is a type of war concerning struggle for the throne: a conflict about supreme power in a monarchy. Although it is typically associated with hereditary monarchy (either with primogeniture or some other principle of hereditary succession), the concept has also been applied to elective monarchies. It may be intrastate war, an interstate war (if foreign powers intervene), or both.

A succession war may arise after (or sometimes even before) a universally recognised ruler over a certain territory passes away (sometimes without leaving behind any (legal) offspring, or failing to clearly designate an heir), or is declared insane or otherwise incapable to govern, and is deposed. Next, several pretenders (also known as 'claimants', 'candidates', or 'rivals') step forward, who are either related to the previous ruler (by ancestry or marriage) and therefore claim to have a right to their possessions based on the hereditary principle, or have concluded a treaty to that effect. They will seek allies within the nobility and/or abroad to support their claims to the throne. After all options for a diplomatic solution –such as a sharing of power, or a financial deal– or a quick elimination (in effect a coup d'état) –e.g. by assassination or arrest– have been exhausted, a military confrontation will follow. Quite often such succession disputes have led to long-lasting wars. Potential candidates were not always limited to members from the royal household; depending on circumstances, aristocrats of other noble families within the realm were eligible to replace the deceased monarch, and could seize the opportunity of a succession crisis to take control of the state and found a new dynasty.

Factors that increased the risk of a succession crisis included lack of legitimate heirs (especially when the (ruling branch of a) dynasty died out), illegitimate children, contested inheritance, and the creation of collateral dynastic branches. The last factor in particular had the potential to not only stimulate wars of succession upon a monarch's death, but also princely revolts by cadets and cousins while they were still alive. The minority of a ruler necessitated regents and ministers to run state affairs until they came of age, which made opposition from military and administrative elites to the underage monarch easier, and also increased the risk of widespread political instability and civil conflict.

Some wars of succession are about women's right to inherit. This does not exist in some countries (a "sword fief", where the Salic law applies, for example), but it does in others (a "spindle fief"). Often a ruler who has no sons, but does have one or more daughters, will try to change the succession laws so that a daughter can succeed him. Such amendments will then be declared invalid by opponents, invoking the local tradition. In Europe, the Holy Roman Emperor (or King of the Romans) increasingly regularly granted smaller inland fiefs to heirs according to the female lineage since the 13th century. The Privilegium Minus of 1156, which established the Duchy of Austria, already allowed women to inherit the state as well. (Note: "[I, Emperor Frederick, decree] by a perpetual law that [Henry and Theodora] and their children alike, whether sons or daughters, shall, by hereditary right, hold and possess the aforementioned Duchy of Austria from the Empire.")

=== Prevalence and impact ===
Land inheritance disputes were frequent in agrarian societies, and the 'increasing subdivision of estates was a common cause of the undermining of territorial aristocracies' in cultures across the world. For example, in the 10th and 11th centuries, Sassanid Persia, various states in India, the Song dynasty of China, and medieval Europe, all struggled with succession crises. According to British statesman Henry Brougham (Lord Chancellor 1830–34), there were more and longer wars of succession in Europe between 1066 and the French Revolution (1789–99) than all other wars put together. "A war of succession is the most lasting of wars. The hereditary principle keeps it in perpetual life – [whereas] a war of election is always short, and never revives", he opined, arguing for elective monarchy to solve the problem. According to Kalevi Holsti (1991, p. 308, Table 12.2), who catalogued and categorised wars from 1648 to 1989 into 24 categories of 'issues that generated wars', 'dynastic/succession claims' were (one of) the primary cause(s) of 14% of all wars during 1648–1714, 9% during 1715–1814, 3% during 1815–1914, and 0% during 1918–1941 and 1945–1989. Braumoeller (2019) attributed this drastic decrease (and practical extinction) of wars of succession from the 18th century onwards largely to the fact that 'succession no longer serves either to cement territorial holdings legitimized by continuous bloodlines or to create de facto alliances or long-standing allegiances among the Great Powers.' He added that 'an international order based on political democracy more or less eliminates the incentive for wars of royal succession.'

Wars of succession have throughout history often been the worst-case scenario for absolute monarchies and other autocracies, as they are commonly known to be at their weakest and most vulnerable when the ruler dies and it is uncertain who will be the successor. Rival claims to ultimate power within such a regime are very prone to spiralling out of control into violence, because such regimes operate according to rule by force, or might makes right. A succession crisis not only risks dragging the entire population into 'civil' war between factions backing rival pretenders, but the power vacuum it creates also presents oppressed groups within the state with an opportunity to revolt, as well as vassal states outside it to reclaim their independence, and while the state is weakened, it also provides rulers of neighbouring states the chance to invade to further their own interests (with or without their own claim to the throne, or while backing another claimant within the state). In numerous cases, the enormous long-term political and economic instability created by wars of succession caused the fall of the dynasty or the state, or both.

Scholars such as Johannes Kunisch and Johannes Burckhardt (1997) blamed wars of succession in early modern Europe on notions such as the divine right of kings and absolutism, because they created inherent problems in 'a state system that had known neither effective forms of cooperation nor a clear hierarchy that had neither experienced a formal equality between its members nor clear borders.' Nolan (2008) added about the 1650–1715 period in Europe: 'Complex issues of succession of Bourbon and Habsburg were the daily stuff of high European politics at all times, and the bane of the lives of the masses of peasants swept away by ebbing and waning tides of peace and the maelstrom of war.' To him, the Nine Years' War and (1688–1697) and War of the Spanish Succession (1701–1714) were the 'two great, climactic conflicts that submerged local conflicts', so that these decades produced 'a generation of war that swirled around the dynastic ambitions and personal convictions of Louis XIV.'

=== Prevention and mitigation ===
"The most plausible plea which hath ever been offered in favor of hereditary succession is, that it preserves a nation from civil wars; and were this true, it would be weighty; whereas it is the most bare-faced falsity ever imposed on mankind."

— Thomas Paine, Common Sense (1776)

Throughout the centuries and across the planet, various attempts have been made at prevention or mitigation of wars of succession.

- Legally fixing the order of succession (see also Orders of succession above): All over Europe (except in the Kievan Rus'), the introduction of primogeniture from the 11th to 13th century sought to establish a fixed order of succession, but it proved to be insufficient to prevent numerous succession crises and wars, as demonstrated by their persistence into the 19th century. Kokkonen and Sundell (2017) found that in Europe during 1000–1799, successions following monarchs' natural deaths considerably increased the risk of both intrastate ('civil') as well as interstate wars of succession; they calculated that monarchies practicing primogeniture did experience fewer intrastate wars than elective monarchies, but 'there is no evidence that primogeniture moderated successions' effects on interstate wars.' Luard (1992) and Duchchardt (1997) pointed out that additional diplomatic efforts such as 'offensive and defensive alliances, dynastic marriages and agreements on succession' often failed to prevent them either, although Nolan (2008) countered that the Act of Settlement 1701 (alias Act of Succession) did avoid 'another violent succession crisis upon Queen Anne's eventual death.' Modern scholars are still divided on the question whether hereditary succession (as opposed to other methods of appointing leaders) has historically been a net force for political stability, including Kokkonen and Sundell (2014), or instability, such as Steven Pinker (2011), who stated: 'The idea of basing leadership on inheritance is a recipe for endless wars of succession'. Some thinkers of the latter opinion go as far back as Thomas Paine in his pamphlet Common Sense (1776), in which his argument in favour of the American colonies in revolt against the British crown becoming a republic rather than a monarchy included his claim that hereditary succession more often than not led to civil wars.
- Dividing the inheritance: A common strategy in states such as Francia and the Timurid Empire was to share the inheritance amongst male family members by giving them regional control over the realm's territory in order to appease them. One would still be the supreme ruler, while the other heirs would receive appanages and could establish cadet branches. Any landholdings and titles of princely branches that died out could be retaken by the dynasty's ruling branch. However, this division of the inheritance also granted many princes a power base from which to challenge the reigning monarch.
- Abdication/delegation in favour of designated heir: Abdication of a living monarch in favour of one or more heirs was one strategy to attempt to secure a smooth transition of power. For example, Charles V, Holy Roman Emperor abdicated in 1556 and divided his possessions between his son Philip II of Spain and his brother Ferdinand I, Holy Roman Emperor before dying in 1558, splitting the House of Habsburg in a Spanish and an Austrian branch. A related strategy was a partial or gradual abdication in which the ruling monarch already delegated some of their powers to their designated heir before retiring from active politics or dying. An example is how Cosimo I de' Medici effectively retired from governing in the 1560s in favour of his son and designated successor Francesco before dying in 1574.
- Eliminating potential opponents beforehand: A common set of strategies to secure one's own succession or accession or that of someone else before a war could break out was to eliminate potential rivals early on in the succession crisis, or before there even was a succession crisis. This could range from assassination to banishment, and from bodily mutilation to imprisonment. Political mutilation in Byzantine culture was one way in which rivals sought to prevent each other from staging coups d'état or wars of succession to gain the Byzantine Emperorship, either before they had the chance, or to punish them after failed attempts and to prevent future attempts. Similar mutilation of competitors for succession were also common elsewhere in Europe, such as William fitz Giroie in 11th-century Normandy. In the Ottoman Empire, succession practices against potential rival claimants ranged from committing royal fratricide to lifelong imprisonment in the Kafes. None of its succession procedures were codified, however.
- Hiding the monarch's death and secretly seizing power: An ad hoc strategy that a candidate or an important player supporting a candidate might have is to try and hide the monarch's death for some time to undertake the necessary actions to secretly seize power and confront any potential rival pretenders with a fait accompli. This can only be done effectively if one can control the flow of information about the monarch's death from potential rivals. Even if a war erupts, whoever seizes control over critical government institutions (such as the court and the army) first, and secures the support of domestic and foreign powers at the start, puts their enemy/enemies at a major disadvantage.

=== Applicability ===
It can sometimes be difficult to determine whether a war was purely or primarily a war of succession, or that other interests were at play as well that shaped the conflict in an equally or more important manner, such territory, economy, religion, and so on. Many wars are not called 'war of succession' because hereditary succession was not the most important element, or despite the fact that it (partially) was. For example, the Great Northern War (1700–1721) was primarily about territory, but during 1704–1706, it was focused on the royal succession in Poland. Similarly, wars can also be unjustly branded a 'war of succession' whilst the succession was actually not the most important issue hanging in the balance, such as when Louis XIV used dubious succession claims as an excuse to declare the War of Devolution (1667–1668) that he rather sought to fight for territorial gain. Some wars of succession were about multiple simultaneous disputes, such as in the cases of the Nine Years' War (about England, the Palatinate, and Cologne) and the War of the Polish Succession (about Poland and Lorraine). The outbreak of a war can be motivated by a succession dispute, but its focus or scope can shift over its course, and vice versa, particularly if a new succession crisis erupts in the middle of a war that originally began for different reasons (e.g. the Russo-Swedish War (1741–1743)).

== Patterns by continent ==
=== African patterns ===
"There was a general rush for arms; fighting began at once and continued until one of the rivals was killed, when all his followers submitted to the victor and became his men. It seldom happened that more than two princes fought for the throne, the others would look on and accept the result of the combat. Sometimes, however, several would claim it, and whatever the number of rivals might be, the fighting would not end until only one of them was left alive."

— John Roscoe (1923) describing wars of succession amongst the Banyoro people in the Empire of Kitara

According to Catherine Coquery-Vidrovitch (1988), wars of succession were "so common in the history of African monarchies that it seems almost an institution". Especially in matrilinear societies, there were few succession laws or fixed customs. "Dynastic histories are everywhere intersected with wars of succession (the almost exclusive cause of civil wars) and royal genealogies are very hard to reconstruct", with many "unfortunate heirs-presumptive more or less violently prevented from assuming office".

==== Changing orders of succession ====
In various African cultures, the order of succession has changed over the course of centuries from one type to another, and especially during a switch, there were several wars of succession before the new system was consolidated. For example, the death of mai Idris I Nigalemi (c. 1370) of the Kanem–Bornu Empire triggered a war of succession, because it was unclear whether collateral (brother to brother) or filial/patrilineal (father to son) succession was to be preferred; patrilineal had been dominant until early 14th-century Kanem–Bornu, but was replaced by collateral by 1400. The Kano Chronicle records father–son succession in the Kingdom of Kano, but always mentions the name of the ruler's mother, which may point to vestiges of a preceding matrilineal system. The Kingdom of Yatenga switched from collateral to filial succession in the late 18th century.

==== Bunyoro ====
Several Bunyoro wars of succession took place in the East African Empire of Kitara in the 17th and 18th century. The last recorded two occurred around 1851 and 1869. Every death of a mukama ("king") of Kitara created a power vacuum, during which all legitimate royal candidates were required to negotiate to agree on a single candidate to become the next ruler. In cases of failure, "traditions encouraged them to mobilize their supporters and engage in a brief and decisive political violence to win the vacant seat." Using such political violence was an institutionalised legitimate procedure to end the royal power vacuum, but sometimes the rivals did not manage to defeat each other quickly as custom demanded. Lengthy wars of succession often broke down society with large-scale famines, massacres and refugee crises, endangering the state's continued existence. They also almost always coincided with rebellions in tributary states, indicating that vassals regularly sought to exploit their suzerain's weakness during succession disputes in order to reclaim independence.

=== Americas patterns ===
In Andean civilizations such as the Inca Empire (1438–1533), it was customary for a lord to pass on his reign to the son he perceived to be the most able, not necessarily his oldest son; sometimes he chose a brother instead. After the Spanish colonization of the Americas began in 1492, some Andean lords began to assert their eldest-born sons were the only "legitimate" heirs (as was common to European primogeniture customs), while others maintained Andean succession customs involving the co-regency of a younger son of a sitting ruler during the latter's lifetime, each whenever the circumstances favoured either approach.

=== Asian patterns ===
==== Burma ====
Helen James (2004) stated that in the late 17th-century Burmese Restored Toungoo dynasty, "the transfer of power upon the death of a monarch was always a problem, for there were many contenders to the throne owing to the practice of polygamy. The sons of the major queens frequently contested the succession." Alaungpaya, founder of the new Konbaung dynasty (1752–1885), intended his successors to be appointed by agnatic seniority (from brother to brother), according to James in an attempt "to avoid the bloodshed that accompanied each transfer of power at the death of a Burmese monarch. It was a vain hope. The directive itself led to bloody succession crises, as some of his sons sought to pass the crown to their sons instead of their brothers, thereby thwarting Alaungpaya's dying wish." His oldest son Naungdawgyi had to fight a two-year war of succession (1760–1762) to assert his authority. Hsinbyushin's succession was not challenged, but designating his son Singu Min as heir rather than a younger brother bred an imminent succession dispute just before his death. The next king, Singu, managed to avoid a war of succession by having most of his potential rivals killed or exiled in a timely manner, although Singu's reign was cut short by a princely rebellion in February 1782, in which Phaungkaza Maung Maung seized the throne for seven days before Bodawpaya killed and replaced him. Bodawpaya successfully eliminated all his rivals upon enthronement, and in 1802 ended "twenty-five years of conflict between lineal and collateral succession" in favour of the former, according to Koenig (1990). Nevertheless, two kings were overthrown by their brothers in coups in 1837 and 1853, and in 1866, the crown prince (the king's brother) was assassinated by two of the king's sons. When the last Burmese king, Thibaw Min (r. 1878–1885), began his reign, he had about 80 of his relatives murdered to prevent any challenge to his accession.

==== China ====
According to Arthur Waldron (2008), "throughout their history, Chinese states have been overwhelmingly land-based and (...) their wars have chiefly been wars of succession and overland conquest." In the alleged first dynasty, the Xia, as well as the confirmed Shang dynasty, both father–son and older brother–younger brother succession appear to have existed, with agnatic primogeniture gradually becoming a frequent practice in the late Shang. The Rebellion of the Three Guards (c. 1042–1039 BCE) after the death of King Wu of Zhou is perhaps the first war of succession in Chinese recorded history. During the reign of Duke Zhuang, Zheng was the most powerful Spring and Autumn period state, but the 701–680 BCE war of succession following his death reduced it to one of the weakest. As the authority of the Zhou dynasty declined, the states' power increased (the Age of Hegemons), and whenever the Zhou royal clan was unable to solve a succession crisis by itself, leading states were expected to militarily intervene on behalf of the "legitimate" heir, which occurred frequently in the 7th and 6th centuries. However, as the states grew more powerful and dukes had to delegate control over certain areas to kinsmen as their territories enlarged, they increasingly risked internal dynastic struggles as well. The largest states in particular experienced this problem, namely Qi (e.g. the War of Qi's succession in 643–642 BCE) and Jin; in the latter case, this eventually led to the Partition of Jin in 403 BCE, which ushered in the Warring States period.

After uniting all states into his Qin dynasty, the first Chinese emperor, Qin Shi Huang, failed to establish secure succession rules before his death in 210 BCE, upon which his clan immediately lost control of the government to Li Si and Zhao Gao, and his dynasty fell soon after (207 BCE). Winning the subsequent Chu–Han Contention and founding the Han dynasty, Emperor Gaozu sought to ensure a stable succession process that would not endanger the dynasty. He strengthened the designated heir's position by creating the office of the Crown Prince, in which a group of officials educated and served the designated heir well in advance until his time to succeed would arrive. This crown prince system prevented a lot of succession disputes during the Han dynasty, and although it frequently malfunctioned in the Three Kingdoms, Jin and Northern and Southern dynasties periods, it "matured" during the Tang and Song dynasties. Nevertheless, the Han state did suffer dynastic instability several times. When a Han emperor died without officially appointing a successor, his widow, the empress dowager, had the sole right to appoint one of the late emperor's surviving sons or relatives to the position. At such times, or when an infant emperor was placed on the Han throne, a regent, often also the empress dowager or one of her male relatives, would assume the duties of the emperor until he reached his majority. Sometimes the empress dowager's faction—the consort clan—was overthrown in a coup d'état or a war of succession. For example, Empress Lü Zhi was the de facto ruler of the court during the reigns of the child emperors Qianshao (r. 188–184 BCE) and Houshao (r. 184–180 BCE), but her faction was overthrown during the Lü Clan Disturbance upon her death in 180 BCE, and Liu Heng was named emperor instead.

At the end of the Han dynasty in the 190s, the imperial Liu family lost effective control over the state; prominent members of the nobility became warlords trying to establish their own dynasties. Instead of governors being appointed by the emperor, they tried to secure the succession of their own clansmen, making it a hereditary office that led to several succession crises. The Yuan clan, once a prominent candidate to replace the imperial Liu family, descended into a fratricidal war upon Yuan Shao's death (202–205). The August 208 death of Liu Biao caused a succession dispute between his sons Liu Cong and Liu Qi, but a quick invasion by Cao Cao forced Cong to surrender without a fight while Qi fled. Cao Pi's deposition of the last Han emperor Xian and foundation of the Wei dynasty in 220 caused Liu Bei, a scion of the imperial family, to proclaim himself the legitimate emperor and found the Shu Han dynasty in 221, followed by Sun Quan's Eastern Wu in 229; this three-way claim to the imperial throne started the Three Kingdoms period. The death of Sun Quan's heir resulted in a succession struggle between Sun He and Sun Ba (241–250); Quan deposed He, forced Ba to commit suicide, and appointed 5-year-old Sun Liang as successor. Liang became emperor aged 7 in 252, but this boy-ruler was deposed in 258.

==== Japan ====
The Yamato state did not have clear rules on succession (such as primogeniture), and the death of a monarch frequently resulted in a crisis with multiple claimants from several powerful clans vying for the throne. The religion-based Soga–Mononobe conflict (552–587) between the pro-Shinto Mononobe clan and the pro-Buddhist Soga clan sometimes resulted in wars of succession, particularly in 585–587. To prevent further challenges to his power due to succession crises and to enforce the adoption of Buddhism, clan leader Soga no Umako had Emperor Sushun assassinated in 592, and instead installed Suiko as empress (the first woman on the imperial throne in Japanese history) with Prince Shōtoku as regent, while holding the reins of power behind the scenes. This configuration led to a stable reign of empress Suiko until 628, 'a remarkably long span for that period.' However, when she died and Shōtoku's son Prince Yamashiro claimed the throne, he was rejected by the Soga clan in favour of Emperor Jomei. After the latter died in 641 and was succeeded by his wife, Empress Kōgyoku, Yamashiro once again claimed the throne, but he and his family were killed (possibly by suicide) when soldiers of Soga no Iruka attacked. The latter was subsequently murdered in the 645 Isshi Incident by Prince Naka-no-Ōe, who installed puppet Emperor Kōtoku before taking the throne himself as Emperor Tenji in 654. Tenji's death in 672 caused the Jinshin War; as there were still no rules for succession, any close kin of the deceased emperor regardless of gender could claim equal rights to the crown.

==== Fitnas in early Islamic states ====
The historical Fitnas and similar conflicts in early Islam were essentially wars of succession, resulting not (primarily) from religious disputes, but from a lack of agreement in early Islamic political thought on how to politically organise the early Muslim community. In particular, there was no consensus on the exercise of power and how leaders should be appointed. This lack of constitutional theory has been attributed by Ali Abdel Raziq (1888–1966) to the idea that the prophet Muhammad had been primarily concerned with religious regulations, and had not given priority to founding a political system, never left a known successor (= caliph), nor established standard rules by which future leaders were to be appointed. After his death in 632, this compelled the Companions to find ad hoc solutions to the leadership question, causing succession disputes that resulted in the Fitnas, most notably the First Fitna (656–661), the Second Fitna (680–692), the Third Fitna (744–747), the Fourth Fitna (809–827), and the Fitna of al-Andalus (1009–1031). Eventually, the disputes led to the major schism between Sunni Muslims, who held that the leader should in some way be elected from within the Quraysh, and Shia Muslims, who held that the leader must be a direct biological descendant of Muhammad through Ali, and that each leader personally designated his own successor.

==== Islamic dynasties ====
Other wars of succession in later Islamic polities in Asia (mostly Perso-Arabic, Turkic, and Mongolic monarchies) that haven't been named fitnas have also occurred, such as during the Abbasid Caliphate, where a peaceful transition of power upon the caliph's death was the exception rather than the rule. According to Justin Marozzi (2015), the 775 succession of Al-Mansur by Al-Mahdi "was, by the standards of the future, blood-soaked successions of the Abbasid caliphate, a model of order and decorum." During the period of Abbasid fragmentation into autonomous dynasties (c. 850–1050), this was still a common problem according to Antony Black (2011): "Most dynasties were disabled by succession struggles; it was difficult to establish a constitutional rule for succession in the face of Islamic law and tribal custom, which divided a patrimony equally among all sons. (...) To gain the succession within a clan dynasty, you needed, once again, to demonstrate that God was on your side. This meant acquiring support through a combination of military success and good repute." Eric J. Hanne (2007) reached a similar conclusion about the Buyid dynasty in particular: "As the Buyids had traditionally divided up their lands among brothers, uncles, and cousins, the familial confederacy, a frail situation at best, only worked when one had a strong personal figure such as 'Adud al-Dawla (d. 372/983), whose suzerainty was accepted only after prolonged internecine warfare." Wars of succession could sometimes cause more instability to the realm than whatever stability the most capable of rulers could achieve in times of peace. Citing Ibn Khaldun, Black argued that this was one major factor why virtually all Islamic dynasties (with the notable exception of the Ottoman Empire) lasted only about 100 to 200 years before falling apart due to succession crises.

According to Rashid al-Din Hamadani's Jami' al-tawarikh (c. 1316), the Ilkhanate was plagued with succession struggles, misrule and corruption from its founding by Hulagu Khan in the 1260s until the accession of Ghazan in 1295, the first Ilkhan to convert to Islam, and to make efforts to base the Ilkhanate's legitimacy on that religion. However, because Ghazan was Rashid's patron, this account of the early Ilkhanate's instability may have been exaggerated in order to glorify Ghazan and legitimise his reign.

==== Indian subcontinent ====
In our quarter of the globe, the succession to the crown is settled in favour of the eldest by wise and fixed laws; but in Hindústan the right of governing is usually disputed by all the sons of the deceased monarch, each of whom is reduced to the cruel alternative of sacrificing his brothers that he himself may reign, or of suffering his own life to be forfeited for the security and stability of the dominion of another.

— François Bernier, Travels in the Mughal Empire (1670)

In the Mughal Empire (1526–1857), there was no tradition of primogeniture. Instead it was customary for sons to overthrow their father, and for brothers to war to the death among themselves (takht ya takhta). 17th-century French traveller François Bernier, who spent about 12 years in India (1658–1670; partially overlapping with the Mughal war of succession of 1657–1661), praised Aurangzeb as "a great King" with "a versatile and rare genius", but was critical of the "unjust and cruel" means by which he and other Mughal emperors rose to power through war rather than the European method of succession "in favour of the eldest son by wise and fixed laws" that Bernier himself was familiar with. Judith E. Walsh (2006) stated that wars of succession were "the one problem the Mughals never solved", and that after Aurangzeb's death in 1707, repetitive "succession struggles brought Mughal power more or less to an end" On the other hand, scholars such as Faruqui (2002) have posited that studies which argue Mughal succession struggles weakened the empire may be influenced by "a long held bias in Western European writings favoring the institution of primogeniture over all other modes of forms of succession." Instead, Faruqui sought to "demonstrate how, far from weakening the empire, intra-dynastic collaboration and strife was a crucial site for the production and reproduction of Mughal power."

==== Malay Archipelago ====
Wars of succession after the death of Hayam Wuruk, such as the Regreg War (1404–1406), are commonly recognised to have weakened the Javanese empire of Majapahit in the 15th century, and to have been one of the leading causes of its eventual downfall in 1527. The Samudera Pasai Sultanate in northern Sumatra experienced a throne struggle in 1412–1415, in which the Ming Chinese fourth treasure voyage of admiral Zheng He intervened. Starting with the death of Sultan Agung of Mataram in 1645, every time the sultan of Mataram died, a war of succession broke out, and these recurrent conflicts crippled the state. From the Trunajaya rebellion (1674–1681) onwards, the Dutch East India Company (VOC) began to exploit the dynastic crises to expand its economic, political and territorial control over Java by supporting their preferred candidate for the throne with superior firepower, in return for extensive concessions upon victory. The Javanese Wars of Succession (1703–1755) enabled the company to weaken and eventually split Mataram into smaller states that it could easily control. An early 19th-century British writer observed: "In Malay States, a War of Succession almost invariably follows the decease of the Rajah, and with their other feudal contentions are the bane of them all — oppressing the inhabitants, checking industry, and obstructing commerce." He recommended that the British government take certain measures to prevent these wars from happening in the interest of both natives and foreigners, but argued that the English should not become "conquerors and oppressors" to the Malays, "as the Dutch are in all their possessions throughout the Archipelago". The British would establish "indirect rule" over the Malay States and turned the sultans essentially into their agents. In 1819, the British would exploit the Johor Sultanate's succession crisis to partition its territory with the Dutch, keeping mainland Johor, including Singapore, for themselves and ceding the Riau-Lingga Sultanate to the Netherlands. While Brunei remained an absolute monarchy, the kings of independent Malaysia have assumed more ceremonial roles of identity within a constitutional framework.

==== Ottoman Empire ====
The Ottoman Empire was an Islamic dynasty originating in Asia Minor, which gradually expanded into Southeastern Europe and made Constantinople its capital upon conquering it in 1453; it developed unique succession practices which "departed sharply from the usual inheritance practices for almost all of its history." Three customs can be distinguished: survival of the fittest, fratricide, and rule of the eldest. From the 14th through the late 16th centuries, the Ottomans practiced open succession – something historian Donald Quataert has described as "survival of the fittest, not eldest, son." Following common Central Asian tradition, during their father's lifetime, all adult sons of the reigning sultan were given provincial governorships in order to gain experience in administration, accompanied and mentored by their retinues and tutors. Upon the death of their father, the reigning sultan, these sons would fight amongst themselves for the succession until one emerged triumphant. The first son to reach the capital and seize control of the court would usually become the new ruler. The first such instance was the brief Ottoman war of succession of 1362 after the death of sultan Orhan, between şehzade (prince) Murad I, şehzade Ibrahim Bey (1316–1362; governor of Eskişehir) and şehzade Halil. Murad won and executed his half-brothers Ibrahim and Halil, the first recorded instance of Ottoman royal fratricide. In 1451, Mehmed II became the first Ottoman prince who, upon, seizing the capital, executed all his brothers before any war of succession could even break out. Although at the time, Islamic and Christian societies alike would condemn such a move as an immoral and sinful act of murder, Mehmed and subsequent would-be sultans would justify it as the prerogative of the ruler to commit (peace-time) fratricide in order to ensure the order and stability of the realm. Ottoman royal fratricide would continue until 1648, and only happen once more in 1808. In 1617, the Ottoman dynasty would adopt a system of succession called ekberiyet, by which the oldest surviving male relative of the deceased sultan (often an uncle or brother) would assume the throne. This was combined with the kafes ("gilded cage") system in 1622, which put all male members of the royal family under house arrest within the palace grounds, to ensure a pool of potential successors under the control of the reigning sultan. The ekberiyet–kafes practices would prevail until the end of the Ottoman Empire and the abolition of the Ottoman sultanate in 1922.

==== Vietnam ====
About the Hoa Lư-based early Vietnamese kingdom of Đại Cồ Việt (968–1054), Nicholas Tarling (1992) noted: "the Hoa-lu kings ruled chiefly by threat of violence, and the death of each one was followed by a war of succession." By contrast, rulers of the later Trần dynasty (1225–1400) had adopted the practice of "[abdicating] the throne to their chosen adult heirs upon the death of their predecessors, thereafter ruling as 'senior' kings." Tarling added that "the Tran kings made decisions in consultation with their uncles, brothers, and cousins, thereby fostering solidarity within the royal clan", and that the dynasty began to collapse when these rules were no longer observed. When the childless king Trần Dụ Tông failed to designate an heir, his death in 1369 marked the beginning of two decades of succession-based warfare, until prime minister Hồ Quý Ly seized power and restored order in 1390, and abolished the Tran dynasty in favour of his own in 1400.

==== Siam/Thailand ====
With the exception of Naresuan's succession by Ekathotsarot in 1605, "the method of royal succession at Ayutthaya throughout the seventeenth century was battle." Although European visitors to Thailand at the time tried to discern any rules in the Siamese order of succession, noting that in practice the dead king's younger brother often succeeded him, this custom appears not to have been legally enshrined anywhere. The ruling king did often bestow the title of uparaja ('viceroy') upon his preferred successor, but in reality, it was an "elimination process": any male member of the royal clan (usually the late king's brothers and sons) could claim the throne of Ayutthaya for himself, and win by defeating all his rivals. Moreover, groupings of nobles, foreign merchants, and foreign mercenaries actively rallied behind their preferred candidates in hopes of benefiting from each war's outcome.

=== European patterns ===
==== Causes ====
"Whereas Charles the Second, king of Spain, of most glorious memory, being not long since dead without issue, his Sacred Imperial Majesty has claimed the succession in the kingdoms and provinces of the deceased king, as lawfully belonging to his august family; but the most Christian King, aiming at the same succession for his grandson the duke of Anjou, and pretending a right did accrue to him by a certain will of the deceased king, has usurped the possession of the entire inheritance, or Spanish monarchy, for the aforementioned duke of Anjou, and invaded by his arms the provinces of the Spanish Low Countries, and the Dutchy of Milan..."

— Emperor Leopold I proclaims his position on the War of the Spanish Succession in the Treaty of The Hague (1701)

The origins of wars of succession in Europe lie in feudal or absolutist systems of government, in which the decisions on war and peace could be made by a single sovereign without the population's consent. The politics of the respective rulers was mainly driven by dynastic interests. German historian Johannes Kunisch (1937–2015) ascertained: "The all-driving power was the dynasties' law of the prestige of power, the expansion of power, and the desire to maintain themselves." Moreover, the legal and political coherence of the various provinces of a "state territory" often consisted merely in nothing more than having a common ruler (a personal union). Early government systems were therefore based on dynasties, the extinction of which immediately brought on a state crisis. The composition of the governmental institutions of the various provinces and territories also eased their partitioning in case of a conflict, just like the status of claims on individual parts of the country by foreign monarchs.

Early medieval Europe was rife with conflicts over property or property rights. R. I. Moore (2000) characterised the situation as "apparently endless and pointless internecine conflict which raged at every level of aristocratic society from the tenth century onwards. It continued everywhere in Latin Europe (though taking a somewhat different form to the east of the Rhine) throughout the eleventh century, and did not subside in most regions until well into the twelfth." Usually, a designated or prospective heir to a property (typically but not always the owner's oldest son) would face off demands by uncles and brothers, aunts and sisters (often represented by their husbands) and their children to grant them a fair share in the inheritance. Moore stated: "Title to landed property would always remain a source of endless and bitter contention, governed by infinitely various and complicated combinations of differing legal traditions and local customs and conditions."

==== Justifications ====
Justifications and arguments for war may be put forward in a declaration of war, to indicate that one is justly taking up arms. As the Dutch lawyer Hugo Grotius (1583–1645) noted, these must make clear that one is unable to pursue their rightful claims in any other way. The claims to legal titles from the dynastic sphere were a strong reason for war, because international relations primarily consisted of inheritance and marriage policies until the end of the Ancien Régime. These were often so intertwined that it had to lead to conflict. Treaties that led to hereditary linkages, pawning and transfers made various relations more complicated, and could be utilised for claims as well. That claims were made at all is due to the permanent struggle for competition and prestige between the respective ruling houses. On top of that came the urge of contemporary princes to achieve "glory" for themselves.

==== Prince-bishoprics ====
In some cases, wars of succession in Europe could also be centred around the reign in prince-bishoprics. Although these were formally elective monarchies without hereditary succession, the election of the prince-bishop could be strongly intertwined with the dynastic interests of the noble families involved, each of whom would put forward their own candidates. Moreover, the prince-bishops were monarchs of considerable territorial regions, making the change to place a dynastic ally on their thrones potentially invaluable. In case of disagreement over the election result, waging war was a crude but effective way of settling the conflict. In the Holy Roman Empire, such wars were known as diocesan feuds.

==== Primogeniture and international law ====
After numerous familial conflicts, the principle of male primogeniture originated in Western Europe in the 11th century, spreading to the rest of Europe (with the exception of Kievan Rus' and subsequent Rus' principalities (Note: According to Alexander Presnyakov (1918), the reason why many of the northeastern Rus' principalities had a strong "tendency towards internecine struggle" and were "continually at war with one another" was because they repeatedly "fragment[ed] into small independent entities" when sons received shares of their fathers' patrimonies. This weakened them, and because the Grand Duchy of Moscow (Muscovy) was able to prevent almost all such succession conflicts, it was capable to conquering the other principalities. Gustave Alef (1956) added that the Muscovite War of Succession (1425–1453) was "the only struggle for succession in Moscow's history", arguing that unlike its neighbours, Muscovy never experienced any other dynastic wars because "the death rate in the Moscow family was so high that the dynasty barely maintained itself. When the inheritors to the family patrimony increased sharply at the end of the fourteenth century, an internecine struggle was foreordained. This element helps explain the stability and strength of Moscow in the fourteenth century.")) in the 12th and 13th century; it has never been widely adopted outside Europe. This restricted the number of potential heirs to the oldest son of the reigning monarch, thereby facilitating undivided inheritance and a great reduction of potential sources of property conflict. Another major effect of the near-universal introduction of male primogeniture was the strengthening of patrilineality, and the structural undermining and destruction of the women's property rights, be they mothers, wives or daughters. For example, women in northern Italy, who had the ancient right to inherit a tercia, one third of their husband's estate, lost it in the 12th century (Genoa: 1143).

However, it did not prevent the outbreak of wars of succession altogether. A true deluge of succession wars occurred in Europe between the Thirty Years' War (1618–1648) and the Coalition Wars (1792–1815). According to German historian Heinz Duchhardt (1943) the outbreak of wars of succession in the early modern period was stimulated on the one hand by the uncertainty about the degree to which regulations and agreements on hereditary succession were to be considered a respectable part of emerging international law. On the other hand, there was also a lack of effective means to provide them recognition and validation. Jeroen Duindam (2021) noted that, 'when the internal challenges to dynastic supremacy had abated' in 17th- and 18th-century Europe, the royal courts forged more and more marriages alliances with the ruling houses of other sovereign states, which 'helps to explain the prevalence of international wars of succession' in that period.

Wars of succession in Europe gradually came to an end in the 19th century, when absolute monarchies were replaced by an international order based on democracy, featuring constitutional monarchies or republics.

== In popular culture ==
- Wars of Succession, a 2018 strategy video game developed by AGEod about the War of the Spanish Succession (1701–1714) and the Great Northern War (1700–1721), most of which focused around the succession of Poland.
- Age of Empires IV, a 2021 strategy video game developed by Relic Entertainment, features a campaign that includes William the Conqueror's Norman Conquest (1066–1075) as well as the Rebellion of 1088, a war of succession between William's sons upon his death.

== In fiction ==
- In J.R.R. Tolkien's fantasy world of Middle-earth (developed 1937–1973), several wars of succession take place, such as:
  - The Wars with Angmar (T.A. 861–1975), after King Eärendur of Arnor died in T.A. 861 and the kingdom was split between his three quarreling sons, founding the rival realms of Arthedain, Cardolan and Rhudaur. When the lines of Eärendur died out in Cardolan and Rhudaur, King Argeleb I of Arthedain intended to reunite Arnor in T.A. 1349 and was recognised by Cardolan, but then the Witch-king of Angmar intervened, annexed Rhudaur, ravaged Cardolan and besieged Arthedain's capital city of Fornost. In T.A. 1973–1975, Arthedain was finally destroyed; even though allied Men from Gondor and Elves from Lindon subsequently succeeded in defeating Angmar in the Battle of Fornost and driving out the Witch-king, the Kingdom of Arnor would never be restored until the dawn of the Fourth Age by Aragorn.
- The Succession Wars (1980), a wargame set in the BattleTech universe
- The Successions, civil wars over the monarchy of Andor in The Wheel of Time (1990–2013)
- The books in George R.R. Martin's A Song of Ice and Fire series (1996–) and its TV adaptation, Game of Thrones feature the War of the Five Kings, based around five individuals declaring themselves king, three of whom compete over the Iron Throne after the death of King Robert Baratheon. Another is the Targaryen war of succession, better known as the Dance of the Dragons; this particular conflict is the focal point of the House of the Dragon series.
- The Elder Scrolls, a high fantasy video game series, features many succession disputes and wars. For example, in The Elder Scrolls Online (launched in 2014), a war of succession that happened almost a decade earlier over the kingdom of Eastern Skyrim is reignited. After their sister Queen Nurnhilde died in battle 10 years ago, the twin brothers Jorunn and Fildgor together drove out the invading Akaviri, but then fought over the throne afterwards. According to Jorunn, they 'disagreed on who should succeed our sister. I believed in diplomacy and wisdom. Fildgor believed in rule by force. I couldn't let him take the throne. (...) I was forced to exile Fildgor. He never forgave me for that.' Jorunn requests the player to militarily support his legitimacy as the discontent Fildgor returns in another attempt to seize the kingship.
- In Tui T. Sutherland's series of children's' novels, Wings of Fire, the first five books center a war of succession which began after the death of a dragon queen, with most of the other tribes allying with one of the three contenders for the SandWing throne.

== See also ==
- Ottoman dynasty § Succession practices (including royal fratricide)
- Political mutilation in Byzantine culture
- Restoration (disambiguation)
- Royalism
