= Michael of Imereti =

Michael
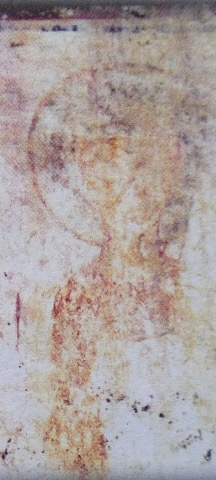
- Fresco of King Michael in the Gelati Monastery.

King of Western Georgia
- Reign: 1327–1329
- Predecessor: Constantine I
- Successor: Bagrat I
- Died: 1329
- Burial: Gelati Monastery
- Issue: Bagrat I of Imereti
- Dynasty: Bagrationi
- Father: David VI
- Mother: Tamar Amanelisdze or Theodora Doukaina Palaeologina
- Religion: Georgian Orthodox Church

Michael (Georgian: მიქელი, romanized: mikeli; died in 1329) from the Bagrationi dynasty, was the king (mepe) of the Kingdom of Western Georgia from 1327 to 1329. He claimed the throne following the accession of his brother Constantine I in 1293, but only succeeded in obtaining it after nearly thirty-five years of civil war, in 1327.

== Biography ==
=== Early life ===
Michael was probably born during the second half of the 13th century. He was the son of King David VI and his wife, whose identity is debated among historians. Genealogists identify her either as the noblewoman Tamar Amanelisdze or as a Byzantine princess—possibly an illegitimate daughter of the wife of the sebastocrator and despot John Palaiologos, or of Theodora Doukaina Vatatzaina, the wife of Emperor Michael VIII Palaiologos. Georgian chroniclers also claim that Michael’s mother was herself an illegitimate daughter of Michael VIII.

According to Cyril Toumanoff, Michael received his name—unusual for a medieval Georgian prince—in honor of his maternal grandfather, Michael VIII. Little is known about his youth, and he only appears in historical records following the accession of his elder brother Constantine I to the throne of Imereti.

=== Rebellion ===
Constantine I ascended the throne upon the death of his father in 1293. However, Michael, who also sought power, rebelled against his brother and usurped the throne with the support of several loyal followers. He soon managed to seize control of the northern provinces of the kingdom, including Racha, Lechkhumi, and Argveti, leading to a civil war between the claimant and the legitimate monarch. Several attempts were made to negotiate peace, but none succeeded, and the conflict continued throughout Constantine’s reign. The Georgian Chronicles report that powerful nobles made efforts to reconcile the two brothers.

Despite these attempts, the leading nobles of western Georgia were not sincerely striving for peace. The conflict caused by Michael’s usurpation led to significant feudal unrest in Imereti. The George I Dadiani took advantage of the situation to seize the territories of the duchy of Tskhumi and Odishi, expanding his domain along the northeastern coast of the Black Sea up to Anacopia. The Sharvashidze princes took possession of the rest of Abkhazia, while Guria and Svaneti each gained de facto independence. The divisions that arose during Michael’s usurpation remained a defining feature of the region’s politics, persisting under his successors until the annexation of Imereti by the Russian Empire in 1810.

=== Reign ===
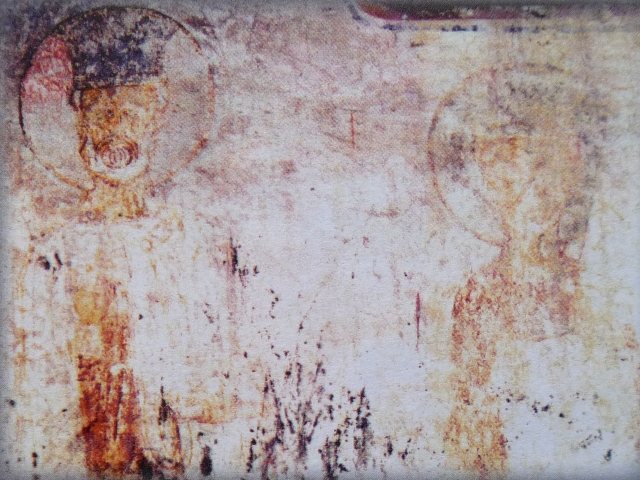
King Constantine I and King Michael at Gelati Monastery.

The civil war did not alter the line of succession. After roughly three decades of fraternal conflict, Constantine I died in 1327 without any known heirs. As the legitimate successor, Michael was called to the throne to rule as King of the Western Georgia. Although he had claimed the title earlier, as in the 1326 charter sanctioning a reparational payment (sasiskhlo, a Georgian equivalent of weregild) by a certain Gogitashvili to Mikeladze.

Michael’s reign was marked by his attempts to reconcile with the nobles who had declared independence during the civil war. However, negotiations with the Dadiani, the Gurieli, and other eristavis proved unsuccessful, leaving western Georgia divided into several principalities and lordships. The chronicler Vakhushti Bagrationi mentions several failed usurpations during Michael’s reign, which contributed to the king’s political difficulties.

The Georgian Chronicles also note that the only agreements Michael concluded with the nobility during his short reign concerned military alliances and the collection of taxes. In foreign affairs, it is likely that Michael maintained full independence from both the Mongols and the rest of the Kingdom of Georgia.

Nothing more is known about King Michael of Imereti. In 1329, he died under unknown circumstances, leaving his only son, the minor Bagrat I, known as Mtsire, as his heir and successor. Bagrat I, who, owing to his minority, never firmly sat on the throne and was reduced to the position of a vassal duke by the resurgent King George V the Brilliant, in 1330.

== Bibliography ==
- Brosset, Marie-Félicité (1856). Histoire de la Géorgie depuis l'Antiquité jusqu'au XIXe siècle - IIe partie: Histoire moderne. Saint Petersburg Academy of Sciences.
- Asatiani, Nodar (2008). Საქართველოს ისტორია II [History of Georgia, Volume 2] (in Georgian). Tbilisi: Tbilisi University Press. ISBN 978-9941-13-004-5.

Preceded by Constantine I	King of Western Georgia; 1327–1329	Succeeded by Bagrat I
