= Bagrat I of Imereti =

King of Imereti

Bagrat I

King of Imereti (Western Georgia)
- Reign: 1329–1330
- Predecessor: Michael
- Successor: Annexation by Georgia

Duke of Imereti
- Reign: 1330–1372
- Successor: Alexander I
- Died: 1372
- Spouse: Natela Jaqeli (m. 1358)
- Issue: Alexander I of Imereti; George I of Imereti; Constantine II of Imereti
- Dynasty: Bagrationi
- Father: Michael of Imereti
- Religion: Georgian Orthodox Church

Bagrat I the Minor (Georgian: ბაგრატ მცირე, romanized: bagrat' mtsire; died 1372), of the Bagrationi dynasty, was king of Western Georgia from 1329 until 1330, when he was reduced to a vassal duke by George V of Georgia.

== Biography ==
Bagrat was the only known son of King Michael of Imereti, on whose death he succeeded in 1329. Still a minor at this time (hence, his moniker mts'ire), Bagrat was compelled to remain in his capital, Kutaisi, as the provinces were being divided by the rivaling noble factions. In 1330, George V of Georgia took advantage of the situation and of being Bagrat's relative and crossed the Likhi Range into Imereti, being welcomed by many Imeretians, weary of persistent violence and anarchy. Imereti was conquered and the integrity of the Kingdom of Georgia restored. Henceforth, Bagrat sat as eristavi ("duke") in Imereti, with his seat in Shorapani, under the tutelage of George V.

== Family ==
In 1358, Bagrat married Natela, daughter of Qvarqvare I Jaqeli, Atabeg of Samtskhe, with the permission of King David IX. They had three sons:

- Alexander I of Imereti (died 1389), who ruled as Duke of Imereti from 1372 to 1387 and as King of Imereti from 1387 until his death in 1389;
- George I of Imereti (died 1392), who succeeded his brother as King of Imereti and was killed in battle against the Duke of Mingrelia in 1392;
- Constantine II of Imereti (died 1401), who ruled as King of Imereti from 1396 until his death in 1401.

== Bibliography ==
- Brosset, Marie-Félicité (1856). Histoire de la Georgie depuis l'antiquite jusqu'au 19. siecle (in French). Vol. 5. l'acad. Imper. des sciences.

Preceded by Michael I	King of Imereti; 1329–1330	Succeeded by Alexander I
