= Constantine II of Imereti =

Constantine II

King of Western Georgia
- Reign: 1396–1401
- Predecessor: George I
- Successor: Annexation by Georgia
- Died: 1401
- Dynasty: Bagrationi
- Father: Bagrat I of Imereti
- Mother: Natela Jaqeli
- Religion: Georgian Orthodox Church

Constantine II (Georgian: კონსტანტინე II, romanized: k'onst'ant'ine II; died 1401), of the Bagrationi dynasty, was king of Western Georgia from 1396 until his death in 1401.

== Biography ==
Constantine was the third son of Bagrat I, then duke (and ex-king) of Imereti, and his wife, Natela, daughter of Qvarqvare I Jaqeli. He was a younger brother of two successive kings of Imereti, Alexander I and George I, who had broken away from the Kingdom of Georgia during Timurid invasions of Georgia.

After the death of George I in the battle with Vameq I Dadiani, Duke of Mingrelia, in 1392, Constantine and his nephew, Demetrius, son of Alexander, fled to the Caucasian mountains, while Imereti was reintegrated by George VII of Georgia. In 1396, Constantine took advantage of George VII's continuous war with Timur—in which a great number of Imeretians died—and the death of Vameq Dadiani and returned to Imereti. He conquered a number of fortresses in the country and proclaimed himself king. Subsequently, he attempted to win over the dukes of Mingrelia and Guria, and the Svans, but he was killed in 1401. As Constantine was childless, the crown of Imereti was to be passed on to his young and weak nephew, Demetrius, but Imereti was reconquered by George VII of Georgia.

Preceded by Annexation by Georgia	King of Imereti; 1396–1401	Succeeded by Annexation by Georgia
