= George I of Imereti =

George I

King of Western Georgia (Imereti)
- Reign: 1389–1392
- Predecessor: Alexander I
- Successor: Annexation by Georgia in 1396 Constantine II
- Died: 1392
- Dynasty: Bagrationi
- Father: Bagrat I of Imereti
- Mother: Natela Jaqeli
- Religion: Georgian Orthodox Church

George I (Georgian: გიორგი I, romanized: giorgi I; died 1392), of the Bagrationi dynasty, was king of Western Georgia (Imereti) from 1389 to 1392.

== Biography ==
George was the second son of Bagrat I of Imereti, the duke (and ex-king) of Imereti, and his wife, Natela, daughter of Qvarqvare I Jaqeli.

He succeeded as king of Imereti on the death of his elder brother, Alexander I, who had proclaimed himself king in opposition to King Bagrat V of Georgia during Timur's invasion of the country. Unlike his predecessor, George initially enjoyed more success in consolidating his power over Imereti; more fortresses were seized from Bagrat's loyalists and his protégé, Arsen, was installed as catholicos of the church in 1390. In 1392, he led his army to subdue Vameq I Dadiani, Duke of Mingrelia, but he suffered a crushing defeat and was killed on the battlefield. At Vameq's invitation, Bagrat V's son, George VII, occupied Imereti, reuniting it with the Kingdom of Georgia. George's brother, Constantine, and nephew, Demetrius, son of Alexander I, fled to the North Caucasus, in the Balkar lands (Basiani of the Georgian sources).

Preceded by Alexander I	King of Imereti; 1389–1392	Succeeded by Annexation by Georgia
