= Constantine I of Imereti =

King of Imereti

Constantine I
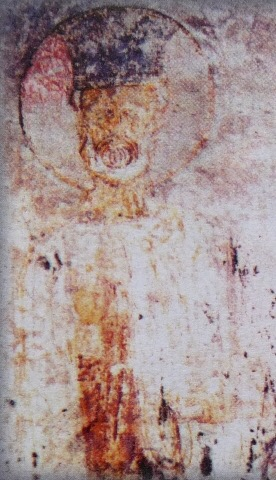
- Fresco of Constantine I from the Gelati Monastery.

King of Western Georgia
- Reign: 1293–1327
- Predecessor: David I
- Successor: Michael
- Died: 1327
- Burial: Gelati Monastery
- Spouse: Tamar
- Dynasty: Bagrationi
- Father: David VI
- Mother: Tamar Amanelisdze
- Religion: Georgian Orthodox Church

Constantine I (Georgian: კონსტანტინე I, Konstantine I; died 1327), from the Bagrationi dynasty, was king of Western Georgia from 1293 to 1327.

== Accession and civil war ==
A son of the Georgian king David VI Narin and his wife, Tamar Amanelisdze, or a Palaeologian princess. Constantine succeeded to the throne of Western Georgia upon his father's death in 1293. Unlike his eastern Georgian counterparts, Constantine remained independent from the Ilkhanid hegemony, but he faced serious internal unrest as his younger brother Michael opposed his accession and seized control of the regions of Racha, Lechkhumi, and Argveti. In vain did the nobles of Imereti try to reconcile the brothers and internecine conflict continued to upset the country.

The great nobles took advantage of the situation to assert their autonomy. Giorgi I Dadiani, Duke of Mingrelia, subjugated much of the duchy of Tskhumi and expanded his possessions up to Anakopia. The Sharvashidze entrenched in Abkhazia, the Gurieli in Guria, and Vardanidze in Svaneti, showing little subservience to the royal authority. Constantine died amid these disturbances in 1327, having had no children, and his brother Michael succeeded him as king.

== Culture ==
Constantine is known to have restored Monastery of the Cross in Jerusalem to the Georgian ownership in 1305. He also had the monastery refurbished and repainted. His contributions are emphasized in a document instituting the Agape feast, in his own lifetime, on 21 May, the feast day of Constantine the Great. Constantine might have been an unidentified royal person depicted on a fresco in Ienashi in Upper Svaneti. His links to that region is also known from a charter issued by Constantine to the Svan Goshkoteliani clan.

Preceded by David I	King of Imereti; 1293–1327	Succeeded by Michael I
