= Demetrius, Duke of Imereti =

Demetrius

Duke of Imereti
- Reign: 1414–1455
- Monarch: Alexander I (1414–1442); Vakhtang IV (1442–1446); George VIII (1446–1455)
- Died: 1455
- Dynasty: Bagrationi
- Father: Alexander I of Imereti
- Religion: Georgian Orthodox Church

Demetrius (Georgian: დემეტრე, romanized: demet're;died 1455) was a Georgian royal prince of the Bagrationi dynasty. He was a duke of Imereti from 1414 until his death in 1455

== Biography ==
Demetrius was a son of King Alexander I of Imereti, who had broken away from the Kingdom of Georgia during Timur's invasions of that country in 1387. After his uncle, King George I, was killed in 1392, Demetrius was carried away by another uncle, Constantine, to seek refuge in the Caucasian mountains. They were able to return to Imereti in 1396, when Constantine was proclaimed king. He died childless in 1401, leaving the throne to the young and weak Demetrius. His accession was prevented, however, by King George VII of Georgia, who, once freed from a protracted war with Timur, invaded Imereti. The Dadiani of Mingrelia and Imeretian nobles captured Demetrius and delivered him to George, who treated him with consideration and sent him to a safe retreat in Somkhiti, in Kartli. Alexander I of Georgia, who married Demetrius's sister Tamar c. 1415, restored him to Imereti as a vassal eristavi ("duke"). He remained loyal to the Georgian crown and died in 1455.

A claim by the early-18th-century Georgian historian, Prince Vakhushti of Kartli, that Bagrat VI, the forefather of the subsequent dynasty of Imeretian kings, was Demetrius's son is false. The version was adopted by Marie-Félicité Brosset in the 19th century and survived into the 20th. It has been rejected by a number of scholars and Cyril Toumanoff eventually elucidated Bagrat's true origin as a grandson of Constantine I of Georgia.
