= David VI =

David VI დავით VI
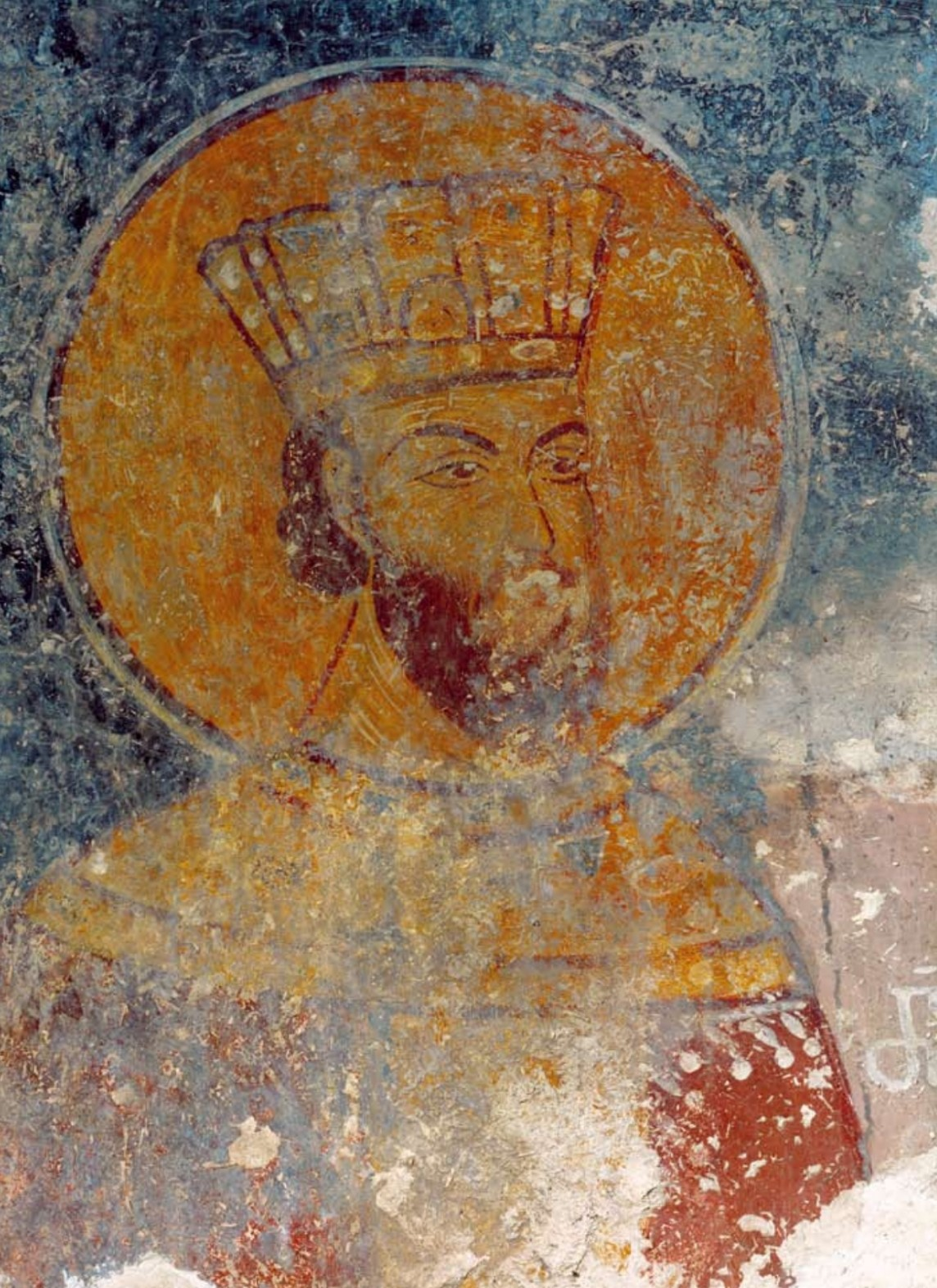
- A 13th-century fresco of David VI from the Gelati Monastery.

King of Georgia
- Reign: 1246–1259
- Predecessor: Rusudan
- Successor: David VII
- Co-monarch: David VII

King of Western Georgia
- Reign: 1259–1293
- Successor: Constantine I
- Born: 1225
- Died: 1293 (aged 67–68); Kutaisi
- Burial: Gelati Monastery
- Spouse: Tamar Amanelisdze; Theodora Doukaina Palaeologina
- Issue: Vakhtang II; Constantine I of Imereti; Michael of Imereti; Prince Alexander
Names
- David VI the Junior; David VI Narin
- Dynasty: Bagrationi
- Father: Ghias ad-din
- Mother: Rusudan of Georgia
- Religion: Georgian Orthodox Church
- Khelrtva

David VI Narin (Georgian: დავით VI ნარინი, romanized: davit VI narini) (also called the Clever) (1225–1293), from the Bagrationi dynasty, was joint king (mepe) of Georgia with his cousin David VII from to 1246 to 1256. He made secession in 1259, and from 1259 to 1293, ruled a Kingdom of Western Georgia under the name David I, while his cousin David VII continued to rule in a reduced Kingdom of Georgia (1256–1329) in eastern Georgia, under Mongol control.

== Life ==
The son of Queen Rusudan by her Seljuk husband, Ghias ad-din, David was crowned at Kutaisi, as joint sovereign by his mother in 1230. Fearing that her nephew David would claim the throne at her death, Rusudan held the latter prisoner at the court of her son-in-law, the Seljuk sultan Kaykhusraw II, and in 1243 sent her son David to the Mongol court of Batu Khan in Karakorum to get official recognition as heir apparent. She died in 1245, still waiting for her son to return. He was retained for three years at the Mongol court in Karakorum, until he was able to attend the enthronement of Guyuk Khan with his cousin David VII in August 1246.

Since David was believed by the Georgian nobles to have disappeared, two years later in 1245, they had proclaimed his cousin David VII Ulu, who had been freed on the death of Kaykhusraw, as king of Georgia. In 1246, David, son of Rusudan, was recognized by Güyük Khan as junior co-king to his cousin David. Thereafter known as David VI Narin (i.e. “the junior”) and David VII Ulu (i.e. “the senior”), the cousins ruled jointly from 1247 to 1248 upon their return, until 1259, when the former rose, unsuccessfully, against the Mongol yoke and, then, fled to Kutaisi, from whence he reigned over western Georgia (Imereti) as a separate ruler.

In 1259, David VI rebelled against his suzerain, although he did not drag his royal colleague into the rebellion. The Ilkhanate soon put an end to this revolt after a few short, bloody battles, while David VI managed to take refuge in western Georgia. Arriving in Kutaisi, one of the largest towns in western Georgia, he declared the secession of the domains west of the Likhi mountains, and was proclaimed King of western Georgia by the local nobility.

The kingdom created by David VI included a number of powerful duchies controlling several Black Sea ports, including the duchies of Guria, Mingrelia and Abkhazia, which contained the cities of Batumi and Poti. To the north, the kingdom controlled the duchies of Svaneti and Racha, thus controlling the Caucasus mountains against the empire of the Golden Horde. This situation enabled the new government of Kutaisi to maintain important trade routes with the West, notably via the Genoese merchants based in Abkhazia and the Empire of Trebizond, leading to a large-scale immigration of Georgian nobles and merchants from eastern Georgia.

David VI Narin even managed to shelter and share his throne with his cousin, David VII Ulu, when the latter in turn revolted against the Mongol yoke in 1261; this agreement was short-lived and the two sovereigns were unable to work together to protect western Georgia, leading to David Ulu's return to Tbilisi, eastern Georgia in 1262. Thus, Georgia split into two parts and both rulers continued to be titled king of Georgia. However, David Ulu surrendered to Hulegu Khan thus becoming a nominal vassal of the Ilkhans in 1262.

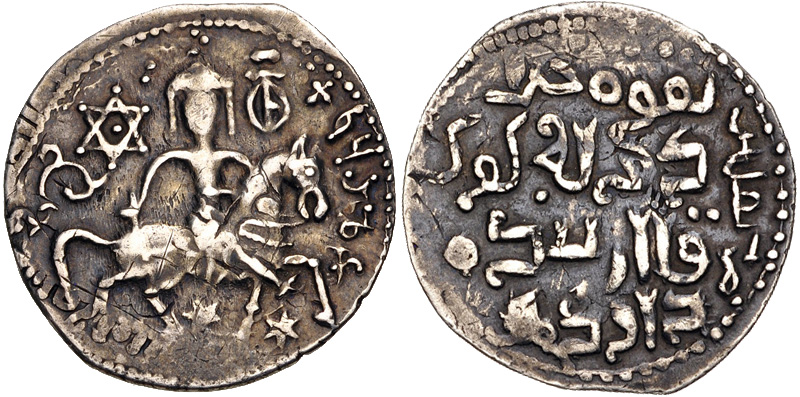
Coin of David VI Narin citing Great Khan Güyük as overlord (Tiflis mint), dated 1247

He developed friendly relations with the Golden Horde and the Bahri dynasty of Egypt, and repulsed the Ilkhanate attacks. In 1269, David gave shelter to Teguder, relative of the Chagatai Baraq Khan, who had rebelled against the Ilkhan ruler Abaqa Khan. When Teguder's force began terrorizing the Georgian population, David sided with Abaqa's general Shiramun Noyan. Despite this, Abaqa attempted to overthrow David with the help of the renegade lord of Racha Kakhaber Kakhaberisdze, and sent two expeditions against Imereti in the 1270s. Nevertheless, David VI Narin succeeded in retaining his independence and attempted to restore Georgian influence in the Empire of Trebizond. For this purpose, he marched to Trebizond during Emperor John II Comnenus’ absence at Constantinople in April 1282; and although he failed to take the city, the Georgians occupied several provinces.

In 1282, during John's absence from Trebizond, David VI tried to restore Georgian influence in the empire, David invaded the empire in April 1282 and captured many provinces (including the historical Chaneti) and besieged the capital. Though David failed to take the city, the Georgians succeeded in annexing the eastern part of the empire.

In 1284, David VI helped John's half-sister Theodora, daughter of Manuel I and his second wife Rusudan, and possible niece of David VI, to seize the crown from her half-brother. She became empress for a few months, though soon in 1285 John II returned to the empire and regained power, and Queen Theodora took refuge in Georgia.

He died at Kutaisi in 1293. David was succeeded by his son, Constantine I. David is buried within the chapel (eukterion) of St. Andrew at the Cathedral of Nativity of the Theotokos of Gelati, east of the southern entrance to the church.

== Family ==
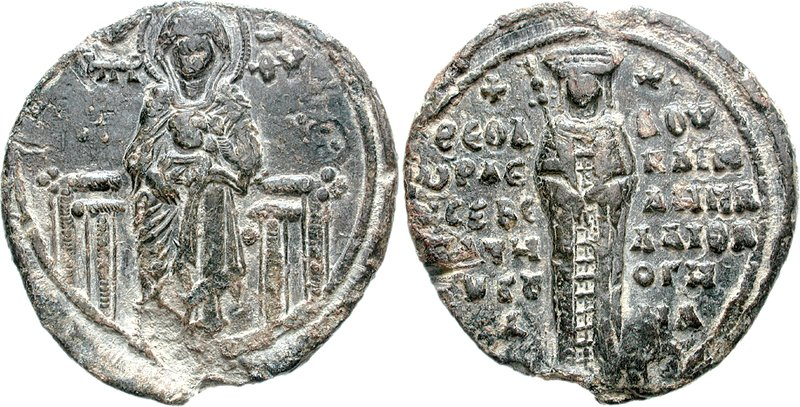
Coin representing Theodora Palaiologos, wife of King David VI.

David was married first to Tamar Amanelisdze. Their children were:

- Vakhtang II (died 1292), King of Georgia (r. 1289–1292)
- Constantine I of Imereti (died 1327), King of Western Georgia (r. 1293–1327)
- Michael of Imereti (died 1329), King of the Western Georgia (r. 1327–1329)

In 1254, he married Theodora, daughter of Byzantine Emperor Michael VIII Palaiologos. and they had one child:

- Prince Alexander.

== Bibliography ==
- Brosset, Marie-Félicité (1849). Histoire de la Géorgie depuis l'Antiquité jusqu'au XIXe siècle. Volume I [History of Georgia from Ancient Times to the 19th Century, Volume 1] (in French). Saint-Petersburg: Imperial Academy of Sciences.
- Salia, Kalistrat (1980). Histoire de la nation géorgienne. Nino Salia.
- Rayfield, Donald (2012). Edge of Empires, a History of Georgia. London: Reaktion Books. ISBN 978-1-78023-070-2.

Preceded by Rusudan	King of Georgia; 1246–1259	Succeeded by David VII
Preceded by None	King of Western Georgia; 1259–1293	Succeeded by Constantine I
