= Alexander I of Imereti =

Alexander I

King of Western Georgia (Imereti)
- Reign: 1387–1389
- Predecessor: Bagrat I
- Successor: George I

Duke of Imereti
- Reign: 1372–1378
- Predecessor: Bagrat I
- Successor: Himself as King
- Died: 1389
- Spouse: Ana
- Issue: Demetrius, Duke of Imereti; Tamar, Queen of Georgia
- Dynasty: Bagrationi
- Father: Bagrat I of Imereti
- Mother: Natela Jaqeli
- Religion: Georgian Orthodox Church

Alexander I (Georgian: ალექსანდრე I, romanized: aleksandre I; died 1389), of the Bagrationi dynasty, was king of Western Georgia from 1387 to 1389. Prior to that, he was eristavi ("duke") of Imereti under the authority of the kings of Georgia.

== Biography ==
Alexander was the eldest son of Bagrat I of Imereti, then duke (and ex-king) of Imereti, and his wife, Natela, daughter of Qvarqvare I Jaqeli, Atabeg of Samtskhe.

On his father's death in 1372, Alexander was appointed by King Bagrat V of Georgia as duke of Imereti. In 1387, he took advantage of Timur's invasions of Georgia and proclaimed himself king of Imereti at the Gelati Monastery, but the city of Kutaisi remained in the hands of Bagrat V's loyalists and the dukes of Mingrelia, Guria, Abkhazia, and Svaneti refused to join him. Alexander succeeded in seizing several fortresses in Imereti, but Kutaisi remained outside his control. He died in 1389 and was succeeded by his brother George I.

== Family ==
Alexander was married to a certain Ana. They had two children:

- Demetrius (died 1455), Duke of Imereti (1414–1455);
- Tamar, who married Alexander I of Georgia.

Preceded by Bagrat I	King of Imereti; 1387–1389	Succeeded by George I
