= Bana =

Bana may refer to:

== Languages ==
- Bana language of northern Cameroon
- Pa Na language of China
- Phanaʼ language of Laos

== People ==
- The Bana people of West Africa
- Bana, slayer of St. Juthwara
- Bana (singer), balladeer from Cape Verde
- Eric Bana (born 1968), Australian actor
- Bāṇabhaṭṭa, 7th-century Indian writer

== Places ==
- Bana, Burkina Faso, one of the 10 communes of the Balé Province of Burkina Faso
- Bana, Cameroon, a village
- Bana, Guinea
- Bana, Hungary, a village
- Bana, Rajasthan, in India
- Bana, Niger, a commune and village
- Bana Rural LLG, an administrative division of Papua New Guinea

== Other uses ==
- Bana, a 2019 album by Danheim
- Bana (fly), a genus of robber flies in the family Asilidae
- Bana Cathedral, a ruined medieval Christian cathedral in northeastern Turkey
- Bana kingdom, an ancient dynasty of South India
- Banasura, an asura in Hindu mythology
- Basic analog loop, a type of leased telecommunications line

== See also ==
- Banas (disambiguation)
- Banna people, an ethnic group in Ethiopia
- Banana (disambiguation)
