= Kanta =

Kanta may refer to:

== Arts and entertainment ==
- Shajarur Kanta, a 1967 Indian Bengali-language mystery novel by Sharadindu Bandyopadhyay
- Kulin Kanta, a 1925 Indian silent film
- Shajarur Kanta (1974 film), an Indian Bengali-language film
- Shajarur Kanta (2015 film), an Indian Bengali-language film
- Kanta (play), a Gujarati play by Manilal Dwivedi
- Kanta, a character from Ippatsu Kanta-kun Japanese anime
- Kanta, a character from My Neighbor Totoro Japanese anime

== Institutions ==
- Kanta Museum in Argungu, Nigeria

== Names ==
- Kanta (given name)
- Kanta (surname)

== Places ==
- Kanta, Raebareli, a village in Uttar Pradesh, India

== Other uses ==
- Kanta (shield), a traditional shield in Indonesia

== See also ==
- Kantha (disambiguation), a type of embroidery popular in eastern South Asia
- Chandra Kanta (disambiguation)
