= Banas =

Banas may refer to:

== Toponyms ==
- Banas River, a tributary of the Chambal River in Rajasthan, India
- West Banas River, a river in western India rising in Rajasthan and flowing south through the plains of Gujarat state into the Little Rann of Kutch
- Ras Banas, a peninsula in Egypt extending into the Red Sea
- Qarah Benas, also transliterated as Qareh Banās, a village in Khezel-e Gharbi Rural District, Kermanshah Province, Iran

== People ==
- Arlene Banas (born 1946), American actress
- Carl Banas (1929–2020), Canadian radio personality and actor
- Jozef Banáš (born 1948), Slovak novelist, journalist, diplomat and politician
- Ludovico Arroyo Bañas (1901–1979), official of the Philippine Bureau of Telecommunications
- Michala Banas (born 1978), New Zealand television actress and singer
- Robert Banas (1933–2024), American dancer, actor, choreographer and dance coach
- Steve Banas (1907–1974), American football player

== See also ==
- Ahar–Banas culture, also known as the Banas culture, a Chalcolithic archaeological culture in India from 3000 to 1500 BCE
- Banas Dairy, a dairy based in Banaskantha district of Gujarat, India
- Bana kingdom, a dynasty of South India, also known as the Banas
- Banas Medical College and Research Institute, Palanpur, Gujarat, India
- Banaś, a Polish surname
- Bana (disambiguation)
- Banas Kantha (disambiguation)
