= Collapse of the Kingdom of Georgia =

Fragmentation of the Georgian kingdom

The collapse of the Kingdom of Georgia (Georgian: საქართველოს სამეფოს დაშლა, romanized: sakartvelos samepos dashla) was a political and territorial fragmentation process that resulted in the dynastic triumvirate military conflict of the Bagrationi monarchs and war of succession in the united Kingdom of Georgia culminating during the second half of the 15th century.

The fragmentation of the unified realm started in the 13th century during the Mongol invasions that resulted in the establishment of de facto independent Kingdom of Western Georgia led by King David VI Narin and his successors, even though several reunifications would take place that would then bring back monarchy united in fold.

Nevertheless, the reunification came up to be ephemeral as the fragmentation would escalate through dynastic triarchy. Championed under the reign of King George VIII, it continued under Bagrat VI and Constantine II and included the entire country, with clashes all around the realm. The dynastic war began in the 1460s following the separatist pushes of the Principality of Samtskhe, leading to a series of conflicts between the central Kartli-based government of Tbilisi and royal contenders in Imereti and Kakheti. For three decades, Georgia was impoverished and weakened. In 1490, a peace was concluded following the formal division of the unified kingdom of Georgia into three independent kingdoms - Kartli, Kakheti and Imereti - thus ending a monarchy that had existed since 1008.

The conflict took place during the major geopolitical changes in the Near East, including the fall of the Byzantine Empire in 1453 and the rise of the Ottoman Empire. Simultaneously, the Timurid and Turkoman invasions would result severe political divisions within Georgia that would speed up the fragmentation of the kingdom.

== Historical context ==
At the dawn of the second half of the 15th century, the Kingdom of Georgia was the most powerful state in the Caucasus after the renaissance observed under the reign of King Alexander I the Great. However, the kingdom suffered greatly after the first Mongol invasion and from the massacres and destruction organized by the warlord Timur in the 1400s. Moreover, unlike the geopolitical situation of the Georgian Golden Age of the 13th century, the powers bordering Georgia strengthened, posing a far greater threat. In particular, the Turkoman tribes would unite to found the Qara Qoyunlu, a confederative empire that would sack Georgia from the 1410s.

In 1453, the Ottoman Turks of Anatolia took Constantinople, ending the Byzantine Empire, the seat of Orthodox Christianity since the 4th century. This isolated Georgia from the western world and the kingdom became the only Christian country in the Near East, which prompted the Georgian royalty and nobility to unite temporarily in order to incite the powers of Western Europe to embark on a new crusade. This effort quickly fizzled out, as the Europeans refused to see the Ottomans as a threat. Georgia had allies no more and found itself all alone surrounded by the powerful Muslim states. The decline in international trade, the disappearance of the kingdom's cultural allies and the growing threats in the Caucasus only sow poverty and desolation across Georgia, providing an ideal context for nobles wishing to gain more power from the central royal government.

== Fragmentation of monarchy ==
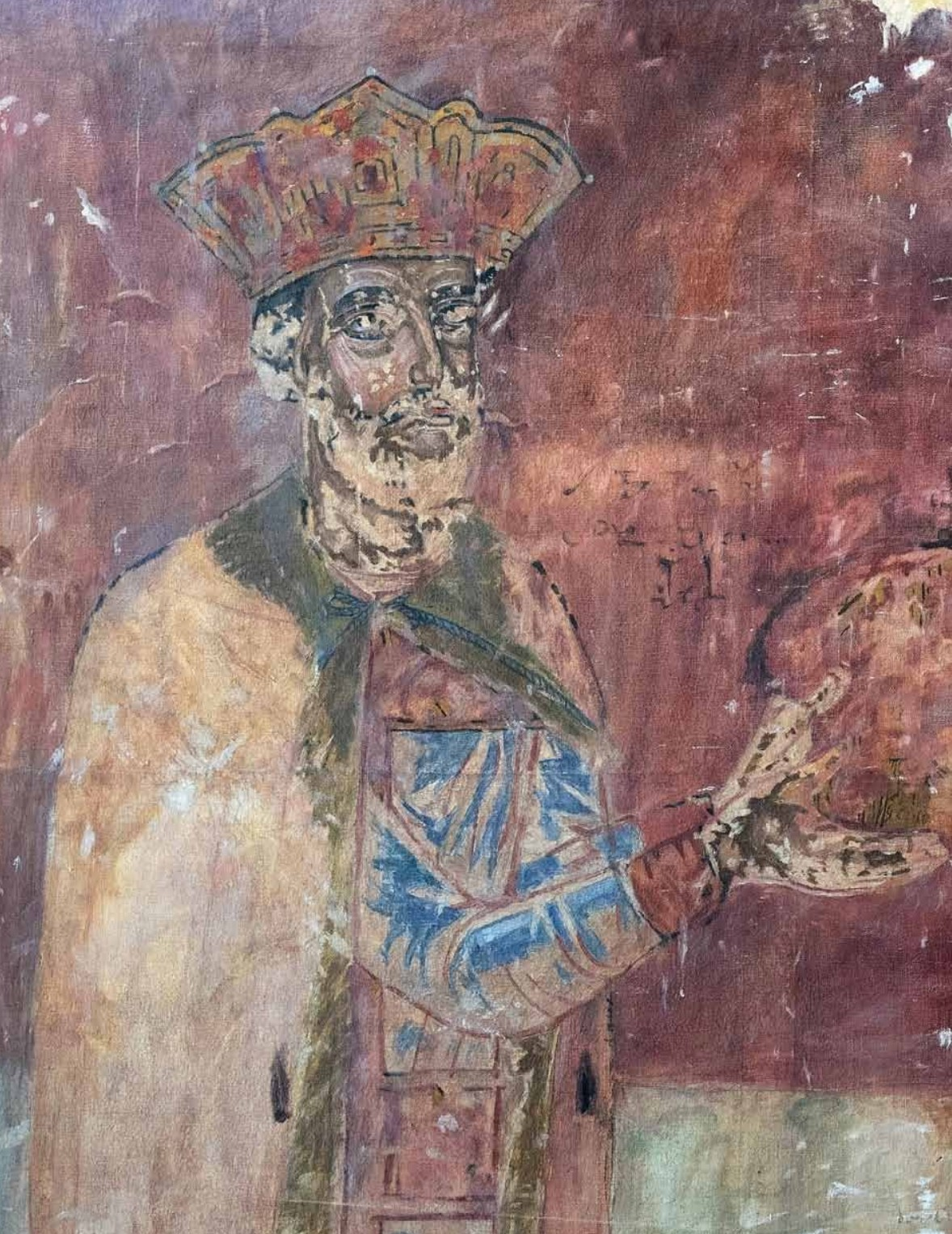
The decision of King Alexander I to divide the administration of the kingdom amongst his three sons is seen as the end of Georgian unity and the beginning of its collapse and the establishment of triarchy.

In order to protect the power of the central government over the provinces of the kingdom, King Alexander I designated in 1433 his three sons, Demetrius, Vakhtang and George, as co-kings, drawing inspiration from the ancient Byzantine tradition of naming the heirs to the imperial throne as co-emperors. Together, these co-kings would share the governance of the kingdom while Demetrius would take charge of Western Georgia, and his brother George would rule Kakheti.

However, this arrangement did not last long. In 1442, Alexander I abdicated and retired to a monastery, leaving the main crown to his eldest son, Vakhtang IV. He reigned for four years, a period marked by the domination of the most powerful nobles. He died without an heir in 1446, leaving the throne to his two younger brothers, who had to share a divided kingdom. Demetrius III, legitimate successor of Vakhtang IV, receives the duchy of Samokalako, while George VIII becomes the king of Kakheti and Kartli, before controlling the entire kingdom after the death of Demetrius in 1453.

The Principality of Samtskhe, ruled by the House of Jaqeli, was the first to officially leave the Georgian union when Qvarqvare II came to power in 1451. The latter proclaimed the religious independence of his state by confiscating the buildings of the Patriarchate of Georgia, prohibiting any mention of the Georgian king and patriarch in churches under his jurisdiction and replaces members of the Georgian clergy with priests from Greece or Antioch. This split was only temporary and a severe response from the Catholicosate of Georgia forced Qvarqvare II to renounce these ambitions.

=== Revolt in the western realm ===
Modern historiography partially ignores the origins of the rebellion in western Georgia which marked the start of the Civil War. According to historians Nodar Asatiani, Kalistrat Salia and Donald Rayfield, the first signs of disagreement between King George VIII and his vassals appear in the early 1460s, when Qvarqvare II of Samtskhe decides to raise a coalition against the Ottomans, a state whose power has grown since the fall of Constantinople, but was too far from central Georgia to worry the crown of Tbilisi. Qvarqvare chooses to ally himself with Uzun Hasan, ruler of the Turkoman federation Aq Qoyunlu and occasional enemy of George VIII, to defend himself against the Ottomans. This alliance fails to prevent the fall of the last Byzantine stronghold, Empire of Trebizond, in 1461, and Uzun Hasan would prove himself to be a dangerous ally by organizing a military raid against Samtskhe itself killing Orthodox priests, devastating some villages and defeating troops of King George VIII.

Despite the failure of this alliance, relations between Tbilisi and Samtskhe are not reestablished. The Duchy of Samokalako, which supports the anti-Ottoman coalition, is suppressed by the central government, which is the starting point of the military conflict. However, according to French historian Marie-Félicité Brosset and Prince Vakhushti of Kartli, the revolt that began in 1462 had a hidden origin. He imputes it to Qvarqvare II, close to George VIII, but who takes advantage of the royal ambitions of the young Duke Bagrat to advance his projects. Bagrat, ruling Imereti in the name of the king since 1455, was a Bagrationi royal prince and a close cousin of George VIII, would surprise the king by his revolt.

Bagrat, reinforced by the support of Samtskhe, allied with the powerful Liparit I of Mingrelia and Mamia II of Guria, as well as the rulers of Abkhazia and Svaneti. Thanks to this military aid, Bagrat would succeed in conquering the royal fortresses of George VIII across western Georgia and in receiving the allegiance of many petty nobles, including in Kartli, the region around the royal capital of Tbilisi. In 1462 (or 1463), George VIII and his royal forces crossed the mountains of the Likhi range and invaded Imereti to restore the royal authority in the kingdom. Qvarqvare II would lead a military legion in Imereti but would remain strategically out of the conflict. George VIII and his army would clash with rebel forces commanded by Bagrat, near the village of Chhikhori, east of Kutaisi. Bagrat would win a decisive battle, forcing George VIII to return to Kartli.

While Kutaisi, the regional capital, remains temporarily under the control of George VIII, Bagrat would eventually take the city and at the Gelati Monastery he would be crowned as King of Imereti and assume the title of Bagrat II, officially separating the regions west of Likhi Range from the rest of the unified Georgian monarchy. The Dukes of Mingrelia, Guria, Abkhazia and Svaneti, who attended the coronation, would pledge allegiance to a new monarch, who would elevate these dukes into Mtavari princes and exempting them from any fiscal obligation. This would transform Western Georgia into a federation of principalities which will only weaken through the centuries.

=== Domination of Samtskhe ===
Jaqeli family of Samtskhe would benefit greatly from the war between the western and eastern halves of the Georgian kingdom and would form a large autonomy, under the rule of Qvarqvare II. He would even begin to take the title of Mepe (მეფე, i.e. "king") and launched his own series of coins with a manufacturing workshop based in his capital, Akhaltsikhe. King George VIII would invade Samtskhe in 1463 and succeed in defeating Qvarqvare, all his vassal nobles siding with a Georgian monarch.

Following his defeat, Qvarvare II takes refuge with Bagrat, the new king of Western Georgia, controlling Imereti. The latter authorizes the fallen prince to use his troops and an army of Imereti and gets Samtskhe back from the hands of George VIII the same year. Back in power in Akhaltsikhe, Qvarqvare decides to take revenge on his vassals who sided with the central royal government during the invasion and, with the blessing of Bagrat, forms an alliance with Prince Kakhaber II of Guria. Supported by mercenaries from Imereti and Guria, Qvarqvare II crosses Samtskhe and the northern province of Klarjeti, forcing the submission of the fortresses of these regions. While some nobles swear allegiance to the prince, many are executed and others go into exile, including Zaza Panaskerteli-Tsitsishvili, who becomes advisor to King George VIII. As a token of thanks, Kakheber II receives the territories of Adjara and Lazeti.

In 1465, George VIII decided to engage in a new invasion of Samtskhe to restore unity. Having the military advantage over the prince, he offers Qvarqvare II a peace negotiation, guaranteeing the survival of the Jaqeli family in exchange for the return of rebel territories within the kingdom. Following the prince's refusal, George VIII inflicts a new defeat on Qvarvqvare during a battle at Lake Paravani, which leads to a final resistance from the prince's guards, who would manage to defeat the royal entourage and by taking George VIII as a hostage. Imprisoned, George VIII remains the king of Georgia but is obliged to recognize the independence of Samtskhe and marry Tamar Jaqeli, daughter of Qvarqvare, despite the fact that he was already married.

=== New royal power ===
Bagrat decides to attack Kartli. In 1466, without notable opposition, Bagrat captured Tbilisi and took hostage the patriarch of the Georgian Church, David IV. The latter agrees to recognize the domination of the Imeretian sovereign. Bagrat is then crowned as Bagrat VI, king of all Georgia. Samtskhe was not very happy with this new unity and, the same year, Qvarqvare II frees the former king George VIII from his prison, in order to sow chaos in the kingdom. George VIII received the leadership of a militia which crossed central Georgia and established itself in the eastern province of Kakheti. In 1467, George received the submission of the local nobles and proclaimed the independence of the Kingdom of Kakheti, dividing Georgia into two independent kingdoms.

=== Coup d'état ===
The chaotic situation in Georgian politics is greatly aggravated by a ceasefire offer between Bagrat VI and Prince Constantine, who proclaims himself King of Georgia. The cease-fire, allows Constantine to become the official heir of Bagrat VI in Kartli, while western Georgia is promised to Prince Alexander, son of Bagrat. This agreement only slightly eased the conflict and military clashes resumed between the two kings in the 1470s. At the end of this decade, Bagrat VI managed to decisively defeat Constantine with the help of reinforcements from Mingrelia and Guria.

In 1478 Bagrat VI dies, inaugurating a last series of conflicts between the Georgian rulers. Alexander, son of Bagrat then tries to be crowned in Kutaisi as ruler of Western Georgia, but his coronation is boycotted by his vassals, who would refuse to recognize him as heir. Constantine, who reigns in Kartli as Constantine II, then invades Imereti, inflicting serious defeat on Alexander, who loses his crown and is forced to accept simple governance of the mountain regions of Racha and Lechkhumi.

During this time, George VIII confronts Constantine II in Kartli, before being defeated thanks to the military support of Samtskhe. He died in 1476 and was replaced by his son, Alexander I of Kakheti. The latter makes no claim to the "all-Georgian" crown and negotiates borders with Tbilisi, sparing his kingdom from a possible invasion by Constantine II; he embarked on an independent foreign policy, sending embassies to Grand Duchy of Moscow.

== Fragmentation of the church ==
The collapse of the unified royal institution impacted the administration of the Georgian Orthodox Church. Samtskhe under Qvarqvare II Jaqeli and Mzetchabuk Jaqeli actively fought for separation from its Church. Weakening of the church in the Southern Georgian lands would result in gradual Islamization of the Meskhetians.

In Western Georgia, King Bagrat mildly supported the separation as well. The spiritual jurisdiction of the new Catholicos of western Georgia would extend beyond the Kingdom of Imereti to the principalities of Guria, Mingrelia, Svaneti and Abkhazia until its annexation by the Russian Empire.

== 1490 royal council ==
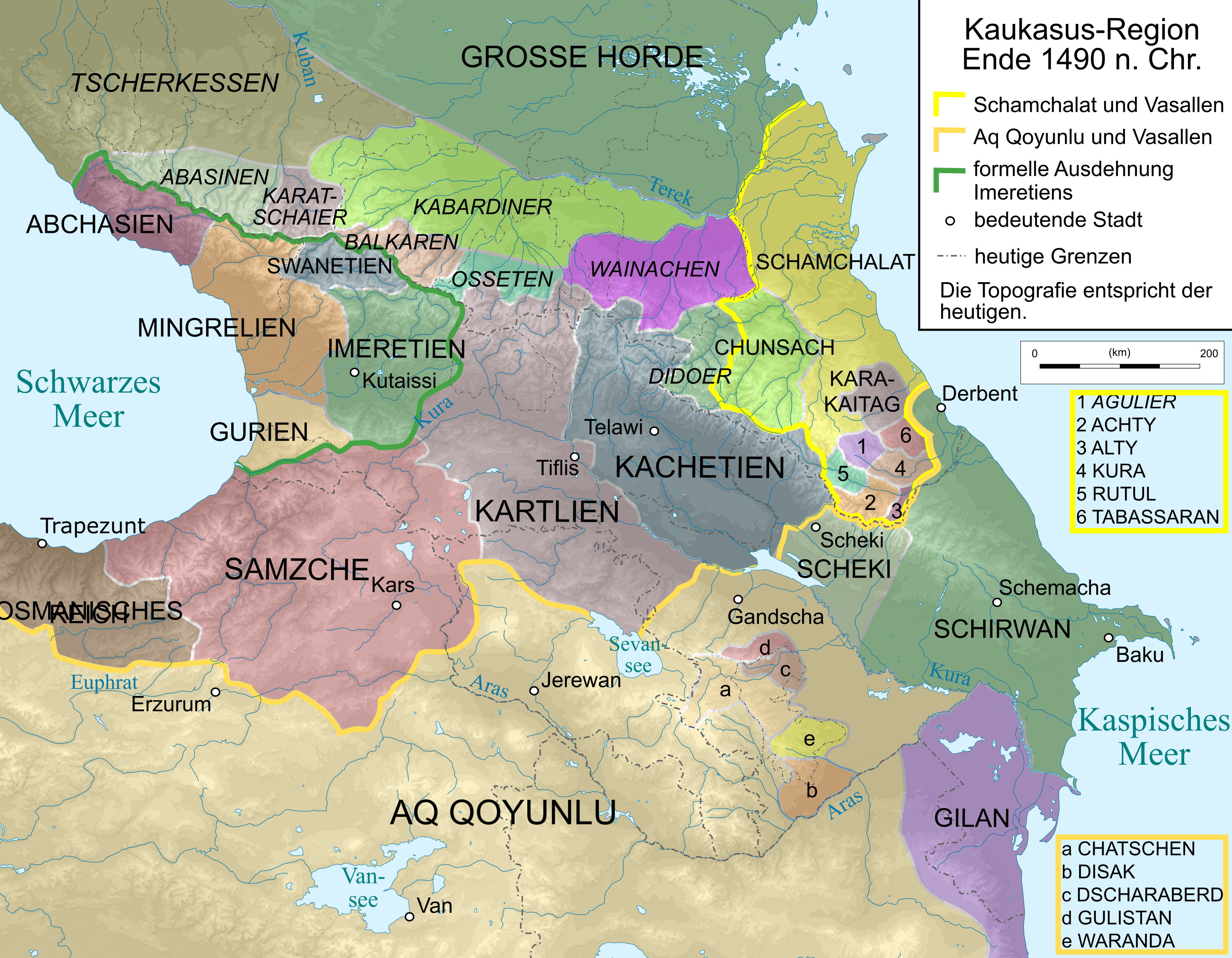
Georgia after an official collapse in 1490.

In 1490, King Constantine II faced one of the biggest decisions in Georgian history. He invited the darbazi, the royal council charged since the 13th century with assisting the Georgian sovereign during important decisions. The council, made up of the top clergy of the Georgian Orthodox Church, six royal ministers and representatives of the largest ducal and noble Georgian families, was a legislative body headed by the king. The unanimous decision of the Darbazi of 1490 was then to accept the official division of the kingdom of Georgia, a kingdom unified 482 years earlier by Bagrat III of Georgia, into three kingdoms and one principality: the kingdoms of Kartli, Kakheti, Imereti and the principality of Samtskhe.

Following the decision of royal darbazi, Constantine II negotiated peace treaties in 1491 with Alexander I of Kakheti, Qvarqvare II and Alexander II of Imereti. Georgia officially collapsed and became a nation of three kingdoms and one major principality, a situation that continued until the early 19th century, eventually being annexed by the Russian Empire in a piecemeal fashion.

== See also ==
- Feudal fragmentation
- Style of the Georgian sovereign
- Unification of the Kingdom of Georgia

== Bibliography ==
- Rayfield, D. (2012) Edge of Empires, a History of Georgia, London, Reaktion Books, ISBN 9781780230702
- Brosset, M. (1856) Histoire de la Géorgie, depuis l'Antiquité jusqu'au xixe siècle - 2ème partie, Saint-Petersburg, Académie impériale des Sciences
- Salia, K. (1980) Histoire de la nation géorgienne, Paris
- Toumanoff, C. (1990) Les dynasties de la Caucasie chrétienne de l'Antiquité jusqu'au xixe siècle: Tables généalogiques et chronologiques, Rome
- Toumanoff, C. (1951) The Fifteenth-Century Bagratids and the Institution of Collegial Sovereignty in Georgia, Traditio, Cambridge University Press, Vol. 7
- Asatiani N. & Janelidze, O. (2009) History of Georgia, Tbilisi, Publishing House Petite,. ISBN 978-9941-9063-6-7
- Asatiani N., Otkhmezuri, G. et al. (2012) Histoire de la Géorgie du XIIIe au XIXe siècles, vol. 3, Tbilisi, Palitra, 2012, ISBN 978-9941-19-407-8
