= Alexander I of Georgia =

King of Georgia from 1412 to 1442

Alexander I the Great ალექსანდრე I დიდი
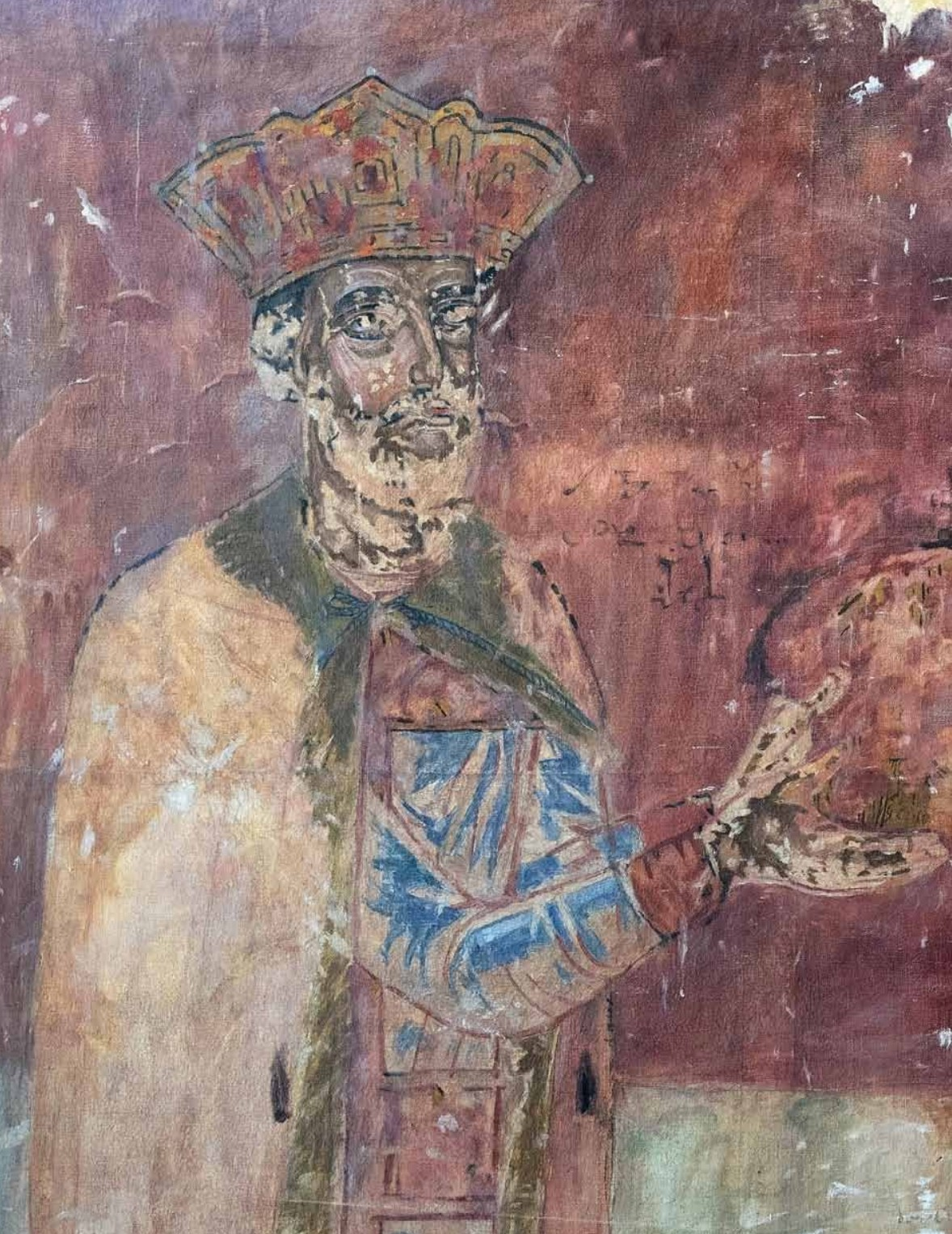
- Fresco of King Alexander I from the Svetitskhoveli Cathedral.

King of Georgia
- Reign: 1412–1442
- Predecessor: Constantine I
- Successor: Vakhtang IV
- Co-kings: Vakhtang (1433–1442); Demetrius (1433–1442); George (1433–1442); Zaal (1433–1442)
- Born: 1390
- Died: between August 26, 1445 and March 7, 1446
- Burial: Svetitskhoveli Cathedral, Mtskheta
- Spouse: Dulandukht Orbelian; Tamar of Imereti
- Issue: Unnamed daughter; Vakhtang IV; Prince Demetrius; George VIII; David, Catholicos-Patriarch; Prince Zaal
Names
- Alexander I the Great; Aleksandre I Didi; Athanasius (monastic name)
- Dynasty: Bagrationi
- Father: Constantine I of Georgia
- Mother: Natia Amirejibi
- Religion: Georgian Orthodox Church
- Khelrtva

Alexander I the Great (Georgian: ალექსანდრე I დიდი; born 1390 – died between 26 August 1445 and 7 March 1446), of the Bagrationi dynasty, was king (mepe) of Georgia from 1412 to 1442. His reign was marked by extensive reconstruction and building projects, as well as military conflicts with neighbouring nomadic states. Alexander's decision to divide the administration of the kingdom among his three sons played a role in the eventual disintegration of the Georgian kingdom. In 1442, Alexander abdicated the throne and retired to a monastery.

== Biography ==
=== Accession and early reign ===
Alexander was the eldest son of Constantine I of Georgia and his wife, Princess Natia Amirejibi, the daughter of the Georgian nobleman and diplomat Kutsna Amirejibi. He was raised by his grandmother (Natia's mother), Rusa (died 1413), an educated and religious noblewoman who greatly influenced the future king's interests and his enthusiasm for religious construction.

At the beginning of his reign, Alexander was compelled to engage in military campaigns against the Turkmen forces, which he successfully repelled. According to his own account: "I began to wage war against the infidels and drove them from our borders, thereby bringing great peace and tranquillity to the Christians."

The foremost concern of the Georgian government was the restoration of internal unity, which had been severely undermined by prolonged warfare and political instability.

In 1414, Alexander led a military expedition into Western Georgia in order to reassert royal authority over the autonomous regional rulers. Mamia II Dadiani, Duke of Mingrelia, had attempted to bring the Duchy of Abkhazia under his control and invaded its territory. However, his forces were defeated by the Abkhazian ruler, Sharvashidze, and Mamia himself was killed. Upon arriving in Mingrelia, Alexander appointed Liparit, Mamia's son, as his father's successor. Liparit sought the king's forgiveness for his father's actions. The ruler of Abkhazia likewise acknowledged Alexander's authority when the king arrived in the duchy.

In the same year, or possibly in 1415, Ivane II Jaqeli, the Atabeg of Samtskhe, assembled an army against the king and launched a rebellion. Alexander defeated the rebellious nobleman at Kokhta Fortress and captured him. The king subsequently entered Samtskhe, seized its fortresses, expelled those who resisted his authority, dispossessed certain nobles, and appointed his own loyal officials in their place. Ivane Jaqeli eventually sought forgiveness and swore an oath of allegiance to the king. Alexander pardoned him and returned to Tbilisi.

These events illustrate the political fragmentation characteristic of the period, during which increasingly powerful regional rulers were prepared to wage war against the monarch in order to preserve their autonomy. Alexander's response is also significant: he sought to reassert central authority through military intervention, the punishment and removal of rebellious nobles, and the appointment of loyal officials in their territories. Some recalcitrant nobles were expelled from the kingdom, while others were permanently deprived of their hereditary offices and replaced by royal appointees.

=== Foreign Relations ===
Kingdom of Georgia with Lori and Syunik

According to Georgian and Armenian historical sources, in 1416 the Turkoman forces under the command of Qara Yusuf invaded and plundered Akhaltsikhe. The attackers reportedly received assistance from the city's local Muslim inhabitants. According to an Armenian account, the pretext for the invasion was an incident involving a Persian convert to Christianity who had allegedly thrown bones from pork into a mosque. Outraged by this act, the local Muslims appealed to Qara Yusuf, who used the incident as a justification for plundering the city.

Alexander firmly embarked upon the recovery of territories seized by the Turkomans. At the time, Georgia's southern frontiers had contracted considerably compared with their extent under Bagrat V. Territories such as Khachen, Ani, and the strategically important region of Lori were no longer under Georgian control. The loss of Lori was particularly significant, as the region was of considerable importance for the defence of Georgia's southern frontier.

In 1431, King Alexander recaptured Lori by military force. Some details concerning its recovery are recorded in a royal charter issued by Alexander in 1434. According to this document, Catholicos-Patriarch Theodore played a prominent role in the campaign, reportedly delivering a patriotic speech to the Georgian troops before the battle.

The charter states that, following the recapture of the fortress of Lori and its approaches from the "seizing Agarians" (a historical term referring to Muslims), the surrounding lands were redistributed by the central royal authority. Former Georgian landholders were restored to their previous possessions, while additional estates were granted to individuals who had not previously held property in the region. Among the latter beneficiaries was Catholicos Theodore, who received a village in recognition of his contribution.

Following the recapture of Lori, around 1435, Alexander encouraged the Armenian prince Beshken II Orbelian to launch a campaign against the Qara Qoyunlu tribesmen in Syunik. Following his victory, Alexander granted Beshken control of Lori on terms of vassalage.

=== Reconstruction of the Kingdom ===
A royal charter issued by King Alexander

The reign of Alexander I was marked by efforts to restore the country's agricultural and economic infrastructure, as well as the reconstruction of fortresses and churches destroyed during Timur's invasions. At the beginning of his reign, numerous buildings throughout Georgia lay in ruins. Alexander himself reported that the churches, monasteries, and fortresses of Georgia had been completely destroyed from their foundations by Timur.

To finance the reconstruction, the royal government introduced a special temporary tax levied on each household throughout Georgia in 1425. The revenue was intended to fund an extensive programme of construction and restoration. By 1440, the planned works had reportedly been completed, and the temporary tax was subsequently abolished. Although the programme appears to have been extensive, the surviving sources provide little information about the specific fortresses, churches, and other sites involved. Notable examples included the restoration of Svetitskhoveli Cathedral, completed in 1431, and Ruisi Cathedral.

Alongside these reconstruction efforts, Alexander sought to strengthen the country's economy by resettling abandoned and depopulated areas. Owing to the decline in the lowland population, he encouraged peasants from the mountainous regions to settle in the lowlands and provided them with financial assistance for the construction of houses. He also sought to attract settlers from foreign countries. During his reign, Armenian refugees and other Christian populations from Muslim-ruled countries settled in Georgia, where they found both security and land on which to sustain themselves.

=== Succession and Co-Kingship ===
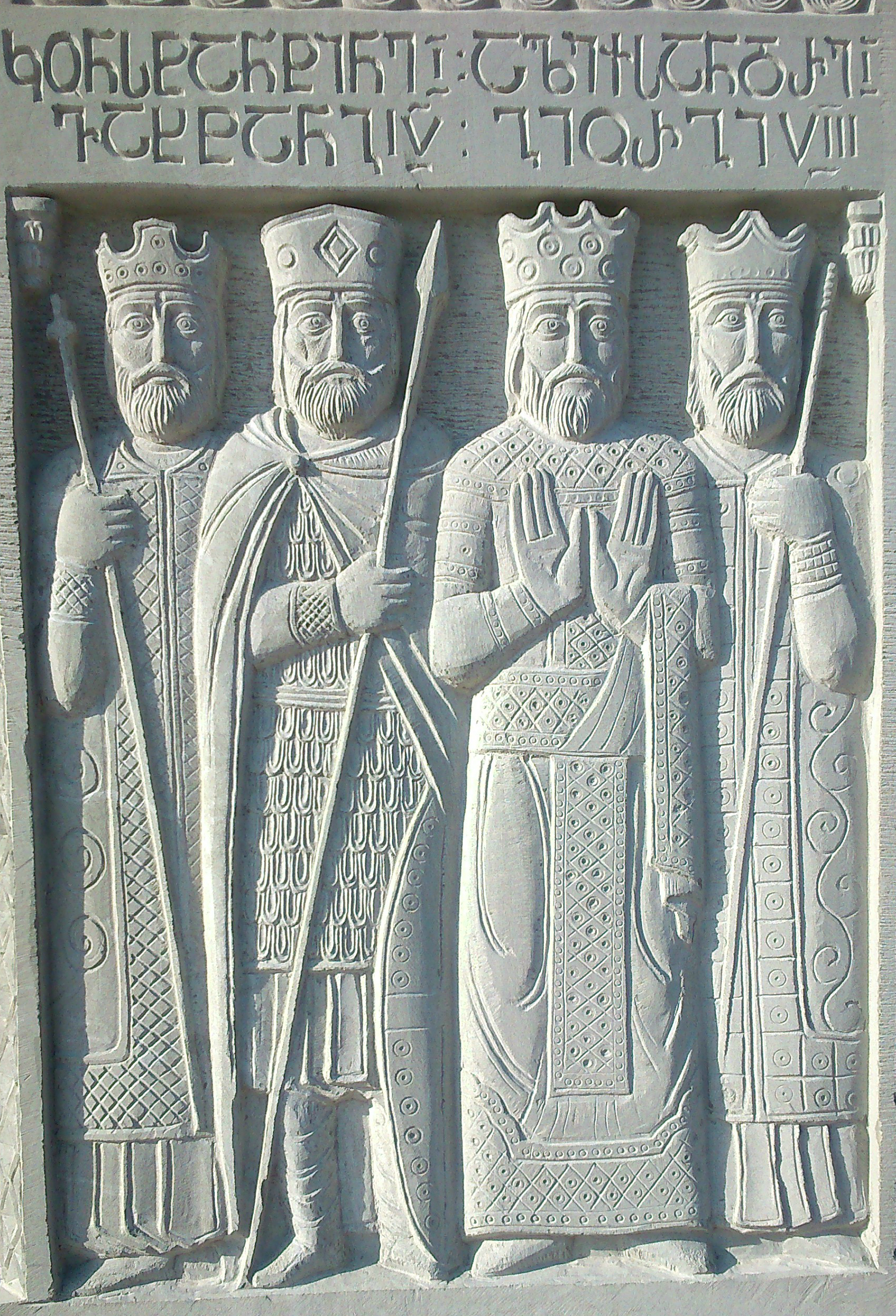
Constantine I (his father), Alexander I, Vakhtang IV (his son), and George VIII (his son)

In 1433, King Alexander I of Georgia appointed his three sons, Demetrius, Vakhtang, and George, as co-kings. The decision was intended to strengthen royal authority over the kingdom's provinces and secure the succession, following the Byzantine practice of appointing heirs to the imperial throne as co-emperors. Although Alexander sought to accommodate the claims of all his sons while preserving the unity of the kingdom, the arrangement ultimately had the opposite effect. Rather than preventing dynastic rivalries, it contributed to the weakening of central authority and, after his death, to the eventual disintegration of the kingdom.

=== Final Years and Abdication ===
In 1440, Jahan Shah of the Kara Koyunlu arrived at the borders of Georgia and demanded that Alexander I submit voluntarily and agree to pay tribute. Alexander refused, prompting Jahan Shah to invade the kingdom. According to the detailed account of the Armenian chronicler Thomas of Metsoph, the invasion took place on Easter Day. As the attack was unexpected, the Georgians were unprepared and had difficulty assembling an army. Jahan Shah captured the town of Samshvilde and massacred its inhabitants. He then advanced towards Tbilisi, captured the city and subjected it to extensive looting before withdrawing from Georgia.

In 1442, Alexander abdicated the throne and became a monk under the name Athanasius at Mtskheta. He was succeeded by his eldest son, Vakhtang IV of Georgia. Alexander died in 1445 or 1446.

== Marriages and children ==
He married Dulandukht, daughter of Beshken II Orbelian, around 1411. They had two sons and one daughter:

- A daughter (c. 1411 – c. 1438), who married Emperor John IV of Trebizond in 1425;
- Vakhtang IV (c. 1413 – 1446), King of Georgia (r. 1442–1446);
- Demetrius (c. 1413 – 1453), co-ruler of Imereti and father of Constantine II of Georgia.

Alexander's second marriage, to Princess Tamar of Imereti (died after 1455), daughter of Alexander I of Imereti, took place around 1414. They had three children:

- George VIII (1415/1417 – 1476), King of Georgia (r. 1446–1465) and the first King of Kakheti (r. 1466–1476);
- David, Catholicos-Patriarch of Georgia, consecrated in 1426;
- Zaal (born c. 1428 – died after 1442), whom his father appointed co-king in 1433.

== Legacy ==
Alexander I is regarded as an important figure in medieval Georgian history. The historian Ivane Javakhishvili assessed his reign favourably, emphasising the king's efforts to restore and strengthen the Georgian kingdom. Nevertheless, Javakhishvili noted that royal authority weakened towards the end of Alexander's reign, partly as a result of the introduction of co-kingship. Some historians, however, argue that the fragmentation of the Georgian kingdom was inevitable and that Alexander's decision to introduce co-kingship merely accelerated the process.

== See also ==
- History of Georgia
- Turkoman invasions of Georgia

== Bibliography ==
- Salia, Kalistrat (1980). Histoire de la nation géorgienne (in French). Paris: Éditions Nino Salia.
- Vachnadze, Merab (1979). Essays on the History of Georgia (in Georgian). Vol. 3. Tbilisi: Soviet Georgia.
- Javakhishvili, Ivane (1982). History of the Georgian Nation (in Georgian). Vol. 3. Tbilisi: Tbilisi State University Press.
- Berdzenishvili, Niko (1965). Studies in the History of Georgia (in Georgian). Vol. 2. Tbilisi: Metsniereba.
- Lominadze, Babilina (1979). "Georgia in the First Half of the Fifteenth Century: Measures for the Restoration of the Country". Essays on the History of Georgia (in Georgian). Vol. 3. Tbilisi: Soviet Georgia.
- Suny, Ronald Grigor (1994). The Making of the Georgian Nation (2nd ed.). Bloomington: Indiana University Press. ISBN 0-253-20915-3.
- Sanikidze, Levan (1991). Unsharpened Swords (in Georgian). Vol. 2. Tbilisi: Merani. ISBN 978-9941-32-859-6.

Preceded by Constantine I	King of Georgia; 1412–1442	Succeeded by Vakhtang IV
