= Kantha (disambiguation) =

Kantha is a type of embroidery typical of eastern South Asia.

Kantha may also refer to:

- Kantha, Amarapura
- Kantha, Bhamo
- Kantha, Kale
- Kantha (film), a 2013 Indian Tamil-language drama film

== See also ==
- Banas Kantha (disambiguation)
- Kanta (disambiguation)
