= Zaal (son of Alexander I of Georgia) =

Georgian royal prince

- Born: 1428
- Died: 1442 (aged 13–14)
- Dynasty: Bagrationi
- Father: Alexander I of Georgia
- Mother: Tamar of Imereti

Zaal (Georgian: ზაალი, romanized: zaali) (born c.1428 – died after 1442) was a Georgian royal prince (batonishvili) of the Bagrationi dynasty.

The youngest son of Alexander I of Georgia and his second wife Tamar. He was the co-king with his father in 1433. Zaal was the brother of George VIII and Vakhtang IV.

He died in 1442, at the age of 14.

His name "Zaal" is derived from the Persian Zāl, a name of the legendary king and warrior from Ferdowsi's Shahnameh.

== Sources ==
- Cyrille Toumanoff, Les dynasties de la Caucasie chrétienne de l'Antiquité jusqu'au XIXe siècle: Tables généalogiques et chronologiques, Rome, 1990, p. 139-140.
