= Demetrius (son of Alexander I of Georgia) =

King of Imereti

Co-King of Georgia
- Reign: 1433–1446
- With: Alexander I (1433–1442); Vakhtang IV (1442–1446)
- Born: c. 1413
- Died: 1452 or 1453
- Spouse: Gulashar
- Issue: Constantine II of Georgia
- Dynasty: Bagrationi
- Father: Alexander I of Georgia
- Mother: Dulandukht Orbelian
- Religion: Georgian Orthodox Church
- Khelrtva

Demetrius (Georgian: დიმიტრი, romanized: dimit'ri; c. 1413 – 1453), also known as Demetrius III, was the second son of Alexander I of Georgia by his first wife Dulandukht Orbelian. He was co-king with his father from 1433 to 1442 and with his brother Vakhtang IV from 1442 to 1446. On Vakhtang's death, Demetrius became a de jure king of Georgia but his accession to the throne was precluded by his younger brother George VIII.

== Biography ==
Demetrius first appears in the charter dated to 1413. Traditional Georgian historiography founded by Prince Vakhushti in the 18th century erroneously makes him a younger brother of George VIII and frequently omits him from the list of the kings of Georgia. Demetrius was co-opted by his father Alexander I in 1433. He was sent by him as ambassador to Shah Rukh, son of Timur.

After Alexander I's renouncement of the throne in 1442 in favor of Vakhtang IV, Demetrius remained a co-king with the latter, whereas Alexander's third son, George VIII, was made a co-king appanaged in Kakheti. Upon the death of Vakhtang IV in 1446, Demetrius III was to become de jure king-regnant of Georgia, but the throne was seized by George VIII, inaugurating a series of conflicts which would eventually lead to the dissolution of the kingdom of Georgia by the close of the 15th century. Demetrius retired to the western province of Imereti. He was killed by a horse while hunting in 1453 (or 1452).

== Family ==
Demetrius married Queen Gulashar after 1446. Nothing is known about her origin. (Note: Historian Marie-Félicité Brosset attempted to identify Queen Gulashar with Queen Gulkan, whose death is recorded in the Georgian Chronicle under the year 1471. He was unaware of the existence of the 1475 charter mentioning Gulashar. Queen Gulkan must therefore have been a different person, perhaps the consort of one of King Alexander I's brothers.) She is last attested in a charter dated 1475. They had one son:

- Constantine II of Georgia (1447–1505), last king of the Kingdom of Georgia (r. 1478–1490), and the first king of Kartli (r. 1490–1505);

The historian Prince Vakhushti claims that Demetrius had another son, David, who was installed as king in Kakheti in 1465 by the local nobility and founded the dynasty of the kings of Kakheti. Vakhushti makes David the father of George, king of Kakheti, whom he differentiates from George VIII, Demetrius's younger brother, at first king of Georgia and then king of Kakheti. The David of Vakhushti is, however, a fictitious figure.

== Sources ==
- Toumanoff, Cyril (1949–1951). "The Fifteenth-Century Bagratids and the Institution of Collegial Sovereignty in Georgia". Traditio. 7: 169–221. doi:10.1017/S0362152900015142. JSTOR 27830207.

Demetrius (son of Alexander I of Georgia) Bagrationi dynasty Born: c. 1413 Died: 1453
Preceded by Alexander I	Co-King of Georgia; 1433–1446 with Alexander I (1433–1442); Vakhtang IV (1442–1446)	Succeeded by George VIII
