= George VIII =

King of Georgia (1446–1466) and Kakheti (1466–1476)

George VIII გიორგი VIII
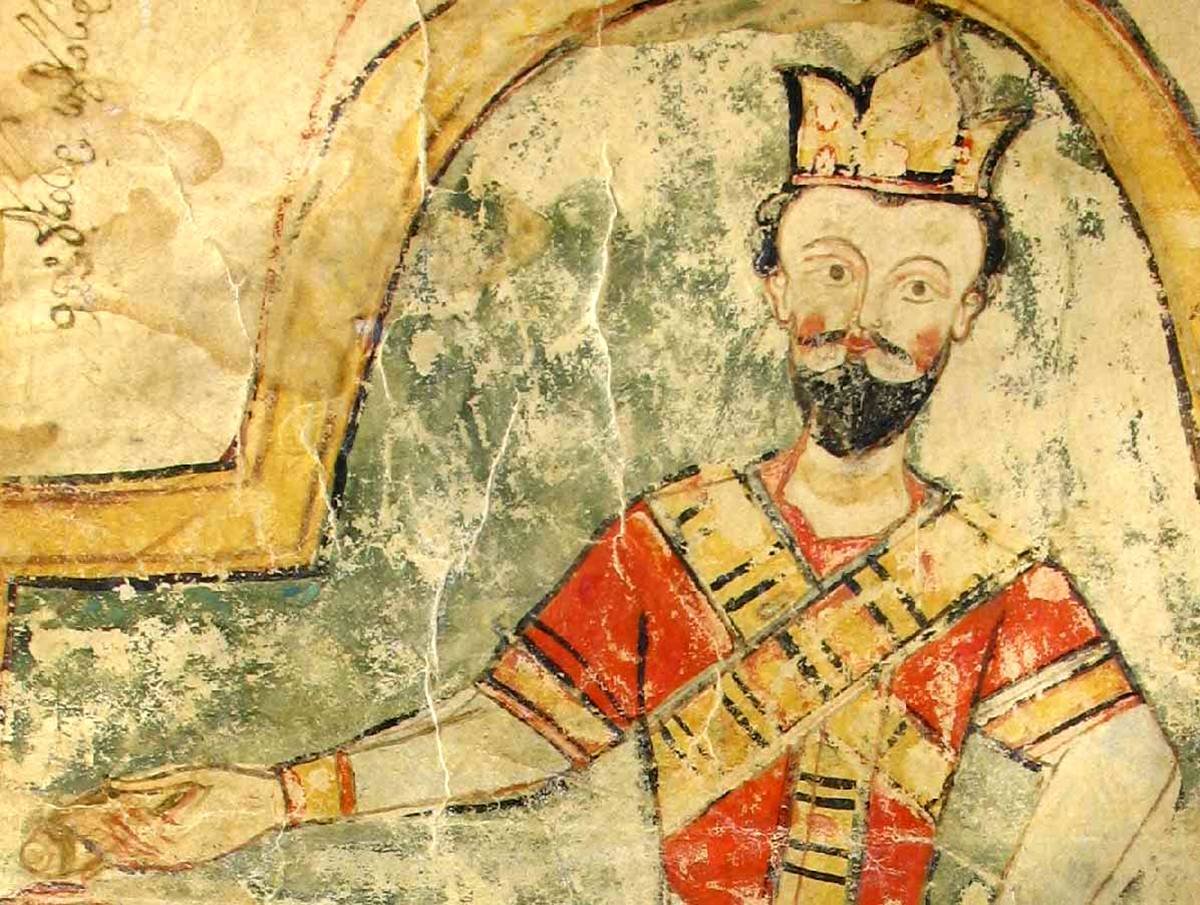
- A royal charter regarding the blood money issued by King George VIII to the priest Giorgi Zhuruli, 1460.

King of Georgia
- Reign: 1446–1466
- Predecessor: Vakhtang IV
- Successor: Bagrat VI

King of Kakheti
- Reign: 1466–1476
- Successor: Alexander I
- Born: 1415/1417
- Died: 1476
- Burial: Svetitskhoveli Cathedral
- Spouse: Tamar Jaqeli; Nestan-Darejan
- Issue Among others: Alexander I of Kakheti
- Dynasty: Bagrationi
- Father: Alexander I of Georgia
- Mother: Tamar of Imereti
- Religion: Georgian Orthodox Church
- Khelrtva

George VIII (Georgian: გიორგი VIII, romanized: giorgi VIII; 1415/1417–1476), of the Bagrationi dynasty, was the king (mepe) of the Kingdom of Georgia from 1446 to 1466 and later ruled the Kingdom of Kakheti as George I from 1466 until his death in 1476.

A member of the Bagrationi dynasty, he was the third son of Alexander I of Georgia. In 1433, Alexander appointed George as co-ruler alongside his brothers Vakhtang IV, Demetrius, and Zaal, in an attempt to strengthen the royal authority against the growing power of the nobility. However, the young George soon fell under the influence of the nobles, leading to his father's abdication in 1442. He subsequently assumed administrative control over the northeastern territories of the Caucasus under the supervision of his elder brother, Vakhtang IV. Upon Vakhtang's death in 1446, George seized the throne, disinherited his elder brother Demetrius, and forced him into exile.

George VIII is remembered as the last monarch to rule over a united Georgian kingdom, although the formal division of the realm was not recognized until 1490. During his reign, he rapidly lost control of Samtskhe in the 1460s, when the atabeg Qvarqvare II Jaqeli declared independence. Subsequently, Western Georgia broke away during the Georgian Triumvirate War, a civil conflict that marked the fragmentation of the kingdom. In 1465, George was captured and imprisoned by the atabeg of Samtskhe, leading to a further weakening of royal power and the rise of semi-independent principalities across Georgia. After his release in 1466, he established control over Kakheti, declared it an independent kingdom, and ruled there peacefully until his death in 1476, laying the foundations for its early institutions.

On the international stage, George VIII witnessed major geopolitical upheavals in the Near East, including the fall of Constantinople in 1453 and the fall of Trebizond in 1461. Despite appeals for assistance from the Byzantines, George chose not to intervene against the Ottoman Empire in either conflict. His plans to organize a crusade against the Ottomans, in cooperation with Rome, ultimately failed due to the reluctance of European states to participate in the campaign.

== Early life ==
Born between 1415 and 1417, George VIII was the third son of Alexander I of Georgia. His mother, Tamar, was Alexander's second wife and the daughter of Alexander I of Imereti, the rebellious monarch of Western Georgia.

George was educated at the royal court alongside his elder brothers Vakhtang and Demetrius, and he is recorded as a prince in documents dating from 1417. He is mentioned together with his father in royal charters issued on 29 September 1417, 22 September 1419, 6 January 1424, in 1427, and on 21 January 1428. However, certain other documents from the same period omit his name while referring to his brothers.

During George's youth, his father achieved several notable successes, including the capture of Lori in 1431. Alexander I subsequently sought to strengthen the central authority of the kingdom and extend royal influence over the Georgian Orthodox Church, preparing his son David, George's brother, to become the future Catholicos-Patriarch of All Georgia.

== Co-rulership of Georgia ==
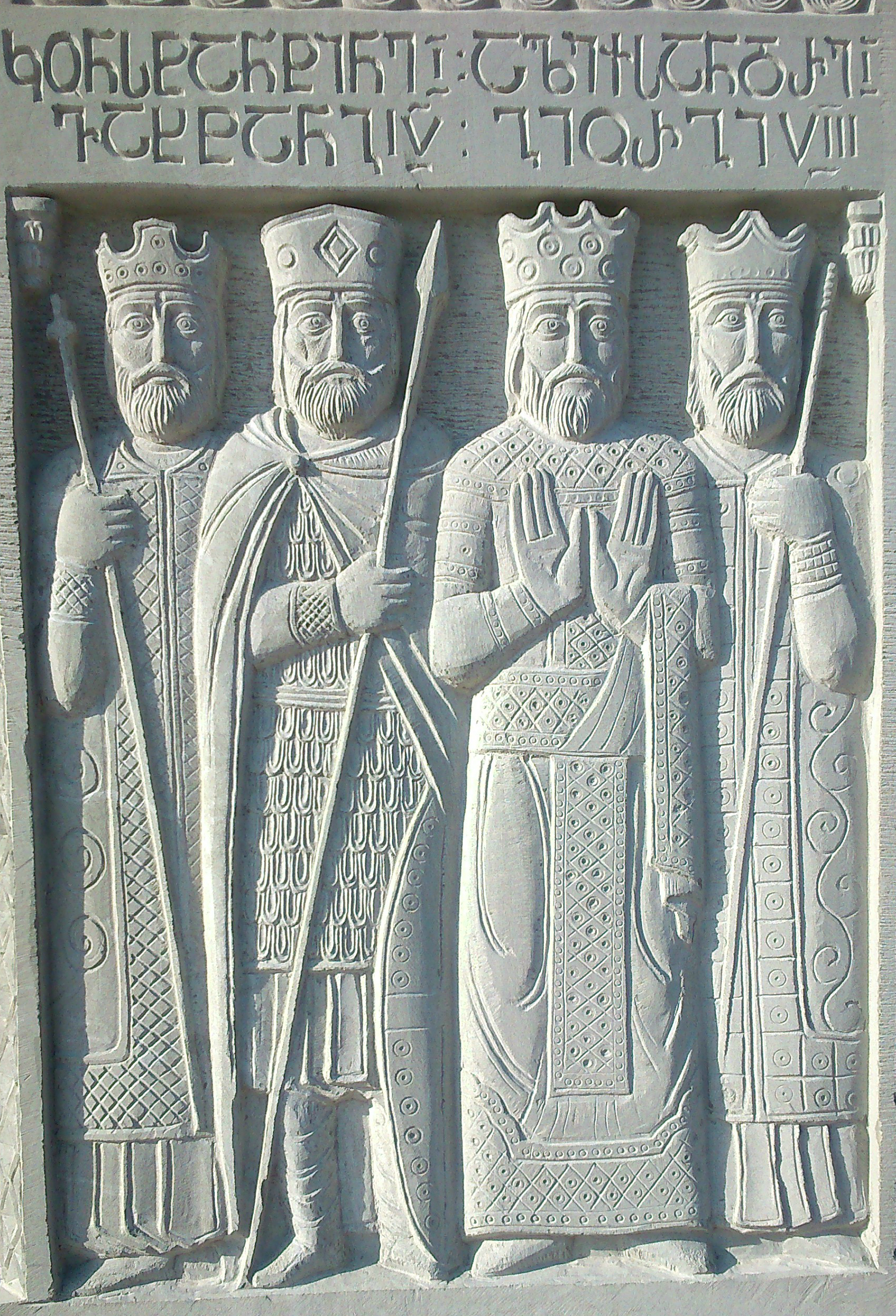
Relief of Constantine I, Alexander I, Vakhtang IV, and George VIII.

During the 1430s, Alexander I of Georgia initiated a program of royal centralization, aiming to strengthen the monarchy and suppress the great feudal lords who continued to defy royal authority. After confiscating many of their estates, he appointed his four sons — Vakhtang, Demetrius, George, and Zaal — as co-rulers in 1433. According to historian Cyril Toumanoff, Alexander was influenced by the Byzantine model of shared sovereignty, delegating administrative duties among his sons. However, this interpretation was rejected by the 18th-century chronicler Vakhushti of Kartli, who denied any deliberate imitation of Byzantine practices. Alexander also promoted the military expansion of the kingdom and the reconstruction of numerous towns that had been devastated by centuries of warfare.

Each of the co-rulers was represented in the Georgian delegation that participated in the Council of Ferrara in 1438 and the Council of Florence in 1439 — two ecumenical assemblies presided over by Pope Eugene IV. The king permitted his sons to send their representatives to these councils to balance the influence of Mingrelia and Samtskhe, both of which sought the support of Rome in their efforts to gain independence from the crown.

In 1439, Alexander I fell gravely ill, prompting his sons to assume control of the government. Although physicians expected his death, he recovered in 1440 to find that the royal court had slipped from his authority. Encouraged by the powerful nobility, divisions deepened within the royal family, and the king's sons grew increasingly independent, refusing to obey their father's commands. The disunity became evident when the royal council failed to agree on a strategy to repel the invasion of the Turcoman ruler Jahan Shah, whose forces subsequently massacred nearly two thousand Georgians.

By 1442, Alexander I could no longer maintain control over his fractious realm. After a reign of thirty years, he abdicated the throne and retired to monastic life under the name Athanasius. Before his withdrawal, he arranged the marriage of George VIII to Princess Nestan-Darejan Bagrationi, daughter of his uncle Bagrat, the son of Constantine I of Georgia. The throne was reserved for his eldest son Vakhtang IV, while the remaining brothers divided the kingdom among themselves. The youngest, Zaal, subsequently disappeared from historical records. Alexander I died in 1446.

=== Successor of Vakhtang IV ===
Following the abdication of his father Alexander I, Vakhtang IV succeeded to the throne with the title of King of Kings, which conferred seniority over his younger brothers. Demetrius and George VIII, however, continued to administer certain regions of the kingdom. The sources remain uncertain regarding their exact titles: historians Cyril Toumanoff and Donald Rayfield suggest that they may still have been styled as kings, whereas the Georgian Chronicles refer to them merely as princes (Georgian: მთავარი, romanized: mtavari). According to Vakhushti of Kartli, George VIII was not formally designated co-ruler until 1445. The Catholicos Anthony I, in his Twelfth Discourse on History, was the first to mention George as governor of a substantial portion of the kingdom under his brother's authority.

Kakheti, Hereti, and the small nations of Tchari and Kaki, Shaki — now possessed by Adji-Chalabi of Shirvan, whose capital is Shamakhi — were governed by George VIII, to whom Vakhtang IV granted not the title of king but that of mtavari.

The 19th-century Georgian prince David recorded that Vakhtang IV assigned to George the northeastern territories of the Caucasus, including Derbent on the Caspian Sea. Vakhushti of Kartli, however, described the borders of his domains differently, extending from Ciscaucasia in the north, along the Aragvi River in the west to Mount Lilo on the Iori Plateau, the Kura River in the south, and the Caspian Sea in the east. Meanwhile, Demetrius and Vakhtang IV shared control over Western Georgia and Kartli. Vakhtang IV ruled only briefly before dying childless in 1446. Under circumstances that remain obscure—possibly in accordance with the late king's will—George VIII assumed the crown and disinherited his elder brother, who was forced to retreat to Western Georgia.

The official royal chronology compiled in the 18th century nonetheless recognizes Demetrius as the legitimate monarch until 1452. Surviving royal charters indicate that George VIII's reign began on 25 December 1446.

The Georgian army, strengthened by the military reforms of Alexander I, remained a formidable force, as demonstrated by its victories over the Turcomans at the battle of Akhaltsikhe in 1444. During his diplomatic missions, the king estimated that he could muster up to seventy thousand troops — a stark contrast to two decades later, when forty thousand Turcomans devastated the kingdom. This military strength gave Georgia a significant strategic role within an Orthodox world increasingly threatened by the Ottoman Empire.

In 1451, the Byzantine diplomat George Sphrantzes visited the Georgian court seeking a bride for Emperor Constantine XI Palaiologos. The king agreed to marry his daughter to the emperor, but the negotiations became entangled in financial disagreements: while Sphrantzes requested a dowry, Georgian custom demanded a bride price, and the discussions even extended to the cession of several Byzantine towns. The proposed alliance alarmed the Ottomans, who, preparing for the siege of Constantinople, sought to eliminate potential Byzantine allies. In 1451, they launched a swift but devastating raid on the Abkhazian coast, to which the Georgians did not retaliate.

Ultimately, George agreed to provide fifty-six thousand ducats, along with jewels, fine furnishings, ceremonial robes, and an annual payment of three thousand ducats. The scale of this commitment threatened to bankrupt the Georgian treasury; however, the marriage proposal was rendered moot by the fall of Constantinople in 1453.

=== Early challenges ===
From the very beginning of his reign, George VIII faced the separatist ambitions of Georgia's major principalities, including Mingrelia, Guria, and Samtskhe, all of which had begun to pursue their own independent military and diplomatic policies. Although he was nominally sovereign over the entire Georgian realm, his actual authority was limited de facto to Kartli.

In 1447, a civil war broke out in Samtskhe when the atabeg (governor) Aghbugha II Jaqeli, who was supported by the royal court, was overthrown by his brother Qvarqvare II Jaqeli. Aghbugha fled to Tbilisi, the royal capital, where he continued to be recognized as the legitimate ruler of his province until his death in 1451. After Aghbugha's death, the king—persuaded by the "viziers" of the usurper—confirmed Qvarqvare II in his title as atabeg and officially recognized him as lord of Samtskhe. This, however, did little to ease the tension between the crown and its increasingly defiant vassal.

Qvarqvare II soon acted as a fully independent ruler, pursuing a policy of complete separation from the Georgian monarchy. He seized Vardzia and other royal estates and proclaimed the Autocephaly of the Samtskhe Orthodox Church, supported by a Greek metropolitan sent by the clergy of Jerusalem and Antioch. As a result, the names of King George VIII and the Catholicos David IV were omitted from regional prayers, and the governor elevated the bishop of Atskuri to the rank of Patriarch.

In response, the Catholicos excommunicated the priests who had supported this declaration of autocephaly and ordered a boycott of churches in Samtskhe loyal to Qvarqvare's faction. Fearing financial collapse, the bishop of Atskuri eventually renounced the separatist movement and sought reordination in Mtskheta, marking a strategic defeat for the rebels.

Around 1452 or 1453, Demetrius died in a hunting accident, leaving George VIII as the sole monarch of Georgia.

== Reign as sole monarch of Georgia ==
=== A fragile peace ===
Following the death of Demetrius, George VIII was crowned the sole King of Georgia, assuming the traditional title of "King of Kings, Suzerain and Sovereign of two thrones and kingdoms, of the Abkhazians, Iberians, Ranis, Kakhetians and Armenians, descendant of Nimrod", His coronation took place in the religious capital of Mtskheta, where the ceremony was conducted by his brother in the presence of the entire Georgian episcopate.

Upon consolidating his rule, George sought to strengthen ties with the nobility of western Georgia. In 1455, he appointed his cousin Bagrat as Duke of Samokalako, thereby granting him authority over the region of Imereti.

Early in his reign, George faced unrest in Shirvan, a Muslim province on the Caspian Sea that was nominally a vassal of the Georgian crown. The local Shirvanshah, Khalilullah I, attempted to assert independence and ceased paying tribute to Georgia. In response, the king launched a campaign into the region, besieged Qabala, and successfully restored Shirvan to Georgian suzerainty, forcing the resumption of tribute payments.

In 1456, Uzun Hasan, the Turcoman leader of the Aq Qoyunlu, invaded Georgia. His forces ravaged Somkhiti and laid siege to the fortress of Orbeti. The local governor avoided destruction by submitting to Uzun Hasan and aiding his raids throughout the kingdom. The Turcoman warlord then advanced into Kartli, devastated the region, and occupied the town of Mukhrani before withdrawing to his domains.

=== Preparations for a Crusade ===
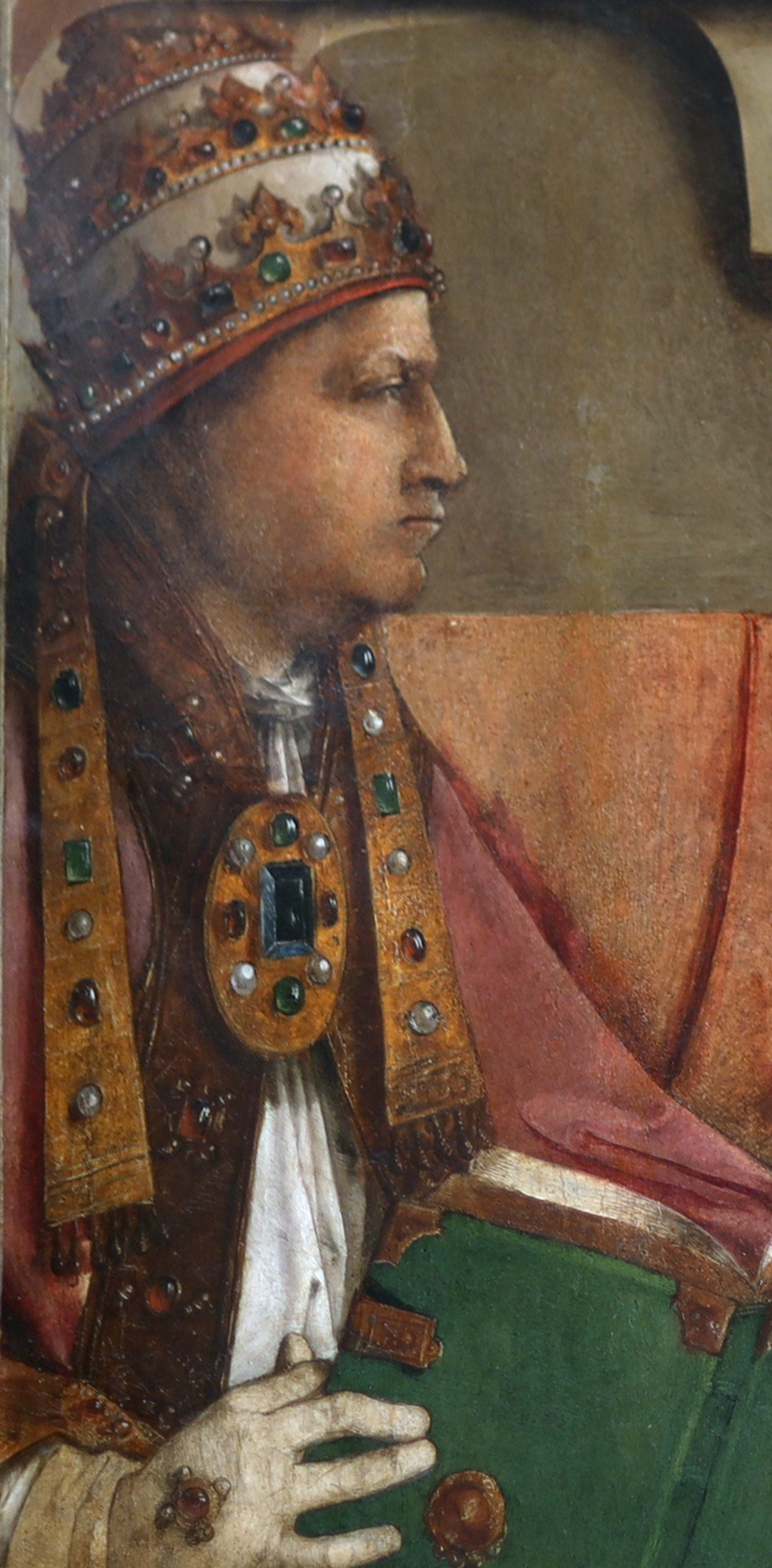
Pope Pius II supported the crusade project.

The fall of Constantinople isolated Georgia from any direct contact with Europe. The Europeans, in turn, faced a new geopolitical reality: the rise to power of the Ottoman sultan Mehmed II could create a new common enemy for the Catholics of the West. This drastic change in the regional balance compelled various Georgian nobles and rulers to form an apparent unity. In 1459, an armistice was signed between the Crown and Samtskhe. The king then saw an opportunity to react against the Muslim world and to establish himself as the center of a potential crusade.

In 1452, Pope Nicholas V embarked on a project to reconquer Constantinople, but his death in April 1455 put an end to these plans. In 1456, Ludovico da Bologna, apostolic nuncio of the new Pope Callixtus III, arrived in Georgia to prepare a detailed report for Rome on the kingdom and the Georgian Orthodox Church. He praised the piety of its inhabitants but also emphasized the grave situation caused by ongoing civil conflicts in the region. Following this report, the Holy See requested that George VIII send an embassy to Europe, and in September 1459 the successor of Callixtus III, Pope Pius II, issued a public call for a new crusade against the Ottomans. Beginning in November, regular correspondence was established between the king, Qvarqvare II, Pius II, the Doge of Venice Pasquale Malipiero, and Duke Philip III of Burgundy.

The Georgians expected to mobilize a total of 120,000 soldiers (or 140,000 according to some sources) for this crusade: forty thousand Georgians, thirty thousand Trapezuntines (then under Georgian protection), twenty thousand Armenians, twenty thousand from Samtskhe, and ten thousand Mingrelians. Additional contributions were anticipated from Guria, along with thirty ships from the port of Anacopia and a contingent from Uzun Hasan, who claimed the Ottoman city of Bursa. The king also organized a plan for this potential campaign: Georgian forces would invade Anatolia, with a contingent under Qvarqvare II advancing as far as Palestine, while the Europeans would open another front in Greece.

In 1460, a large embassy composed of Georgians, Armenians, Trapezuntines, and Persians—led by Bishop Nicholas of Tbilisi and Qartchijan of Mingrelia—arrived in Europe and met with Frederick III of Habsburg, Emperor of the Holy Roman Empire, in Vienna. In Venice, the delegation was received by the Senate of the Serenissima before continuing to Florence to attend an ecclesiastical council. In Rome, they were granted an audience with Pope Pius II in December 1460. The pontiff mistakenly referred to George VIII as the "King of the Persians" and to Duke Bagrat of Samokalako as the "King of the Iberians". From Rome, the pope dispatched the embassy across Europe in an effort to secure military support for the proposed crusade.

In May 1461, the delegation arrived in Paris to meet King Charles VII of France, who, due to illness, was unable to make any significant decision on the matter. In Saint-Omer, they held talks with Philip III of Burgundy, who hesitated to join the crusade for fear of jeopardizing his duchy during his absence. In Ghent, the ambassadors met with representatives of the Burgundian nobility but failed to convince them of the advantages of the campaign. On August 15, they returned to Paris to attend the coronation of Louis XI of France, who declined to undertake any military expedition owing to pressing internal difficulties.

The crusade project ultimately failed after the Western monarchs refused to participate. As the Georgian-led embassy departed from Europe, its members are said to have declared:

Because the favorable moment has been lost, Europe will one day see the Turks at the gates of Vienna.

=== Fall of Trebizond ===
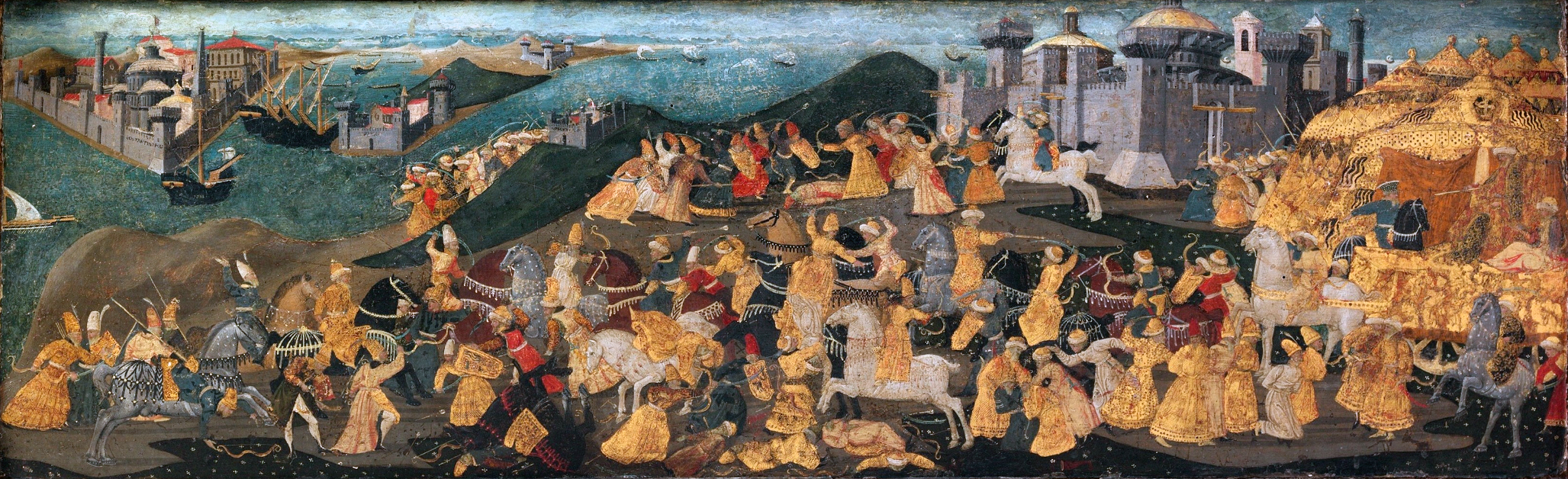
Cassone with the "Conquest of Trebizond" by Apollonio di Giovanni di Tommaso.

The neighboring Empire of Trebizond was the last stronghold of Byzantine civilization after the fall of Constantinople. Founded in 1204 with the support of Queen Tamar of Georgia, an ancestor of George VIII, this Black Sea state had long been one of Georgia's closest allies. Emperor John IV Megas Komnenos, who married the daughter of Alexander I, had lived at the Georgian court after attempting to usurp his father's throne in 1426. In his communications with Europe, King George VIII also promised a military contingent from Trebizond to participate in the projected crusade.

This close alliance aroused the hostility of Mehmed II, the conqueror of Constantinople. Fearing that his city might share the same fate, John IV sought military assistance from Georgia. The Ottomans, however, recognized that Trebizond was well protected by a complex system of fortifications and that an allied fleet might come to its defense. Konstantin Mihailović, who served in the Ottoman army, later recounted the sultan's incursion into Georgia—an attempt to intimidate its ruler and prevent him from aiding the Trapezuntines. The Turkish forces advanced along the Rioni River and through the mountains of Ciscaucasia, signaling a probable attack on Kutaisi.

On 14 September 1460, while the Georgian embassy was still in Europe, Mehmed II laid siege to Trebizond. Emperor David Megas Komnenos, successor to John IV, waited in vain for assistance from his Georgian ally before finally surrendering the city on 15 August 1461—exactly two hundred years after the reconquest of Constantinople by Michael VIII Palaiologos. This event marked the end of the last remnant of Byzantine civilization. Helena Kantakouzene, the emperor's consort, fled to Georgia, provoking the sultan's anger. A few years later, George, the last surviving son of Emperor David, escaped imprisonment in Constantinople and sought refuge at the court of George VIII.

=== The Rebellion of Bagrat ===
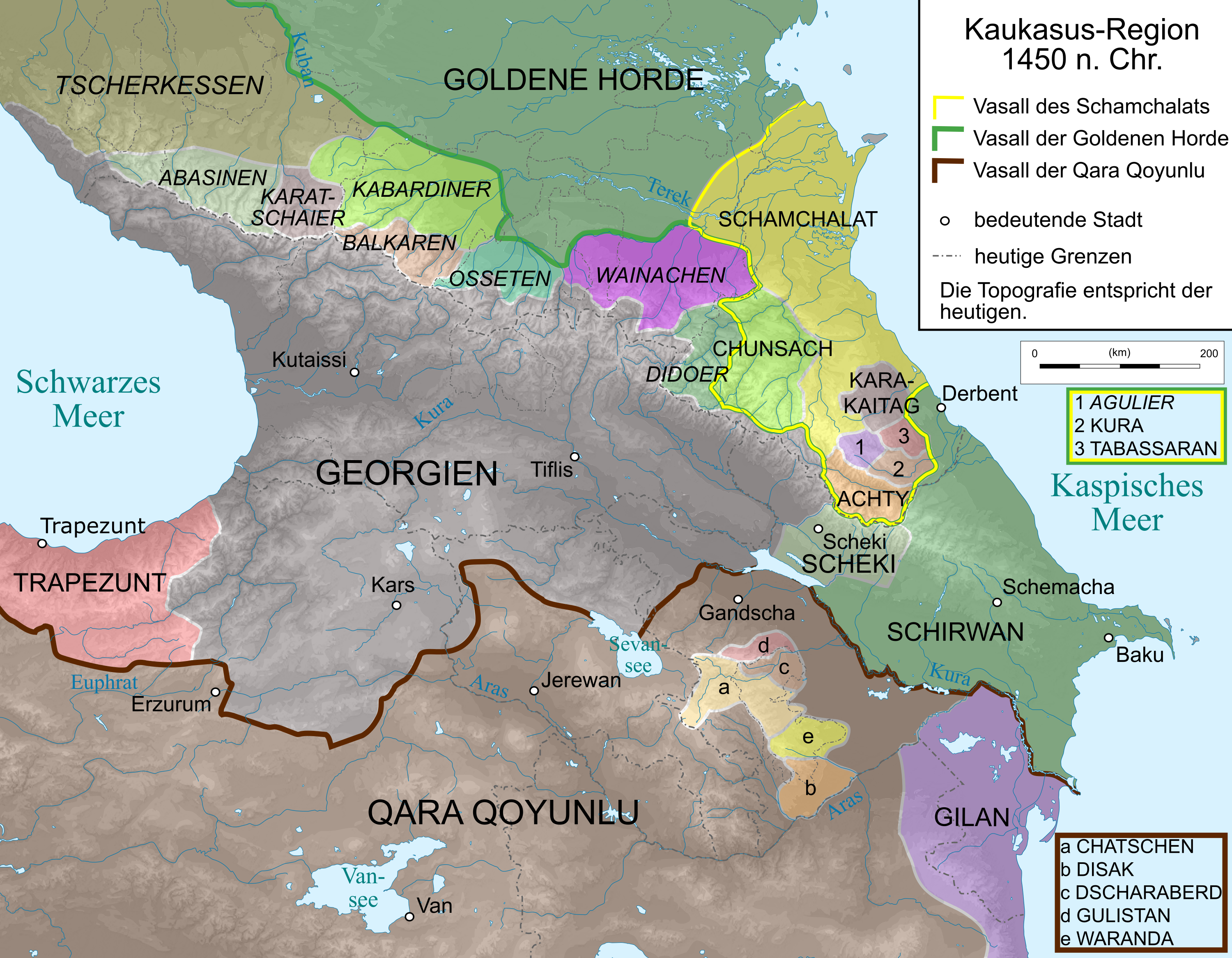
Expansion of the Kingdom of Georgia during the reign of George VIII.

The fragile unity among the Georgian states collapsed following the failure of King George VIII's diplomatic mission to Europe. Although Qvarqvare II of Samtskhe remained a nominal vassal and ally of the crown, he began encouraging Duke Bagrat of Samokalako to rise in rebellion against the king. Bagrat was a descendant of the Bagrationi dynasty of Imereti—the oldest branch of the royal family—whose last ruler, Constantine II of Western Georgia, had been deposed by George VII in 1401. Bagrat now sought to reclaim the throne of his ancestors. As a cousin of George VIII, his intentions initially aroused little suspicion among the local nobility, but he soon gained the support of powerful magnates from western Georgia.

In addition to his alliance with Samtskhe, Bagrat secured the backing of Liparit I of Mingrelia, Mamia of Guria, and the princes of Abkhazia and Svaneti, promising to free them from central control. Together, the rebels captured numerous fortresses in Imereti in 1462. In response, George VIII abolished the Duchy of Samokalako and prepared to intervene militarily. In 1463, the king crossed the Likhi Range and called upon Samtskhe for military support, convinced of its loyalty. Qvarqvare II, however, marched his troops into Imereti only to encamp far from the battlefield, waiting to see which side would prevail—a move widely interpreted as tacit support for the rebels.

George VIII and Bagrat met in battle at Chikhori, where the royal army suffered a decisive defeat. The king withdrew to Kartli and imposed harsh punishments on nobles he deemed disloyal. Meanwhile, Bagrat seized Kutaisi, the largest city in western Georgia, and was crowned King of Imereti (as Bagrat II) in the presence of the high nobility of Mingrelia, Guria, Abkhazia, Samtskhe, and Svaneti. Despite his coronation, his authority remained weak, even within his capital.

The Battle of Chikhori marked the beginning of the disintegration of the unified Kingdom of Georgia. From that point onward, its monarchs would never again rule over the entire country.

=== War Against Samtskhe ===
Qvarqvare II once again began pursuing plans to assert independence from Georgia. He soon minted his own coinage in Akhaltsikhe and styled himself "king" (Georgian: მეფე, romanized: mepe) in his decrees before formally declaring war on King George VIII. For this campaign, he secured the support of Uzun Hasan, who defeated the Georgian king in 1462—though some sources place the event in 1461 or 1463—and occupied the region of Lori. The alliance, however, turned against Qvarqvare II when the White Sheep Turkomans ravaged and plundered Samtskhe during their advance.

In retaliation, George VIII seized the opportunity to strike back. During the atabeg's visit to Imereti—where Qvarqvare II formally recognized Bagrat's coronation—the king invaded Samtskhe. He gained the support of much of the local nobility, both great and small, who feared Qvarqvare's autocratic rule, and occupied the region without encountering resistance. The atabeg was forced to flee temporarily to the court of the King of Imereti. The king's absence from central Georgia, however, allowed Uzun Hasan to return and launch another incursion in 1463, dispatching his generals Tavrij Gilak and Timur to devastate Kartli. The Georgian army rushed to meet the invaders but was defeated, enabling the Turkomans to lay waste to eastern Georgia. The kingdom quickly lost control of the situation, and the eastern provinces of Shirvan, Arran, and Movakan broke away from Georgian authority.

Meanwhile, Qvarqvare II—assisted by Bagrat's forces—returned to Samtskhe to reclaim his domains. After recapturing Akhaltsikhe, he exacted brutal retribution upon the local nobility, executing many of his opponents. The nobleman Zaza of Panaskerti fled to the royal court, where he became one of the king's closest advisors. Later, the atabeg enlisted the aid of Duke Mamia of Guria to reconquer rebellious provinces, rewarding him with the territories of Adjara and Chaneti—further deepening the fragmentation of western Georgia.

In 1465, George VIII narrowly survived an assassination attempt in which his courtier Iotam Zedgenidze was fatally stabbed while defending him. In recognition of Zedgenidze's sacrifice, the king elevated his sons to the high nobility, granting them numerous fortresses in Kartli, the title of prefects (Georgian: მოურავი, romanized: mouravi) of Gori, and the hereditary rank of "Commanders-in-Chief of Kartli". In the aftermath, George resolved to invade Samtskhe once more, having secured the support of the Duchy of Aragvi.

A decisive battle took place near Lake Paravani, a day after a second assassination attempt and a failed round of negotiations. Initially, royal forces held the upper hand, but the atabeg succeeded in encircling their positions. The king was captured along with his personal guard. His nephew, the young Constantine, managed to escape and took command of the remaining forces, retreating northward before being besieged in Gori by Qvarqvare II and fleeing to western Georgia. George VIII was imprisoned in Akhaltsikhe, marking the end of his reign as the sovereign of a unified Georgian kingdom.

=== Captivity and Release ===
Charter of King George VIII.

With no central authority in place, the kingdom descended into political chaos. Following the capture of George VIII and the flight of Constantine to western Georgia, the Georgian throne was left vacant. The king remained a hostage of Qvarqvare II until the early months of 1466. In February of that year, Bagrat II of Imereti marched with his army to the Georgian capital and, after granting two villages to the catholicos David, was crowned King of Georgia under the name Bagrat VI, thereby deposing the imprisoned monarch. The new ruler controlled most of Georgia except for the province of Kakheti, which rebelled against his autocratic rule and proclaimed the noble David of Didoeti as its regional governor. (Note: Georgian sources disagree on the status of this David:Vakhushti of Kartli and Marie-Félicité Brosset say that he was a self-proclaimed king who later founded the dynasty of the kings of Kakheti. Modern historians, such as William Edward David Allen, Kalistrat Salia, and Donald Rayfield, do not recognise the existence of this character. Nodar Asatiani mentioned that he was a local governor of mysterious origin who preceded George VIII as ruler of Kakheti.)

Although Qvarqvare II had supported Bagrat's rise, he soon came to fear the growing power of the new monarch. For Samtskhe, political stability in Georgia posed a direct threat to the separatist ambitions of the Jaqeli dynasty—regardless of who sat on the throne. The atabeg—identified by contemporary historians as Qvarqvare II, or by Vakhushti of Kartli as his son Baadur—entered into negotiations with the deposed king. Under the terms of their agreement, George VIII promised to pardon Samtskhe's rebellion, guarantee Akhaltsikhe's autonomy, and renounce his claims over western Georgia in exchange for his release. A lesser-known version of events adds that he was compelled to marry Princess Tamar Jaqeli, the atabeg's daughter, despite still being wed to Nestan-Darejan, who was residing in Tbilisi at the time.

Placed in command of a Samtskhe army, George VIII attempted to invade Kartli in 1466 but faced widespread resistance from the local nobility, who feared his retribution should he return to power. Defeated in Kartli, he retreated with the atabeg and his troops to Kakheti, then under the rule of David of Didoeti. In this eastern Georgian province, George gained the support of the petty nobility—likely out of respect for his earlier tenure as its governor. He soon defeated David, despite the latter's military backing from King Bagrat VI, forcing him to retreat into the mountainous regions of Kakheti. George established himself in the province's central territories but lacked the strength to consolidate full control.

Meanwhile, the atabeg returned to Samtskhe and declared its independence, while George VIII remained in Kakheti. This marked the beginning of a definitive fragmentation of the Georgian kingdom and the end of its political unity.

== King of Kakheti ==
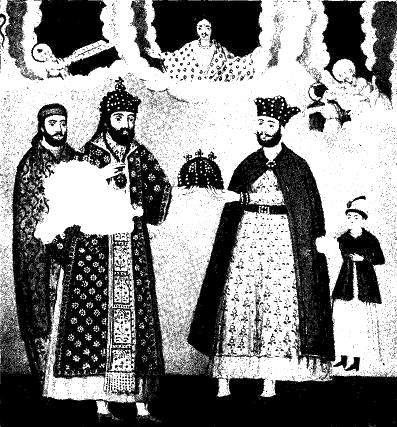
Patriarch Nikolaoz, king George VIII and his son Alexander. A miniature by Rossi based on the 17th century fresco from Svetitskhoveli Cathedral (1830s)

The Kingdom of Georgia after its dissolution as a unified state.

The deposed monarch was crowned king of Kakheti at the Bodbe Monastery, the religious center of Georgia (Note: Christian tradition holds Bodbe to be the place of death of Saint Nino, who converted the Kingdom of Iberia to Christianity in the 4th century.) as George I, thereby restoring an ancient kingdom that had been abolished by Georgia in the 12th century. (Note: The first Kingdom of Kakheti existed between 1014 and 1104, before being conquered by David IV of Georgia.) However, he faced considerable challenges in asserting his authority at the time of his accession. Although the mountainous province of David of Didoeti acknowledged him as monarch in exchange for his freedom, the remaining northern regions formally remained subject to the Kingdom of Georgia. Thus, Khevsureti, Tusheti, and Pshavi recognized him only as lord of Kakheti, and it was only after reaching an agreement with Bagrat VI that these provinces were incorporated into George I's domains.

Confronted with a powerful nobility opposed to Kakheti's independence, George I forged alliances with the peasantry, the lower nobility, and even with his former enemy, Bagrat VI. Around 1467, he concluded a military alliance with Bagrat to support him in his conflict against Constantine, his former protégé who also claimed the Georgian crown, in exchange for formal recognition of Kakheti as an independent kingdom. The two monarchs invaded Kartli and expelled Constantine from central Georgia, enabling Bagrat VI to recover Tbilisi and his royal title. Subsequently, a royal detachment was dispatched to subdue recalcitrant nobles in Kakheti and to help George I consolidate his authority.

Following an attempted uprising in 1470 aimed at placing David of Didoeti on the throne, George I undertook reforms of the Kakhetian system of governance to curb the power of the nobility. He abolished the semi-autonomous duchies and established a number of prefectures, including Kiziki, Elisseni, Chukheti, Didoeti, Tianeti, Chiauri, Shilda, Kvareli, Martkopi, Gremi, and Pankisi. These administrative units were headed by prefects (mouravis) appointed by the king, responsible for collecting taxes and delivering them to the capital, Gremi. The prefects were rotated regularly, thereby eliminating the power of the hereditary aristocracy.

George I also implemented a military reform, dividing the kingdom into four districts known as sadrosho, each with its own troops commanded by a bishop appointed by the king—a stark contrast to western Georgia, where military forces were led by powerful hereditary princes.

He further elevated the abbot of the Alaverdi Monastery to the rank of bishop, granting him a diocese and placing him above other regional prelates. Although Kakheti continued to recognize the authority of the Georgian Orthodox Church, this reform effectively made the province an autonomous region within the Catholicosate. The city of Gremi was proclaimed the capital, expanded, and fortified, while the province's autonomy and the name Hereti were abolished. These reforms brought lasting peace and stability to the kingdom, eliminating the problem of rebellious nobility that plagued Kartli and Imereti until the 18th century.

On the international stage, Kakheti's situation remained precarious due to its border with Persia. Uzun Hasan soon invaded the kingdom, ravaging the provinces of Kherki, Saguramo, Martkopi, and Tianeti. George I was compelled to recognize Uzun Hasan's suzerainty in order to secure peace and agreed to pay him an annual tribute consisting of male and female slaves. During the 1470s, he refused to assist his neighbor in Kartli when Turkomans devastated the region, opting instead to preserve peace in his own realm through diplomatic means. According to Vakhushti of Kartli, George I spent his later years unsuccessfully attempting to reconquer the rest of Georgia.

George I died in 1476, though the exact date remains unknown. He was succeeded by his eldest son, Alexander, who had been associated with him as co-ruler since 1460.

== Family ==
George married twice. His first marriage was to Tamar, daughter of Qvarqvare II Jaqeli, Atabeg of Samtskhe. They had one son and two daughters:

- Prince Vakhtang, who married a certain Gulkan;
- Princess Keteon (Kristine), who married Vakhushti Shalikashvili;
- Princess Helen, who married Spiridon Beenashvili.

His second marriage was to a certain Nestan-Darejan. They had one son and one daughter:

- Alexander I of Kakheti (1454/56–1511), King of Kakheti (r. 1476–1511);
- Princess Mariam, who married George, son of Vameq Shaburidze, Duke of Aragvi.

== Legacy ==
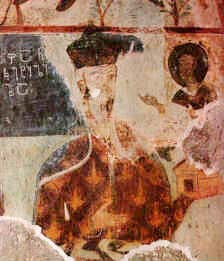
Zaza Panaskerteli undertook many cultural projects in Georgia under the patronage of George VIII.

The reign of George VIII coincided with the fall of Constantinople, one of the most significant events in 15th-century Europe. The conquest of the Byzantine Empire in 1453, followed by that of Trebizond in 1461, opened Georgia to a new and formidable enemy—the Ottoman Empire—posing not only a military threat, but also an economic one. The disruption of trade routes through Constantinople isolated Georgia from its commercial partners in the maritime republics of Italy, severely impoverishing the kingdom and compelling Western Europe to seek new trade routes.

During George VIII's reign, the nobility gained increasing power—a trend that had begun under King Vakhtang IV—resulting in enduring political instability. The lesser nobility, or aznauri class (village lords), achieved considerable autonomy and often withheld taxes from the central authorities. The higher nobility became semi-independent, refusing to recognize royal jurisdiction within their domains and supporting Bagrat VI's usurpation in 1462. The final fragmentation of the Kingdom of Georgia began with the declaration of independence by Samtskhe and the rise of a new noble class, the tavadis—independent princes de facto—making George VIII the last monarch of a unified Georgia, although the division was formally recognized only in 1490.

In contrast, his later reign in Kakheti was marked by a series of reforms that ushered in a long period of stability, standing in stark opposition to the disorder prevailing in Imereti and Kartli. These reforms curtailed the power of the nobility and elevated the status of his most loyal retainers, resulting not only in peace but also in the repopulation of the region.

Culturally, George VIII served as a patron of Zaza Panaskerteli, a nobleman from Samtskhe who sought refuge at the royal court during his conflict with Qvarqvare II. Zaza later authored the medical treatise Karabadini, established a Transcaucasian cultural center at Mdzovreti in Shida Kartli, and restored the Kintsvisi Monastery. In Jerusalem, the king appointed Beena Cholokashvili as abbot of the Monastery of the Cross; under his leadership, the Georgian presence in the Holy Land expanded, expelling French Catholic and Armenian Orthodox clergy from the Cathedral of Saint James. The caves of Vani also preserve cultural remains dating from the Georgian Triumvirate War of the 1460s, which drove many minor nobles into exile from Samtskhe; a small rock-hewn church there contains inscriptions of poems written by the exiled nobles' wives.

The Italian novel L'ultimo Paleologo by Emanuele Rizzardi (2017) is set in Georgia during the fall of the Byzantine Empire. George VIII appears as one of the main antagonists, though he is erroneously portrayed as Duke of Imereti and a usurper to the throne.

== Chronological Uncertainty ==
The life of George VIII represents one of the most debated episodes in the history of the Georgian monarchy. The Georgian Chronicles—the principal source on the lives of Georgia's medieval kings—are notably confused regarding this ruler's reign, family, and chronology. Vakhushti of Kartli, following the anonymous author of George VIII's biography, attributes to him a reign of only ten years, while Marie-Félicité Brosset assigns a reign of twenty-four years, consistent with the period between 1442—the year of his father's abdication—and 1476, the date of his death.

The earliest royal charter bearing George VIII's signature dates to 1447, one year after the death of Vakhtang IV. However, a document from 1449 refers to the fifth year of his reign, implying an accession in 1444 for reasons that remain unexplained. Another charter, equally puzzling, cites 1454 as the fifteenth year of his reign.

The medieval source, followed by W. E. D. Allen, identifies George VIII—sometimes also referred to as "George IX", since the chronicle counts Prince George, the son of Constantine I of Georgia, and George I of Kakheti as separate rulers—as distinct monarchs, a claim rejected by modern historians. According to this interpretation, George ascended the throne not in 1446 but in 1453, following the death of his brother Demetrius. He was said to be the father of the future Constantine II and to have become King of Kakheti in 1471, succeeding David of Didoeti—possibly a son of Demetrius—and ruling until 1492.

The historical existence of David of Didoeti remains uncertain; modern scholarship neither recognizes him as a king nor as a relative of George VIII. The same medieval source claims that George died in 1469.

The Georgian Chronicles further mention a certain Vakhtang as George VIII's successor in Kakheti. Marie-Félicité Brosset identifies this figure with Vakhtang, brother of Bagrat III of Imereti, who rebelled against him in the early 16th century, although this individual bore no connection to Kakheti.

== Ancestors ==
Ancestors of George VIII

8. Bagrat V of Georgia
4. Constantine I of Georgia
9. Anna of Trebizond
2. Alexander I of Georgia
10. Kutsna Amirejibi
5. Natia Amirejibi
11. Rusa
1. George VIII of Georgia
12. Bagrat I of Imereti
6. Alexander I of Imereti
13. Natela Jaqeli
3. Tamar of Imereti
7. Ana

== Bibliography ==
- Allen, W.E.D. (1932). A History of the Georgian People. London: Routledge & Keagan Paul.
- Asatiani, Nodar (2008). Საქართველოს ისტორია II [History of Georgia, Volume 2] (in Georgian). Tbilisi: Tbilisi University Press. ISBN 978-9941-13-004-5.
- Asatiani, Nodar; Janelidze, Otar (2009). History of Georgia. Tbilisi: Publishing House Petite. ISBN 978-9941906367.
- Babinger, Franz (1978). Hickman, William C. (ed.). Mehmed the Conqueror and His Time. Translated by Manheim, Ralph. Princeton, New Jersey: Princeton University Press. ISBN 978-0-691-01078-6.
- Brosset, Marie-Félicité (1851). Additions et éclaircissements à l'histoire de la Géorgie depuis l'Antiquité jusqu'en 1469 de J.-C [Additions and clarifications to the history of Georgia from Antiquity to AD 1469] (in French). St.-Petersbourg: Imprimerie de l'Académie Impériale des Sciences.
- Brosset, Marie-Félicité (1849). Histoire de la Géorgie depuis l'Antiquité jusqu'au XIXe siècle. Volume I [History of Georgia from Ancient Times to the 19th Century, Volume 1] (in French). Saint-Petersburg: Imperial Academy of Sciences.
- Brosset, Marie-Félicité (1858). Introduction et Tables des Matières (in French). Paris: Imprimerie de l'Académie Impériale des Sciences.
- Kaldellis, Anthony (2012). "The Interpolations in the Histories of Laonikos Chalkokondyles". Greek, Roman, and Byzantine Studies. 52 (2).
- Mihailović, Konstantin (2011). Memoirs of a Janissary. Translated by Stolz, Benjamin. ISBN 9781558765313.
- Miller, William (1969). Trebizond; the last Greek empire of the Byzantine era, 1204-1461. ISBN 978-0824401122.

Montpéreux, Frédéric Dubois de (1839). Voyage autour du Caucase, chez les Tcherkesses et les Abkhases, en Colchide, en Géorgie, en Arménie et en Crimée (in French). Vol. II. Paris: Librairie de Gide. pp. 93–165.

- Nicol, Donald M. (1968). The Byzantine family of Kantakouzenos ca. 1100-1460; A genealogical and prosopographical study. Dumbarton Oaks Center for Byzantine Studies.
- Nicol, Donald M. (2004). The last centuries of Byzantium, 1261-1453 (2 ed.). Cambridge University Press. ISBN 978-0521439916.
- Rayfield, Donald (2012). Edge of Empires, a History of Georgia. London: Reaktion Books. ISBN 978-1-78023-070-2.
- Runciman, Steven (2015). The fall of Constantinople, 1453. Cambridge University Press. ISBN 9780521398329.
- Salia, Kalistrat (1980). Histoire de la nation géorgienne [History of the Georgian nation] (in French). Paris: Nino Salia.
- Sardar, Ziauddin; Davies, Merryl Wyn (2014). The No-Nonsense Guide to Islam. New Internationalist. ISBN 9781906523626. OCLC 1041823297.
- Takaishvili, Ekvtime, ed. (1910). Antiquities of Georgia, Volume III (in Georgian). Tiflis: Historical and Ethnographic Society of Georgia.
- Toumanoff, Cyril (1949–1951). "The Fifteenth-Century Bagratids and the Institution of Collegial Sovereignty in Georgia". Traditio. 7: 169–221. doi:10.1017/S0362152900015142. JSTOR 27830207. S2CID 149043757.

Preceded by Vakhtang IV	King of Georgia; 1446–1466	Succeeded by Bagrat VI
Preceded by New creation	King of Kakheti; 1466–1476	Succeeded by Alexander I
