= Banas Kantha =

Banas Kantha may refer to:

- Banaskantha district, district of Gujarat, India
  - Banaskantha Lok Sabha constituency
- Banas Kantha Agency, agency for the princely states of the British Raj in colonial India

== See also ==
- Banas (disambiguation)
- Kantha (disambiguation)
