= Vakhtang IV =

King of Georgia from 1442 to 1446

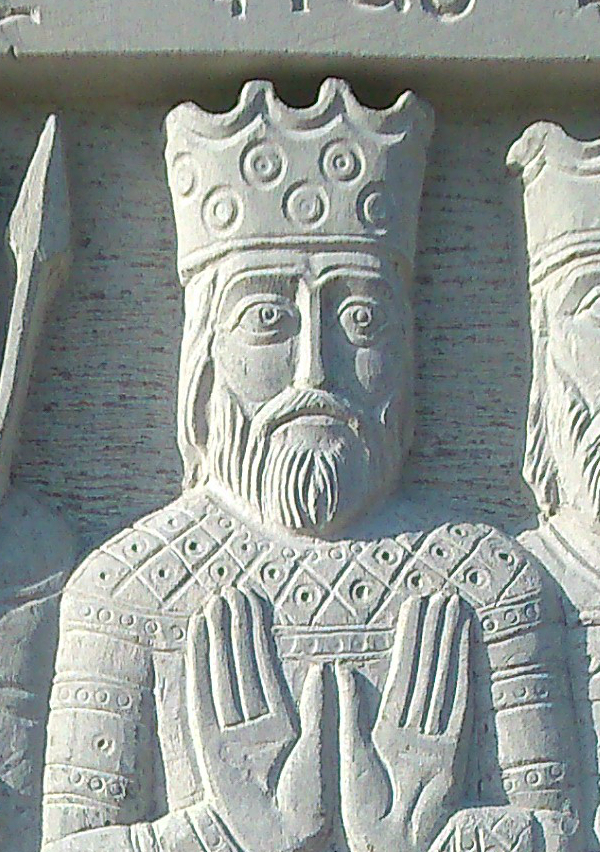
- Relief of King Vakhtang IV

King of Georgia
- Reign: 1442–1446
- Predecessor: Alexander I
- Successor: George VIII
- Co-kings: Demetrius (1442–1446); George VIII (1442–1446)
- Born: 1413
- Died: December 1446 (aged 32–33)
- Burial: Bana Cathedral
- Spouse: Sitikhatun Panaskerteli
- Dynasty: Bagrationi
- Father: Alexander I of Georgia
- Mother: Dulandukht Orbelian
- Religion: Georgian Orthodox Church
- Khelrtva

Vakhtang IV (Georgian: ვახტანგ IV) (c. 1413 – December 1446), of the Bagrationi dynasty, was a king (mepe) of the Kingdom of Georgia who reigned from 1433 to his death, associated to the throne of his father Alexander I from 1433 to the latter's abdication in 1442 and sharing the throne with his three brothers until his death in 1446.

As king, he only controlled parts of the kingdom and had to face a Turkoman invasion. His reign witnessed the beginning of the disintegration of Georgia into smaller states and the collapse of the Georgian realm.

== Early life and co-king ==
Vakhtang was born around 1413, oldest son of King Alexander I of Georgia and his first wife, Dulandukht Orbelian, a daughter of Beshken II Orbelian. Little information exists on his life prior to his association to the throne.

Imitating the Byzantine system of governance and to avoid a potential crisis of succession, King Alexander I decided in 1433 to associate his four sons Vakhtang, Demetrius, George, and Zaal to the throne, with Vakhtang serving holding more powers as the oldest of the four. He was assigned the central Georgian province of Kartli to govern.

In 1439, he sent his own representative to the Council of Florence convened by Pope Eugene IV in his attempt to bring the weakened Eastern Churches under the dominion of the Catholic Church. British historian Donald Rayfield believed that his emissary played a political role, as more representation from the Kingdom of Georgia meant a balance on the representatives of Samtskhe and Mingrelia, two Georgian principalities seeking the recognition of their autonomy by Rome.

== Main rule ==
Vakhtang's younger brother and co-king Zaal died in 1442. The same year, King Alexander I abdicated the throne to become a monk. Vakhtang IV was forced to accept his brothers George and Demetrius as co-monarchs, but was recognized as the main King of Georgia, being crowned by his fourth brother, Catholicos David III. Vakhtang IV took the traditional titles of Georgian monarchs: "King of Rans, Kakhetians, Svans, Greeks, Armenians, Mingrelians, Kartvelians, Jiks and Alans, Shirvanshah and Shahanshah, King of Kings of Imereti and Amiereti, of the East, of the North, and of all Christendom."

The territory under his direct control is not clear. According to Vakhushti of Kartli and Marie-Félicité Brosset, he kept control of Kartli and the kingdom's capital, Tbilisi. However, Catholicos Anton II, who wrote in the 18th century, listed King Vakhtang IV's domains as mainly principalities of Western Georgia: Abkhazia, Jiketi, Samegrelo, Guria and Imereti. Prince David Bagrationi, who would write later in the 19th century, added Ossetia to his domains, even though Anton II listed the latter as part of Demetrius' territories. According to both, Kartli was under the governorship of Demetrius'.

Upon acceding the throne, he married Princess Sitikhatun Panaskerteli in a union arranged by his father. She was a daughter of Prince Zaal Panaskerteli-Tsitsishvili, but died just two years later in 1444, childless. Vakhtang IV would never remarry.

In 1444, Jahan Shah, Sultan of Qara Qoyunlu, attempted a new invasion of Georgia. King Vakhtang met him in Akhaltsikhe, where the Georgians and Turkomans fought in a bloody battle that ended without a clear victor. At night, Jahan Shah and his troops left Georgia and returned to Tabriz, putting an end to the Turkoman incursion.

His short reign of four years was marked by a domestic failure to decrease the influence of the powerful nobility. He thus failed to reduce the powers of the great noble Taqa Panaskerteli and was forced to appoint him mouravi. Following the death of Atabeg Ivane III of Samtskhe in 1444, he appointed the latter's son Qvarqvare II as atabeg of the region, but this decision led to a civil war in Samtskhe between Qvarqvare II and his uncle Aghbugha, the latter coming out victorious.

In December 1446, Vakhtang IV died. He was buried at the Bana cathedral, at the side of Queen Sitikhatun. Without an heir, the kingdom fell into a conflict of succession: Demetrius, the older of the remaining brothers, fell into civil strife in Imereti, while George VIII took over Kartli and Kakheti, probably per the wish of King Vakhtang IV himself.

== Family ==
In 1442, King Vakhtang IV married Princess Sitikhatun Panaskerteli, daughter of Prince Zaza Panaskherteli-Tsitsishvili, lord of Khevsureti and Kareli. She would die in 1444 with no issue.

== Bibliography ==
- Brosset, Marie-Félicité (1849). Histoire de la Géorgie depuis l'Antiquité jusqu'au XIXe siècle. Volume I [History of Georgia from Ancient Times to the 19th Century, Volume 1] (in French). Saint-Petersburg: Imperial Academy of Sciences.
- Rayfield, Donald (2012). Edge of Empires, a History of Georgia. London: Reaktion Books. ISBN 978-1-78023-070-2.
- Toumanoff, Cyril (1949). The Fifteenth-Century Bagratids and the Institution of Collegial Sovereignty in Georgia.
