= Kanta (given name) =

Kanta is an Indian, Bengali, and Japanese (written: 貫太) given name. Notable people with the name include:

- Kanta Chiba, (born 2003) Japanese football player
- Kanta Gupta (1938–2016), Indian mathematician
- Kanta Higashionna (born 1992), Japanese rugby union player
- Kanta Ina (fl. 1970s), Japanese actor
- Kanta Nalawade (fl. 1990s–2000s), Indian politician from Maharashtra
- Kanta Nakano (中野寛太; born 2000), Japanese judoka
- Kanta Rao (1923–2009), Indian film actor and producer from Telugu cinema
- Kanta Saroop Krishen (1929–2024), Indian social worker
- Kanta Sato (born 1996), Japanese actor
- Kanta Subbarao (fl. early 21st century), Indian virologist, molecular geneticist, and physician-scientist
- Kanta Tsuneyama (born 1996), Japanese badminton player
- Albert Kanta Kambala (1958–2008), Zaire football midfielder
- Balivada Kanta Rao (1927–2000), Indian Telugu novelist and playwright
- Kamala Kanta Kalita (born 1957), Indian politician
- Krishna Kanta Handique (1898–1982), Indian Sanskrit scholar
- Laxmi Kanta Chawla (fl. 2007–2012), Indian Punjabi politician
- Rajani Kanta Barman (born 1979), Bangladeshi football defender
- Rajat Kanta Ray (1946–2025), Bengali historian
- Rama Kanta Dewri (fl. from 2016), Indian politician
- Snehansu Kanta Acharya (1913–1986), Advocate General of West Bengal, India
- Subhrangsu Kanta Acharyya (born 1940), Indian geologist
- Surjya Kanta Mishra (born 1949), Indian politician
- Tarini Kanta Roy (fl. 2008–2014), Indian politician
- Uma Kanta Chaudhari (born 1966), Nepalese politician
