= Tamar (daughter of Alexander I of Imereti) =

15th-century Queen of Georgia

Tamar (Georgian: თამარი) was a Georgian royal of the House of Imereti and Queen of Georgia as the second wife of King Alexander I of Georgia. She was the daughter of Alexander I of Imereti and the mother of King George VIII, David II, Catholicos-Patriarch of Georgia, and Prince Zaal.

== Biography ==
Tamar was the daughter of Alexander I of Imereti and his wife, Ana. She belonged to the House of Imereti, a branch of the Bagrationi dynasty descended in the female line from Queen Tamar I's daughter, Queen Rusudan, and her consort, Ghias ad-Din. Tamar's father and her uncles, George I and Constantine II, proclaimed themselves kings of Imereti, taking advantage of Timur's invasions of Georgia. Nevertheless, the kings of Georgia not only deprived the Imeretian house of any hope of achieving independence but also temporarily dispossessed Tamar's brother, Demetrius.

Around 1414 or 1415, Tamar married the new King Alexander I of Georgia as his second wife. According to Prince Vakhushti, Alexander had heard of Tamar's beauty since his youth and married her in 1414. According to Cyril Toumanoff, through her brother's forfeiture Tamar became the heiress of Imereti, and Alexander may have sought to legitimize, in the eyes of the nobility, his acquisition of that important fief, which many may have regarded as the despoilment of a great house. After their marriage, however, Alexander appears to have restored her brother, Demetrius, as the vassal Duke of Imereti.

A charter issued by Queen Tamar in 1433 has survived. It is noteworthy because she styles herself mepe, a title designating a reigning sovereign of royal rank, rather than dedopali, the title used for a sovereign's wife. This may have been a conscious imitation of the great Queen Tamar I, who was a queen regnant suo jure, or she may have assumed the title as heiress to the Kingdom of Imereti.

Alexander and Tamar had three sons: George VIII, King of Georgia from 1446 to 1465 and founder of the Kingdom of Kakheti, where he reigned from 1466 to 1478; David II, Catholicos-Patriarch of Georgia; and Prince Zaal.

== Bibliography ==
- Toumanoff, Cyril (1949–1951). "The Fifteenth-Century Bagratids and the Institution of Collegial Sovereignty in Georgia". Traditio. 7: 169–221. doi:10.1017/S0362152900015142. JSTOR 27830207.
- Brosset, Marie-Félicité (1856). Histoire de la Georgie depuis l'antiquite jusqu'au 19. siecle (in French). Vol. 5. l'acad. Imper. des sciences.
