= Banaś =

Banaś is a Polish surname. Some persons with the surname include:

- Adam Banaś (born 1982), Polish professional footballer
- Bolesław Banaś (1912–1991), Polish fencer
- Jan Banaś (born 1943), Polish footballer
- Julia Banaś (born 1997), Polish fashion model
- Kasia Banaś (born 1973), Polish artist
- Marian Banaś (born 1955), Polish politician and civil servant

== See also ==
- Banas (disambiguation)
