= Banas Medical College and Research Institute, Palanpur =

Medical college in Palanpur, Gujarat

- Type: Medical College and Hospital
- Established: 2018; 8 years ago
- Address: Palanpur, Gujarat, India
- Affiliations: Hemchandracharya North Gujarat University
- Website: www.bmcri.co.in

Banas Medical College and Research Institute, Palanpur is a medical college located in Palanpur, Gujarat. It was established in May 2018 after the Ministry of Health and Family Welfare gave permission for an intake of 150 seats following the recommendation of the Medical Council of India. The college imparts the degree Bachelor of Medicine and Surgery (MBBS). Nursing and para-medical courses are also offered. The college is affiliated to Hemchandracharya North Gujarat University. The hospital associated with the college is one of the largest hospitals in the Palanpur. The selection to the college is done on the basis of merit through National Eligibility and Entrance Test.

== History ==
Galbabhai Nanjibhai Patel Charitable Trust is established on 17 September 2016 by Banas Dairy founded by Galbabhai and approved by the Charity Commissioner, Palanpur. It is a private trust and runs the medical college based on private public partnership model. On 22 September 2018, the deputy chief minister and health minister Nitin Patel inaugurated the Banas medical college at Palanpur.

In late May 2024, the interns did a strike to demand full stipend.

== Courses ==
Banas Medical College and Research Institute, Palanpur undertakes education and training of students MBBS courses. This college has increased the seats from 150 in 2018 to 200 MBBS seats in 2019, of which 85% seats are allocated for state quota and 15% is for NRI/management quota.
