= Bana, Rajasthan =

Bana
- village
- Location in Rajasthan, India Bana (India)
- Coordinates: 27.978485°N 74.034462°E
- Country: India
- State: Rajasthan

Government
  - Type: Panchayati Raj
  - Body: Gram Panchayat

Languages
  - Official: Hindi
- Time zone: UTC+5:30 (IST)
- ISO 3166 code: RJ-IN
- Vehicle registration: RJ-

Bana is a village located in Bikaner district in Rajasthan, India. It is situated 10 km south of Sri Dungargarh city. It was founded by Bana (clan) Jats.

Bana village is inhabited by "Bana"(clan) Jats. Population of this village majorly rely on agriculture consisting both irrigated, and non-irrigated farming.

== Demographics ==
According to Census-2011, conducted by Government of India; total population of this village is 3,324, out of which 1,780 are males, and 1544 are females. There are a total of 576 houses in this village. Literacy rate of this village is 65.64%.

== Transport ==
This village is located on the SH-93 (Rajasthan), which connects Bidasar to Shri Dungargarh.

Railway transportation facilities are not available in this village, at this time. Inhabitants need to travel to either Bikaner or Shri Dungargarh.
