= Bana cathedral =

Ruined cathedral in Turkey

Bana
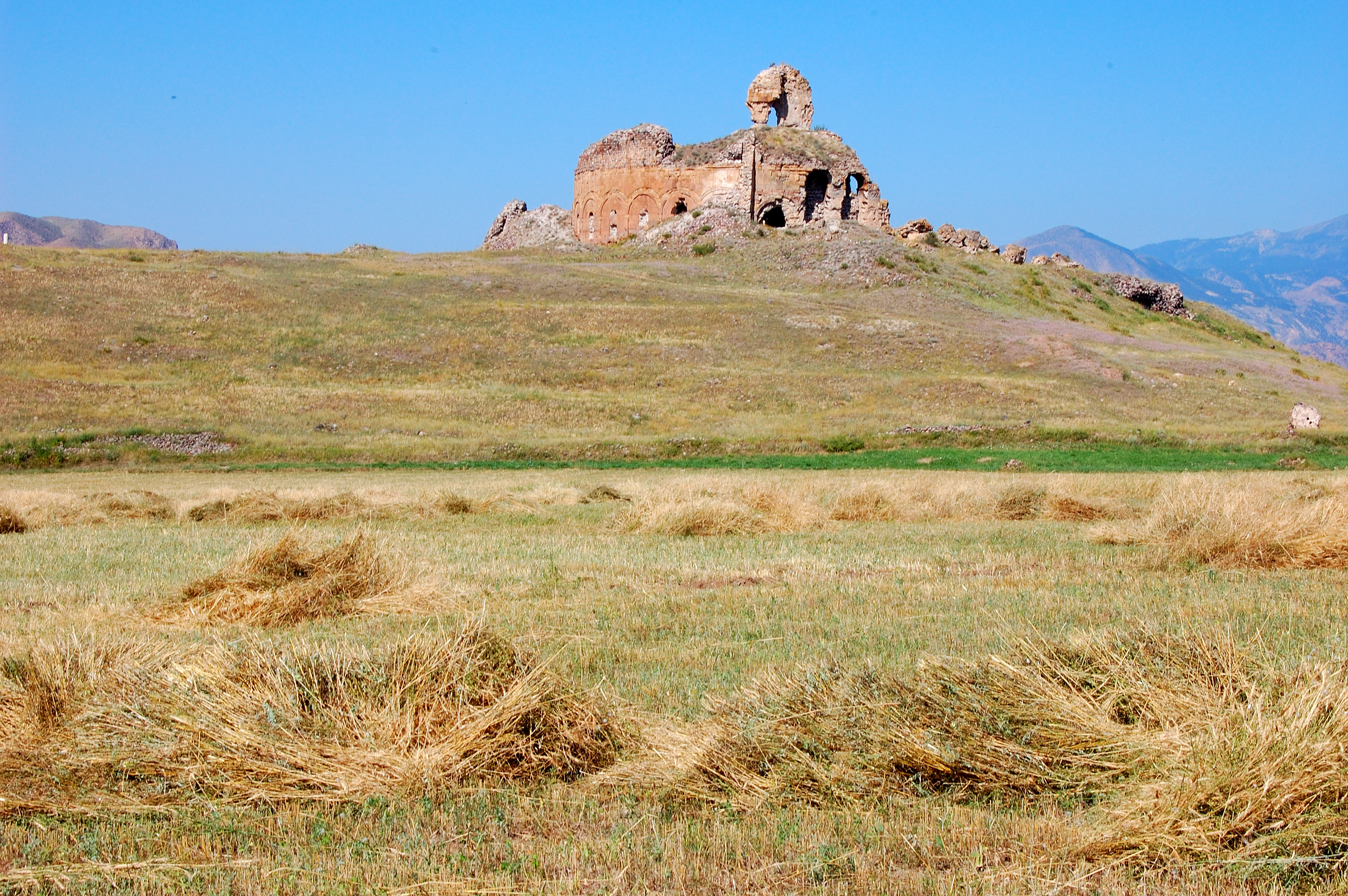
- The ruins of the cathedral in 2007

- Location within Turkey

Religion
- Status: Abandoned

Location
- Location: Şenkaya, Erzurum Province, Turkey
- Coordinates: 40.668061°N 42.269961°E

Architecture
- Architect: Kvirik from Bana (during the rule of Adarnase II of Tao-Klarjeti)
- Type: Monastery, church
- Style: Armenian, Georgian
- Completed: c. 653–658, rebuilt c. 881–923
- Height (max): 37.45m

Bana (Georgian: ბანა; Armenian: Բանակ, romanized: Banak; Turkish: Penek Kilisesi) is a ruined early medieval cathedral in present-day Erzurum Province, eastern Turkey, in what had formerly been a historical marchland known to Armenians as Tayk and to Georgians as Tao.

It is a large tetraconch design, surrounded by a near-rotunda polygonal ambulatory and marked with a cylindrical drum. Generally believed to have been constructed in the 7th century, based on an 11th-century chronicle it was reconstructed by Adarnase IV of Iberia at some point between 881 and 923. Henceforth, it was used as a royal cathedral by the Bagrationi dynasty until the Ottoman conquest of the area in the 16th century. The former cathedral was converted into a fortress by the Ottoman army during the Crimean War. The monastery was almost completely ruined during the Russo-Turkish war of 1877–78.

== Location and etymology ==
The Bana cathedral is located on the north bank of the Penek (Irlağaç) river near the village of Penek, in the Şenkaya district of Erzurum Province. "Penek" is a Turkified typonym deriving from the original name of the area: "Banak". Banak means "army" in Armenian, while banaki means "camp" in Georgian. It possibly takes its origin from a site in the Berdats Por district of Tayk – then a hereditary Mamikonian fiefdom – where the royal army (Արքունի բանակ, Ark'uni Banak) was headquartered during the rule of the Arshakuni in the 1st century.

== History ==
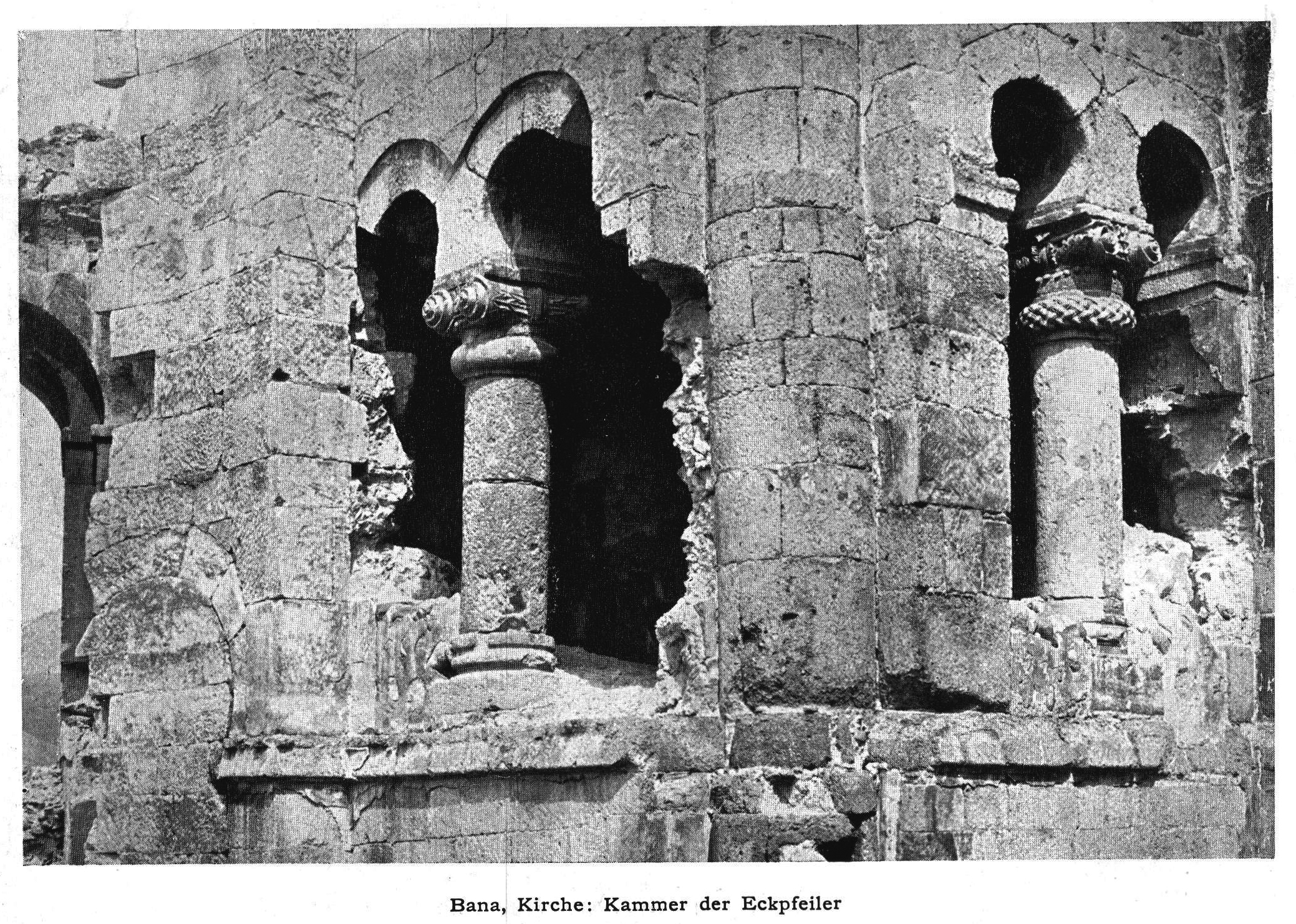
Old photo of Bana church, published in 1919

The dating of the Bana cathedral is a subject of scholarly debate. The Bana cathedral is mentioned in the 11th-century chronicle of Sumbat Davitis Dze, who reports that the Georgian prince Adarnase IV (r. 881–923) ordered the building of the church of Bana "by the hand" of Kwirike, who subsequently became the first bishop of Bana. While the scholars such as Ekvtime Takaishvili, Shalva Amiranashvili, and Stepan Mnatsakanian tend to interpret the passage literally, Chubinashvili, Vakhtang Beridze and Tiran Marutyan identify Adarnase as a renovator, not a builder of the church. This view, now shared by some art scholars, dates the Bana church – clearly modeled on the contemporaneous Zvartnots cathedral near Yerevan – to the mid-7th century. It was when the Chalcedonian-Armenian catholicos Nerses III, who presided over several important religious projects Zvartnots included, resided in exile in Tayk c. 653–58.

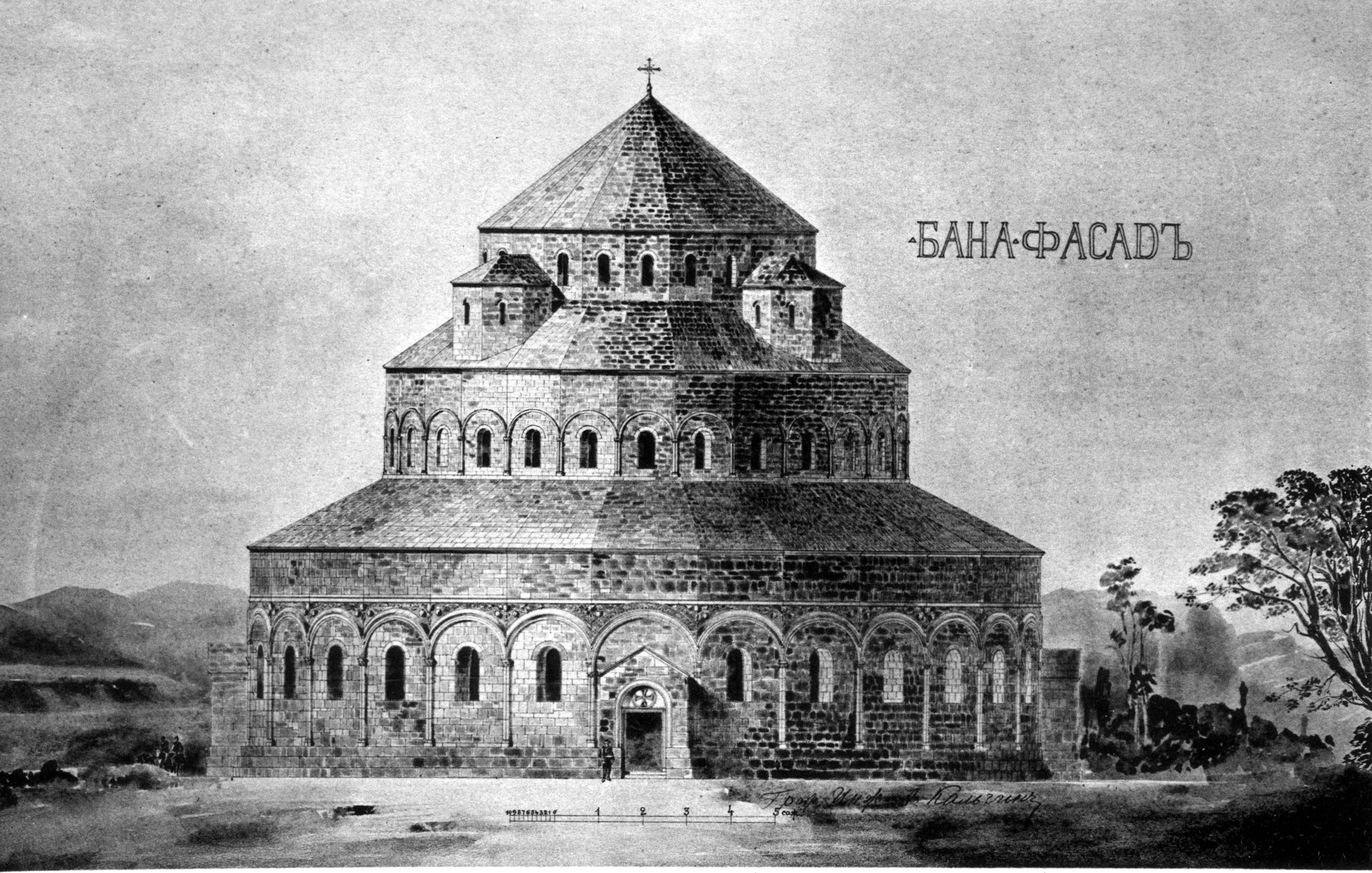
A hypothetical reconstruction of Bana by the Russian architect Anatoly Kalgin, 1907

Devastated during the 8th century by the Byzantine–Arab war, the region of Tao was gradually resettled by its new masters, the Georgian Bagratids, and under their patronage a monastic revival took place. With the settlements gradually expanding from the predominantly Georgian-populated north to the predominantly Armenian populated south and south-west, the Georgian princes reconstructed a number of monasteries abandoned by Armenians and built new foundations.

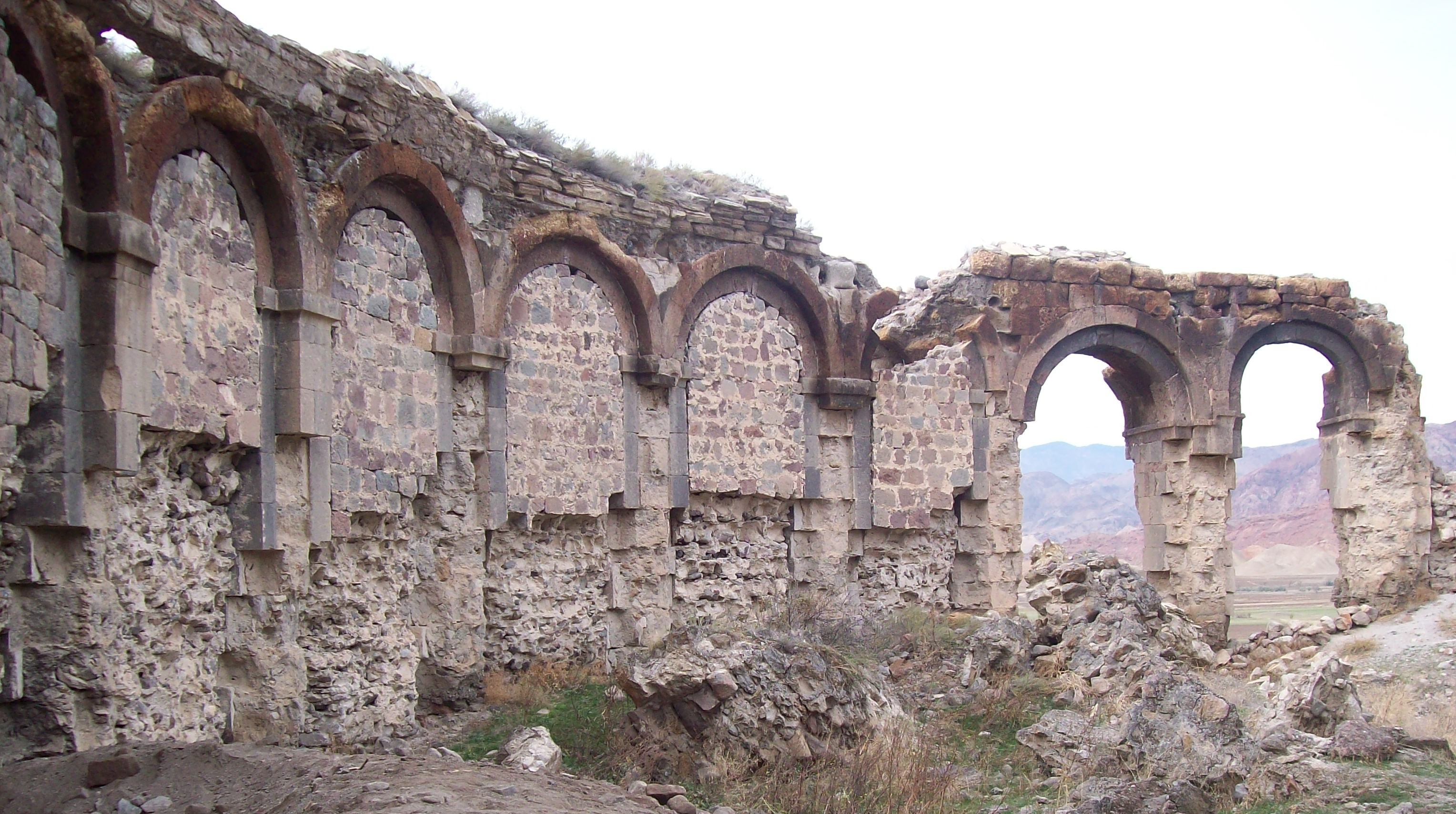
The arched outer wall of the ambulatory

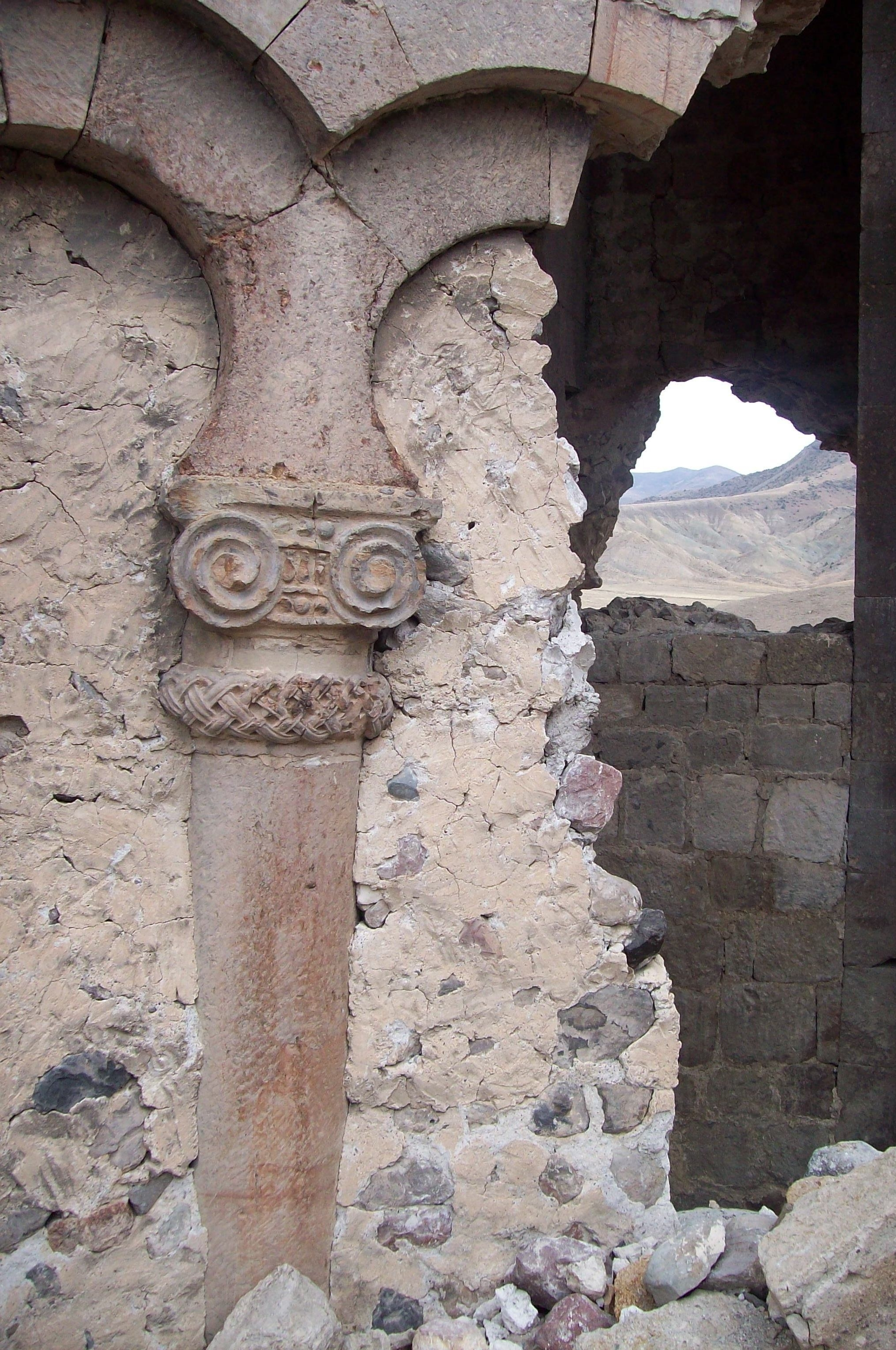
The sole surviving aisle column with its carved capital

From the time of Adarnase IV's reconstruction, the cathedral of Bana was one of the principal royal churches of the Bagrationi dynasty. It was used for the coronation of Bagrat IV in 1027 and his marriage to Helena, a niece of the Byzantine emperor Romanos III Argyros in 1032. In the 15th century, King Vakhtang IV (r. 1442–1446) and his consort khatun were buried at Bana. It was also the seat of the Georgian Orthodox bishop of Bana, whose diocese also included the neighboring areas of Taos-Kari, Panaskerti, and Oltisi. With the Ottoman conquest of the area in the 16th century, Bana was abandoned by Christians. During the Crimean War (1853–1865), the Ottoman military converted the church into a fortress, adding the crude bulwark still visible on the south side. During the Russo-Turkish war of 1877–78, it was shelled by the Russian artillery, blasting the dome off and inflicting severe damage on the edifice. Later the Russians carted off much of masonry to build a late 19th-century church in Oltu.

The church was first described and sketched by the German botanist Karl Koch in 1843. He declared it the most remarkable church in the East after the Hagia Sophia. Koch was followed by the Russian ethnographer Yevgeny Veidenbaum in 1879 and the Georgian historian Dimitri Bakradze in 1881. The latter two found the church already without a dome, but reported about still surviving frescos and a Georgian inscription in the Asomtavruli script. From 1902 to 1907, the ruins of Bana were scrupulously studied by an expedition led by the Georgian archaeologist Ekvtime Taqaishvili. Inaccessible to Soviet nationals, the monument was a subject of study of some Western scholars during the Cold War era. In 1983 the American archaeologist and art historian, Dr. Robert W. Edwards, completed a scientific assessment of the complex as well as an accurate plan drawn to scale.

== Architecture ==
Bana is an interpretation of the tetraconch-in-ambulatory (aisled tetraconch) design that was probably influenced by the "Golden Octagon" at Antioch. Bana was a large tetraconch with three-tiered choirs and arcades in the lower parts of each apse. The tetraconch was contained in a continuous polygonal ambulatory, almost a rotunda, with a diameter of 37.45m and with façades adorned with colonnades. The interior was essentially a large pyramid formed by the exterior polygon, tetraconch and the cupola resting upon a cylindrical drum. The pylons, located between the arms of the tetraconch, accommodated galleries on three levels.

The lower portions of each of the four apses, rather than having an unbroken wall, opened through arches into the surrounding ambulatory. The building was more than 30 m tall. The architectural details are notable for high craftsmanship and artistry. Round pillars, located within the span of the apses and galleries, were provided with capitals adorned with volutes. The façade had a blind arcade along its perimeter, the arches adorned with floral ornaments. What remains of the church is part of the lower-level floor half-submerged in its own ruins, including the east apse with one column of its colonnade with a carved capital.

The 1983 expedition made several remarkable discoveries. It is now certain that the church had two majors periods of construction. The first, which created the basic plan that survives today, had three phases (or re-modelings) that undoubtedly extended over many decades. The masonry was a uniform, well-cut ashlar that served as an inner and outer facing for a poured concrete core. At some period prior to the 19th century the church suffered a major structural failure (perhaps an earthquake) that necessitated the rebuilding and stabilization of the walls with a coarse masonry and massive amounts of mortar. The exterior windows of the ambulatory as well as the spaces between arches and columns were crudely filled. A square solid buttress with the identical coarse masonry was added at the east to support the apse and walls. There is no structural evidence that the Ottomans converted the church into a fortress during the Crimean War (e.g., adding open portals for guns and cannons or a surrounding circuit wall). During the 1870s Turkish troops and small arms were billeted there when the Russian attack inflicted substantial damage. Only formal excavations can determine the precise building periods and the origin of the builder(s).

== Reconstruction in Georgia ==
On December 9, 2016, in the Patriarchate of the Georgian Orthodox Church was held a presentation of Bana cathedral reconstruction project with an already existing model of the cathedral. As it is planned, the cathedral will be built in the east Georgian town khashuri.
