= Qarah Benas =

Qarah Benas قره بناس
- Village
- Location within Iran
- Coordinates: 34°23′52″N 47°57′12″E
- Country: Iran
- Province: Kermanshah
- County: Kangavar
- Bakhsh: Central
- Rural District: Khezel-e Gharbi

Population (2006)
  - Total: 292
- Time zone: UTC+3:30 (IRST)
  - Summer (DST): UTC+4:30 (IRDT)

Qarah Benas (Persian: قره بناس, also Romanized as Qarah Benās, Qareh Banās, and Qareh Benās; also known as Gareh Banās and Qaraha Bughaz) is a village in Khezel-e Gharbi Rural District, in the Central District of Kangavar County, Kermanshah Province, Iran. At the 2006 census, its population was 292, in 65 families.
