= Turkoman invasions of Georgia =

15th-century invasions of Georgia

- Georgian Kingdom in 1460, bordering Qara Qoyunlu to the south.
Date	1407–1502
Location	Georgia, eastern Anatolia, western Iran
Result	Georgian victory

Belligerents
Kingdom of Georgia (1407–1490); Kingdom of Kartli (1490–1502); Kingdom of Kakheti (1490–1502); Shirvanshah (in 1412); Safavid Empire (1502)	Qara Qoyunlu (1407–1468); Aq Qoyunlu (1468–1502)

Commanders and leaders
(Kingdom of Georgia) George VII (PKIA) (Kingdom of Georgia) Constantine I (executed); Ibrahim I (POW) (Kingdom of Georgia) Alexander I (Kingdom of Georgia) Vakhtang IV (Kingdom of Georgia) Bagrat VI (Kingdom of Georgia) Constantine II (Safavid Iran) Ismail I	Qara Yusuf; Jahan Shah; Uzun Hasan; Ya'qub Beg; Sufi Khalil Beg Mawsilu

The Turcoman invasions of Georgia also Georgian–Turcoman wars, refers to invasions of various Muslim Turkoman tribes on the territory of the Kingdom of Georgia throughout the 15th century

== Background ==
After the devastating invasions by Timur and subsequent enfeeblement of the Kingdom of Georgia, it soon faced a new threat. Timur's death in 1405 marked the beginning of the end of his Empire, unified only by fear and blood of the subjected peoples. Turkomans, particularly the Qara Qoyunlu clan, were among the first to rebel against Miran Shah (Timurid dynasty) Miran Shah who ruled of the Western Persia. Qara Yusuf, ruler of the Qara Qoyunlu, defeated Ahmed Jalayir, captured Baghdad, and repulsed Timurids from western Persia. After they established themselves as the new leading power in the middle east.

== Qara Yusuf's invasions of Georgia ==
They took advantage of the temporary weakness of the Georgians and launched attacks against them as early as 1407 during which Qara Yusuf took 15,000 prisoners and killed George VII of Georgia. Constantine I of Georgia, fearing further encroachment, allied himself with the Shirvanshah Ibrahim I to counter Turkoman advance and engaged them in the Battle of Chalagan, in which he was defeated and taken captive. In captivity Constantine behaved very proudly, which infuriated Qara Yusuf to such an extent, that he ordered his, his half-brother David's and 300 Georgian nobles' execution. Alexander I of Georgia who sought to strengthen and restore his declining Kingdom, faced constant invasions by the tribal Turkomans. They sacked Akhaltsikhe, city of the vital regional importance in 1416, in response of suggested oppression of Muslims.

== Alexander's reconquests ==
Alexander reconquered Lori from the Turkomans in 1431, which was of great importance in securing of the Georgian borders. Around 1434/5, Alexander encouraged the Armenian prince Beshken II Orbelian to attack the Qara Qoyunlu clansmen in Syunik and, for his victory, granted him Lori under terms of vassalage.

== Jahan Shah's first invasion of Georgia ==
In 1440, Alexander refused to pay tribute to Jahan Shah of the Qara Qoyunlu. In March, Jahan Shah surged into Georgia with 20,000 troops, destroyed the city of Samshvilde and sacked the capital city Tbilisi. He massacred 8,000 and enslaved 9,000 in Tbilisi, put heavy indemnity on Georgia, and returned to Tabriz.

== Jahan Shah's second invasion of Georgia ==
In 1444, Jahan Shah, attempted a new invasion of Georgia. King Vakhtang IV met him in Akhaltsikhe, where the Georgians and Turkomans fought in a bloody battle that ended without a clear victor. At night, Jahan Shah and his troops escaped to Tabriz, putting an end to the Turkoman incursion.

== Uzun Hasan's invasions of Georgia ==
As a result of foreign and internal struggles, unified Kingdom of Georgia ceased to exist after 1466 and was subdivided into several political units. The Qara Qoyunlu tribal confederation was destroyed by Aq Qoyunlu, their kin tribesmen who formed another confederation, which was similar in many ways to its predecessor. Aq Qoyunlu Turkomans naturally took advantage of the Georgian fragmentation. Georgia was at least twice attacked by Uzun Hasan, the prince of the Aq Qoyunlu in 1466, 1472 and possibly 1476-7. Bagrat VI of Georgia, temporary ruler of most of Georgia at the time, had to make peace with the invaders, abandoning Tbilisi to the enemy.

== Yaqub's invasions of Georgia ==
In 1486, the Georgian cities of Dmanisi and Kveshi were attacked by the troops of sultan Yaqub. But in the fortresses they were met by the soldiers of Sulkhan Baratashvili, who fought courageously and defeated the enemy. After the departure of the main forces of Yaqub shah, King Constantine took advantage of the favorable situation and exterminated the Turkomans in the surrounding area.

In 1488, sultan Yaqub sent his commander Sufi Khalil Beg Mawsilu to Georgia to build the fortresses of Kaoziani and Agdzhakala. Having learned about this, Constantine sent his troops led by Sulkhan Baratashvili to Khalil beg. Sulkhan defeated the troops of Khalil Beg. Then the Shah sent a huge army to Georgia, which immediately besieged Tbilisi. King Constantine set out from Imereti and sent Kaikhosro Tsitsishvili and Javakh Javakhashvili to help Baratashvili. Having united Tsitsishvili, Javakhishvili and Baratashvili attacked the Shah’s troops at Chandari. A battle took place near Chandari which ended in complete victory for the Georgians. Having learned about the defeat of the army at Chandari, the Shah's troops lifted the siege of Tbilisi. Tsitsishvili, Javakhishvili and Baratashvili rushed after them, caught up with them and beat them badly. After Constantine left Imereti, Alexander II with the Svans captured Kutaisi (1489). He reconciled with Liparit Dadiani and Gurieli, after which all of Imereti was in his hands.

In 1490, the king learned that the Shah’s troops were coming to Kartli. Constantine asked for help to Atabeg of Samtskhe Qvarqvare II and the King of Kakheti Alexander I, but they refused. Soon the Shah's troops approached the Orbeti fortress, but were unable to take it and moved towards the Kojori fortress. The defenders of the Kojori fortress abandoned it at night. The Shah's troops, having destroyed the fortress, moved to Tbilisi. The Shah's troops, having besieged Tbilisi, sent a detachment of 1,500 horsemen and other soldiers to devastate the surrounding area of Orbeti. Following them was an army of Kartlians led by Sulkhan Baratashvili. They quickly caught up with the detachment and defeated it. Merab Baratashvili managed to capture a relative of the Shah. Having learned about the destruction of the detachment, the Shah's troops once again lifted the siege of Tbilisi and withdrew from Kartli. After the departure of the Shah's troops, king Constantine exterminated the nomads in the vicinity, and also destroyed the fortresses of Agdzhakala and Kaoziani.

== Georgian–Safavid Alliance ==
Ismail I, founder of the Safavid dynasty, formed an alliance with the Georgians in 1502 and decisively defeated Aq Qoyunlu in the same year, destroying their state and marking the end of their invasions.

== Sources ==
- Kouymjian, Dickran (1997). "Armenia from the Fall of the Cilician Kingdom (1375) to the Forced Emigration under Shah Abbas (1604)". In Hovannisian, Richard (ed.). The Armenian People from Ancient to Modern Times. Vol. 2. St. Martin Press. pp. 1–50.
- Savory, Roger (1998). "ESMĀʿĪL I ṢAFAWĪ". Encyclopaedia Iranica, Vol. VIII, Fasc. 6. pp. 628–636.
- Savory, Roger (2007). Iran under the Safavids. Cambridge University Press. pp. 1–288. ISBN 978-0521042512.
- Brosset, Marie-Félicité (1849). Histoire de la Géorgie depuis l'Antiquité jusqu'au XIXe siècle. Volume I [History of Georgia from Ancient Times to the 19th Century, Volume 1] (in French). Saint-Petersburg: Imperial Academy of Sciences.
- Rayfield, Donald (2012). Edge of Empires, a History of Georgia. London: Reaktion Books. ISBN 978-1-78023-070-2.
- Woods, John E. (1999). The Aqquyunlu: Clan, Confederation, Empire (Revised and Expanded ed.). University of Utah Press. ISBN 978-0874805659.
