= Subhrangsu Kanta Acharyya =

Indian geologist

- Born: 27 November 1940 (age 85); Mymensingh, British India
- Known for: Geological studies of the Himalayas and Indo-Burmese region
- Awards: 1984 Shanti Swarup Bhatnagar Prize
- Scientific career
- Fields: Geodynamics; Gondwana geology; Himalayan geology; Tectonics
- Workplaces: Jadavpur University; Geological Survey of India

Subhrangsu Kanta Acharyya (born 27 November 1940) is an Indian geologist and a former director general of the Geological Survey of India. He is known for his geological studies of the Himalayas and the Indo-Burmese belt which assisted the later-day hydrocarbon and mineral explorations in the region. Born in Mymensingh of the present-day Bangladesh, he has served as a professor at Jadavpur University.

S. K. Acharyya has authored one book, Coal and Lignite Resources of India: An Overview co-edited another, Late Palaeozoic and Early Mesozoic Circum-Pacific Events and their Global Correlation and has published several peer-reviewed articles. It was under his supervision, the Geological map of India and the Seismotectonic Atlas of India and its Environs were prepared. He is an elected fellow of the Indian Institute of Chemical Biology, and the National Academy of Sciences, India. The Council of Scientific and Industrial Research, the apex agency of the Government of India for scientific research, awarded him the Shanti Swarup Bhatnagar Prize for Science and Technology, one of the highest Indian science awards for his contributions to Earth, Atmosphere, Ocean and Planetary Sciences in 1984.

== See also ==
- Gondwana
