= Syunik =

Syunik may refer to:

- Siunia dynasty, ancient Armenian noble family.
- Syunik (historic province), the 9th province of the historic Kingdom of Armenia.
- Kingdom of Syunik, medieval Armenian kingdom dependent to Bagratid Armenia, Kingdom of Georgia and Mongol Empire.
- Syunik (village), a village in Syunik Province.
- Syunik Province, an administrative entity in Armenia.
