= Kanta (surname) =

Kanta is a Hungarian surname. Notable people with the surname include:

- József Kanta (born 1984), Hungarian football player and coach
- Szabolcs Kanta (born 1982), Hungarian football player
