= Shamadavle Dadiani =

Duke of Mingrelia
- Reign: 1470–1474
- Predecessor: Liparit I Dadiani
- Successor: Vameq II Dadiani
- Died: 1474
- Burial: Khobi Monastery
- Spouse: Anna
- Issue: Liparit II Dadiani
- House: Dadiani
- Father: Liparit I Dadiani
- Religion: Georgian Orthodox Church (Catholicate of Abkhazia)

Shamadavle Dadiani (also Shamandavle or Shamandavla; Georgian: შამადავლე დადიანი; died 1474) was a member of the House of Dadiani and eristavi ("duke") of Odishi (Mingrelia) in western Georgia from 1470 until his death. He succeeded his father Liparit I Dadiani and continued his predecessors' efforts to garner more autonomy as the united Kingdom of Georgia was approaching to its end.

== Biography ==
Shamadavle was the elder son of Liparit I Dadiani, on whose death he succeeded as the eristavi of Odishi in 1470. As the surviving documents reveal he styled himself as the "great eristavt-eristavi ("duke of dukes") Dadiani-Gurieli". Of these title-turned-surnames, the former signified his rule in Odishi and the latter emphasized his suzerainty over Guria, a fief of the secundogeniture of the Dadiani in possession of Shamadavle's younger brother, Mamia Gurieli, and his progeny. His other titles were those of the eristavi of the Svans and of mandaturtukhutsesi ("Lord High Steward") of Imereti.

=== Political career ===
Like his father and predecessor, Shamadavle contributed to the final fragmentation of the Kingdom of Georgia; Liparit helped militarily to Bagrat II of Imereti to secede in western Georgia and Shamadavle assisted him in detaching the western Georgian church—the Catholicate of Abkhazia—from the Patriarchate of Mtskheta, thereby rendering the Georgian church divided into two for the following four centuries. This was done with the assistance of Michael IV, a Greek Patriarch of Antioch, who was touring Georgia to collect donations. Michael produced a canonical epistle in Georgian, declaring the Mingrelian bishop Joachim of Tsaishi and Bedia as catholicos under the tutelage of the See of Antioch.

=== European accounts ===
Accounts of Mingrelia of Shamadavle's times are found in the contemporary reports by the European visitors who testify an economical, social, and moral decline in the war-torn Georgian states. Shamadavle was the unnamed son of the Mingrelian ruler (Bendia, Rex Mingraeliae cum suo filio) mentioned in the Latin correspondence related to the proposed crusade of Pope Pius II against the Ottomans in 1460. On 5 July 1474, the Venetian Ambrogio Contarini had an audience with the ruler of Mingrelia called Bendian, whom he described as a handsome man of about 50, but was surprised at his manners: they were "those of a madman". A year later, in July 1475, the Venetian found him dead and Mingrelia in disorder. The Bendian of these accounts is a rendition of Bendiani, a title of the Dadiani, while the man whom Contarini met was Shamadavle, who, indeed, died in 1474 as reported by Prince Vakhushti of Kartli in his chronicle. He was buried in the Khobi Monastery, the Dadiani's burial ground.

== Family ==
Shamadavle was married to a certain Anna, who is known from an inscription first published by the French Orientalist Marie-Félicité Brosset. He had a son, Liparit II Dadiani, the future ruler of Mingrelia. Shamadavle was succeeded by his uncle, Vameq II Dadiani.

Shamadavle Dadiani House of Dadiani Born: ? Died: 1474
Regnal titles
Preceded by Liparit I Dadiani	Duke of Mingrelia; 1470–1474	Succeeded by Vameq II Dadiani
