= Vameq II Dadiani =

Georgian nobleman

Duke of Mingrelia
- Reign: 1474–1482
- Predecessor: Shamadavle
- Successor: Liparit II
- Died: 1482
- House: Dadiani
- Father: Mamia II Dadiani
- Religion: Georgian Orthodox Church

Vameq II Dadiani (Georgian: ვამეყ II დადიანი; died 1482) was a member of the House of Dadiani and eristavi ("duke") of Odishi (Mingrelia) in western Georgia from 1474 until his death in 1482.

== Biography ==
Vameq was the younger son of Mamia II Dadiani, brother of Liparit I, and a paternal uncle of Shamadavle, on whose death he succeeded as duke of Mingrelia in 1474. The circumstances of Vameq's accession are not specifically mentioned in the Georgian sources, but the Venetian patrician Ambrogio Contarini, arriving in Mingrelia in July 1475, found the country in troubles occasioned by the death of its ruler. According to Prince Vakhushti's chronicle, Vameq's status was confirmed by his royal suzerain, King Bagrat II of Imereti. As Bagrat grew stronger by expanding his sway into eastern Georgia, over Kartli, Vameq was anxious to protect his autonomy from the crown. In 1477, he took advantage of Bagrat's absence in Kartli and, in alliance with the Abkhazians and Gurians, attacked Imereti. Defeated by the returning king, Vameq sued for peace and begged Bagrat to leave him as duke in exchange of an oath of loyalty. Bagrat granted his pardon and had Vameq accompany him in a renewed campaign in Kartli.

Bagrat's death in 1478 provided Vameq with the opportunity to avenge his humiliation by undermining an attempt by the late king's son, Alexander, to seize the crown and aiding the rival monarch, Constantine II of Georgia, in taking hold of Imereti in 1479. Vameq died in 1482 and was succeeded by his grandnephew, Liparit II Dadiani.

Vameq II Dadiani House of Dadiani Born: ? Died: 1482
Regnal titles
Preceded by Shamadavle Dadiani	Duke of Mingrelia; 1474–1482	Succeeded by Liparit II Dadiani
