= Kingdom of Kartli =

Georgian kingdom (1478–1762)

Kingdom of Kartli ქართლის სამეფო kartlis samepo
- 1478–1762
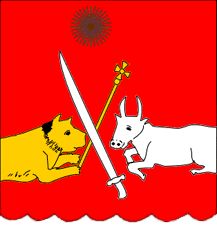
- Coat of arms according to Prince Vakhushti's Atlas (c. 1745)

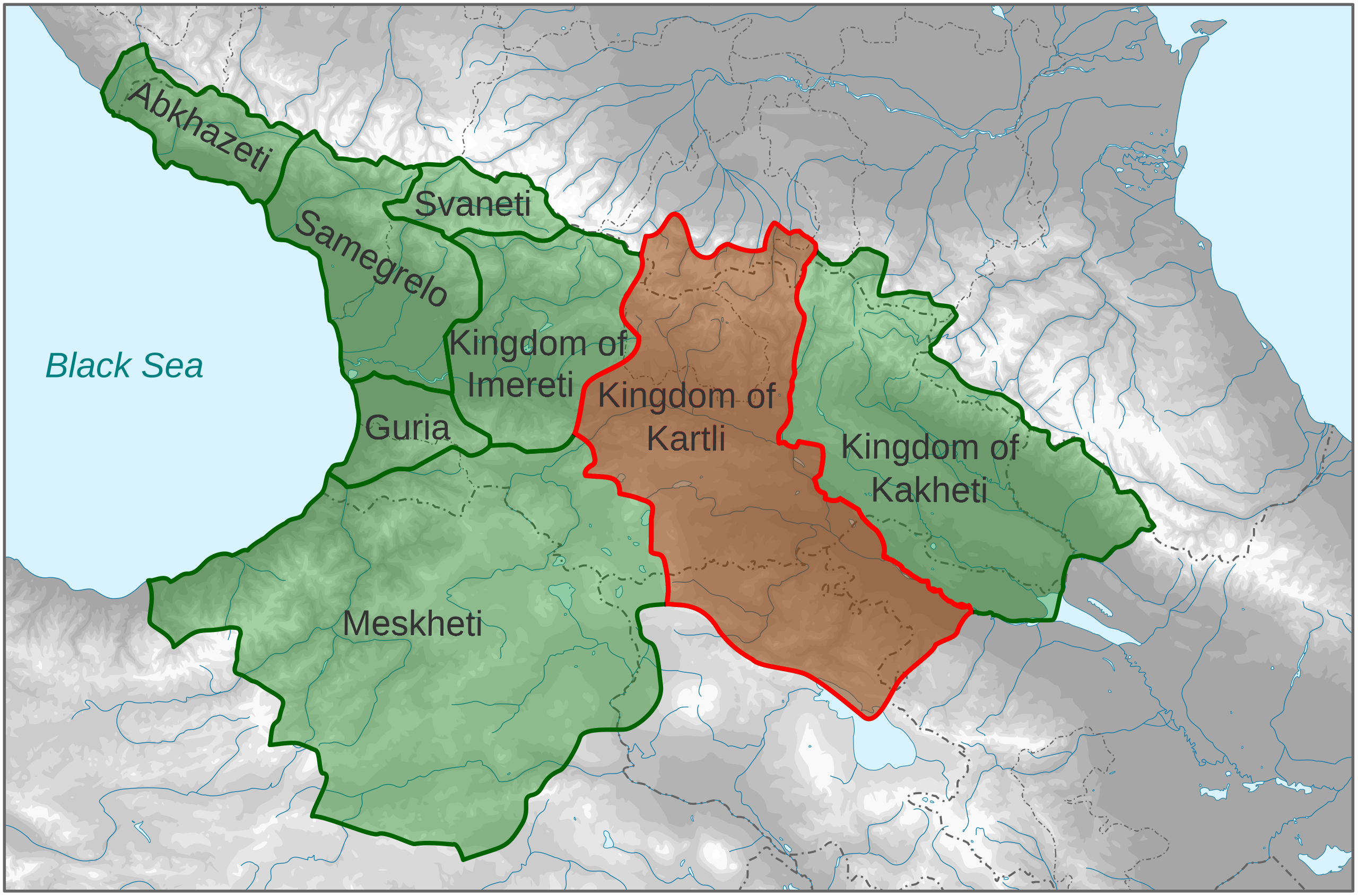
- Kingdom of Kartli after Georgia's dissolution as a unified state, 1490 AD
- Capital: Tbilisi; 41°43′21″N 44°47′33″E
- Common languages: Georgian (numismatics) (chancery); Persian (numismatics) (Note: "King Vakhtang VI (r. 1716–24), Teimuraz’s successor as ruler of Kartli and resister of the Safavids, continued to imbue his poetry with Persian metaphors and symbols, while his own successor Teimuraz II (r. 1732–44 in Kakheti, 1744–62 in Kartli) translated the tale of Sindbad (as Timsariani) from Persian. Their coinage was also issued with both Georgian and Persian script.") (chancery)
- Religion: Georgian Orthodox Church
- Government: Kingdom
- King
  - 1478–1505: Constantine II (first)
  - 1744–1762: Teimuraz II (last)
- Historical era: Early modern period
  - Established: 1478
  - Vassal state of Persia: 1555–1578; (Note: "On 7 August 1578 Lala Paşa’s army started moving down the left bank of the Kura; ... A fortnight later, Lala Paşa was at Tbilisi’s gates. The Iranian puppet king, Daud-Khan, meant to resist, but the population fled to the forests, where Ottoman soldiers hunted them down, and Daud-Khan fled, too. Kartli was now ruled by Vakhtang, the son of Bagrat Mukhranbatoni, but, with other aristocrats – Bardzim Amilakhori, Elizbar, duke of Ksani – Vakhtang Mukhranbatoni surrendered to Lala Mustafa Paşa. Tbilisi became a paşalık; Gori, a sanjak; and Kartli’s major castles had Ottoman garrisons. The Ottomans headed for Imeretia, but their men were slaughtered by King Giorgi’s army in the Likhi passes ... In 1590 the Iranians signed a peace treaty conceding virtually all Georgia, Armenia and Azerbaijan to the Ottomans") 1612 (Note: "After several journeys across Anatolia, and renewed attacks by Abbas, in 1612 she persuaded the sultan, despite the warmongering factions at court, to accept reinstatement of the 1555 Amasya Treaty excluding the Ottomans from Kartli and Kakhetia.")–1723; (Note: "In spring 1723 Konstantine used Iranian soldiers to capture Tbilisi; Vakhtang fled to Tskhinvali. The Paşa of Erzurum told Vakhtang to submit to the sultan, if he wanted to be king of Kartli: the darbazi advised capitulation. Second Lieutenant Tolstoi still insisted that Tsar Peter was coming; Vakhtang merely pretended to accept the sultan’s terms. On 12 June an Ottoman army bloodlessly took Tbilisi from Konstantine. Vakhtang bribed the Ottoman commander Ibrahim Paşa to disarm Konstantine and install Vakhtang’s son Bakar as Kartli’s governor. For a few weeks Bakar and Konstantine both resisted the Ottomans, but soon fled, Konstantine eventually converting to Islam and becoming Ottoman vassal king of Kakhetia.") 1736–1747
  - Vassal state of Ottoman Empire: 1578–1612; 1723–1736 (Note: "In 1736 Turkey, at war with both Austria and Russia, gave up Kartli and Kakhetia.")
  - Union of Kartli and Kakheti: 1762
Preceded by	Succeeded by
Kingdom of Georgia	Kingdom of Kartli-Kakheti
- Today part of: Armenia; Georgia; Russia; Azerbaijan

The Kingdom of Kartli (Georgian: ქართლის სამეფო, romanized: kartlis samepo) was a late medieval and early modern monarchy in eastern Georgia, centred on the province of Kartli, with its capital at Tbilisi. It emerged in the process of a tripartite division of the Kingdom of Georgia in 1478 and existed, with several brief intervals, until 1762 when Kartli and the neighbouring Georgian kingdom of Kakheti were merged through dynastic succession under the Kakhetian branch of the Bagrationi dynasty. Through much of this period, the kingdom was a vassal of the successive dynasties of Iran, and to a much shorter period Ottoman Empire, but enjoyed intermittent periods of greater independence, especially after 1747.

== History ==
=== Disintegration of the Kingdom of Georgia into warring states ===
From circa 1450, in the Kingdom of Georgia rival movements arose among competing feudal factions within the royal house and nobility. These caused a high degree of instability across the entire territory of the kingdom. This period was characterised by feudal competition, separatism, and civil war.

Major disintegration of the Georgian kingdom dates from 1463 with the defeat of George VIII at the Battle of Chikhori by the rebellious nobleman Bagrat. The latter destroyed any outward vestige of Georgian national unity by proclaiming himself the King of Imereti. This move led to the beginning of the wholesale disintegration of the former united Georgian monarchy and state. This devolution was to be repeated in various forms for rest of the collective history of this region.

In the aftermath of his 1465 defeat, George VIII was captured by Qvarqvare II Jaqeli, Prince of Samtskhe (Meskheti). Sensing an opportunity, Bagrat VI crossed the borders of East Georgia (inner Kartli) and proclaimed himself King of all Georgia in 1466.

Qvarqvare, fearing that Bagrat was gaining too much power, released George VIII from captivity, but the deposed king was unable to reclaim his former crown. He only managed to proclaim himself King of Kakheti, a rump state. This left Lower Kartli to his nephew, Constantine, another pretender to the throne. Constantine established himself as a de facto ruler over part of Kartli in 1469, challenging Bagrat's hegemony.

Bagrat VI continued to rule Kartli until 1478, when he was again challenged by Constantine.

=== Developments in western Georgia ===
Alexander son of Bagrat VI retired to the mountainous western provinces of Racha and Lechkhumi, from which he tried to ascend the throne of Imereti. He summoned "Dadiani, Gurieli, Sharvashidze and Gelovani" to attend his coronation, but headed by Vameq II Dadiani, the latter refused to support him and instead invited Constantine to Western Georgia.

With the help of the local dukes, Constantine took Kutaisi and briefly restored the integrity of Kartli with Western Georgia. In 1481, Constantine managed to subordinate Samtskhe and thus proclaimed himself King of All Georgia.

Rival factions, however, continued to struggle to gain the upper hand.

In 1483, Qvarqvare II declared war on Constantine and defeated the royal forces at Ardeti. In 1484, the demoted former heir, Alexander, proclaimed himself king of Imereti (Western Georgia). Meanwhile, the new feudal overlord of Odishi - Liparit II Dadiani invited Constantine II to West Georgia for a second time.

In 1487, Constantine went to Imereti, but had to abandon the campaign when in 1486 [date problem] a Turkmen chieftain, Yaqub b. Uzun Hasan invaded Kartli and the king was forced to deal with the threat his incursion posed.

Alexander took advantage of this and captured Kutaisi and restored his authority in Imereti. Next, the king of Kartli effected a temporary reconciliation with the kings of Kakheti and Imereti, and the prince of Samtskhe, thereby forming the outright long-term division of Georgia into petty kingdoms and principalities.

=== Later developments ===
These new realms were not long at peace. Soon after coming into power, George II of Kakheti launched an expedition against Kartli, intending to depose King David X and conquer his kingdom. David's brother Bagrat successfully defended the kingdom and managed to capture George II in an ambush.

Peace did not survive long in the west either, as David X faced incursions from Alexander II of Imereti, who was somewhat less successful than his Kakhetian counterpart.

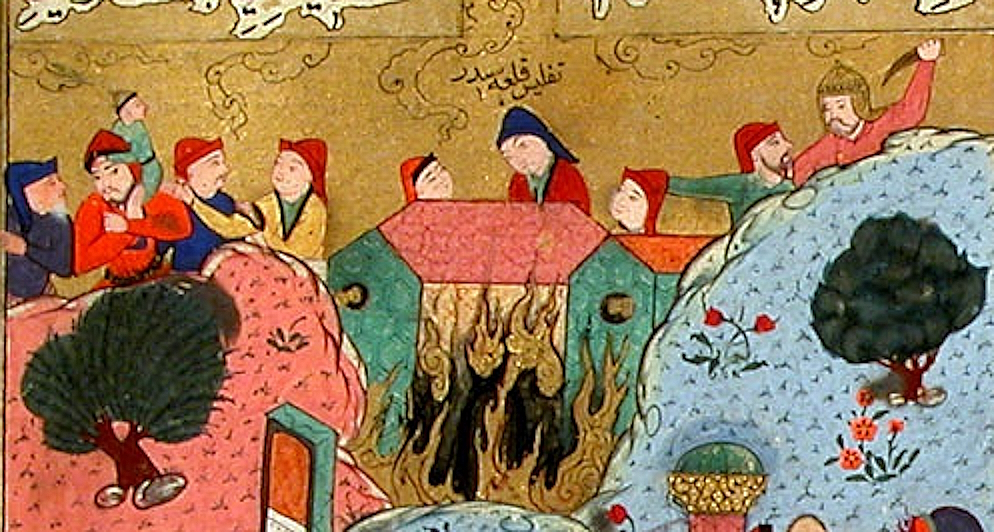
Capture of Tbilisi by the Ottomans in 21-24 August 1578, under Osman Pasha and Mustafa Pasha, following the departure of David XI ("Daud Khan") from the city, during the Ottoman–Safavid War (1578–1590). Secaatname (1586)

In 1513, the Kingdom of Kartli managed a short conquest of neighbouring Kakheti. In 1520, the Kingdom of Kakheti was restored with the support of local nobles by Levan of Kakheti, son and heir of George II. In 1522/24, Safavid Shah Ismail invaded Kartli occupying Tbilisi to suppress David X's revolt. It is believed the Iranians built a mosque in Tbilisi during this time. Georgian-Persian bilingual documents were one outcome of the policy of compromises. The 1540s saw the appearance of the first Persian documents in Georgia. The Persian text was frequently appended to Georgian deeds of gift pertaining to estates and other matters, dating to King Simon's reign.

The Peace of Amasya (1555) recognized Kartli, Kakheti, and eastern Samtskhe as Persian possessions, while everything to the west of it (i.e. Imereti, western Samtskhe) fell into Ottoman hands. During the next 150 years, Kartli was under vassalage of successive dynasties of Persia.

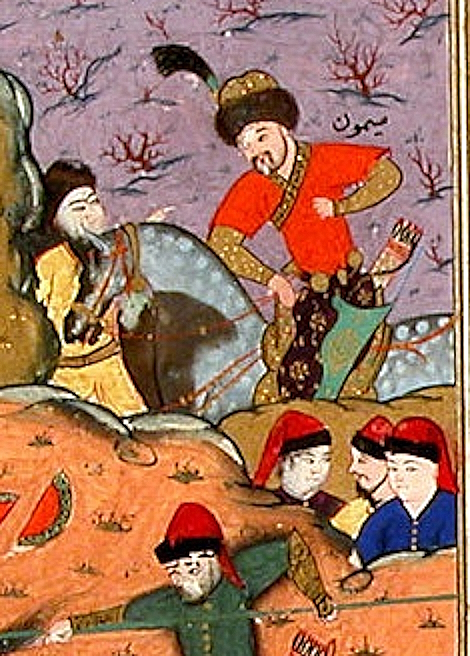
Simon I of Kartli (label Simun "سیمون" ) with his troops in a battle against Ottoman Erzurum troops in 1579-80. Secaatname (1586)

From 1578 and for more than 40 years this Georgian Kingdom was under suzerainty of Ottoman Empire. It regularly paid tribute and sent gifts (pīškeš) to the shah and sultan (Note: "In summer 1587 the sultan planned a ‘final blow’ against Simon and Manuchar: one army took Akhaltsikhe, the other headed for Tbilisi and Gori, forcing Simon into Samtskhe. With no active ally, despairing of any successful Iranian move, Simon, too, sued for peace. In exchange for annual tribute, Simon was recognized as a Christian king with full autonomy.") in the form of boys and girls for use as slaves; horses; and wines, thereby losing its true sovereignty.

=== Seventeenth century: Georgian petty kingdoms under Persian and Ottoman vassalage ===
In 1632, Rostom Khan, the illegitimate son of David XI (Daud Khan), was appointed as king/wali of Kartli. (Note: "ROSTOM KHAN (ca. 1565–1658). King of Kartli in 1632–1658; although nominally a wali (viceroy) of Kartli, he used the title of king in official correspondence and ceremonies.") Rostom, who had converted to Islam and previously had taken the name Khosrow Mirza, imported Persian language and culture into Kartlian administration and daily life. During his reign, Kartli experienced a growth in prosperity and trade, along with restoring damaged regions. Under Rostom, Kartli had a policy of religious tolerance, which included subsidized repairs to churches and monasteries, and the building of new mosques. Rostom died 17 November 1658 and was buried in Qom, Safavid Empire.

In 1747, the Shah of Persia, Nader Shah was assassinated. Capitalizing on this instability Teimuraz II and his son Heraclius II, who had been given the kingship of Kartli and Kakheti respectively by Nader Shah himself as a reward for their loyalty, declared their de facto independence from Persia.

After Teimuraz II's death in 1762, Irakli II assumed control over Kartli, thus unifying the two into the short-lived Kingdom of Kartli-Kakheti.

=== Extinction of Georgian quasi-independence and integration into the Russian Empire ===
Following the Treaty of Georgievsk (1783) and Agha Mohammad Khan Qajar's brief re-occupation of eastern Georgia, the Kingdom of Kartli-Kakheti was annexed by the Russian Empire in 1800. The former warring royal houses of the various Georgian kingdom were mostly incorporated into the Russian nobility, thereby losing their quasi-royal status, and becoming subsumed into the Russian empire's service nobility.

Russian control over Kartli-Kakheti was finalized with Qajar Iran by the Treaty of Gulistan of 1813.

== See also ==
- List of monarchs of Georgia
- Family tree of Bagrationi dynasty of Kartli

== Sources ==
- Green, Nile (2019). The Persianate World: The Frontiers of a Eurasian Lingua Franca. University of California Press.
- Melville, Charles (2021). Safavid Persia in the Age of Empires: The Idea of Iran. Bloomsbury. "In Kartli, by contrast, in order to rein in the non-compliant vassal David X, in 1522 (or 1524) the shah sent in troops, who brought Tbilisi under control. Perhaps it was at this time that the Iranians built a mosque in Tbilisi."
- Mikaberidze, Alexander (2015). "Rostom Khan (ca. 1565-1658)". Historical Dictionary of Georgia. Scarecrow Press. pp. 548–549.
- Rayfield, Donald (2013). Edge of Empires: A History of Georgia. Reaktion Books.
- Sanikidze, George (2021). "The Evolution of the Safavid Policy towards Eastern Georgia". In Melville, Charles (ed.). Safavid Persia in the Age of Empires: The Idea of Iran. Vol. 10. I.B. Tauris.
