= Mamia II Dadiani =

Duke of Mingrelia
- Reign: 1396–1414
- Predecessor: Vameq I Dadiani
- Successor: Liparit I Dadiani
- Died: 1414
- Issue: Liparit I Dadiani; Vameq II Dadiani
- House: Dadiani
- Father: Vameq I Dadiani
- Religion: Georgian Orthodox Church

Mamia II Dadiani (Georgian: მამია II დადიანი; died 1414) was a member of the House of Dadiani and eristavi ("duke") of Odishi, latter-day Mingrelia, in western Georgia from 1396 until his death.

== Biography ==
Mamia was the son of Vameq I Dadiani, eristavi of Odishi, on whose death he succeeded in 1396. During his tenure, the Kingdom of Georgia was subjected to repeated attacks by the Turco-Mongol emir Timur, which devastated the country and shattered its unity. The western Georgian provinces were claimed by scions of the former kings of Imereti, but their attempts to bend the Dadiani into submission went in vain. Mamia continued his predecessors' efforts to aggrandize the duchy of Odishi. In 1414, he went to war against the Abkhazians, but was killed in battle.

Mamia had two sons, Liparit I and Vameq II, both the future eristavi of Odishi. If Tedo Zhordania's identification, in 1902, of Mamia II with the eristavt-eristavi ("duke of dukes") and mandaturt-ukhutsesi ("Lord High Steward") Mamia Dadiani, mentioned in a Georgian inscription on the omophorion from the Mokvi Cathedral is correct, then his wife was called Elene. Mamia and his wife Ekaterine, formerly called Elene, are also mentioned in a memorial side-note in the 13th-century Gospel from Vardzia and, probably, also in a similar text in the 11th-century Gospel from Urbnisi, in which the unnamed Dadiani's wife Ekaterine, formerly Elene, is referred to as "a daughter of the king". The woman's double-name suggests her becoming a nun. Zhordania's hypothesis was challenged, in 2001, by the historian Bezhan Khorava, who identified the Mamia of these texts as Mamia III Dadiani, who died in 1533.

Mamia II Dadiani House of Dadiani Born: ? Died: 1414
Regnal titles
Preceded by Vameq I Dadiani	Duke of Mingrelia; 1396–1414	Succeeded by Liparit I Dadiani
