= Mamia III Dadiani =

Prince of Mingrelia
- Reign: 1512–1533
- Predecessor: Liparit II Dadiani
- Successor: Levan I Dadiani
- Died: 31 January 1533
- Spouse: Elisabed
- Issue: levan I Dadiani; Batulia
- House: Dadiani
- Father: Liparit II Dadiani
- Religion: Georgian Orthodox Church (Catholicate of Abkhazia)

Mamia III Dadiani (Georgian: მამია III დადიანი; died 31 January 1533) was a member of the House of Dadiani and eristavi ("duke") of Odishi, that is, Mingrelia, in western Georgia from 1512 until his death. Mamia was a son and successor of Liparit II Dadiani, who had emerged as a semi-independent ruler in the process of dissolution of the Kingdom of Georgia. Mamia was culturally active in Abkhazia and continued his predecessors' efforts to secure borders against the North Caucasian mountainous tribes of Zygia. His naval expedition against them and landing in Zygia ended in a fiasco and Mamia was killed in battle.

== Biography ==
=== Accession ===
Mamia was a son of Liparit II Dadiani on whose death he succeeded—according to the early 18th-century Georgian scholar Prince Vakhushti of Kartli—in 1512. This traditionally accepted date was challenged, in 2001, by the historian Bezhan Khorava, who dates Mamia's accession to c. 1503 on account of his being styled as Dadiani, that is, the ruler of Mingrelia, in a weregild charter issued by Alexander II of Imereti for the Svans in that year. By the time Mamia acceded to power, the medieval Kingdom of Georgia had disintegrated and the Dadiani had become largely autonomous, nominally under vassalage of the kings of Imereti.

=== Expedition in Zygia and death ===
In 1533, Mamia Dadiani, in conjunction with Mamia I Gurieli, eristavi of Guria, were encouraged by Bagrat III of Imereti to embark on a campaign against the piratical Circassian tribe of Zygii, whose vessels frequented the Black Sea littorals of Mingrelia and Guria. A combined navy landed the Mingrelian and Gurian forces on 30 January 1533. The first encounter with the fiercely defending Zygii was won by the allies, but, on the next day, many battle-fatigued Mingrelian nobles defected their lord at the instigation of Tsandia Inal-Ipa, an Abkhaz. The allies were routed; Mamia Dadiani was disarmed, stripped naked, and stabbed to death, while Mamia Gurieli was taken prisoner. Malachia I Abashidze, Catholicos of Imereti and Abkhazia, went to the Zygii and ransomed the survivors and bodies of those who died.

Prince Vakhushti errs in dating Mamia's expedition and his death to 1532, thus diverging from one of his sources, the so-called Parisian Chronicle, which gives Friday, 31 January 1533 as the date of his death. Friday, indeed, fell on 31 January 1533 according to the Julian calendar.

== Family ==
Mamia III Dadiani was married to a certain Elisabed, who is mentioned, with Mamia and their son, Levan, in a Georgian inscription of the cross from Bichvinta, in Abkhazia. If Bezhan Khorava's identification of Mamia III with the Mamia Dadiani of the text of the omophorion of Mokvi, also from Abkhazia, is correct, he could have been married also to Elene, probably as his first wife. This Elene, "a king’s daughter", would then become a nun under the name of Ekaterine as suggested by the contemporary textual documents.

Mamia had two sons:

- Levan I Dadiani (died 1572), who succeeded him as ruler of Mingrelia;
- Batulia (Datulia; died c. 1580), lord of Sajavakho, known from Prince Vakhushti's chronicle. His wife—a Circassian or Abkhazian noblewoman, a younger sister of George II of Imereti's queen consort Rusudan, according to the historian Cyril Toumanoff—was taken away from him by his own nephew, Giorgi III Dadiani. Batulia later plotted Giorgi's murder, but failed and fled to Guria, where he was incarcerated in Ozurgeti and strangled to death by Dadiani's agents.

Mamia III Dadiani House of Dadiani Born: ? Died: 31 January 1533
Regnal titles
Preceded by Liparit II Dadiani	Prince of Mingrelia; 1512–1533	Succeeded by Levan I Dadiani
