= Liparit I Dadiani =

Eristavi of Megrelia

Duke of Mingrelia
- Reign: 1414–1470
- Predecessor: Mamia II Dadiani
- Successor: Shamadavle Dadiani
- Died: 1470
- Issue: Shamadavle Dadiani; Mamia Gurieli
- House: Dadiani
- Father: Mamia II Dadiani
- Religion: Georgian Orthodox Church

Liparit I Dadiani (Georgian: ლიპარიტ I დადიანი; died 1470) was a member of the House of Dadiani and eristavi ("duke") of Odishi, latter-day Mingrelia, in western Georgia from 1414 until his death. Under his rule, Mingrelia became largely independent from the disintegrating Kingdom of Georgia in the 1460s.

== Biography ==
Liparit I Dadiani succeeded on the death of his father, Mamia II Dadiani, in a war with the Abkhazians in 1414. His accession was confirmed by Alexander I of Georgia, who then moved on to pacify the conflict between the Mingrelian and Abkhazian princes. In the course of Liparit's lengthy rule, Mingrelia was embroiled in a series of internecine conflicts which dealt final blows to Georgia's unity. The civil war subsided, but only briefly, by 1460, when the Italian envoy Ludovico da Bologna acted as an intercessor between the Georgian dynasts to enable their participation in the proposed crusade of Pope Pius II against the Ottoman menace. Among the Eastern Christian princes ready to take up arms, the contemporary Western European documents mention Bendia rex Mingreliae, who is the Liparit I of the Georgian sources; Bendia being a rendition of Bediani, a territorial epithet of the Dadiani, derived from the canton of Bedia.

In 1463, Liparit and other western Georgian dukes joined forces with the Georgian Bagratid prince Bagrat against George VIII, winning a decisive battle at Chikhori. Victorious, Bagrat was crowned King of Imereti, but he had to concede significant autonomy to his allies so that the only duties remaining to be performed by Dadiani were to accompany the king with his army in battle and hunting.

Liparit died in 1470. He was survived by two sons:

- Shamadavle Dadiani (died 1474), who succeeded Liparit in Mingrelia;
- Mamia Gurieli (fl. 1463), Duke of Guria and the founder of the continuous line of House of Gurieli.

Liparit I Dadiani House of Dadiani Born: ? Died: 1470
Regnal titles
Preceded by Mamia II Dadiani	Duke of Mingrelia; 1414–1470	Succeeded by Shamadavle Dadiani
