= Liparit II Dadiani =

Liparit II Dadiani (Georgian: ლიპარიტ II დადიანი; died 1512) was a member of the House of Dadiani and eristavi ("duke") of Odishi, that is, Mingrelia, in western Georgia from 1482 until his death.

Liparit was a son of Shamadavle Dadiani, eristavi of Odishi, by his wife, Anna. He succeeded on the death of his granduncle, Vameq II Dadiani, in 1482. In a multiparty civil war which plagued the crumbling Kingdom of Georgia at that time, Liparit maintained his predecessor's choice of supporting King Constantine II of Kartli against the rival prince, Alexander, who established himself as king of Imereti in 1484. Liparit invited Constantine to retake Imereti and aided him with his army to put Alexander into flight to the mountains of Racha in 1487. Next year, Constantine, attacked by the Ag Qoyunlu Turkomans in Kartli, was no more in a position to maintain himself in Imereti and Alexander was able to resume his reign. Liparit made peace with Alexander and continued to rule as his vassal, but with considerable autonomy. In 1491, Constantine II of Kartli reconciled himself with the fait accompli and recognized Alexander as king of Imereti, thereby consummating the dissolution of the Kingdom of Georgia.

Liparit II died in 1512 and was succeeded by his son, Mamia III. He possibly had also a daughter, Gulnar, who was married to Prince Abash Abashidze.

Liparit II Dadiani House of Dadiani Born: ? Died: 1512
Regnal titles
Preceded by Vameq II Dadiani	Duke, then Prince of Mingrelia; 1482–1512	Succeeded by Mamia III Dadiani
