= Battle of Chikhori =

1463 battle

Coordinates: 42°14′24″N 43°4′12″E

- Part of Georgian Civil War (1463–1490)
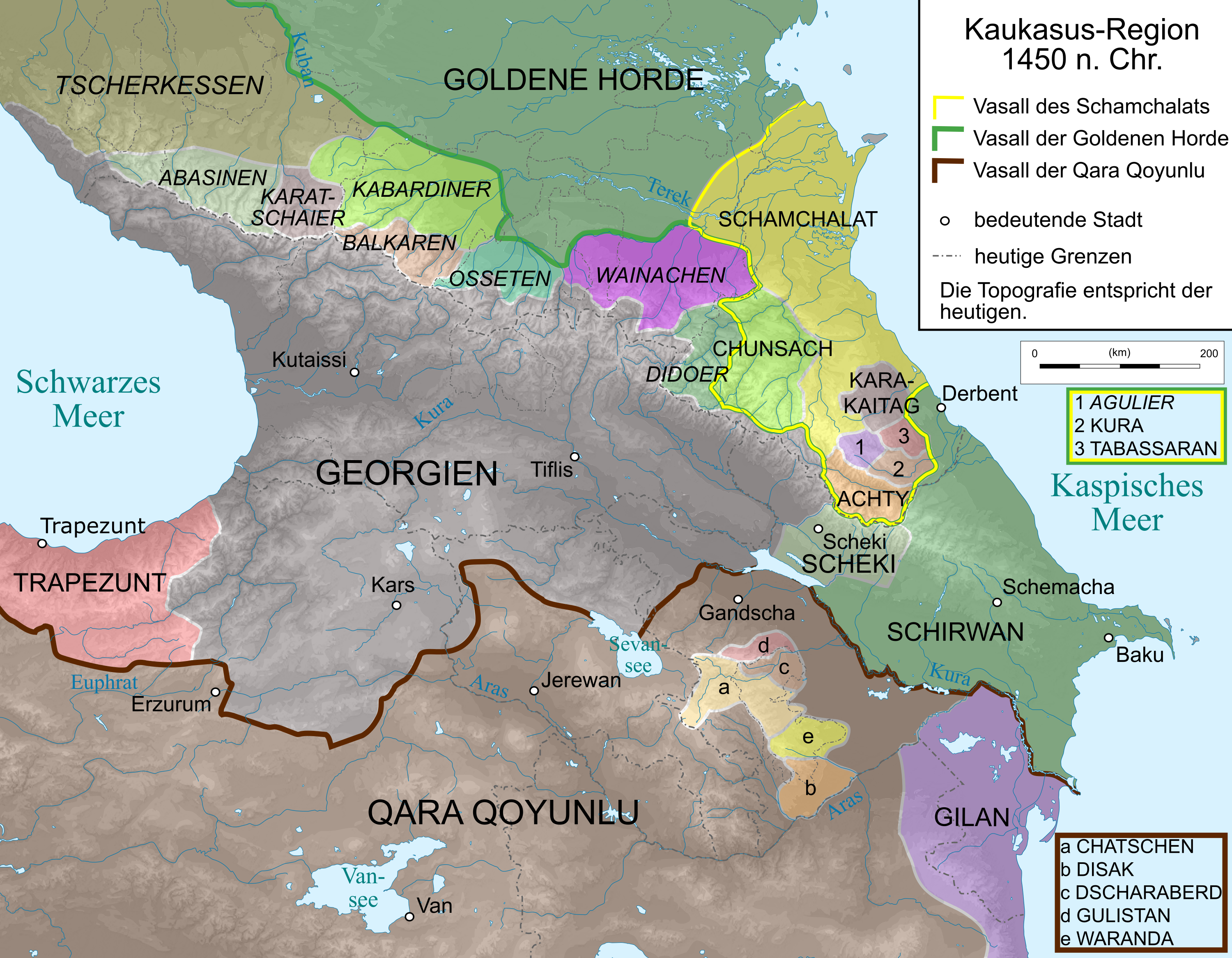
- Map of the Kingdom of Georgia in 1460.
Date	August, 1463
Location	near the fortress Chikhori, Argveti
Result	Bagrat's victory

Belligerents
Kingdom of Imereti; Principality of Mingrelia; Principality of Guria; Principality of Abkhazia; Principality of Svaneti	Kingdom of Georgia

Commanders and leaders
Prince Bagrat	George VIII

The Battle of Chikhori was fought in 1463 between the forces of King George VIII of Georgia and those of the rebel prince Bagrat, claimant to the throne of western Georgia. The battle ended in a decisive victory for Bagrat and his allies among the western Georgian nobility, leading to George VIII’s retreat to eastern Georgia and the effective loss of royal authority in Imereti. Following his victory, Bagrat captured Kutaisi and was crowned king of Imereti, formally establishing a separate western Georgian monarchy. The battle marked a turning point in Georgian history and is generally regarded as the beginning of the irreversible fragmentation and decline of the unified Kingdom of Georgia.

== History ==
The unity of the Georgian state collapsed after the failure of King George VIII’s diplomatic mission. Qvarqvare II Jaqeli formally remained a vassal and ally of the king, but he began encouraging Duke Bagrat of Samokalako to rebel against George VIII. Bagrat was the heir of the Bagrationi dynasty of Western Georgia, the oldest branch of the royal house. Its last sovereign, Constantine II of Imereti, had been deposed by George VII in 1401, and Bagrat now began to claim the throne of his ancestors. Constantine II had been George VIII’s uncle, and for this reason the nobility of Imereti did not initially suspect Bagrat of separatist intentions, although he was soon supported by the most powerful nobles of Western Georgia.

In addition to Samtskhe-Saatabago, Bagrat allied himself with Liparit I Dadiani, Mamia Gurieli, and the princes of Abkhazia and Svaneti, to whom he promised liberation from all central impositions. Together, the rebels captured numerous fortresses in Imereti in 1462, prompting George VIII to abolish the Duchy of Samokalako and to prepare for direct intervention. In 1463, the king crossed the Likhi Range and requested military assistance from Samtshe, whose loyalty he believed secure. Qvarqvare II entered Imereti with his troops but camped far from the main theater of operations, waiting to see who would prevail. This conduct was widely interpreted as direct support for the separatists.

George VIII and Bagrat confronted each other at Chikhori, where the rebels inflicted a decisive defeat on the forces of the central government. The king withdrew to Kartli, where he severely punished those nobles whom he considered insufficiently loyal. Bagrat captured Kutaisi, the largest city in western Georgia, and was crowned King of Imereti as Bagrat II in the presence of the high nobility of Mingrelia, Guria, Abkhazia, Samtshe, and Svaneti. His authority, however, remained weak, even within his own capital. The Battle of Chikhori marked the beginning of the decline of the Kingdom of Georgia: thereafter, Georgian kings never again exercised control over the entirety of the country.

Bagrat rewarded his allies by creating a principality for each of them:

- the Principality of Svaneti for the House of Gelovani;
- the Principality of Abkhazia for the House of Sharvashidze;
- the Principality of Mingrelia for the House of Dadiani;
- the Principality of Guria for the House of Gurieli.

== Bibliography ==
- Asatiani, Nodar (2008). Საქართველოს ისტორია II [History of Georgia, Volume 2] (in Georgian). Tbilisi: Tbilisi University Press. ISBN 978-9941-13-004-5.
- Asatiani, Nodar; Janelidze, Otar (2009). History of Georgia. Tbilisi: Publishing House Petite. ISBN 978-9941-9063-6-7.
- Brosset, Marie-Félicité (1849). Histoire de la Géorgie depuis l'Antiquité jusqu'au XIXe siècle. Volume I [History of Georgia from Ancient Times to the 19th Century, Volume 1] (in French). Saint-Petersburg: Imperial Academy of Sciences.
- Brosset, Marie-Félicité (1858). Histoire moderne de la Géorgie. Saint-Pétersbourg: Imprimerie de l'Académie impériale des sciences.
- Rayfield, Donald (2012). Edge of Empires, a History of Georgia. London: Reaktion Books. ISBN 978-1-78023-070-2.
- Salia, Kalistrat (1980). Histoire de la nation géorgienne [History of the Georgian nation] (in French). Paris: Nino Salia.
- Suny, Ronald Grigor (1994). The Making of the Georgian Nation (2nd ed.). Indiana University Press. ISBN 0-253-20915-3.
- Toumanoff, Cyril (1949–1951). "The Fifteenth-Century Bagratids and the Institution of Collegial Sovereignty in Georgia". Traditio. 7. Cambridge University Press: 169–221. JSTOR 27830207.
