= Alexander II of Imereti =

King of Imereti (r. 1484–1510)

Alexander II ალექსანდრე II
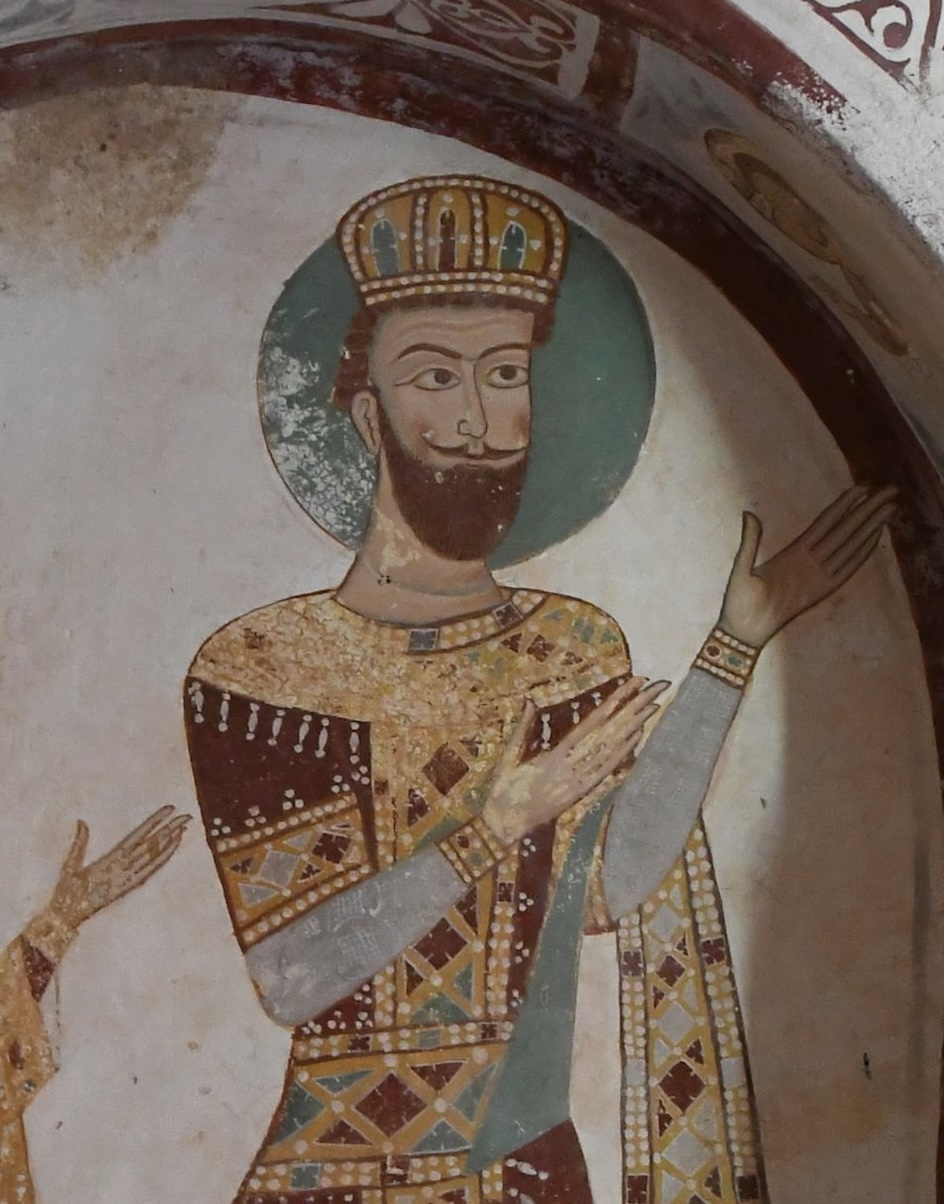
- Alexander II, a fresco from the Gelati Monastery

King of Imereti
- Reign: 1484–1510
- Predecessor: Bagrat II
- Successor: Bagrat III
- Died: 1 April 1510; Kutaisi
- Burial: Gelati Monastery
- Spouse: Tamar (died 1510)
- Issue Among others: Bagrat III of Imereti; Prince Vakhtang
- Dynasty: Bagrationi
- Father: Bagrat VI
- Mother: Helen
- Religion: Georgian Orthodox Church (Catholicate of Abkhazia)
- Khelrtva

Alexander II (Georgian: ალექსანდრე II, romanized: aleksandre II; died April 1, 1510), of the Bagrationi dynasty, was the king (mepe) of Imereti from 1484 to 1510.

The son of Bagrat VI, Alexander briefly succeeded his father in 1478 during the Georgian civil war of 1463–1490, a dynastic civil conflict that fragmented the Kingdom of Georgia into several independent realms. Deposed by his uncle and rival, Constantine II, Alexander fled to the mountains of northern western Georgia, from where he continued the civil war for several years. In 1484, amid the national turmoil that prevented Constantine from securing his territories, Alexander returned to power and was crowned King of Imereti. His reign, however, remained unstable, as he faced two further invasions by Constantine in 1485 and 1487, before finally consolidating his rule in 1489.

The official division of Georgia in 1490 recognized Alexander II as one of the four independent Georgian monarchs and established him as the founder of the Kingdom of Imereti, which endured until 1810. His reign was marked by efforts to strengthen internal governance and maintain unity against the growing autonomy of Mingrelia and Guria. In 1509, Alexander launched an unsuccessful campaign to reclaim central Georgia. That same year, Imereti faced its first encounter with the Ottoman Empire, marking the beginning of centuries of geopolitical conflict in the region.

Upon his death in 1510, Alexander II was succeeded by his son, Bagrat III of Imereti.

== Biography ==
=== Early life ===
Alexander was the third son of Bagrat VI and his wife, a certain Helen. His father, Bagrat, had been king of Imereti since 1463 under the name Bagrat II. In 1466, Bagrat moved to Kartli and declared himself King of Georgia under the name Bagrat VI. He soon entered into conflict with Prince Constantine, another claimant to the Georgian crown. In 1468, the two rivals reached a temporary peace agreement: Bagrat VI would retain the title of King of Georgia, with agreeing that upon his death, the realm would be divided—Constantine inheriting Kartli, and Alexander receiving Imereti.

=== Brief reign ===
Bagrat VI died in 1478, and despite his prior agreement with Constantine, Alexander sought to seize control over both Kartli and Imereti. (Note: Eastern Georgia was controlled by King Alexander I of Kakheti.) At the time, Constantine already ruled Kvemo Kartli and Georgian Armenia, and soon advanced toward Tbilisi, the capital. In response, Alexander attempted to have himself crowned at Kutaisi in Imereti by the Catholicos of Abkhazia. The coronation, however, failed when the leading dukes—Vameq II of Mingrelia, Kakhaber II of Guria, and the nobles of Abkhazia and Svaneti—boycotted the ceremony, depriving Alexander of the legitimacy he sought.

Although the royal army initially remained loyal to Alexander, Constantine II swiftly captured Tbilisi with the aid of mountain militias from Khevsureti and Tusheti, leaving Alexander without his capital. His forces were soon driven out of Kartli, and a number of fortresses across central Georgia fell to Constantine’s troops. The new ruler replaced the minor nobles installed by Bagrat VI and Alexander II with governors loyal to his cause.

By 1479, Gori had also been taken by Constantine, forcing Alexander to retreat once more to Kutaisi. Meanwhile, Vameq II of Mingrelia, seeking to avenge himself for the autocratic rule of Bagrat VI, allied with Constantine and helped in the invasion of Imereti. The collapse of the royal army was compounded by the betrayal of the Imeretian nobility, who swore allegiance to Constantine that same year.

Alexander fortified himself in a citadel, while Constantine's mountain troops and the Mingrelian troops of Vameq II captured Kutaisi together. In Kutaisi, Constantine II received the allegiance of the dukes of Mingrelia and Guria, garrisoned the city to protect it against a potential attack by Alexander, and set off to fight against Samtskhe, another rebellious Georgian province.

=== Guerrilla warfare ===
Following his defeat in 1479, Alexander withdrew into the mountainous regions of Racha and Lechkhumi, where he forged an alliance with the local population and continued to assert his claim to his father’s throne. The genealogist Cyril Toumanoff notes that Alexander remained firmly convinced of his hereditary right to the Georgian crown as the senior descendant of David VI (r. 1245–1293). The 16th-century Ottoman historian İbrahim Peçevi likewise recognized the legitimacy of Alexander’s dynastic claim.

Modern historian Donald Rayfield, however, suggests that Constantine II may have appointed Alexander as Duke of Racha and Lechkhumi in 1479, granting him residence at the royal court of Kutaisi.

Regardless of his exact status, Alexander governed both provinces and led a prolonged resistance against the central authority. In 1483, he married a woman named Tamar, and it is possible that he used the occasion to have himself crowned as anti-king with the support of the local nobility. That same year, Constantine II suffered a decisive defeat against the forces of Samtskhe and was forced to retreat toward Tbilisi.

In 1484, the death of Vameq II of Mingrelia, who had been consolidating Constantine’s control over Imereti, created a power vacuum. Seeing an opportunity, Alexander launched a new military campaign to reclaim his authority over western Georgia.

== King of Imereti ==
=== Restoration and consolidation of power ===
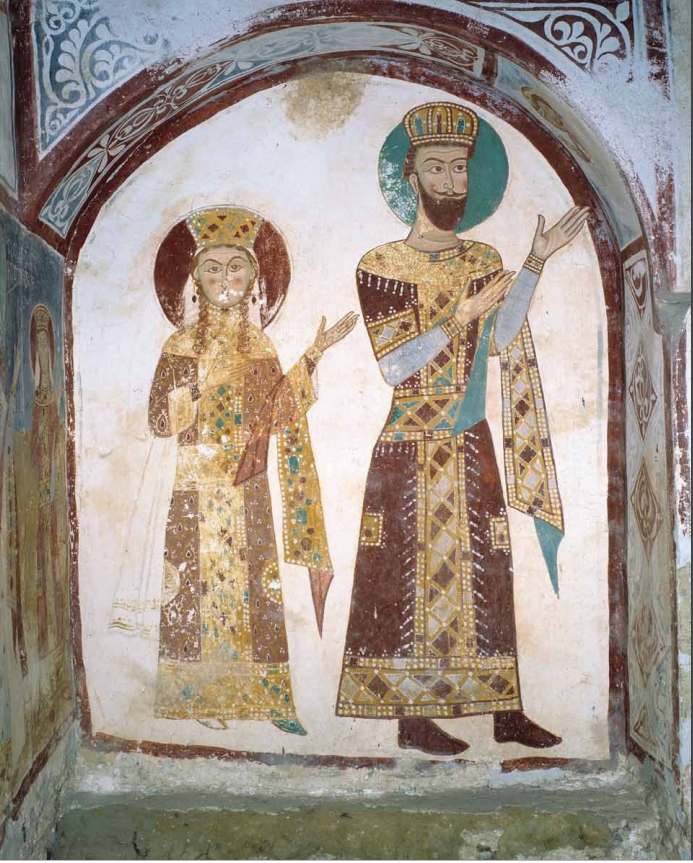
Alexander II and Queen Tamar, fresco at the Gelati Monastery

With the support of his mountain forces, Alexander recaptured the weakened and largely abandoned city of Kutaisi in 1484, where he was crowned Alexander II, King of Likht-Imereti (meaning “the nation on this side of the Likhi,” referring to the Likhi Range that divides western Georgia from Kartli). His coronation marked a formal declaration of independence from the rest of the Georgian kingdom. (Note: While numerous pretenders to the throne fought each other throughout the 15th century, Alexander II was the first ruler of western Georgia to claim not the kingdom of Georgia, but Imereti.)

Following his enthronement, Alexander launched campaigns across western Georgia, though he failed to bring Mingrelia and Guria fully under his control, while Constantine II remained preoccupied with warfare in Samtskhe. Seeking to reunify Georgia, Constantine invaded Imereti in 1485, but was decisively defeated by Alexander and a nobleman from the Lortkipanidze family in a battle at Chikhori. The following year, Constantine was forced to retreat to Kartli when Sultan Yaqub Aq Qoyunlu began a series of military incursions into his eastern territories.

Meanwhile, Liparit II Dadiani, Duke of Mingrelia, continued to oppose Alexander. In 1487, he invited Constantine II to renew his invasion of Imereti. The allied Kartlian and Mingrelian forces, supported by factions of the Imeretian nobility, overran Alexander’s domains. Once again, Alexander was forced to abandon his capital and take refuge in a fortified citadel. When Constantine’s mountain militias laid siege to him, Alexander fled north into the mountains, allowing Constantine and Liparit to seize the fortresses loyal to Alexander.

Constantine consolidated his control by employing North Caucasian tribes to enforce his rule and remained in Kutaisi, fearing another Imeretian uprising. Thus, when Yaqub invaded Kartli again in 1488, Constantine refused to leave Imereti and instead sent two of his generals to confront the invaders. However, Yaqub successfully besieged Tbilisi, forcing Constantine to abandon Imereti. This withdrawal allowed Alexander to reclaim his throne and restore his authority.

Taking advantage of the crisis in eastern Georgia, Alexander II reconciled with the Imeretian nobility and Liparit of Mingrelia. In 1489, a coalition of mountain forces from Racha, Lechkhumi, and Svaneti invaded Imereti, capturing numerous strategic fortresses before Constantine could respond. Kutaisi soon fell, marking the final separation of Imereti from the Georgian crown—a division that would endure until the Russian annexation in the 19th century.

In 1490, with Tbilisi liberated, Constantine II convened a royal council to determine a plan for the reconquest of Kakheti, Imereti, and Samtskhe. However, the high Georgian nobility, wary of Constantine’s growing power, resolved instead to officially dissolve the unified Kingdom of Georgia, founded in 1008. A series of peace treaties followed between Constantine and the various regional rulers. In Imereti, Tbilisi formally recognized Alexander II's territorial boundaries, while Alexander in turn was compelled to grant broad autonomy to Guria and Mingrelia, with Abkhazia incorporated into Mingrelia.

This arrangement created a decentralized and fragile western Georgia, yet one that, in theory, left open the possibility of future reunification. A final treaty between Constantine and Alexander was concluded in 1491 (or 1493, according to some sources), one year after the royal council’s decision, officially confirming Imereti’s independence under Alexander II.

=== Formation of a New Kingdom ===
Royal charter of King Alexander II

After securing independence, Alexander II was faced with an unstable realm and a powerful nobility that continuously threatened his authority. During his early years on the throne, he focused on consolidating his power by waging campaigns against rebellious lords. Several were executed, while others were stripped of their lands and noble titles or replaced with other nobles loyal to the Crown.

Alexander’s greatest challenge, however, came from the influential princes who ruled the regions along the Black Sea — Liparit of Mingrelia and George of Guria. Peace with these powerful vassals was achieved only after an agreement that came to define the subsequent history of the Kingdom of Imereti:

- The Crown would no longer interfere in the internal affairs of the two principalities;
- The princes of Mingrelia and Guria were released from their obligation to pay taxes to Imereti;
- The rulers of Mingrelia were henceforth granted the hereditary office of Mandaturtukhutsesi (Minister of the Interior);
- The rulers of Guria were designated Amirspasalar (Commander of the Royal Army);
- Mingrelia and Guria were required to provide soldiers for the royal army;
- Their lands remained open for royal hunting;
- The king retained the de jure right to confirm the succession of each princely ruler.

Alexander II also sought to extend his authority into Abkhazia by subduing Prince Solomon Sharvashidze and the ducal family of Gelovani in Svaneti. Contemporary records indicate that Alexander soon became involved in Svaneti’s internal affairs, supporting the Japaridze-Kuchaidze clan in a political dispute over control of the mountainous province.

Following the example of his counterparts in Kartli and Kakheti, Alexander initiated a military reform that divided the armed forces into four sadrosho (district commands), each led by the king and the hereditary lords of Argveti, Racha, and Lechkhumi. However, unlike the reform in Kakheti—which strengthened royal authority—Alexander’s changes allowed the nobility to expand its influence, further fragmenting the small kingdom.

In 1495, Queen Tamar gave birth to Prince Bagrat, the heir of Alexander II. (Note: Without an heir, the throne would have returned to the control of Constantine II, Alexander's uncle.) That same year, Alexander concluded a new peace agreement with Constantine of Kartli, securing the latter’s support against rebellious petty nobles in Imereti.

=== Invasion of Kartli ===
The lack of unity among the four Georgian monarchs (Note: The kings of Kartli, Kakheti and Imereti, and the atabeg of Samtskhe.) became evident once again in 1500, when Constantine II, Alexander I of Kakheti, and Kaikhosro I Jaqeli of Samtskhe formed an anti-Ottoman coalition in alliance with Safavid Iran—a coalition in which Alexander II did not participate.

In 1505, Constantine II, Alexander’s long-standing adversary, died and was succeeded by his son David X. Seeing an opportunity to restore the unity of Georgia under his rule, Alexander II launched an ambitious campaign. In 1509, he crossed the Likhi Range with a large army and captured the strategic town of Gori.

Confronted with this invasion, David X refused to engage in warfare against fellow Georgians. He became known for his measured response to his royal council’s call for military action, declaring: “He who loves trouble will meet trouble.” Alexander II continued his advance and soon annexed the entire northwestern region of Kartli.

=== Ottoman Invasion ===
Along the borders of Imereti, the Ottoman Empire was steadily rising in power. Despite an earlier military incursion in 1461—intended to deter the Georgians from aiding Trebizond—the Turks largely ignored western Georgia throughout the latter half of the 15th century. This policy shifted under the reign of Sultan Bayezid II (r. 1481–1512), who focused on his eastern frontiers to counter the growing influence of Safavid Iran.

By the early 1500s, an Ottoman army invaded Samtskhe and Guria, temporarily seizing the provinces of Adjara and Chaneti. At the same time, the Ottomans used their dominance over the Black Sea to extend influence into Abkhazia, incorporating the Jiks tribe into their political sphere.

In 1509, taking advantage of Alexander II's absence while he campaigned in Kartli, the Ottomans launched an invasion of Imereti. Selim, the Ottoman governor of Trebizond and son of the sultan, led the assault on 23 November 1509 at the head of an army composed of North Caucasian forces settled in Anatolia. The invaders ravaged the kingdom, captured Kutaisi, and burned both the capital and the Gelati Monastery, the religious center of western Georgia.

Upon learning of the invasion, Alexander abandoned his campaign in Gori, allowing David X of Kartli to reclaim territories seized by the Imeretians. However, Alexander was unable to liberate the captives taken as slaves by the Ottomans. The invasion was later recorded in detail by the 16th-century Ottoman historian İbrahim Peçevi.

In March 1510, Queen Tamar died, while Alexander was preparing plans for a retaliatory campaign into Anatolia. According to the Georgian Chronicles, he soon fell ill with “a disease as painful as it was cruel” and died on 1 April 1510. He was buried alongside his wife at the Gelati Monastery. His minor son, Bagrat III, succeeded him on the throne.

== Family ==
Alexander was married to a certain Tamar (died 12 March 1510). His children were:

- Bagrat III of Imereti (1495–1565), King of Imereti (r. 1510–1565);
- Prince Vakhtang (fl. 1512–1548);
- Prince George (fl. 1511–1545), who was married to a certain Ana (fl. 1565–1578);
- Prince David (fl. 1510–1524);
- Prince Demetrius (fl. 1511);
- Princess Tinatin, who married Spiridon Beenashvili;
- An unnamed daughter, who was married twice, secondly to George, son of Rostom Gurieli.

== Legacy ==
Alexander II continued the religious policies of his father, maintaining the ecclesiastical independence of western Georgia through the establishment of the Catholicate of Abkhazia. In 1490, he appointed Stephan as catholicos. Contemporary royal documents record numerous gifts made by the king to the Church, including a residence granted to the Gelati Monastery in 1495 and a peasant family donated to the Khakhuli Church of Gelati in 1505.

In 1492, approximately 200,000 Spanish Jews were expelled during the Spanish Inquisition and sought refuge across the Ottoman Empire. A number of these Jewish refugees settled in western Georgia, forming a Jewish community under Alexander II’s reign. This act of hospitality by a Christian monarch—at a time when much of Europe was persecuting Jews—has often been cited as a symbol of Georgian tolerance. President Salomé Zourabichvili has invoked this example in her campaign to have Georgia’s historic tradition of tolerance recognized as an element of UNESCO’s cultural heritage.

An inscription on the Monastery of the Cross in Imereti refers to Alexander as “King of Kings of Likht-Imer and Likht-Amier,” making him the first monarch to adopt this title. His successors retained it until the Russian annexation of Imereti in 1810. Alexander II was the progenitor of the Bagrationi dynasty of Imereti, which produced twenty rulers and continues to this day as a noble family.

== Bibliography ==
- Allen, W.E.D. (1932). A History of the Georgian People. London: Routledge & Keagan Paul.
- Asatiani, Nodar (2008). Საქართველოს ისტორია II [History of Georgia, Volume 2] (in Georgian). Tbilisi: Tbilisi University Press. ISBN 978-9941-13-004-5.
- Asatiani, Nodar; Janelidze, Otar (2009). History of Georgia. Tbilisi: Publishing House Petite. ISBN 978-9941-9063-6-7.
- Berdzenishvili, Nikoloz (1973). Საქართველოს ისტორიის საკითხები [Issues of Georgian history] (in Georgian). Vol. 6. Tbilisi: Metsniereba.
- Berdzenishvili, D. (1975). Georgian Soviet Encyclopedia. Vol. I. Tbilisi.
- Brosset, Marie-Félicité (1851). Voyage archéologique en Transcaucasie. Saint-Pétersbourg: Imprimerie de l'Académie impériale des Sciences.
- Brosset, Marie-Félicité (1858). Histoire moderne de la Géorgie. Saint-Pétersbourg: Imprimerie de l'Académie impériale des sciences.
- Salia, Kalistrat (1980). Histoire de la nation géorgienne. Paris: Édition Nino Salia.
- Metreveli, Roin (2000). საქართველოს კათოლიკოს–პატრიარქები [Catholicos-Patriarchs of Georgia] (in Georgian). Tbilisi: Nekeri.
- Mikaberidze, Alexander (2015). Historical Dictionary of Georgia (2 ed.). Rowman & Littlefield. ISBN 978-1442241466.
- Rayfield, Donald (2012). Edge of Empires, a History of Georgia. London: Reaktion Books. ISBN 978-1-78023-070-2.
- Toumanoff, Cyril (1949–1951). The Fifteenth-Century Bagratids and the Institution of Collegial Sovereignty in Georgia.
- Brosset, Marie‑Félicité (1856). Histoire de la Géorgie depuis l’antiquité jusqu’au XIXe siècle (in French). Saint‑Pétersbourg: Imprimerie de l’Académie impériale des sciences.

Lortkipanidze, Mariam; Metreveli, Roin (2007). საქართველოს მეფეები (in Georgian). Tbilisi: ნეკერი. ISBN 99928-58-36-2.

Preceded by Bagrat VI	King of Imereti; 1484–1510	Succeeded by Bagrat III
