= Melchizedek (disambiguation) =

Melchizedek is a Biblical figure of significance in both Judaic and Christian traditions.

Melchizedek may also refer to:

== Religion ==
- Priesthood of Melchizedek, the continuum of Malkizedek's priesthood in various religions
- Exaltation of Melchizedek, for the references in Second Book of Enoch
- Melchisedechians, for an early Christian heresy
- Melchizedek priesthood (Latter Day Saints), for LDS significance
- Melchizedek (text), a Gnostic text

== People ==
- Melchizedek I of Georgia (fl. 1010–1033), the first Catholicos-Patriarch of All Georgia
- Melchizedek II of Georgia (fl. 1528–1553)
- Melchizedek III of Georgia (1872–1960)
- Melchisedec Ștefănescu (1823, 1892), Romanian bishop and historian
- Melchisédech Thévenot (ca. 1620-1692), French author, scientist, traveler, cartographer, orientalist, inventor, and diplomat
- Melquisedec Angulo Córdova (fl. 2009), member of the Mexican Navy's special forces
- Melky Sedeck, R&B hip hop duo

== Fictional characters ==
- Melchizedek, a rich Jew in Boccaccio's The Decameron, Day 1, Novel 3
- Melchizedek, a character in The Alchemist by Paulo Coelho
- Melchizedek, the main brain of Salem in the Battle Angel Alita graphic novel series

== Other uses ==
- Melchizedek, a 30-litre wine bottle, often used for champagne
- The Dominion of Melchizedek, a micronation known largely for allegedly facilitating large scale banking fraud
