= Aradeti Fortress =

Fortification complex

Aradeti fortress
- ავრანლოს ციხე
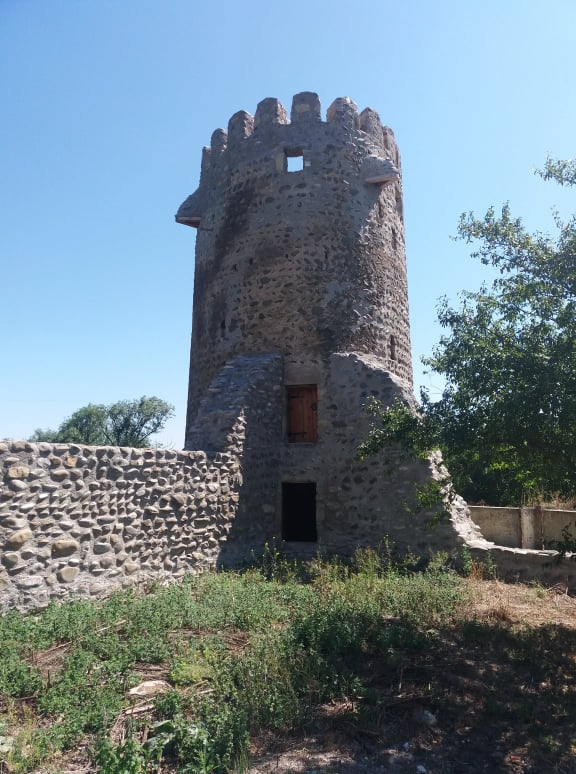
- Aradeti fortress
- Interactive map of Aradeti fortress
- Location: Kareli Municipality, Shida Kartli, Georgia
- Coordinates: 42°03′47″N 43°52′54″E
- Type: Cyclopean fortress
- Restored date: 2020

Aradeti Fortress is a fortification complex of the 17-18th century Georgia in the village of Aradeti, Kareli Municipality, Shida Kartli region. Situated on the right bank of Prone River, the complex contains the fortress itself and a small church.

The hall church was firstly built in 1666 by Queen Mariam, which is written on the wall. The fortress was presumably constructed around the church in the 18th century, when Georgia suffered from lezgins attacks. It was significantly destroyed and remained in ruins, before it was restored in 2020.

Quadrangular in shape it has rounded four and five floor towers, will arrowslits and machicolations.
