= John Stone's Chronicle =

Entry on the patriarch of Antioch

John Stone's Chronicle is a Latin chronicle covering the years 1415–1471/2. It is preserved in a single manuscript, MS 417, in the library of Corpus Christi College, Cambridge.

The Chronicle was begun in 1467 by John Stone, a Benedictine monk of Christ's Church, Canterbury. He was probably a native of Stone in Oxney. John was an eyewitness to many of the later events in the chronicle and many others are based on eyewitness reports. He died in 1481.

The Chronicle contains much information on Christ's Church and is local in focus, but it does occasionally come to bear on wider events. Stone describes the entry of Jack Cade into London during the rebellion of 1450, and the ensuing execution of James Fiennes on Cheapside:

On the third day of July following [1450], the aforesaid captain [Cade] entered the city of London and accepted the keys to the gates of the city. The following day, Sir James Fiennes, Lord Saye, knight, and [...] Crowmer, sheriff of Kent, and the clerk of the said sheriff, and another, were beheaded in a street called Cheap.

For 1466, he describes a visit of the diplomat Ludovico da Bologna, Patriarch of Antioch, trying to drum up support for an anti-Ottoman alliance:

In the year of the Lord 1466, on the twelfth day of the month of December, namely, on the vigil of St Lucy the Virgin, there came to Canterbury [...] the Lord Patriarch of Antioch, who, in honor of the king and queen, had here four dromedaries and two camels. And this had never before been seen in England.

== Editions ==
- W. G. Searle, ed. Christ Church, Canterbury: I. The Chronicle of John Stone, Monk of Christ Church, 1415–1471. Cambridge, 1902.
- Meriel Connor, ed. John Stone's Chronicle: Christ Church Priory, Canterbury, 1417–1472. Medieval Institute Publications, 2010.
