= Bediani (title) =

Medieval title

Bediani (Georgian: ბედიანი) was a medieval title, or a territorial epithet, of the Dadiani, the ruling family of Mingrelia in western Georgia, derived from the canton of Bedia, in Abkhazia, and in use from the end of the 12th century into the 15th. Bediani was occasionally used as a praenomen. The extent of the fief of Bedia is difficult to define; by the latter half of the 17th century, the Shervashidze of Abkhazia had supplanted the Dadiani in that area.

The title of Bediani should not be confused with that of Bedieli, which, although derived from the same toponym, was the one used by the bishops seated at the Bedia Cathedral.

== Primary sources ==
Bediani appears in the Georgian—both narrative and epigraphic—and Western European sources from the early 13th century to the latter half of the 15th century, first in the Histories and Eulogies of the Sovereigns, a part of the Georgian Chronicles, in the list of the Georgian "dukes" (eristavi) under Queen Tamar (r. 1184–1213). In the 15th century, Bediani (Bedias, Bendian) was used as a designation of the Prince of Mingrelia (e.g., Bendian rex Mingreliae) by the Italian visitors to the Caucasus—Ludovico da Bologna in 1460 and Giosafat Barbaro and Ambrogio Contarini in the early 1470s. Barbaro, further, reported that Bendiani of Mingrelia possessed, inter alia, two fortified cities on the Black Sea, called Vathi and Sauastopoli, the former identified with Batumi, then in Guria, and the latter being Sukhumi, now in Abkhazia.

== Sabediano ==
Early in the 20th century, the Georgian historian Ivane Javakhishvili introduced the term "Sabediano", based on a standard Georgian geographic circumfix sa⟩ ⟨o, to refer to a polity—semi-independent of the kings of Georgia—which had come into being, by the 1470s, to bring together Mingrelia (Odishi proper), Abkhazia, and Guria under the aegis of the Dadiani princes with the style of Bediani. This view and the associated neologism were accepted by several Soviet-era scholars, including Zurab Anchabadze, who, however, dated the emergence of the principality of Sabediano back to the end of the 14th century, when the Mingrelian princes were reported by the Georgian sources to have had dispossessed their Abkhazian counterparts of their holdings up to and including Anacopia. The suggested boundaries of the principality, at its largest extent, were from the Chorokhi river to the Greater Caucasus crest and from the Tskhenistsqali to the Black Sea.

Other historians, such as Cyril Toumanoff and Tamaz Beradze, dismissed the possibility of existence of the Dadiani-ruled unified polity such as Sabediano, with Abkhazia and Guria as its parts. According to Toumanoff, "Guria was a fief of the secundogeniture of the Dadianis, separate from Mingrelia, as early as 1352."
