= Aradeti =

Aradeti არადეთი
- Location in Georgia
- Coordinates: 42°3′47″N 43°52′54″E
- Country: Georgia
- Region: Shida Kartli
- Municipality: Kareli
- Elevation: 660 m (2,170 ft)

Population (2014)
  - Total: 432
- Time zone: UTC+4 (Georgian Time)

Aradeti is a small village in Kareli Municipality, Shida Kartli region of the Republic of Georgia. Situated on the banks of Prone River, the place is known for the 15th century Battle of Aradeti and the 17th century Aradeti Fortress
