= Tamar of Imereti =

Tamar of Imereti may refer to:

- Tamar (died 1510), Queen consort of Imereti, as the wife of King Alexander II of Imereti
- Tamar of Imereti, queen consort of Georgia, as the second wife of Alexander I of Georgia
- Tamar of Imereti (died 1556), wife of King Luarsab I of Kartli
