= Mamia Gurieli =

Mamia Gurieli (Georgian: მამია გურიელი, fl. 1460) was a member of the House of Dadiani and eristavi ("duke") of Guria in western Georgia in the latter half of the 15th century. He was the first ruler of Guria styled as Gurieli, after whom the Dukes and then, Princes of Guria formed one continuous dynasty down to the Russian annexation of 1829.

== Biography ==
Mamia was a younger son of Liparit I Dadiani , Duke (Eristavi) of Odishi (Mingrelia), and brother to Liparit's successor Shamadavle Dadiani. He is first mentioned in a charter of King George VIII dated to 1460. Mamia was in possession of Guria, which had been a fief of the secundogeniture of the Dadiani since around 1352. By the 1450s, Georgia was embroiled in a series of internecine conflicts which ultimately led to the division of the Kingdom of Georgia. The civil war subsided, but only briefly, by 1460, when the Italian envoy Ludovico da Bologna attempted an intercession between the Georgian dynasts to enable their participation in the proposed crusade of Pope Pius II against the Ottoman menace. Among the Eastern Christian princes ready to take up arms, the contemporary Western European documents mention Mamia as a marquis of Guria: "Mania, marchio Goriae".

Mamia may have been the Georgian ruler who defeated the Burgundians at Batumi and imprisoned their leader, Geoffroy de Thoisy, in 1445. Thoisy was only released through the good services of the Emperor John IV of Trebizond. The Gurieli, whose lordship lay between the Trapezuntine theme of Lazia and Mingrelia, had close ties with the Komnenoi. David Komnenos sent his wife, Helena, to Mamia for safety just before the Ottoman military advanced to Trebizond in 1461. The chronicle by Laonikos Chalkokondyles suggests that Mamia may have been related by marriage in some otherwise unrecorded way to the Trapezuntine Komnenoi. According to the historian Cyril Toumanoff, this means that Mamia was married to a daughter of David of Trebizond. This is supported by the Masarelli Vatican manuscript, which records that David and his wife had two (unnamed) daughters, one of whom married the Seigneur de Mammia and the other a Turkish Pasha.

Mamia Gurieli House of Gurieli
Regnal titles
Unknown	Duke of Guria c. 1450–1469	Succeeded by Kakhaber II Gurieli
