= Melchizedek II of Georgia =

Melchizedek II (Georgian: მელქისედეკ I, romanized: melkisedek' I; died c. 1553) was the Catholicos Patriarch of Georgia in the years of c. 1538–1541 or in the periods of 1528-1529, 1540-1545, and 1548-1552. He was a son of King Constantine II of Kartli by his wife Tamar.

== Ancestry ==
Ancestors of Melchizedek II of Georgia

16. Constantine I of Georgia
8. Alexander I of Georgia
17. Natia N.
4. Demetrius
18. Beshken II Orbelian
9. Dulandukht Orbelian
2. Constantine II of Georgia
5. Gulashar N.
1. Melchizedek
3. Tamar N.

Eastern Orthodox Church titles
Preceded by Malachias	Catholicos-Patriarch of All Georgia; 1538–1541	Succeeded by Germanus
