= Constantine II of Georgia =

King of Georgia from 1478 to 1505

Constantine II

King of Georgia
- Reign: 1478–1490
- Predecessor: Bagrat VI
- Successor: Kingdom dissolved

King of Kartli
- Reign: 1490–1505
- Predecessor: Position established
- Successor: David X
- Born: 1447
- Died: 1505 (aged 57–58)
- Spouse: Tamar
- Issue Among others: David X; George IX of Kartli; Bagrat, Prince of Mukhrani; Catholicos-Patriarch Melchizedek II
- Dynasty: Bagrationi
- Father: Prince Demetrius of Georgia
- Mother: Gulashar
- Religion: Georgian Orthodox Church
- Khelrtva

Constantine II (Georgian: კონსტანტინე II, romanized: k'onst'ant'ine II; c. 1447 – 1505), of the Bagrationi dynasty, was the 23rd and last king (mepe) of United Georgia from 1478 until his death. Early in the 1490s, he had to recognise the independence of his rival rulers of Imereti and Kakheti, and to confine his power to Kartli. In 1505, Constantine II died, and was succeeded by his son David X.

== Life ==
Royal charter of King Constantine II.

Constantine II was the son of Prince Demetrius. In 1465, together with his uncle, the Georgian king George VIII, Constantine was taken prisoner by the rebel prince Qvarqvare II Jaqeli, atabeg of Samtskhe (principality in southern Georgia). He managed, however, to escape the captivity, and taking opportunity of the Imeretian king Bagrat VI’s absence at the campaign in Kartli, vainly attempted to seize control of the Imeretian capital Kutaisi. Despite the failure, he considered himself king and later won some power in Kartli. However, only with Bagrat’s death in 1478 was Constantine able to drive out Bagrat’s son, Alexander II, and become king of Georgia, though already fragmented and torn apart by the bitter civil wars. In 1483, he was defeated by Qvarqvare II of Samtskhe at the Battle of Aradeti. Alexander took advantage and established himself in Imereti but lost Kutaisi to Constantine again in 1484. In the winter of 1488, the Ak Koyunlu Turkomans led by Sufi Khalil Beg Mawsilu attacked Georgia’s capital Tbilisi, and took the city after a long-lasted siege in February 1489. Though the foreign occupation of the capital did not last long, the situation was immediately exploited by Alexander who seized control of Kutaisi and the rest of Imereti. From 1490 to 1493, Constantine was compelled to de jure recognise his cousin Alexander I of Kakheti and Alexander II of Imereti as independent sovereigns and to grant Qvarqvare II significant autonomy. Constantine himself was left with Kartli as the extent of his kingdom. Thus, by the end of the 15th century, Georgia was divided into three independent kingdoms (Kartli, Kakheti, and Imereti) and five autonomous principalities (Samtskhe, Mingrelia, Guria, Abkhazia, and Svaneti).

Between 1492–1496, Constantine attempted to win an international support to reunite the country and defend it against the increasingly aggressive Muslim empires of Ottoman Turkey and Safavid Iran. For this purpose, Georgian ambassadors were sent to the Burji sultan of Egypt Qaitbay, and also to Pope Alexander VI and Isabella I of Castile. The embassies, however, proved to be fruitless.

Upon the death of Qvargvare II's son Kaikhosro I, only two years after he ascended the throne of the Samtskhe principality, he was succeeded by his equally "pious" brother Mzechabuk. At the same time, the Iranian Safavids, led by the emerging king (shah) Ismail I were tempted to loot the feudal state, if only to distract himself from his main quarry; Shirvan. In the same year, in 1500, Ismail I baited Constantine as well as king Alexander II of Imereti to attack Ottoman possessions located nearby Tabriz. As a precaution, Ismail had Aleksander send his son Demetre to the newly conquered region of Shirvan, where the prince negotiated a peace agreement. Ismail promised Constantine, that once Tabriz was captured, he would cancel the tribute Constantine still paid to the Ak Koyunlu Turcomans. Each Georgian ruler contributed 3,000 men to the existing Ismail's own 7,000, and by 1503 they enabled him to recapture Nakhchivan from the Ottomans. However, Ismail I broke his promise, and made Kartli and Kakheti his vassals.

=== Death ===
Constantine II died in 1505, leaving the throne to his son, David X. As indicated by surviving church records, he might have abdicated the throne and retired to monastery under the name of Cyril in 1503 or 1504.

== Family ==
Constantine II was married to a certain Tamar (died 1492). He had the following children:

- David X (died 1526), King of Kartli (r. 1505–1525);
- George IX of Kartli (died 1539/1540), King of Kartli (r. 1525–1527/1534);
- Bagrat, Prince of Mukhrani (died 1540), Prince of Mukhrani (1512–1540) and founder of the House of Mukhrani:
- Prince Demetrius (fl. 1487–1526), co-king with his father along with his brothers:
- Prince Vakhtang (fl. 1526);
- Prince Alexander (fl. 1526–1556), ancestor of the Gochashvili family:
- Melchizedek II of Georgia (died 1553), Catholicos-Patriarch of All Georgia;
- Prince Targamos (fl. 1517–1525);
- Princess Gulshar, who married Prince Kakhaber Chijavadze;
- Princess Martha;
- Princess Astandar, who married a certain Manuchar.

== Sources ==
- Suny, Ronald Grigor (1994). The Making of the Georgian Nation. Indiana University Press. ISBN 978-0253209153.

Regnal titles
Preceded by Alexander II	King of Georgia (Kartli); 1478–1505	Succeeded by David X
