= Battle of Aradeti =

1483 battle in the Georgian Civil Wars

- Part of the Georgian Civil Wars
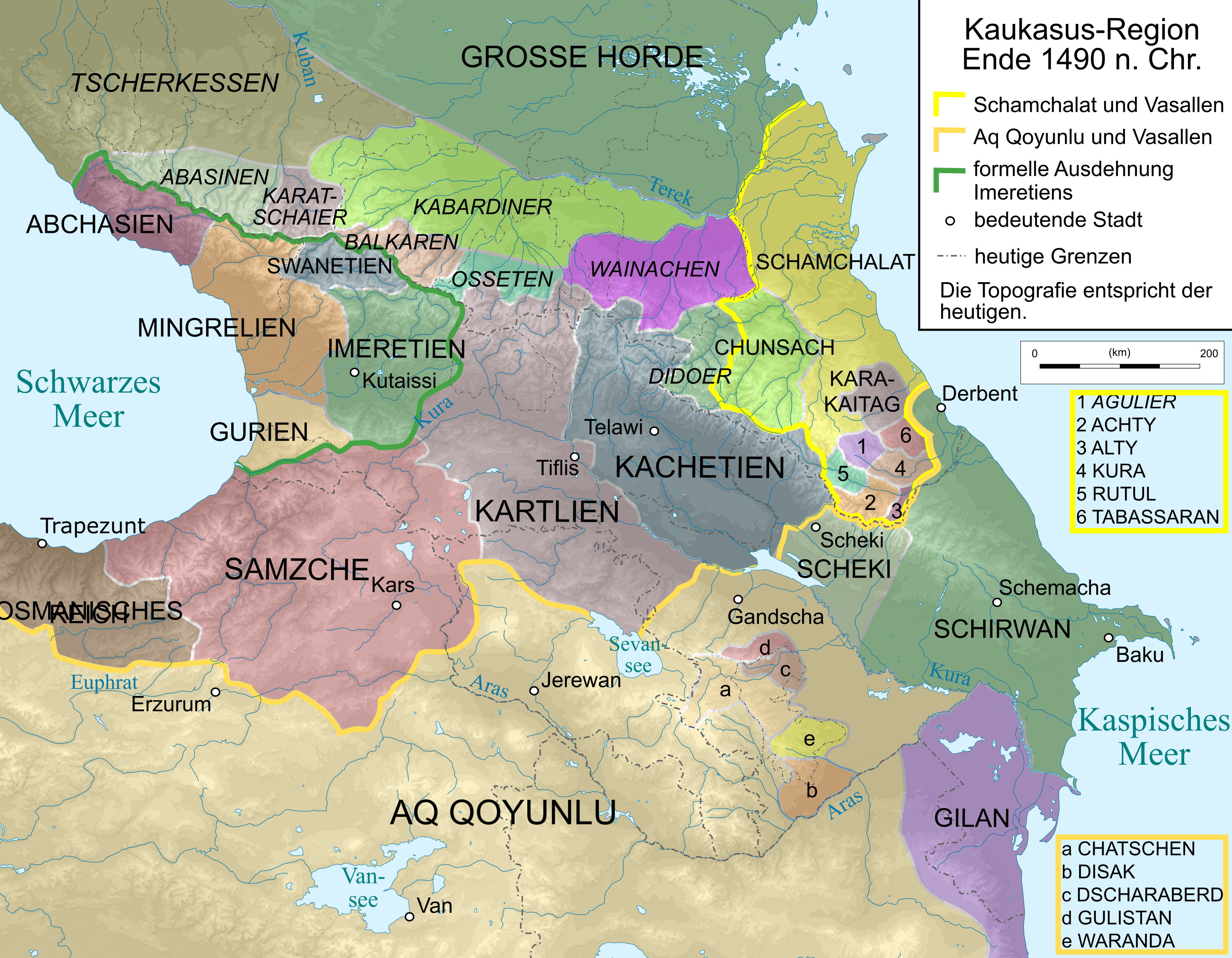
Date	August, 1483
Location	Aradeti
Result	Samtskhian victory

Belligerents
Principality of Samtskhe	Kingdom of Georgia

Commanders and leaders
Kvarkvare II	Giorgi VIII

The Battle of Aradeti (Georgian: არადეთის ბრძოლა) was fought between the armies of the Kingdom of Georgia and the Principality of Samtskhe at the place of Aradeti on August 1483.

The political split of the Kingdom of Georgia was speeded up by the Eristavs of Samtskhe. In 1483, Atabeg Kvarkvare II routed the royal troops at Aradeti. These events signaled the end of the united Kingdom of Georgia, which disintegrated into several principalities. Kvarkvare gained his long sought independence in Samtskhe while Eristav Bagrat seized the thrones of Imereti and Kartli and Giorgi VIII carved out his own realm in Kakheti.
