= Ambrogio Contarini =

Venetian nobleman and merchant (1429–1499)

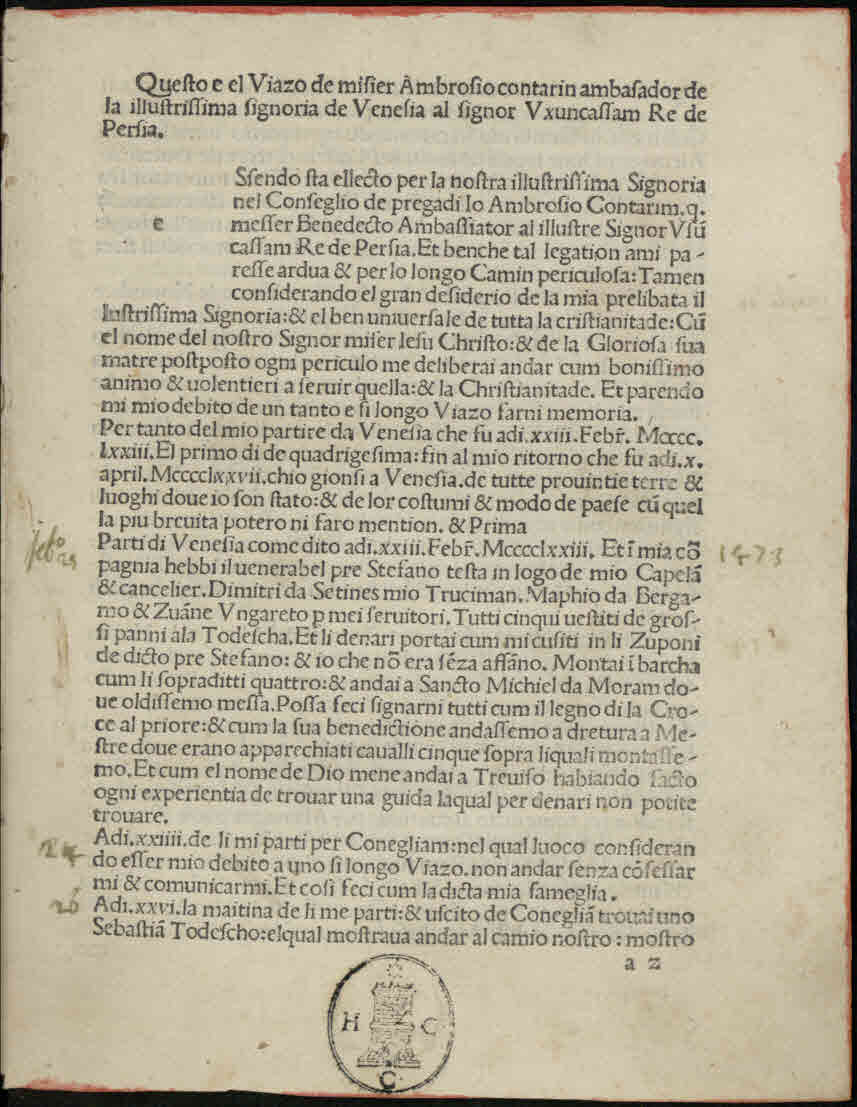
Viaggio al signor Usun Hassan re di Persia, 1487

Ambrogio Contarini (1429–1499) was a Venetian nobleman, merchant and diplomat known for an account of his travel to Iran, where he met Giosafat Barbaro.

== Life ==
Ambrogio Contarini was a member of the patrician family of Contarini and spent his youth in the Ottoman capital of Constantinople as a merchant. He left the city after the Ottoman–Venetian war began in 1463.

In 1470, he was aboard the Aegeus, fighting the Ottomans at sea. The Republic of Venice sought to forge a larger alliance against the Ottoman Empire and sent Contarini with a diplomatic mission to Uzun Hassan, the Iranian ruler of the Aq Qoyunlu clan. He left Venice in February 1474, traveled through Austria, Poland, and the Caucasus. He reached Tabriz in August 1474. In October, he met Uzun Hassan at his capital of Isfahan. He was kindly received, but the Venetian proposal of alliance was declined. There he met another diplomat, Giosafat Barbaro. Contarini returned to Venice only in April 1477, after many delays and a difficult return voyage.

On his journey home from Iran, Contarini stopped in Moscow, where he had an audience with the Russian tsar, Ivan III. He also stopped at Germany.

On the day of his arrival in Venice, Contarini orally reported to the Council of the Republic. His report was published in Venice in 1476 by H. Foxius as Questo e el Viazo de misier Ambrogio Contarini. A written account of his mission appeared in print in 1486 in Vicenza. Contarini's itinerary is dominated by his own personal vicissitudes, but contains much valuable information about the regions he visited, especially Iran under Uzun Hassan's rule.

== Works ==
- Contarini, Ambrogio (1487). Viaggio al signor Usun Hassan re di Persia (in Venetian). Annibale Fossi.

== See also ==
- List of foreign observers of Russia

== Sources ==
- "Контарини, Амвросий" . Brockhaus and Efron Encyclopedic Dictionary (in Russian). 1906.
- Lepschy, Laura (2002). "Contarini, Ambrogio". The Oxford Companion to Italian Literature. Oxford University Press. ISBN 978-0-19-818332-7.
