= Bagrat VI =

King of Georgia from 1466 to 1478

Bagrat VI ბაგრატ VI
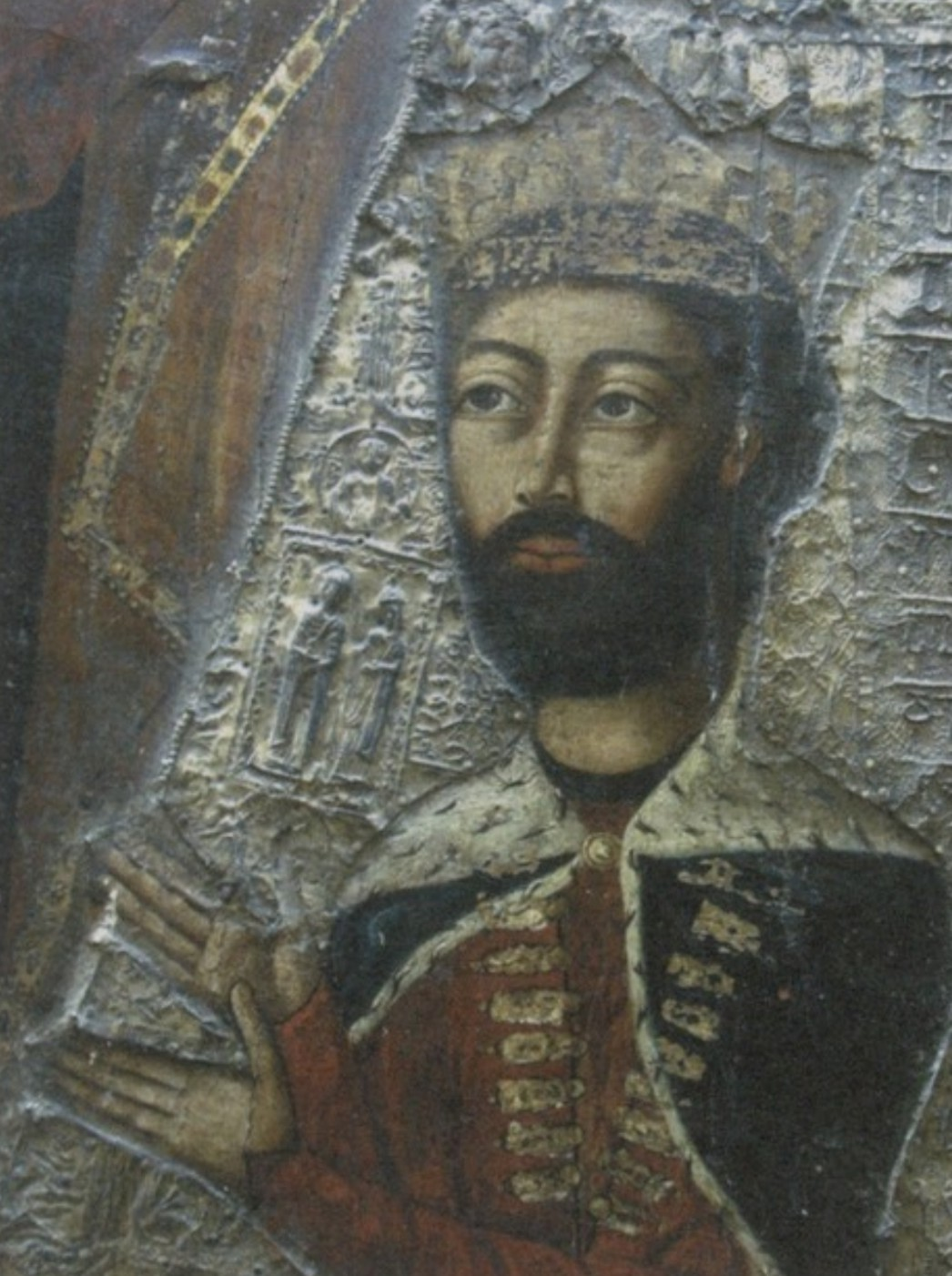
- Bagrat VI.

King of Georgia
- Reign: 1466–1478
- Predecessor: George VIII
- Successor: Constantine II

King of Imereti
- Reign: 1463–1478
- Predecessor: Interregnum
- Successor: Alexander II
- Born: c. 1435
- Died: 1478 (aged 42–43)
- Burial: Gelati Monastery
- Spouse: Helen
- Issue: Prince Vakhtang; Prince George; Alexander II of Imereti
- Dynasty: Bagrationi
- Father: George (son of Constantine I of Georgia)
- Religion: Georgian Orthodox Church (Catholicate of Abkhazia)

Bagrat VI (Georgian: ბაგრატ VI; c. 1435 – 1478), a representative of the Imeretian branch of the Bagrationi dynasty, was a king (mepe) of Imereti (as Bagrat II) from 1463, and a king of Georgia from 1466 until his death.

== Biography ==
Born around 1435, Bagrat was the son of Prince George, youngest son of Constantine I of Georgia. Around 1455, he was granted the title of Eristavi (duke) of Samokalako (Kutaisi, western Imereti, and the surroundings) by the Georgian king George VIII. In the early 1460s, Bagrat supported the rebel prince Qvarqvare II Jaqeli, atabeg (prince) of Samtskhe, and the king deprived Bagrat of his duchy. In 1463, Bagrat led a coalition of western Georgian nobles who met and defeated George VIII at the Battle of Chikhori. Subsequently, Bagrat captured Kutaisi and was crowned king of Imereti. But in return for their aid, the new monarch was obliged to create a principality (samtavro) for each of his four allies. Henceforth the Gelovani clan in Svaneti, the Shervashidze (Sharvashidze) in Abkhazia, the Dadiani in Odishi (Mingrelia), and the Vardanidze in Guria ruled as semi-independent princes.

=== King of Georgia ===
In 1465, after the king George VIII was defeated and imprisoned by Qvarqvare of Samtskhe, Bagrat used the opportunity and crossed the borders of East Georgia (Inner Kartli), where he proclaimed himself King of all Georgia. In fact, he possessed only west Georgia and Inner Kartli and remained mostly in western Georgia. In his western possessions, he also established a separate church, Catholicosate of Abkhazia, independent from the Patriarchate of Mtskheta (i.e., Georgian Orthodox Church). To justify this step, he asked Michael IV, Patriarch of Antioch and Jerusalem, to compose a "Law of Faith" which stated that western and eastern Georgia had different history of conversion and, therefore, they should be independent from each other.

Once freed from captivity, George VIII attempted to recover his throne, but was only able to establish himself in Kakheti, leaving the field in Kartli to his nephew, Constantine who seems to have consolidated his rule in the Lower Kartli in 1469. During this time of triarchy, Georgia was at least twice attacked by Uzun Hasan, the prince of the Ak Koyunlu clan (Münejjim Bashi speaks of three invasions, in 1466, in summer of 1472, and after Uzun Hassan's defeat by the Ottoman Turks in 1476-7). Bagrat had to make peace with the invaders, abandoning Tbilisi to the enemy. It was only after Uzun Hasan's death (1478) when the Georgians were able to recover their capital.

In 1477, Eristav of Odishi, Vameq II Dadiani opposed Bagrat's rule in Western Georgia, he then assembled the Abkhazians and Gurians and began the raids in Imereti. The reaction of the king of Georgia was immediate. Bagrat VI defeated and subdued Vameq II Dadiani.

Bagrat died in 1478, and was succeeded by his son, Alexander II. Bagrat VI was buried at the Gelati Monastery near Kutaisi.

== Family ==
Bagrat was married to a certain Helen (died 3 November 1510). They had three sons:

- Prince Vakhtang (fl. 1455);
- Prince George (fl. 1463–1478);
- Alexander II of Imereti (died 1510), who briefly attempted to claim the throne after his father's death before being deposed, but he successfully established himself as the King of Imereti (r. 1484–1510).

== In historical fiction ==
- Emanuele Rizzardi, L'ultimo Paleologo. PubMe Editor, 2018

== Bibliography ==
- Ivane Javakhishvili, The History of the Georgian Nation, vol. 3 (1982), Tbilisi State University Press, pages 320–340 (In Georgian)
- Ronald Grigor Suny, The Making of the Georgian Nation: 2nd edition (December 1994), Indiana University Press, ISBN 0-253-20915-3, pages 45–46
- Toumanoff, Cyril (1976). Manuel de Généalogie et de Chronologie pour l'histoire de la Caucasie chrétienne (Arménie, Géorgie, Albanie) [Manual of Genealogy and Chronology of Christian Caucasian History (Armenia, Georgia, Albania)] (in French). Rome: Edizioni Aquila.

== Notes ==
Preceded by Interregnum	King of Imereti; 1463–1478	Succeeded by Alexander II
Preceded by George VIII	King of Georgia; 1466–1478	Succeeded by Constantine I
