= Principality of Mingrelia =

1463–1867 feudal state in Georgia

Principality of Mingrelia სამეგრელოს სამთავრო
- 1463–1867
- Flag (1560s according to Diogo Homem) and 18th century flag according to Vakhushti 18th century coat of arms according to Vakhushti

- Principality of Mingrelia after the dissolution of Georgia

- Status: Vassal of the Russian Empire (1803–1867)
- Capital: Zugdidi; 42°34′30″N 41°40′40″E
- Common languages: Mingrelian, Georgian
- Religion: Georgian Orthodox
- Government: Principality
- Prince (Mtavari)
  - 1414–1470 (first): Liparit I Dadiani
  - 1853–1867 (last): Niko I Dadiani
- History
  - Established: 1463
  - Annexation by Imperial Russia: January 4, 1867
Preceded by	Succeeded by
Kingdom of Georgia; Kingdom of Imereti	Russian Empire

The Principality of Mingrelia (Georgian: სამეგრელოს სამთავრო, romanized: samegrelos samtavro), also known as Odishi and as Samegrelo, was a historical state in Georgia ruled by the Dadiani dynasty.

== History ==
The principality emerged out of a non-aggression pact and an ensuing treaty signed by Konstantine II of Kartli, Alexandre of Kakhetia, and Qvarqvare II, atabag of Samtshke, which divided Georgia into three kingdoms and a number of principalities. Mingrelia was established as an independent Principality in 1557 with Levan I Dadiani serving as a hereditary mtavari (Prince). It remained independent until it became a subject to Imperial Russia in 1803. This came after it signed a patronage treaty with the Russian Empire, which was concluded in return for Russian protection against the harassment of Mingrelia's more powerful neighbors, Imeretia and Abkhazia. The principality ultimately came to an end when Prince Niko I Dadiani was deposed, and the principality was abolished, by Russia in 1867. Prince Niko officially renounced his rights to the throne in 1868 and the state became a Russian district until 1917.

== Demographics ==
The population of the principality of Mingrelia in 1865
Districts	Population		Total
Districts	Male	Female	Total
Lechkhumi	14,236	10,916	25,152
Senaki	47,143	37,698	84,841
Zugdidi	38,735	32,064	70,799
Total	100,114	80,678	180,792

== See also ==
- Samegrelo
- Odishi
- Salipartiano
- Bediani
- List of Georgian princes (mtavars)
