= Odishi =

Historical district in western Georgia

Odishi ოდიში
- Historical region
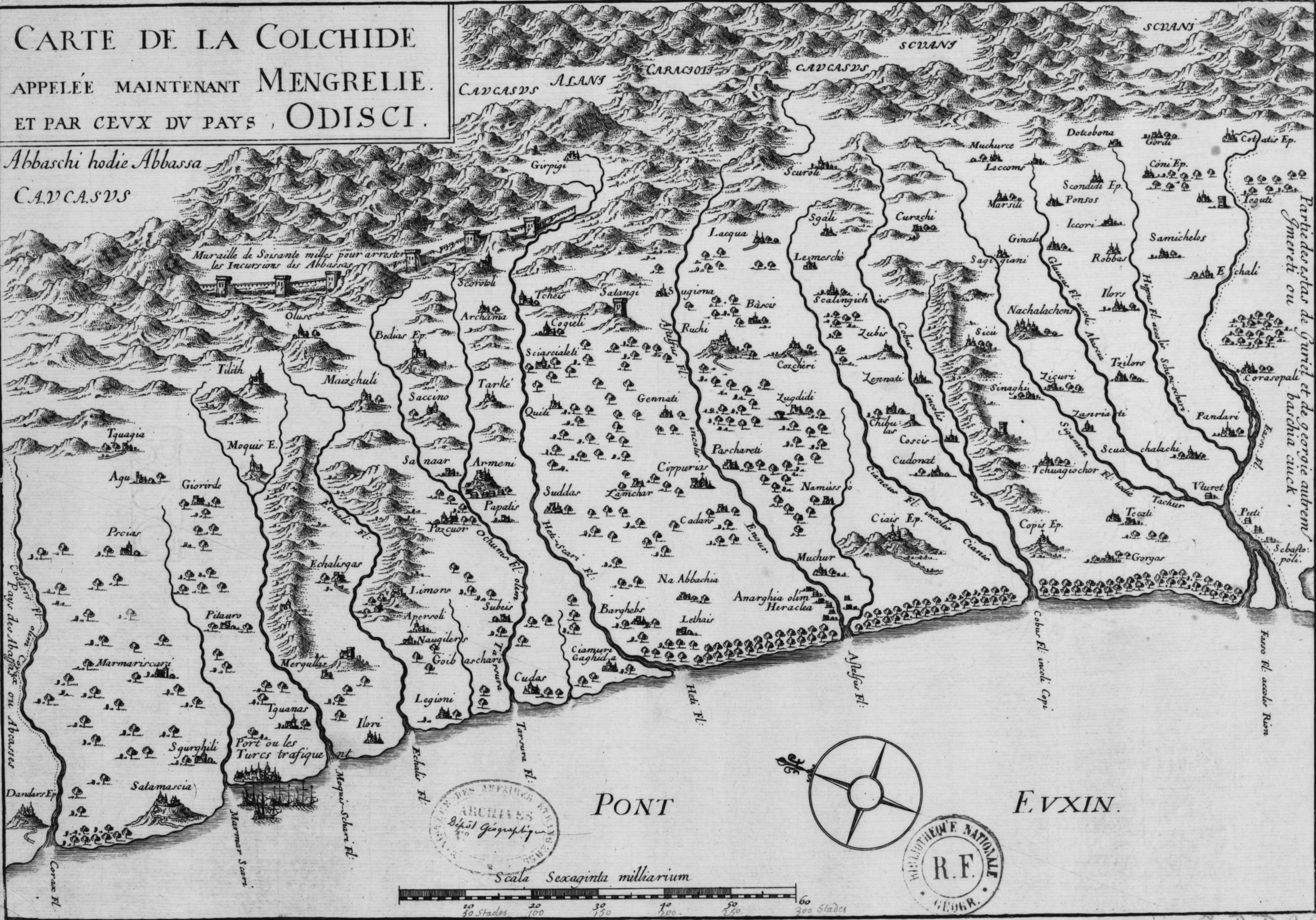
- A map of Odishi, originally by Archangelo Lamberti, 1654.

- Flag Coat of arms

- Coordinates: 42°34′30″N 41°40′40″E
- Country: Georgia
- Largest city: Zugdidi
- Since the early 19th century, toponym Odishi has been supplanted by Samegrelo (Mingrelia)

Odishi (Georgian: ოდიში [ˈo̞d̪iʃi]) was a historical district in western Georgia, the core fiefdom of the former Principality of Mingrelia, with which the name "Odishi" was frequently coterminous. Since the early 19th century, this toponym has been supplanted by Mingrelia (Samegrelo).

== Geography ==
Like most historical regions of Georgia, Odishi had fluctuating borders. It was bounded by the Black Sea to the west and the Tskhenistsqali river to the east; to the northwest, Odishi bordered and at times expanded into Abkhazia; to the north were the mountains of Takveri, that is, the letter-day Lechkhumi, and Svaneti; and the Rioni river formed the border between Odishi and Guria to the south. In its narrower sense, Odishi referred to a tract of land between the Inguri and Tekhuri rivers, bathed by the Black Sea. The chief town and largest settlement was Zugdidi. Chqondidi at Martvili served as the principal Christian cathedral. A Georgian demonym for the people of Odishi was odishari.

== Etymology ==
The etymology of Odishi is not clear. According to Georgy Klimov, in Mingrelian the term Odishi breaks down as Od-ish-i, where od- goes back to Proto-Kartvelian *ad- (yellow azalea) and -ish- is a topoformative element. There also is an explanation of this name in Laz, Odi-shi (Odişi) meaning "From Odi". The early-18th-century Georgian scholar Prince Vakhushti of Kartli, who included a detailed geographical account of the region in his Description of the Kingdom of Georgia, suggested a folk etymology of Odishi as meaning "once [odeshi] this land was ours." A modern hypothesis relates Odishi to a pagan deity from the Mingrelian folklore, named Odi. The name of Odishi survives in those of a plateau in western Georgia, a village in the Zugdidi Municipality, and a broadcasting company based in Zugdidi.

== History ==
Odishi first appears in the Georgian Chronicles under the reign of Queen Tamar (r. 1184–1213) as a fief ruled by the eristavi ("duke") of the dynasty with gentilitial titles of Bediani and Dadiani, derived from the respective localities. The dynasty, henceforth surnamed Dadiani, acceded to the rank of sovereign princes after the dissolution of the Kingdom of Georgia in the 1490s. Natively, and in the early modern Georgian historical literature, Odishi was the name of both the district and the whole Dadiani-ruled principality. The latter came to be known to the Europeans as Mingrelia after the principal group of people inhabiting it, but they were also familiar with Odishi as the name of one of the two principal subdivisions of the Principality of Mingrelia, the other being Lechkhumi. The Georgian equivalent of Mingrelia, Samegrelo, although referenced in much earlier records, did not enter the common usage until after the imposition of the Imperial Russian hegemony in 1804. The Mingrelian signatory to the 1804 treaty with Russia, Prince Grigol Dadiani, referred to himself as the "lawful Lord of Odishi, Lechkhumi, Svaneti, Abkhazia, and all the lands anciently belonging to the ancestors of mine."
