= Battle of Alinja =

Late 14th century battle

- Part of the Timurid–Georgian wars
Date	1399
Location	Alinja, in modern day Azerbaijan
Result	Georgian victory

Belligerents
Kingdom of Georgia: Caucasian allies	Timurid Empire

Commanders and leaders
George VII	Seif ad-Din; Abu Bakr

The Battle of Alinja took place in 1399 at the Alinja Fortress, located in present-day Nakhchivan, Azerbaijan. King George VII of Georgia, seeking to break the siege laid by Timurid forces, led a coalition of Georgian and Caucasian allies to successfully relieve the fortress and defeat a Timurid reinforcement army. This victory, however, provoked a brutal retaliatory campaign by Timur, which devastated Georgia and the surrounding regions in the following years.

== Background ==
Since 1386, Timur had launched multiple invasions, devastating Georgia's cities, killing civilians, and forcing George VII into submission at various points. However, the Georgian king continued to resist Timurid dominance.

Since 1388, the Timurids had laid siege to the Jalayirids at Alinja. During a brief lull in the siege, Tahir, the son of Ahmad Jalayir, ruler of the Jalayirid Sultanate, arrived to strengthen the defenses of the fortress. In 1396, Timur appointed Miran Shah as the governor of Azerbaijan and tasked him with the siege of Alinja. Meanwhile, in 1398, Timur himself led a massive army to invade India. That same year, Miran Shah’s forces constructed a wall around Alinja, effectively severing all communication between the fortress and the outside world.

== Battle ==
In 1399, George VII of Georgia attacked the Timurid army besieging the castle of Alinja. The Georgian army cut its way through the besiegers temporarily freeing the Jalayirid Prince Tahir and some of those inside the castle, while the Timurid general Seif ad-Din fled.

While the Georgian army was withdrawing from the castle, an army sent by Miran Shah under the command of Abu Bakr arrived and a battle broke out. As the Timurid army advanced the Georgians attacked, resulting in a Georgian victory. Abu Bakr retreated to Tabriz.

== Sources ==
- Bedrosian, Robert (1997). "Armenian during the Seljuk and Mongol Periods". In Hovannisian, Richard G. (ed.). The Armenian People From Ancient to Modern Times. Vol. I: The Dynastic Periods: From Antiquity to the Fourteenth Century. St. Martin's Press.
- Baumer, Christoph (2023). History of the Caucasus. Bloomsbury Publishing. ISBN 9780755636303.
- Javakhishvili, Ivane (1949). ქართველი ერის ისტორია, ტომი III [History of the Georgian nation, volume III] (in Georgian). Tbilisi: Metsniereba.
- Minorsky, Vladimir (1930). "Transcaucasia". Journal Asiatique (in French). Librairie Orientaliste: 41–112.
- Rayfield, Donald (2012). Edge of Empires. Reaktion Books.
