= George (son of Constantine I of Georgia) =

Co-King of Georgia
- Reign: 1408–1412
- With: Constantine I; Alexander; Bagrat
- Died: 1435/1446
- Issue: Bagrat VI; Princess Gaiane
- Dynasty: Bagrationi
- Father: Constantine I of Georgia
- Mother: Natia Amirejibi
- Religion: Georgian Orthodox Church

George (Georgian: გიორგი, romanized: giorgi; died between 1435 and 1466) was a Georgian prince (batonishvili) of the Bagrationi dynasty who served as co-king of Georgia from c. 1408 to 1412. He was the father of Bagrat VI, King of Imereti and King of Georgia.

== Biography ==
Prince George was the third and youngest son of King Constantine I of Georgia and his wife, Natia, daughter of Prince Kutsna Amirejibi. Between c. 1408 and 1412, he was associated in the kingship by his father alongside his two elder brothers, Alexander and Bagrat, as co-king of Georgia. He had a son, Bagrat VI (c. 1435–1478), who reigned as King of Imereti from 1463 to 1478 and as King of Georgia from 1466 to 1478, and a daughter, Gaiane, who married Prince Amirindo Amilakhvari.

George is presumed to have died between 1435, when Bagrat was born, and 1466, when an agape was established for the repose of his soul.

== Bibliography ==
- Toumanoff, Cyril (1990). Les dynasties de la Caucasie chrétienne de l'Antiquité jusqu'au XIXe siècle (in French). Rome: Tables généalogiques et chronologiques.
- Toumanoff, Cyril (1949–1951). "The Fifteenth-Century Bagratids and the Institution of Collegial Sovereignty in Georgia". Traditio. 7: 169–221. doi:10.1017/S0362152900015142. JSTOR 27830207.
