= Timur's South Georgia Campaign =

1399 invasion of Georgia by Timur

Timur's Georgian campaign (1399)
- Part of the Timurid invasions of Georgia
Date	1399
Location	Kakheti and Hereti, Kingdom of Georgia
Result	Timurid victory

Belligerents
Kingdom of Georgia	Timurid Empire; Shirvanshah

Commanders and leaders
(Kingdom of Georgia) George VII	Timur; Ibrahim I

Strength
Unknown	100,000

The Timur's South Georgian campaign was an invasion led by Timur and Ibrahim I of Shirvan against George VII of Georgia in retaliation for George's role in the siege of Alinja.

== Background ==
In 1398, Timur was campaigned in India. The people of Caucasus took advantage of this and rebelled. King George VII established an alliance with the representatives of the Jalayirid Sultanate, who were still fighting against Timur. Taher, one of the Jalaiyirid's noblemen, has been under siege in Alinja prison in Nakhchivan for 10 years. The herders, who fell into extreme hardship, asked King George for help. Sayyid Ali, the rebel ruler of Shaki, also asked King George for help.

King George gathered the Georgian army, the North Caucasians were rescued and together with Sayyid Ali attacked the fortress of Alinja. King George defeated and expelled the Timurids. He strengthened the fortress with new soldiers and weapons and supplied it with food and supplies. Tahir was brought to Georgia. Those who turned back were surrounded by the army sent by Miranshah. Georgians also defeated them (Syidi Ali died in this battle).

The news about Caucasian rebellion reached Tamerlane in India. In 1399, he returned to Samarkand and started preparing for a seven-year campaign. The main goal of this campaign was the final conquest and Islamization of Georgia, or its destruction.

== The Campaign ==
In the winter of 1399 during the Timurid invasions of Georgia, Timur breached the borders of Kingdom of Georgia with 100,000 specially chosen soldiers, under Timur, and Ibrahim I of Shirvan. They then crossed Kura on a patoon bridge, and hacked the path with machetes to avoid Georgian sentries. They caught Kakheti, and Hereti by surprise before they could flee, and hide their property. A Georgian general Khimisha delayed the Timurids by tactical evasion, and those who were forewarned escaped to the caves and forests. Timur's forces looted and burned churches and monasteries. They slaughtered civilians in their hiding places. Tens of thousands were pressed into slavery or were massacred, and southern Georgia became occupied by Timur and his forces.
