= St. Gevorg Monastery (Khanagah) =

Ruinous Armenian monastery in Nakhchivan, Azerbaijan

- Սուրբ Գևորգ վանք
- St. Gevorg Monastery
- Location: Xanəgah, Julfa
- Country: Azerbaijan
- Denomination: Armenian Apostolic Church

History
- Status: Destroyed
- Founded: 9th century

Architecture
- Demolished: October 7, 2001 – November 11, 2009

St. Gevorg Monastery was a ruinous Armenian monastery located near Khanagah village (Julfa District) of the Nakhchivan Autonomous Republic of Azerbaijan. The monastery was located on a hill, approximately 3 km northeast of Yernjak (Alinja) fortress.

== History ==
The monastery was founded in the 9th century; in 841 a church council met here. It is mentioned by the 13th-century historian Stepanos Orbelian. It was renovated in the 14th and 17th centuries.

== Architecture ==
The monastery was a vaulted building with a single-chamber nave. It had a semicircular apse, entryways in the northern and western facades, a vestry along the northern facade, and a porch on the west.

== Destruction ==
The monastery was in ruins in the late Soviet period and the ruins were still intact on October 7, 2001. However, by November 11, 2009, the foundations of the monastery had been razed, the blocks removed, and the site graded, as documented by investigation of the Caucasus Heritage Watch.
