= Tsotne Dadiani =

Georgian nobleman

Saint Tsotne Dadiani
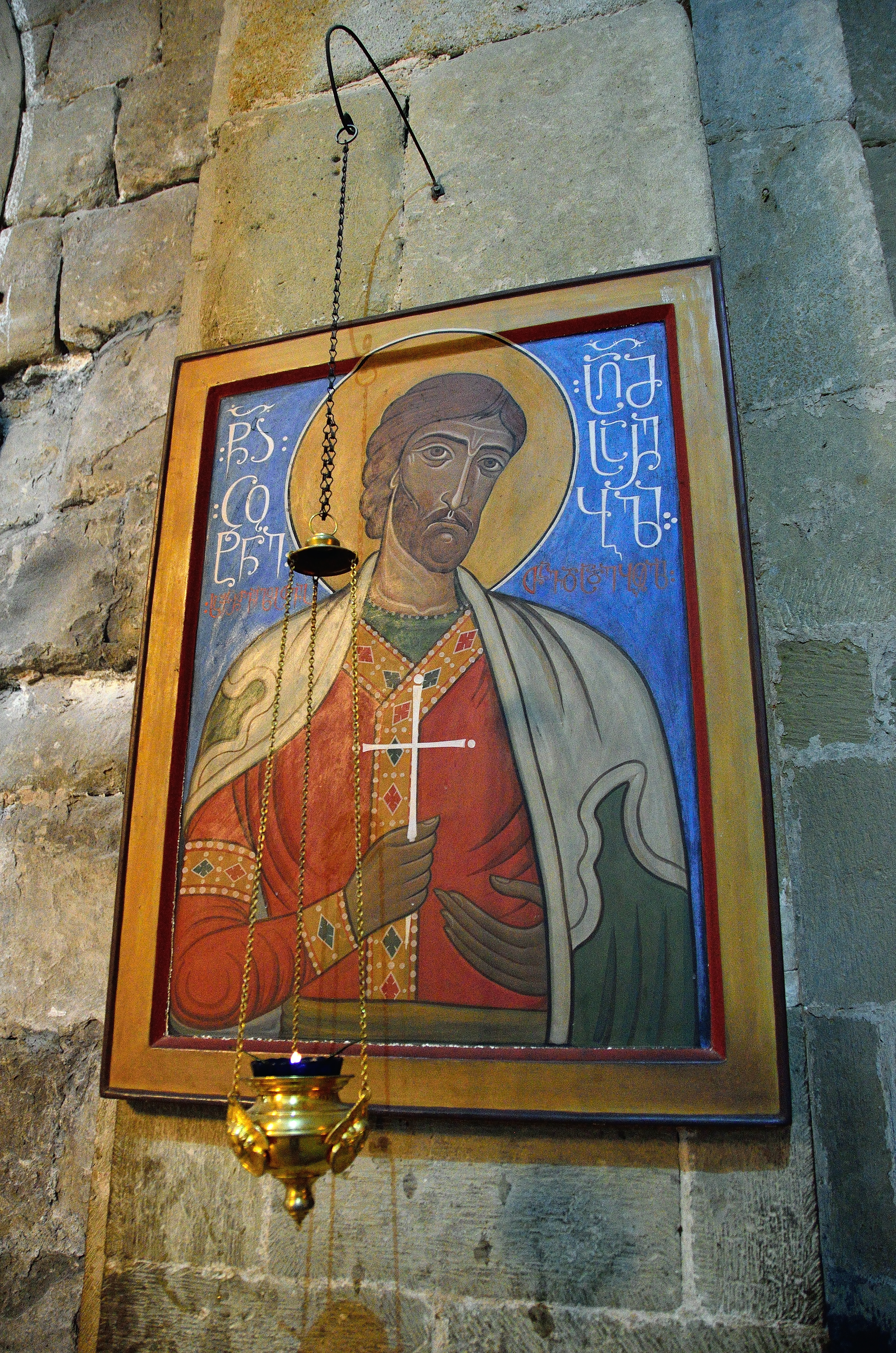
- Icon of Tsotne Dadiani at Svetitskhoveli Cathedral.

Confessor of the Faith
- Born: Kingdom of Georgia
- Died: c. 1260
- Venerated in: Eastern Orthodox Church
- Canonized: 1999 by Patriarch Ilia II
- Feast: 12 August [O.S. 30 July]

Tsotne Dadiani (Georgian: ცოტნე დადიანი) (died c. 1260) was a Georgian nobleman of the House of Dadiani and one of the leading political figures in the time of Mongol ascendancy in Georgia. Around 1246, he was part of a failed plot aimed at overthrowing the Mongol hegemony, but survived arrest and torture in captivity that befell upon his fellow conspirators when their designs to stage a rebellion was betrayed to the Mongols. A story from the medieval Georgian annals relating Tsotne's insistence on sharing his accomplices' fate that moved the Mongols to mercy made him a popular historical figure and a saint of the Georgian Orthodox Church.

== Sources and family background ==
Tsotne Dadiani came of the noble family, which was in possession of Odishi, latter-day Mingrelia, in western Georgia. The principal source on his biography is the early 14th-century anonymous Chronicle of a Hundred Years, which is included in the corpus of Georgian Chronicles and relates the history of Georgia from c. 1213 to c. 1320. Tsotne Dadiani is identified by various modern scholars with several historical persons known from medieval sources. These are:

- The boy-nobleman Tsotne depicted with his father Shergil Dadiani and mother Nateli in a fresco in the Dadiani chapel (eukterion) in the Khobi Monastery, with identifying inscriptions. These three persons are also mentioned in an inscription of the icon in which the precious cross pendant of Queen Tamar was encased.
- Tsotne Dadiani, mandaturtukhutsesi ("Lord High Steward") and eristavt-eristavi ("Duke of Dukes"), mentioned in a document from the Monastery of the Cross in Jerusalem, instituting an agape for him for 12 June.
- Dadian-Bediani, son of Juansher, mentioned in the Chronicle of a Hundred Years. The person with this name, Bediani being a territorial epithet, and the title of mandaturtukhutsesi is also known from the icon inscriptions from Martvili and Khobi. These inscriptions also identify Dadiani's wife Khuashak, a daughter of Bega, eristavi of Kartli, and their sons: George, Ioane, and Erashahr.

== Political career ==
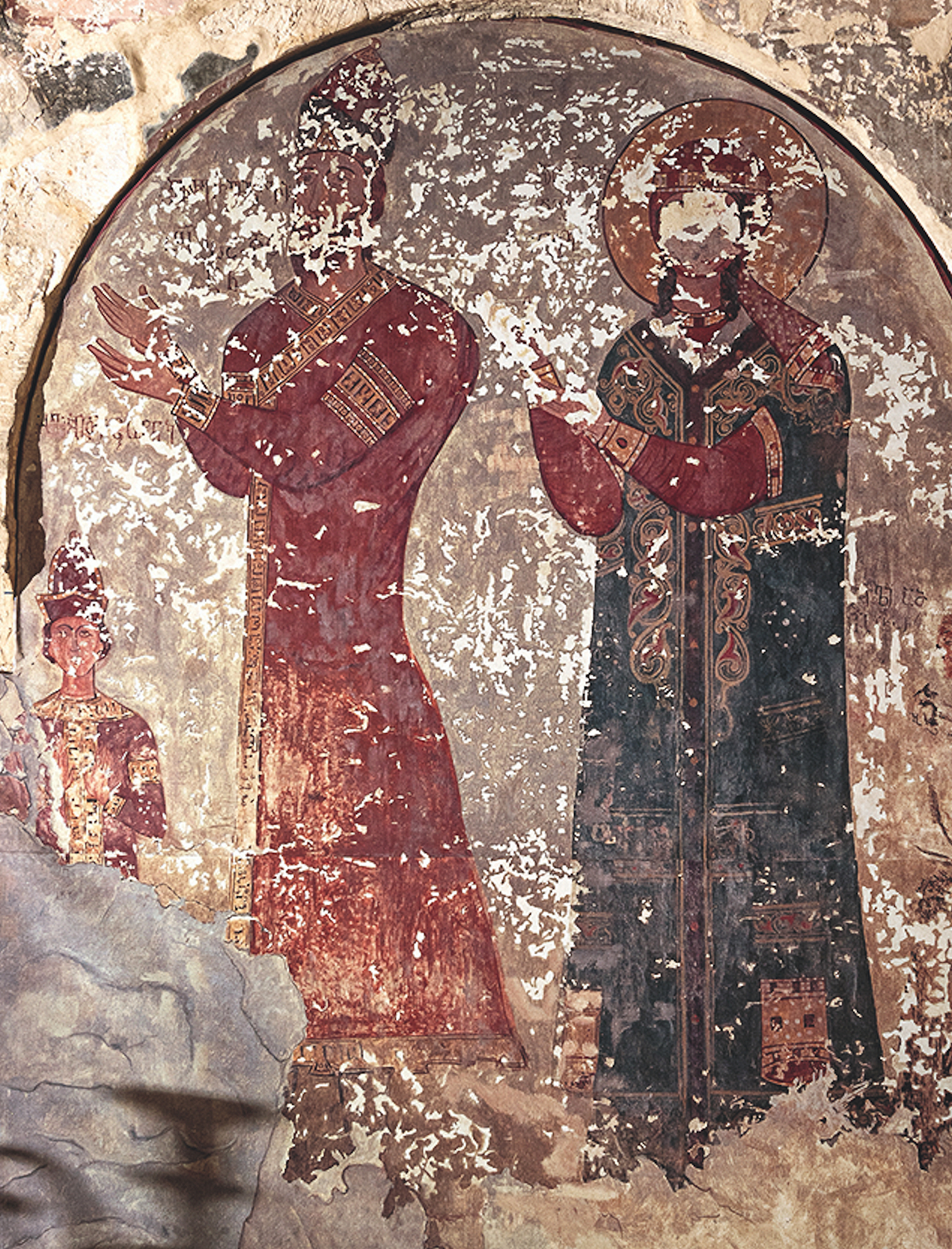
Tsotne Dadiani as a child with his parents. A fresco from the Khobi Monastery

Tsotne Dadiani's career unfolded against the background of decline of Georgia as a major regional power in the face of the Khwarazmian and Mongol invasions. Around 1228, Tsotne was among the commanders of a large army summoned by Queen Rusudan to free Georgia from the Khwarazmian troops of Jalal al-Din Mangburni. In the ensuing battle of Bolnisi, en route to Tbilisi, the Georgian army was defeated and Tbilisi once again fell to Jalal al-Din. After Rusudan's death, the throne of Georgia lay disputed in view of rival claims from her son David and his namesake cousin, a natural son of Rusudan's brother and predecessor, King George IV. Tsotne Dadiani was among the supporters of David, son of Rusudan. During this period of interregnum (1245–1250), with the two Davids absent at the court of the Khagan in Karakorum, the Mongols divided the Kingdom of Georgia into eight districts (tumen), each governed by a leading Georgian noble. In this territorial arrangement, Tsotne Dadiani shared the governorship of western Georgia with Kakhaber, eristavi of Racha.

=== Kokhtastavi conspiracy ===
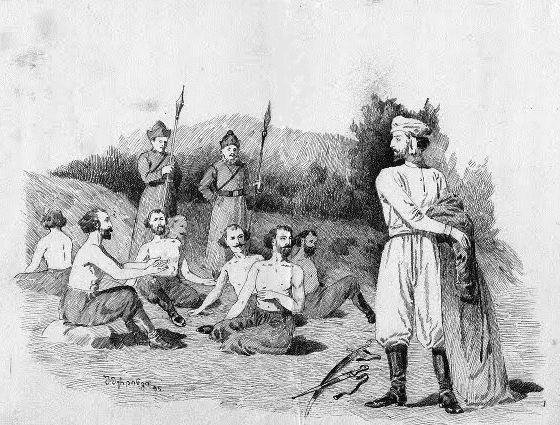
"Tsotne Dadiani", an illustration by Oscar Schmerling to Iakob Gogebashvili's collection of stories The Devoted Georgians, 1895.

Around 1246, Tsotne Dadiani joined other Georgian nobles in a clandestine meeting at the castle of Kokhtastavi, in Javakheti, to discuss an overthrow of the Mongol overlordship. The Mongols promptly learned about the summit and rounded up its participants, who, having no troops by their side, surrendered without resistance. The only survivors were Tsotne and the eristavi of Racha who had left earlier to recruit troops in their remote provinces. The arrested Georgian dignitaries, on being brought to Shirakavan before the noyan Chormaqan, insisted that they had no intention of rebelling, but had merely met to arrange the levying of the kharaj, or tribute to be paid to the Mongols. The noyan did not believe this and had the Georgians stripped naked, bound their hands and feet, and left suffering under the scorching sun,. According to one account, from Prince Vakhushti's history, their bodies were smeared with honey to attract insects.

In the meantime, Tsotne Dadiani arrived with his army to the appointed rendezvous at Rkinis-Juari between Samtskhe and Ghado. Upon hearing what had happened, he dismissed his army and, in the company of two servants, headed to Shirakavan. When he saw the prisoners, Dadiani took off his clothes and joined them. When interrogated, he maintained that the Georgians had no design to revolt and demanded to be executed if that was the punishment of others. Impressed, the noyan took Dadiani's self-sacrifice move as a testimony to the Georgians' innocence and set them free.

== Later years ==
After David's return to Georgia in 1250 and his accession to rule in Imereti, the western moiety of the Georgian kingdom, Dadiani stood by his side. He was responsible for bringing a relative order and stability to his fiefdom of Odishi. He died c. 1260.

== Memory ==
The story of Tsotne Dadiani made him one of the most popular medieval historical figures in Georgia. On 26 October 1999, he was canonized by the Holy Synod of the Georgian Orthodox Church as Saint Tsotne Dadiani the Confessor, instituting his feast day on 30 July.
