= Vameq I Dadiani =

Duke of Odishi (1396)

Duke of Mingrelia
- Reign: 1384–1396
- Predecessor: George II Dadiani
- Successor: Mamia II Dadiani
- Died: 1396
- Issue: Mamia II Dadiani
- House: Dadiani
- Father: George II Dadiani
- Religion: Georgian Orthodox Church

Vameq I Dadiani (Georgian: ვამეყ I დადიანი; died 1396) was a member of the House of Dadiani and eristavi ("duke") of Odishi in western Georgia from 1384 until his death.

== Biography ==
Vameq succeeded on the death of his father, George II Dadiani, as duke of Odishi (latter-day Mingrelia) in 1384. According to the early 18th-century Georgian historian Prince Vakhushti of Kartli, Vameq's status was confirmed by King Bagrat V of Georgia. Like his father, Vameq also had the title of mandaturtukhutsesi ("Lord High Steward") of the Kingdom of Georgia.

During Vameq's tenure, Georgia was subjected to a series of invasions by the Turco-Mongol emir Timur, of which the kingdom's northwestern provinces were largely spared. George I of Imereti, a scion of the former kings of Imereti, who took advantage of this and proclaimed himself an independent king in 1389. Many of the western Georgian nobles' reaction to this move was hostile and George launched a campaign against Dadiani, hoping his victory over the strongest of the western Georgian nobles would bend others into submission. He was defeated and killed in a battle with Vameq, who then invited King George VII of Georgia to reoccupy Imereti.

Vameq's military exploits are also celebrated in an inscription from the Khobi Monastery, according to which, Dadiani led a victorious campaign against the Zygii and reduced the fortresses of Gagari (modern Gagra) and Ugagi. Thence he removed a large collection of marble columns, capitals and fragments of the ambo. These pieces of stonemasonry, some of them of Byzantine origin and dating from the 5th century, were used to construct a chapel in the Khobi Cathedral. Vameq was also a benefactor to another major regional cathedral, that of Tsalenjikha, which was frescoed by the Constantinopolitan artist Kyr Manuel Eugenikos at Vameq's behest. Vameq died in 1396 and was succeeded by his son, Mamia II Dadiani.

Vameq I Dadiani House of Dadiani Born: ? Died: 1396
Regnal titles
Preceded by George II Dadiani	Duke of Mingrelia; 1384–1396	Succeeded by Mamia II Dadiani
