= George I Dadiani =

Giorgi I Dadiani (Georgian: გიორგი I დადიანი; died 1323) was a member of the House of Dadiani and eristavi ("duke") of Odishi in western Georgia from the late 13th century until his death.

The principal source on Giorgi Dadiani is the early-18th-century history by Prince Vakhushti of Kartli, who does not report his parentage; the primary sources available to him have been lost. Giorgi Dadiani is also known from undated inscriptions, in the Georgian asomtavruli script, from the territory of Odishi, which allow reconstruction of his genealogy. He was a son of mandaturt-ukhutsesi ("Lord High Steward") Bediani-Dadiani by his wife Khuashak, daughter of Bega, eristavi of Kartli, and had two brothers, Ioane and Erashahr. Giorgi is depicted in a fresco on the northern wall of the Khobi Cathedral, his own foundation, with a model of the church in his hands. An accompanying inscription identifies him as mandaturt-ukhutsesi. Giorgi is further mentioned in two agapes from the Monastery of the Cross in Jerusalem.

Giorgi Dadiani held sway over his patrimonial princedom of Odishi, latter-day Mingrelia, in the time when the Kingdom of Georgia, under the heavy-handed hegemony of the Mongol Ilkhans, suffered political division and was embroiled in a series of internecine feuds. Its western moiety, Imereti, of which Odishi was part, had also been fighting its own civil war between the successors of King David Narin—Constantine and Michael. Giorgi Dadiani capitalized on these disorders to assert more autonomy for himself. He, further, seized the duchy of Tskhumi and the Black Sea coastline in Abkhazia up to Anacopia. According to Vakhushti, Giorgi died in 1323 and was succeeded by his son, Mamia I.

George I Dadiani House of Dadiani Born: ? Died: 1323
Regnal titles
Preceded by Tsotne Dadiani?	Duke of Mingrelia ?–1323	Succeeded by Mamia I Dadiani
