= Siege of Tbilisi (1386) =

Successful siege of the city of Tbilisi by the Timurid army

- Part of the Timurid invasions of Georgia
Date	1386
Location	Tbilisi, Kingdom of Georgia 41°43′N 44°47′E
Result	Timurid victory

Belligerents
Kingdom of Georgia	Timurid Empire

Commanders and leaders
Bagrat V (POW)	Timur

Strength
Unknown	20,000–30,000

Casualties and losses
Heavy	Unknown

The siege of Tbilisi was the successful siege of the city of Tbilisi, capital of the Kingdom of Georgia, by the Turco-Mongol conqueror Timur, which ended on 22 November 1386. The official history of his reign, Zafarnama, represents this invasion in Georgia as a jihad.

== Siege ==
In late autumn 1386, a huge army of Timur Invaded Georgia. Timur set out from Kars and assailed Samtskhe, the southernmost principality within the Kingdom of Georgia later in 1386. From there, he marched to Tbilisi which the Georgian king Bagrat V had fortified. Tbilisi was besieged and taken on 22 November 1386, after a fierce fight. The city was pillaged and Bagrat V and his family were imprisoned.

== Aftermath ==
The Georgian Chronicle and Armenian Thomas of Metsoph mention the apostasy of the king but represent it as a clever ruse which enabled him to earn a degree of trust from Timur. Bagrat was given some 12,000 troops to reestablish himself in Georgia whose government was run by Bagrat's son and co-ruler George VII during his father's absence at Timur's court. The old king, however, entered in secret negotiations with George who ambushed Bagrat's Islamic escort, and freed his father.
