= Truce of Shamkor =

1401 truce between Georgia and the Timurid Empire

Truce of Shamkor
1401
The Truce of Shamkor was made between the Kingdom of Georgia and the Timurid Empire.

The Truce of Shamkor was a truce agreed to by King George VII of the Kingdom of Georgia and Timur, ruler of the Timurid Empire, on September 1401, which lasted for few months. In late 1401, Timur invaded Georgia again.

George VII sued for peace and sent his brother, Constantine, with the contributions. Timur was preparing for a major confrontation with the Ottoman dynasty and wished to freeze the currently prevailing situation in Georgia until he could return to deal with it more decisively at his leisure. Thus, he made peace with George on several terms:

Georgia would

- pay annual tribute;
- provide troops for Timur;
- allow Timur's armies transit;
- special privileges for Muslims;
- not practise Christianity on Muslim territory.

Timur gave the Georgian ambassadors fine gowns and a good send-off, pleased that "the obstinate have put their heads into the yoke of submission". He then undertook some preventive measures, broke the treaty, attacked the Georgian garrison of Tortumi, demolished the citadel and looted the surrounding area.
