= Kutsna Amirejibi =

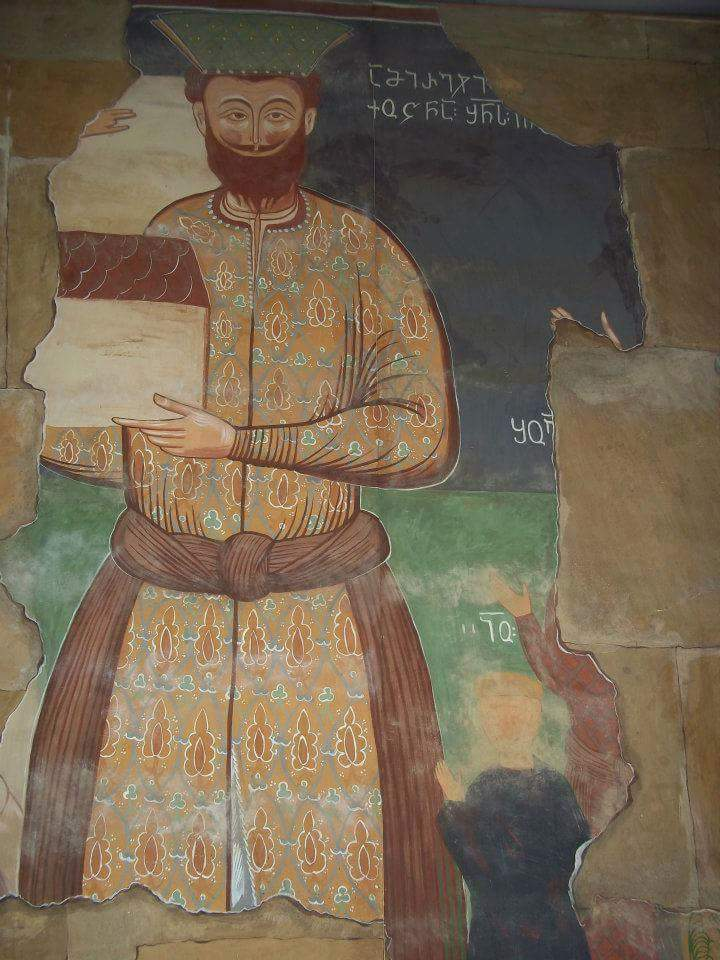
- A fresco of Kutsna from the Nabakhtevi Virgin Mary Church.
- Native name: ქუცნა ამირეჯიბი
- Born: fl. 1350; Kingdom of Georgia
- Died: 1410s
- Allegiance: Kingdom of Georgia

Kutsna Amirejibi (Georgian: ქუცნა ამირეჯიბი), also known as Kutsna the Chamberlain (fl. 1350–1415) was a Georgian nobleman active during and in the aftermath of Timur's invasions of Georgia. He was a father-in-law of King Constantine I of Georgia and a maternal grandfather of King Alexander I of Georgia.

== Origin ==
It is not completely clear to which noble house Kutsna belonged. The latter part of his name, Amirejibi, or sometimes written as Amiredjibi, indicates his being a Prince-Chamberlain of the Kingdom of Georgia, but it is also the surname of the aristocratic family better documented from the early 17th century. Modern genealogists in Georgia have accepted the notion that Kutsna was one of the earliest members of that family as plausible. In the view of the historian Cyril Toumanoff, the praenomen of Kutsna as well as that of his grandfather Kurtsik (Khurtsik) may suggest that he belonged to the feudal house of Khurtsikidze or Khurtsidze from Samtskhe. In his charter, Kutsna mentions his homonymous ancestor as having been a constable of Georgia under Queen Regnant Rusudan (r. 1223–1245). But between the constableship of Zakaria II Mkhargrdzeli (who died in 1212) and that of his nephew Avag-Sargis III Mkhargrdzeli (who filled that office from 1233/4 to 1250), the incumbents of it are not known.

== Career and family ==
Kutsna was married to the lady called Rusa (Rusudan; died 1413). Their daughter, Natia, became the consort of King Constantine I of Georgia and mothered Alexander I, at the time of whose birth c. 1390 Kutsna was ambassador to Constantinople. The chronicles describe him as the one who was "greatly ennobled by the kings" and who "headed the army". Both Kutsna and his wife Rusa are known for their restoration of churches and monasteries in the aftermath of Timur's devastations; Kutsna patronized the churches of Ulumba and Nabakhtevi, and Rusa undertook the restoration of the principal cathedral of the Living Pillar at Mtskheta. She also directed the education of Alexander I and influenced the future king's preoccupations and his enthusiasm for religious building.

Kutsna appears in the contemporary records for the last time in 1415. He was succeeded by his son Ramin as the head of the family. Kutsna's fresco portrait as well as those of his wife and four children survive in the Nabakhtevi church, in Shida Kartli, east of Surami.

== See also ==
- Iotam Zedgenidze
