= Helen (wife of Bagrat V of Georgia) =

Queen of Georgia from 1360 to 1366

Helen (Georgian: ელენე, romanized: elene) (died 1366), is the name given for the first wife of King Bagrat V of Georgia. Her first name is recorded in The Georgian Chronicles,

== Biography ==
Helen died in 1366, victim to a plague which had spread across Georgia during the 1350s and 1360s (possibly a recurrence of the Black Death).

A year after her death, her husband married Anna of Trebizond.

According to the Georgian Chronicle, Helen was survived by two children:

- George VII of Georgia
- David. Otherwise unknown.

Helen (wife of Bagrat V of Georgia) Born: 14th century Died: 1366
Royal titles
Vacant Title last held by Sindukhtar Jaqeli	Queen consort of Georgia; 1360–1366	Succeeded by Anna of Trebizond, Queen of Georgia
