= Siege of Alinja =

- Part of the Timurid conquests and invasions
Date	c. 1388–1401
Location	Alinja Tower
Result	Timurid victory (Note: "In the war against the conqueror Timur-e Lang, the fortress resisted a thirteen-year siege and only capitulated in 1401...")

Belligerents
Jalayirid Sultanate: Caucasian allies	Timurid Empire

Commanders and leaders
Tahir	Timur; Muhammad Miraka; Muhammad Darvis; Miran Shah; Seif ad-Din; Abu Bakr ibn Miran Shah

The siege of Alinja occurred between the armies of the Jalayirid Sultanate and Timurid Empire starting in 1388. Two offensives by the Qara Qoyunlu would interrupt the sieges, but by 1396 Miran Shah had resumed besieging the fortress. In 1399, George VII of Georgia attacked the Timurids and released some of those who had been imprisoned. In retaliation, Timur ravaged southern Georgia and northern Armenia, killing, destroying, and enslaving people. The fortress managed to withstand the intermittent siege, but faced with starvation, surrendered in 1401.

== Siege ==
=== 1388‐1398 ===
In 1388, (Note: Vladimir Minorsky states the siege began in 1387) the Timurid army besieged the Jalayirids at Alinja. The defenders locked themselves inside the citadel while the lower fortifications were captured by Timur's troops. The Jalayrids were about to surrender, due to a lack of water, when a sudden downpour filled the cisterns in the citadel, allowing them to resist the siege. Timur gave Muhammad Miraka the order to start the final assault on the citadel, but Miraka was called back to Timur's camp after Qara Mahammad of the Qara Qoyunlu launched an offensive, which may have temporarily ended the siege.

In 1394, Timur sent Muhammad Darvis from Mus with the goal of resuming the siege, along with reinforcements. Prince Miran-Shah arrived in Timur's camp towards the end of 1394, traveling from the Alinjak region. All of the troops in the area were concentrated in Tabriz as a result of a fresh offensive launched by Qara Yusuf of the Qara Qoyunlu in 1394 on the side of Ala-Tag, and it is possible that the siege was eased at this point.

During the lull in the sieges, Tahir, son of Ahmad Jalayir, the ruler of Jalayirid Sultanate, arrived to strengthen the fortress. Miran Shah, who was appointed to Azarbaijan in 1396, was given the command to besiege to Alinja. By 1398, Miran Shah's forces had built a wall around Alinja, effectively cutting off its communication with the outside world.

=== 1399 ===
In 1399, George VII of Georgia gathered the Georgian, North Caucasians (Simsim), and Shaki army and attacked the Timurid besiegers. They rescued Tahir and freed some of those inside the castle, Miran Shah's general Seif ad-Din fled to Tabriz. Sidi Ahmad Ogulsai and three Georgian nobles took Tahir's place inside the fortress.

While the Georgian army was withdrawing, an army sent by Miran Shah under the command of his son Abu Bakr arrived and a battle broke out. The Georgians attacked and the Timurid army was defeated. Abu Bakr retreated to Tabriz.

=== 1399-1401 ===
In retaliation, Tamerlane ravaged southern Georgia and northern Armenia, killing, destroying, and enslaving people. This bloody campaign lasted for several months, with Timur's armies systematically moving from province to province. Virtually all major cities and towns were destroyed and their populations decimated; the countryside (with its villages and food sources) was burnt; monasteries and churches were systematically razed to the ground. Of those who survived the fighting and reprisals, many thousands died of hunger and disease, and 60,000 survivors were enslaved and carried away by Timur's troops.

The fortress of Alinja managed to withstand the continued siege, but faced with starvation, surrendered in 1401.

== Sources ==
- Bedrosian, Robert (1997). "Armenian during the Seljuk and Mongol Periods". In Hovannisian, Richard G. (ed.). The Armenian People From Ancient to Modern Times. Vol. I: The Dynastic Periods: From Antiquity to the Fourteenth Century. St. Martin's Press.
- Baumer, Christoph (2023). History of the Caucasus. Bloomsbury Publishing. ISBN 9780755636303.
- Javakhishvili, Ivane (1949). ქართველი ერის ისტორია, ტომი III [History of the Georgian nation, volume III] (in Georgian). Tbilisi: Metsniereba.
- Minorsky, Vladimir (1930). "Transcaucasia". Journal Asiatique (in French). Librairie Orientaliste: 41–112.
- Minorsky, Vladmir (1987). "Tiflis". In Houtsma, M. Th.; van Donzel, E. (eds.). E.J. Brill's First Encyclopaedia of Islam, 1913-1936. Brill. ISBN 90-04-08265-4.
- Rayfield, Donald (2012). Edge of Empires. Reaktion Books.
