= Mamia I Dadiani =

Duke of Mingrelia
- Reign: 1423–1455
- Predecessor: George I Dadiani
- Successor: George II Dadiani
- Died: 1454
- Issue: George II Dadiani
- House: Dadiani
- Father: George I Dadiani
- Religion: Georgian Orthodox Church

Mamia I Dadiani (Georgian: მამია I დადიანი; died 1345) was a member of the House of Dadiani and eristavi ("duke") of Odishi in western Georgia from 1323 until his death.

Mamia succeeded as duke of Odishi, latter-day Mingrelia, on the death of his father, George I Dadiani, in 1323. This was the time when a civil war was raging in the Kingdom of Imereti, of which Odishi was part, between King Constantine I and his brother Michael. According to the early-18th-century historian Prince Vakhushti of Kartli, this situation was exploited by George I Dadiani to assert the Dadiani's autonomy, which was further consolidated by Mamia I. By that time, he held sway not only over Odishi proper; his influence extended south into Guria and north into Abkhazia. In 1330, however, Imereti and its vassal principalities were reintegrated by the resurgent King of Georgia, George V "the Brilliant", to whom Dadiani offered his submission. Mamia died in 1345 and his son, George II Dadiani was confirmed by the king of Georgia as his successor.

Mamia I Dadiani House of Dadiani Born: ? Died: 1345
Regnal titles
Preceded by George I Dadiani	Duke of Mingrelia; 1323–1345	Succeeded by George II Dadiani
