= Xanəgah, Julfa =

Village and municipality in Nakhchivan, Azerbaijan

Khanagah
- Municipality
- Azerbaijani: Xanəgah
- Location within Azerbaijan
- Coordinates: 39°11′24″N 45°42′23″E
- Country: Azerbaijan
- Autonomous republic: Nakhchivan
- District: Julfa

Population (2005)
  - Total: 1,212
- Time zone: UTC+4 (AZT)

Xanəgah (also, Khanagah and Khanegakh) is a village and municipality in the Julfa District of Nakhchivan, Azerbaijan. It is located 37 km in the north from the district center, on both banks of the Alinja River, on the slope of the Zangezur ridge. Its population is busy with vine-growing, farming and animal husbandry. There are secondary school, cultural house, three libraries, communication branch, club, kindergarten and a medical center in the village. It has a population of 1,212. The Əlincəçay xanəgahı (Alinja architectural complex) of the Middle Ages is located in the east from the Khanagah village, on the left bank of the Alinja River.

== Etymology ==
The name of the Xanəgah (Khanagah) is related with common name of Khanagah which were given to the sanctuary, sacred place and the buildings built around the holy graves or to the buildings owned by the pilgrims. The Khanagah means "place for dervishes", and were built on the sacred places. The tombs of the Sheikh Khorasan (Fazlullah Naimi) in the Julfa region, the Khoja Sayyid in the Lerik regions are such a Khanagahs.

== Historical and archaeological monuments ==
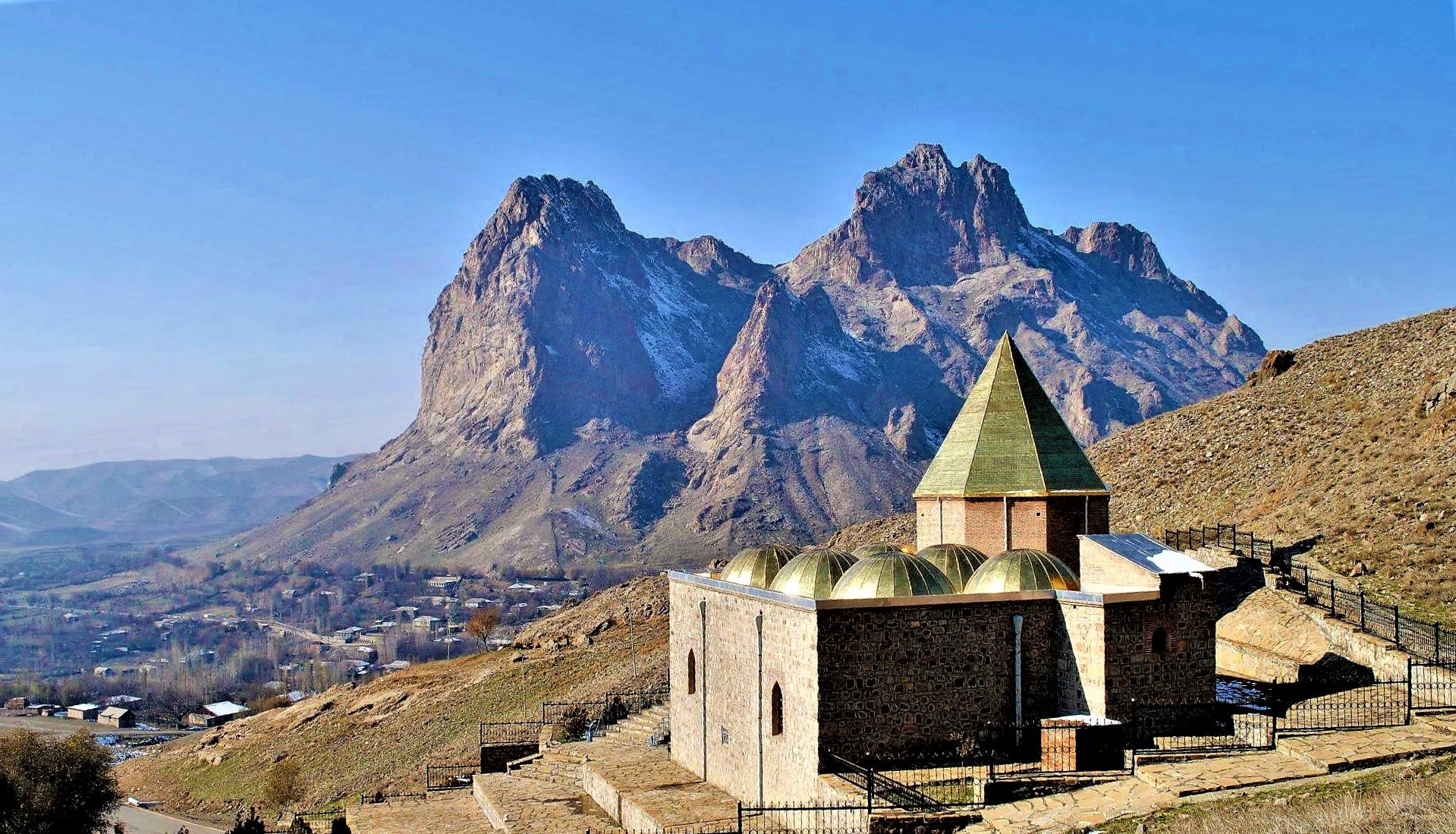
Alinja architectural complex of the 13th–15th centuries

=== Alinja architectural complex ===
Əlincəçay Xanəgahı (The Khanagah of Alinja) - the architectural complex of the Middle Ages in the Khanagah village of Julfa rayon, on the bank of the Alinja River. From the complex until the present days preserved the tomb, mosque pillars of the unknown monument and the ruins of another building. The basis of the Alinja khanagah complex consists from the square tomb which was built by a person named Lalabey. On the inscription of the tomb, has been left name of the architect (Jamaleddin), but the part which was the date of building, was destroyed. However, in the "Communist" newspaper, dated 24 August 1975, shows that the Alinja khanagah exist since the 8th century. The Tromp (the cone part at the architecture, arch-shaped construction) girdle on the upper corners of the tomb in a large-size, gives an archaic look to its interior. The tromps is eight-pointed. Stalakit (decorative detail in the form of figure of the prism-shaped in the architecture) installation is passing to a sixteen-angled that this make up the seat of the tent-shaped dome. Dome of the tomb was destroyed. The rectangular boards which conditionally called "alter" on both sides of the entrance of the khanageh, are decorated with vividly ornaments and inscriptions of religious content. These are the most beautiful examples of plastic carving on the gypsum. The architectural elements of the tomb's entrance arch are similar to the details of the Mömünə Xatun (Momine Khatun Mausoleum) mausoleum. In its construction beside the brick, were also used the turquoise glazed tile. The mosque which was built adjacent to the tomb's arch, divided into six sections with the two supporting and each section is covered with a dome. In the inscription of the mosque, is shown that it was built in 901 AH (1496), by the order of an unknown woman. In 2005, thorough reconstruction and restoration works were carried out.

=== Khanagah I ===
Khanagah I - the place of the residence of the Middle Ages in the west of the village of Khanagah in the Julfa district, on the right bank of the Alinja River. The remains of the building and edifice were discovered. Surface materials consists of fragments of glazed and unglazed clay pots. The surface of the unglazed pots (pitcher, jug, pot, aftafa-type containers) were coated with a layer of transparent coating, from the outside is decorated with carved geometric lines. The glazed containers (cup, plate, etc.) in a generally, from the inside were decorated with rich geometric and floral depictions. According to the findings, it is supposed that the Khanagah settlement belongs to the 13th-18th centuries.

=== Khanagah II ===
Khanegah II - the place of residence of the Middle Ages in the north-east of the village of Khanagah in the Julfa rayon, on the left bank of the Alinja River. It is in the valley surrounded by mountains on all sides. Was recorded in 1969. Its area is 6 hectares. At the place of residence which was completely destroyed, remained the oval or rectangular pits. The surface materials consist of the remains of buildings, the fragments of clay pot in the pink colored. In 1991, during the exploration research works from the west side on the hill, was identified the cultural layer. The area was destroyed as a result of erosion. From here are collected ashes, bones, fragments of pottery etc. The Alinja architectural complex is located in the center of the place of residence. The monument belongs to the 11th-18th centuries.

=== Khanagah Necropolis ===
Khanagah Necropolis - the archaeological monument of the Middle Ages in the north-east of the village of Khanagah in the Julfa rayon. The Necropolis currently is divided into two parts with the stone wall which was built around the Alinja architectural complex. The graves are almost destroyed; the majority of them differs for its gravestones (some of them are inscriptions in Arabic). In the past, on several of the graves from the specific type of marble of the onyx - were masterfully made a chest stone for the graves; it is kept at the Nakhchivan State History Museum. There were found the samples of material culture which is typical for the Middle Ages. The Khabagah necropolis belongs to the 12th-16th centuries.

=== St. Gevorg Monastery ===
St. Gevorg Monastery was a 9th-century ruinous Armenian monastery located near the village of Xanəgah, approximately 3 km northeast of Yernjak (Alinja) fortress. The ruins of the monastery were razed and eradicated at some point between October 7, 2001, and November 11, 2009.
