= Sophia Amirajibi =

Princess Sophia Amirajibi (Georgian: სოფიო ამირაჯიბი, Sop'io Amirajibi; Russian: Софья Васильевна Амираджиби, Sofia Vasilyevna Amiradzhibi) née Argutinskaya-Dolgorukaya (Аргутинская-Долгорукая) (October 1, 1847, Tbilisi – June 14, 1906, Moscow) was one of the best translators of Georgian poetry into Russian, and the founder of the first children's library in Tbilisi.

She was born of the Armeno–Georgian noble family of Argutinsky-Dolgorukov and married to a Georgian nobleman, Lieutenant-General Mikhail Amirajibi. Her translations of Ilia Chavchavadze, Akaki Tsereteli, Vakhtang Orbeliani and many others, noted for their quality and closeness to the originals, were regularly published in the Russian-language press of Tbilisi. Most of her translations were published in a separate volume by Alexander Khakhanov in Moscow in 1909.

== See also ==
- Amirejibi
