= Nabakhtevi Virgin Mary Church =

Historic church in country of Georgia

- ნაბახტევის ღვთისმშობლის ეკლესია
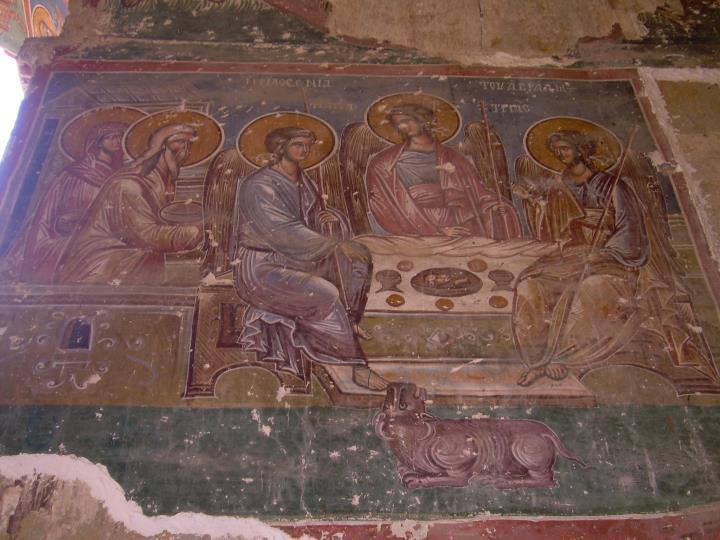
- Nabakhtevi

- Location within Shida Kartli Location within Georgia

Religion
- Affiliation: Georgian Orthodox Church
- District: Khashuri Municipality
- Region: Caucasus
- Status: Active

Location
- Location: Nabakhtevi, Khashuri Municipality, Georgia
- Coordinates: 42°03′39″N 43°39′58″E

Architecture
- Style: Georgian; Church
- Completed: 15th century

Nabakhtevi Virgin Mary Church (Georgian: ნაბახტევის ღვთისმშობლის ეკლესია) is a church in Georgia, in village Nabakhtevi, Khashuri municipality.

== History ==
This 15th century monument in Nabakhtevi was built by the order of Kutsna Amirejibi in Cheratkhevi ravine.

The hall church and bell tower are included in Nabakhtevi Virgin Mary church complex. The hall church (14.5 × 9.35) is built by grey hewn stones. The church has two entrances – from the west (brick) and from the north. There are two semicircular riches and a window in a semicircular apse. There is the representation of Virgin - the fresco Holy Virgin in Paradise, who sits on the throne with saints.

Church wall-painting was done in 1412–1431, stylistically it belongs to the wider circle of the Byzantine art. Some compositions are relocated at the Art Museum of Georgia. The painting on the separating wall of the hall and after is with three registers: the argus – eye represented in the top register, Abraham's hospitability in the second, and church fathers and Svimeon Mesvete in the third.

In 2006, Nabakhtevi Virgin Mary church was indicated as a National Cultural Monuments of Georgia.

== Literature ==
- Lortkipanidze I., Nabaxtevi paintings, Tbilisi, 1973
