= Amirejibi =

Georgian family

Coat of arms of Princes Amirejibi

The House of Amirejibi (Georgian: ამირეჯიბი) is a Georgian family, formerly a prominent noble house, which branched off the House of Palavandishvili and rose in prominence in the late 14th century. The family name comes from a Georgian courtier title of amirejibi (derived from Arabic: amir, أمير + hajib, الحاجب) that was hereditary in one of the Palavandishvili lines and roughly corresponded to the office of Lord Great Chamberlain.

== History ==
The Amirejibi were in the immediate circles of the ruling Bagrationi dynasty. For example, King Constantine I of Georgia (r. 1407–1412) married Natia, daughter of Kutsna Amirejibi, sometime ambassador to Constantinople. After the Collapse of the Georgian realm into three independent kingdoms (Kartli, Kakheti, and Imereti), the family was confirmed in princely dignity by King Luarsab II in 1613. After the Russian annexation of Georgia, the family was enlisted among the Russian noble houses as Princes Amiredzhibi (Амирэджиби) or Amiredzhibov (Амиреджибов) by the Tsar’s decree of February 2, 1824.

== See also ==
- Chabua Amirejibi, Georgian novelist and Soviet-era dissident
- Sophia Amirajibi, Georgian translator of poetry
- Tengiz Amirejibi, Georgian pianist
