= George II Dadiani =

Eristavi (duke) of Odishi in Georgia

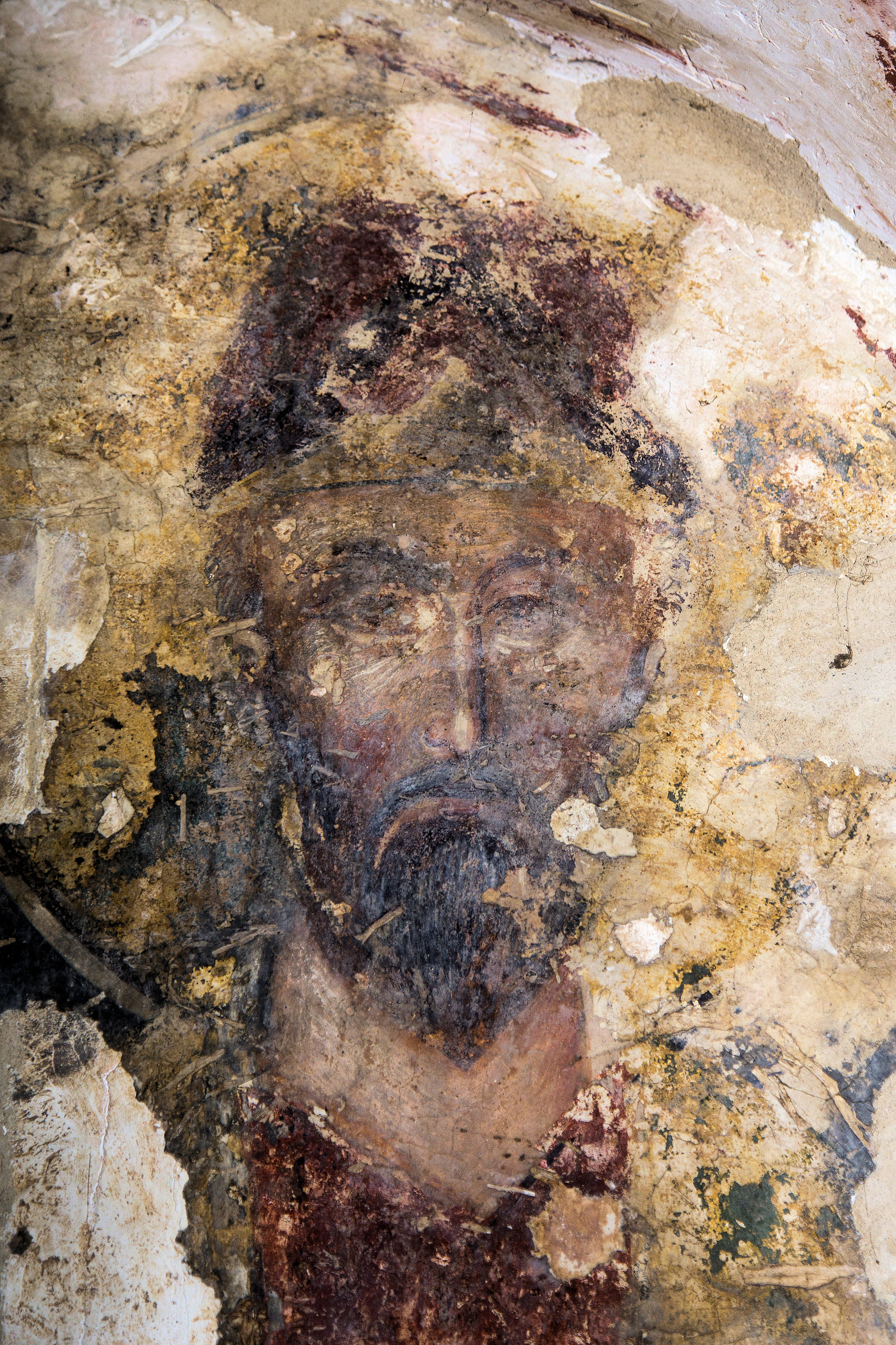

Giorgi II Dadiani (Georgian: გიორგი II დადიანი; died 1384) was a member of the House of Dadiani and eristavi ("duke") of Odishi in western Georgia from 1345 until his death.

Giorgi II succeeded on the death of his father, Mamia I Dadiani, in 1384, as duke of Odishi, latter-day Mingrelia. He was confirmed by King George V of Georgia. Beyond Odishi proper, Giorgi held sway over Guria and Svanetia. He, further, had the rank of mandaturt-ukhutsesi ("Lord High Steward") of Georgia. Giorgi and his wife, Marikhi, are depicted in a fresco in the northern wall of the Bedia Cathedral, in his possessions in Abkhazia, which he had renovated. He also made contributions to the Monastery of the Cross in Jerusalem. Giorgi died in 1384. He is buried in his family's burial ground in the Khobi Cathedral.

Giorgi had a wife, Rusudan, and two sons, of whom Vameq I succeeded him in Odishi; the other, Kakhaber, was appanaged with Guria with the title of Gurieli.

George II Dadiani House of Dadiani Born: ? Died: 1384
Regnal titles
Preceded by Mamia I Dadiani	Duke of Mingrelia; 1345–1384	Succeeded by Vameq I Dadiani
