= Bagrat (son of Constantine I of Georgia) =

Bagrat (Georgian: ბაგრატი) was a Georgian royal prince (batonishvili) of the Bagrationi dynasty.

Son of King Constantine I of Georgia.

Bagrat whose revolt against his reigning brother Alexander I of Georgia is recorded in the 18th-century continuation of the Georgian chronicles, but unattested elsewhere. According to the 20th-century historian Cyril Toumanoff, Bagrat had a daughter Tamar, also known as Nestan-Darejan, who married, in 1445, her cousin, George, co-king of Kakheti and subsequently king of Georgia (as George VIII) and then of Kakheti (as George I). She is last mentioned in 1510.
