= Constantine I of Georgia =

King of Georgia from 1407 to 1411

Constantine I
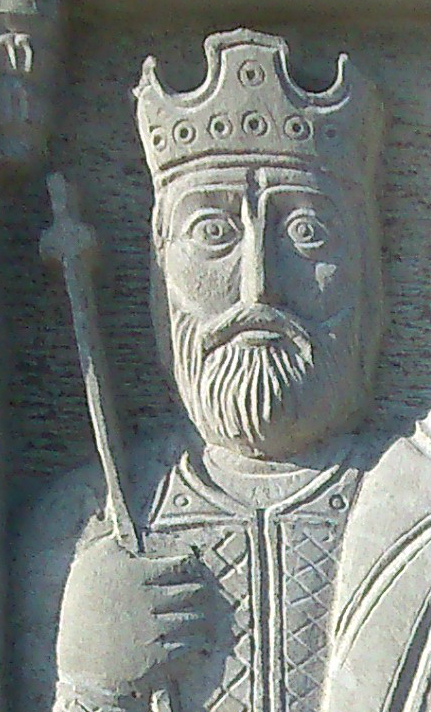

King of Georgia
- Reign: 1407–1412
- Predecessor: George VII
- Successor: Alexander I
- Died: 1412
- Spouse: Natia Amirejibi
- Issue: Alexander I of Georgia; Prince Bagrat; Prince George
- Dynasty: Bagrationi
- Father: Bagrat V of Georgia
- Mother: Anna of Trebizond
- Religion: Georgian Orthodox Church
- Khelrtva

Constantine I (Georgian: კონსტანტინე I, romanized: k'onst'ant'ine I; died 1412) was king (mepe) of Georgia from 1407 (or 1405) until his death in 1412. He is the common ancestor of all surviving branches of the Bagrationi dynasty.

== Early life ==
Constantine was the son of King Bagrat V of Georgia by his second wife, Anna of Trebizond. His paternal grandparents were David IX of Georgia and Princess Sindukhtar Jaqeli. His maternal grandparents were Alexios III of Trebizond and Theodora Kantakouzene.

In 1400, Constantine was sent as an ambassador to the Turco-Mongol warlord Timur who continued a relentless and devastating war against the Georgians. Afterwards, he vainly demanded from his reigning half-brother George VII to make peace with Timur. In 1402, Constantine together with the prince Ivane I Jaqeli of Samtskhe submitted to Timur but never took part in the war against Georgia.

== Reign ==
He succeeded on the death of George VII as king in 1407 and launched a program of restoration of what had been ruined and destroyed during Timur's invasions.

Towards 1411, he allied with the Shirvanshah Ibrahim I and the ruler of Shaki Sidi Ahmed to counter the Qara Qoyunlu Turkoman advance into the Caucasus. In the decisive Battle of Chalagan, the allies were routed and Constantine, his half-brother David and the Shirvanshah Ibrahim were taken prisoner.

In the captivity, he behaved arrogantly and the infuriated Turkoman prince Qara Yusuf ordered him, David, and 300 Georgian nobles to be executed. Qara Yusuf put Constantine to death by his own hand.

== Family ==
Constantine was married to Princess Natia Amirejibi, daughter of Kutsna, Prince-Chamberlain (Amirejibi) of Georgia. Limited information is available about Natia's family, which may have been from the house of Khurtsidze in Samtskhe or the Gabelisdze, purported ancestors of the Amirejibi family, in Shida Kartli. Kutsna himself served as an ambassador in Constantinople around 1386.

Constantine had three sons: Alexander, Bagrat, and George. All three were appointed as co-kings by their father between 1405 and 1408.

- Alexander I of Georgia (1390–1446), succeeded his father as the king of Georgia and reigned until his abdication from the throne in 1442;
- Prince Bagrat;
- Prince George, father of Bagrat VI, founder of the second Bagrationi dynasty of Imereti.

== Ancestry ==
Ancestors of Constantine I of Georgia

16. Demetre II of Georgia
8. George V of Georgia
17. Natela Jaqeli
4. David IX of Georgia
2. Bagrat V of Georgia
20. Beka I Jaqeli, Prince of Samtskhe-Saatabago
10. Qvarqvare I Jaqeli, Prince of Samtskhe-Saatabago
5. Sindukhtar Jaqeli
1. Constantine I of Georgia
24. Alexios II Megas Komnenos
12. Basil Megas Komnenos
25. Djiadjak Jaqeli
6. Alexios III Megas Komnenos
13. Irene of Trebizond
3. Anna Megale Komnene
28. A brother of Michael Kantakouzenos
14. Nikephoros Kantakouzenos
7. Theodora Kantakouzene

Preceded by George VII	King of Georgia; 1407–1412	Succeeded by Alexander I
