= Bagrat V of Georgia =

King of Georgia from 1360 to 1393

Bagrat V
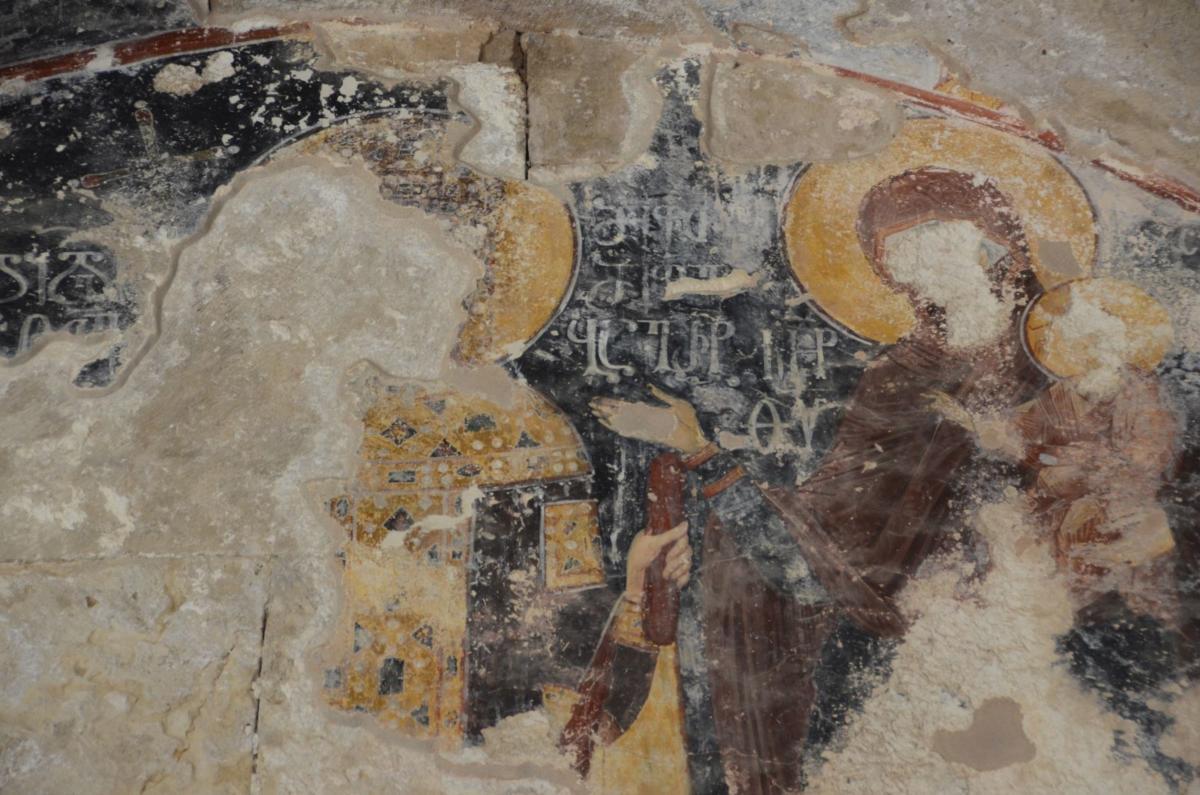
- Fresco of Bagrat V of Georgia from the Gelati Monastery.

King of Georgia
- Reign: 1360–1393
- Coronation: 1355 as co-king
- Predecessor: David IX
- Successor: George VII
- Co-king: George VII (1369–1393)
- Died: 1393
- Burial: Gelati Monastery
- Spouse: Helen (died 1366) Anna of Trebizond (m. 1367)
- Issue: George VII of Georgia; Constantine I of Georgia; Princess Olympias; Prince David
- Dynasty: Bagrationi
- Father: David IX
- Mother: Sindukhtar Jaqeli
- Religion: Georgian Orthodox Church

Bagrat V the Great (Georgian: ბაგრატ V დიდი, romanized: bagrat' V didi; died 1393) of the Bagrationi dynasty, was co-king from 1355 and became king (mepe) of the Kingdom of Georgia from 1360 until his death in 1393.

== Biography ==
=== Accession to the throne ===
Bagrat V was the only son of King David IX of Georgia (r. 1346–1360) and Queen Sindukhtar Jaqeli of the House of Jaqeli. Born on an unknown date, Bagrat was probably associated with the throne as a co-king in 1355. His father, however, died five years later at Geguti, whereupon Bagrat succeeded him as king. He was crowned in 1360 at Kutaisi by Catholicos-Patriarch Shio I, assuming the title of the 21st "King of the Abkhazians, the Kartvelians, the Kakhetians, the Rans and the Armenians, Shirvanshah and Shahanshah". The ceremony was attended by prominent members of the Church and the nobility.

The Greek historian Michael Panaretos, who personally knew Bagrat V, described him as an "outstanding military commander". Armenian sources also referred to Bagrat V as "victorious and mighty".

The Georgian historian Vakhushti Bagrationi described Bagrat as a Christian who "honoured those consecrated to God". He portrayed him as a peaceful and merciful ruler who nevertheless showed no fear when confronted with an attack. Physically, the king was described as robust, energetic, and handsome, possessing the qualities of a warrior who pursued his objectives with determination.

Upon his accession, Bagrat V's kingdom encompassed much of the Caucasus, extending from Nikopsia in the northwest to the province of Shaki in the southeast. Georgia's southern borders included the Makriali Pass, bordering the Empire of Trebizond and the territories of the Chupanids, while Shirvan formed the kingdom's southeastern frontier.

=== Early years ===
Bagrat V soon faced his first challenges as king. In 1362, the same year as a solar eclipse, the highland Svans rose in rebellion against royal authority and ravaged western Georgia, advancing as far as Kutaisi, the kingdom's second-largest city, which they set on fire. In response, Bagrat ordered his vassal, the duke of Racha, to march against the rebels, accompanied by troops from Kakheti and Hereti. The Dadiani duke of Mingrelia, supported by the princes of Guria, Abkhazia, and northern Armenia, subsequently came to the aid of the Rachan forces and reinforced their position at Etseri. Bagrat then personally led a coalition of troops from Lechkhumi, Meskheti, Klarjeti, Imereti, and Kartli into Svaneti. He defeated the rebels and suppressed the uprising, once again forcing the Svans to acknowledge the authority of the royal government in Tbilisi. He also imprisoned the local eristavi and appointed a member of the House of Gelovani as governor of the region.

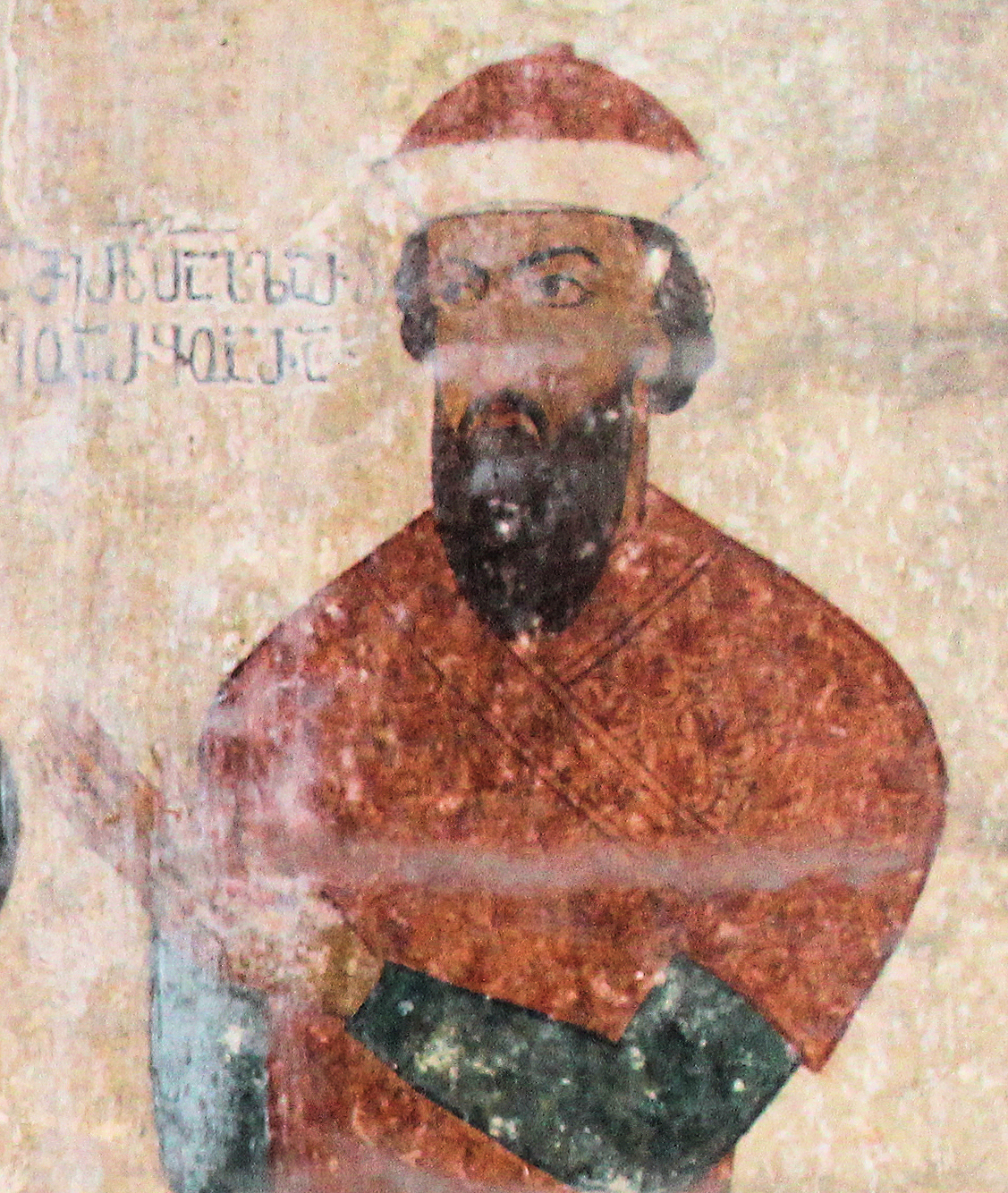
Qvarqvare I Jaqeli, who ruled Samtskhe during the reign of Bagrat V

Shortly after this internal conflict, Bagrat V faced his first external military threat when Turkish forces from the Jalayirid Sultanate invaded Samtskhe. The Georgian king responded by crossing the Persat with 12,000 men and reaching the Aras River three days and nights later. He then surprised the retreating Turks, whose understanding of the Georgian army's position had been distorted by misleading information from their prisoners, and engaged them in a fierce battle that ended in a heavy defeat for the Jalayirid forces. Bagrat V returned to Samtskhe with booty and prisoners before turning his attention to the affairs of the kingdom. Around this time, Qvarqvare I, duke of Samtskhe, died, and Bagrat confirmed the deceased duke's son, Beka II, as his successor. The king subsequently returned to Tbilisi.

These victories were soon overshadowed by the recurrence of an epidemic of bubonic plague around 1365. An "innumerable" number of people perished, including Queen Helen in 1366. Bagrat V survived the epidemic, which subsided within a few years, and subsequently devoted himself to restoring the kingdom's economy, which had been severely damaged by the outbreak. During this period, he also lost control of the extensive border province of Shaki, which became an independent Turkish emirate under Sidi Ahmed Orlat.

During the nearly fourteen years of peace that followed, Georgia experienced cultural, economic, and political development. Bagrat V partly compensated for the loss of Shaki by reducing the neighbouring Muslim states of Arran, Mughan, and Dvin to tributary status. Internally, Bagrat strengthened royal authority and consolidated his control over his vassals. In 1372, he appointed Alexander I of Imereti as duke of Imereti. In 1384, following the death of George II Dadiani, he confirmed Vameq I Dadiani as his successor as duke of Odishi. In 1373, Bagrat again confronted Turkish forces when they invaded Javakheti. They were defeated in a battle at Alastani, during which the duke of Ksani and Prince George of Alastani were killed.

Throughout much of Bagrat V's reign, the Kingdom of Georgia maintained cordial relations with the Golden Horde.

=== International relations ===
Georgia during the reign of Bagrat V

During Bagrat V's reign, Georgia did not enjoy the same international prestige that it had possessed under George V (r. 1314–1346). The kingdom was surrounded by Muslim states hostile to the Christian monarchy, including Shirvan, Arran, the Chupanid states and Turkish territories bordering Georgia to the southwest. The Empire of Trebizond was the principal diplomatic link between Georgia and the Byzantine and Western worlds. Accordingly, Bagrat maintained close relations with Trebizond, an empire that had previously been a Georgian protectorate. His first wife, Helen, was a Trapezuntine princess and an illegitimate daughter of the late Emperor Basil I (r. 1332–1340), while his second wife, Anna, was the eldest daughter of Alexios III Komnenos (r. 1349–1390). Bagrat V was held in high regard in the Empire of Trebizond, as reflected in the account of the Greek chronicler Michael Panaretos, who described him as an "outstanding military commander".

In addition to Trebizond, Bagrat V maintained diplomatic relations with the Catholic world, then headed by Pope Gregory XI. In 1370, the king received a delegation consisting of the Archbishop of Thessaloniki and 25 Franciscan missionaries. Several more Franciscans arrived in 1373 and subsequently established two monasteries in 1382, in Tbilisi and Akhaltsikhe. These activities formed part of an effort to extend Rome's influence in the East, particularly in the Caucasus. Bagrat V used these efforts to establish closer ties with Western Europe, partly with the aim of promoting economic cooperation.

In the Caucasus, Bagrat's Georgia continued to occupy a dominant position. Almost all of Transcaucasia was incorporated into the Georgian kingdom, with the exception of Shirvan and Arran. Bagrat was also held in high regard by the Armenian community, which described him as a "victorious and mighty" monarch. Most of the mountainous regions of the North Caucasus continued to acknowledge the formal supremacy of Tbilisi, extending Georgia's sphere of influence to the lands of the Lezgins.

=== Invasion of Timur ===
==== Battle of Tbilisi ====
Depiction of Georgian cavalry in a 14th-century Georgian manuscript

While the Kingdom of Georgia under Bagrat V sought to strengthen its internal position and restore its international influence, a new power emerged in the Middle East. Between 1363 and 1370, a young general named Timur began establishing an empire extending from Transoxiana to Khwarazm. An ambitious Muslim military leader, Timur sought to recreate the empire once established by his ancestor Genghis Khan. In the 1380s, he went to war against his former ally Tokhtamysh, the powerful khan of the Golden Horde, following Tokhtamysh's capture of Tabriz in 1385. It was in this context that Timur first appeared in Transcaucasia, seeking to establish a defensive buffer against the Golden Horde in the Caucasus. To this end, he captured Kars and Erzerum in 1386. Despite the strategic origins of his campaigns in Georgia, the Zafarnama, the official chronicle of Timur's reign, portrayed these operations as an effort to spread Islam within the Christian kingdom, presenting them as a jihad.

After brief but destructive raids in the eastern Caucasus, during which he ravaged the Georgian tributary province of Tabasaran, Timur and his army entered Georgia through the border city of Yerevan and devastated northern Armenia, which was then part of Georgia, despite the severe cold of early winter. Without a major battle, the atabeg of Samtskhe, Beka II Jaqeli, appeared before Timur and submitted to him, leaving Bagrat V without military support in the south. Determined to resist the invasion, the Georgian king remained in Tbilisi with his wife to prepare for the impending attack, while sending his eldest son and co-king, George, to Samtsverisi. As the Turco-Mongol forces approached, George subsequently moved to Imereti. Timur continued his advance northwards, devastating numerous villages and passing through settlements such as Partskhisi without encountering resistance. He also sought to spread "terror and dread" throughout Trialeti and Sabaratiano, taking numerous captives and ravaging settlements across these regions. Upon receiving news of the destruction of Georgia's rural districts, eristavi Virchel Churdiashvili, Bagrat V's chief general, took refuge in the fortress of Bekhouchi alongside Catholicos-Patriarch George V, regional priests, numerous displaced people, and a considerable number of horses and sheep.

The citadel of Tbilisi was rapidly reinforced in preparation for the siege. The capital's garrison consisted of soldiers drawn from various regions of the kingdom. Timur, however, first surrounded the city and cut off its access routes, preventing potential reinforcements from reaching the besieged king. Many prominent members of the Georgian nobility left the city and sought refuge on their estates, while the king's closest supporters remained by his side. Battering rams were subsequently positioned around the fortress, and Timur's troops prepared to launch their assault. On 21 November 1386, as winter conditions prevailed across the country, the walls of the royal citadel were breached and the invaders entered the capital. Having lost hope of receiving reinforcements, Bagrat V led his troops out to confront the Turco-Mongols. The Georgian Chronicles preserve part of his speech to the garrison before the battle:

To die for the faith of Christ is a fate more glorious and desirable than to submit and endure the rule of the conqueror.

The ensuing battle was fierce and resulted in heavy casualties on both sides, with Timur's forces reportedly suffering greater losses. The fighting did not end immediately, as the surviving Georgian defenders withdrew into Tbilisi, preventing Timur from capturing the city as quickly as he had intended. Georgian archers continued to inflict losses on the invading forces, who constructed chevaux de frise and armed themselves with clubs for protection. Nevertheless, Timur's troops eventually breached Tbilisi's fortifications and captured the city. They subsequently sacked it, setting fire to Christian religious buildings, killing many inhabitants and taking hundreds of captives. Bagrat V, accompanied by a small group of soldiers, continued fighting until he was captured with weapons in his hands. He was subsequently brought before Timur, together with Queen Anna and their son David.

==== Captivity and release ====
Following his capture, Timur demanded that Bagrat V convert to Islam. Bagrat initially refused, but eventually feigned acceptance in order to secure his release. Timur agreed to release Bagrat and sent him back to the Georgian kingdom, accompanied by 12,000 Timurid warriors, with the intention of converting the Georgians to Islam. However, once they had entered Georgian territory, Bagrat, accompanied by his sons, Prince George and Constantine, and Georgian forces, turned against the Timurid troops and killed them.

Believing that Bagrat V would not escape death this time, his vassal, the Imeretian prince Alexander, proclaimed himself an independent ruler and was crowned King of Imereti at Gelati Monastery in 1387. In the spring of 1388, Timur invaded the Georgian kingdom once again but failed to force the Georgians into submission. Bagrat V received assistance from his allies in the Golden Horde, who launched an invasion of Azerbaijan, as well as from the rebellion that had broken out in Persia. As a result, Timur was forced to retreat from Tbilisi. In 1389, following the death of King Alexander of Imereti, Bagrat V succeeded in restoring his suzerainty over Alexander's successor. Bagrat died in 1393, leaving the throne to his eldest son, George.

== Family ==
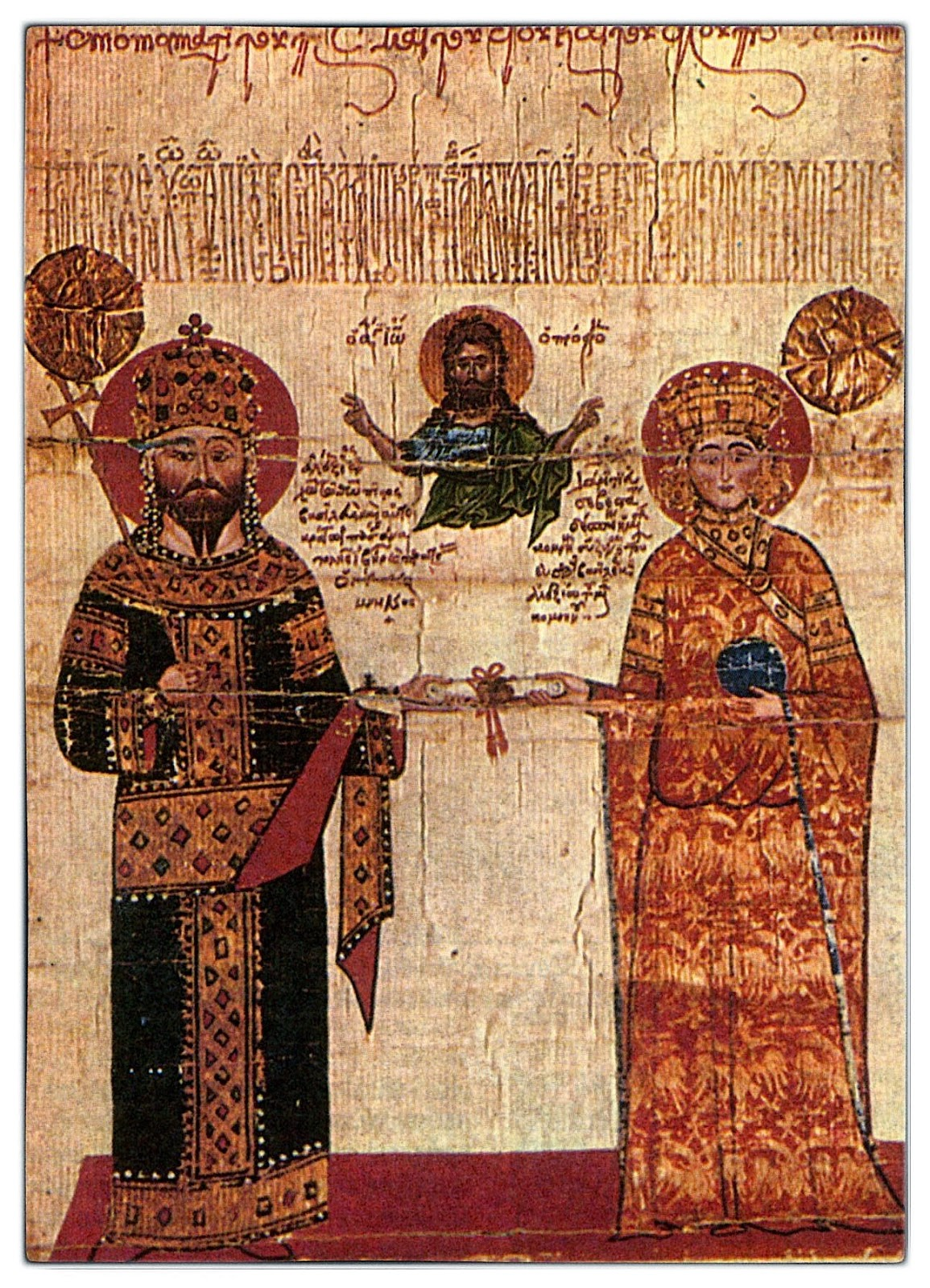
Emperor Alexios III of Trebizond and Theodora Kantakouzene, the parents of Anna of Trebizond

Bagrat V was first married to Queen Helen, who died of bubonic plague in 1366. Her origins are unknown, as historical sources provide no information about her parentage. In June 1367, following Helen's death, Bagrat married Anna Komnene, daughter of Alexios III of Trebizond, Emperor of Trebizond.

Bagrat V had four known children:

- George VII of Georgia (died 1407), King of Georgia (r. 1393–1407), was the eldest son of Bagrat V and his first wife, Helen.
- Constantine I of Georgia (died 1412), King of Georgia (r. 1407–1412). His mother's identity is not recorded in historical sources, although she is generally believed to have been Anna Komnene.
- Prince David, son of Anna Komnene, is mentioned in the historical account of Michael Panaretos.
- Princess Olympias (Ulumpia), daughter of Anna Komnene.

== Bibliography ==
- Lortkipanidze, Mariam; Metreveli, Roin, eds. (2007). Kings of Georgia. Tbilisi: Nekeri. ISBN 99928-58-36-2.
- Tavadze, Leri (2008). Georgia and Its Relationship with the Emirate of Erzincan during the Age of Bagrat V the Great.
- Jamaluddin, Syed (1995). The State Under Timur: A Study in Empire Building. Har-Anand. ISBN 8124102589.
- Baumer, Christoph (2023). History of the Caucasus. Bloomsbury Publishing. ISBN 9780755636303.
- Rayfield, Donald (2012). Edge of Empires : A History of Georgia. Reaktion Books.
- Rayfield, Donald (2017). Georgia. Crossroads of Empires. A history of three thousand years (in Russian). Moscow: ABC-Atticus. ISBN 978-5-389-12944-3.
- Toumanoff, Cyril (1949–1951). "The Fifteenth-Century Bagratids and the Institution of Collegial Sovereignty in Georgia". Traditio. 7. Cambridge University Press: 169–221. JSTOR 27830207.

Preceded by David IX	King of Georgia; 1360–1393	Succeeded by George VII
