= George VII of Georgia =

King of Georgia from 1393 to 1407

George VII
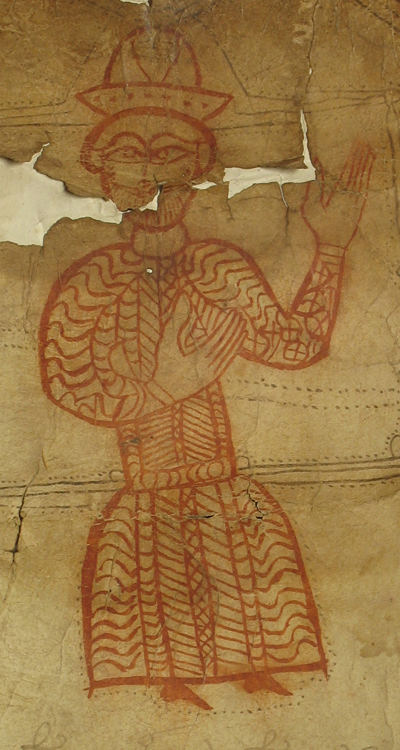
- George VII from 1393-1400 royal charter

King of Georgia
- Reign: 1393–1407
- Coronation: 1369 as co-king
- Predecessor: Bagrat V
- Successor: Constantine I
- Died: 1407
- Burial: Svetitskhoveli Cathedral
- Spouse: Nestan-Darejan
- Dynasty: Bagrationi
- Father: Bagrat V of Georgia
- Mother: Helen
- Religion: Georgian Orthodox Church
- Khelrtva

George VII (Georgian: გიორგი VII, romanized: giorgi VII; died 1407) of the Bagrationi dynasty, was king (mepe) of the Kingdom of Georgia from 1393 until his death in 1407 (alternatively, from 1395 to 1405).

== Early life and Co-King ==
George was born in the 1360s as the eldest son of Bagrat V of Georgia and his first wife, Helen, who died of the Bubonic plague in 1366. Following her death, Bagrat married Anna of Trebizond, daughter of Alexios III of Trebizond.

George was appointed co-king alongside his father in 1369, a move possibly motivated by the birth of his half-brother Constantine to Queen Anna. This arrangement may have been intended to safeguard George’s succession rights against potential claims from a younger sibling of higher maternal lineage.

In 1386, Timur besieged Tbilisi, where the nobles abandoned Bagrat V and withdrew to their fortresses. Tbilisi fell on 22 November 1386, its inhabitants were massacred, and Bagrat was captured. During his father’s captivity, George was offered the crown but refused, fearing for Bagrat’s life. To regain his freedom, Bagrat pretended to convert to Islam, and Timur sent him back with a force of 12,000 men to enforce the conversion of Georgia. Warned in advance, George and his brother Constantine ambushed Timur’s army in a mountain gorge, freed their father, and returned to Tbilisi.

In 1392, George I of Imereti was killed during a campaign against Vameq I Dadiani. This event allowed Prince George to ally with the major feudal lords of western Georgia and launch an invasion of the rebellious territories. As a result, the Kingdom of Western Georgia was reannexed into the Kingdom of Georgia, while surviving members of the insurgent family sought refuge in the Caucasus Mountains.

== Reign ==
Kingdom of Georgia at the start of reign of George VII

In 1393, Bagrat died and George assumed full royal powers. He spent most of his reign fighting Timur who led seven more expeditions against the stubborn Georgian kingdom from 1387 to 1403, leaving the country in ruins.

In 1396, Constantine who had been exiled to the North Caucasus took advantage of the Timurid invasions of Georgia and the death of Vameq I Dadiani, he returned to Imereti and organized a new rebellion. Without much resistance, the new rebel captured numerous fortresses and had himself crowned Constantine II of Imereti, but failed to unite with the region's great feudal lords. After demanding the vassalization of the dukes of Svaneti, Mingrelia and Guria, but he was killed in 1401. As Constantine was childless, the crown of the Kingdom of Western Georgia was to be passed on to his young and weak nephew, Demetrius, George VII who took advantage of a temporary ceasefire with Timur to invade western Georgia and once again put an end to the separatist kingdom.

In 1399, George VII attacked the Timurid army besieging the castle of Alinja. The Georgian army cut it way through the besiegers temporarily freeing the Jalayirid Prince Tahir and some of those inside the castle, while the Timurid general Seif ad-Din fled. While the Georgian army was withdrawing from the castle, an army sent by Miran Shah under the command of Abu Bakr arrived and a battle broke out. As the Timurid army advanced the Georgians attacked, resulting in a Georgian victory.

This event prompted Timur to return in 1399. He captured Shaki and devastated the neighboring region of Hereti and Kakheti. In the spring of 1400, Timur moved back to destroy the Georgian state once and for all. He demanded that George should hand over the Jalayirid Tahir but George refused with explanation that this would be against the Caucasian traditions and met Timur at the Sagim River in Kvemo Kartli, but suffered a defeat. After the war, of those who survived the fighting and reprisals, many thousands died of hunger and disease, and 60,000 survivors were enslaved and carried away by Timur's troops.

In late 1401, Timur invaded the Georgia once again. George VII had to sue for peace, and sent his brother Constantine with the contributions. Timur made peace with George on condition that the King of Georgia supplied him troops during his campaign against Ottoman Empire and granted the Muslims special privileges. Once the Ottomans were defeated at the Battle of Ankara, Timur, back to Erzurum in 1402, decided to punish George VII for not having come to present his congratulations on his victory. Historians reported that 700 towns were destroyed and their inhabitants massacred by Timurid forces.

In the aftermath of Timur's death in February 1405 and the subsequent power struggles among his heirs, Timur's empire became fragmented as Miran Shah and his sons struggled over control of Persia. In the midst of this chaos, George, who had returned from Imereti, engaged in battles to regain lost territories. He managed to conquer Nakhchivan and Ganja while also causing destruction in places like Ani, Erzurum, and Tabriz. Despite commanding an army of merely 5,000 men, George succeeded in expanding Georgia's borders temporarily to their former extent.

According to Vakhushti of Kartli, he was killed in battle against the Turkoman nomads, apparently of the Qara Qoyunlu clan. Today, some historians consider this information of Vakhushti doubtful and claim that George VII died of natural causes.

George VII died childless, his brother Constantine I became the next king.

== See also ==
- Timurid invasions of Georgia

== Sources ==
- Baumer, Christoph (2023). History of the Caucasus. Bloomsbury Publishing. ISBN 9780755636303.
- Brosset, Marie-Félicité (1856). Histoire de la Géorgie depuis l'Antiquité jusqu'au XIXe siècle - IIe partie: Histoire moderne. Saint Petersburg Academy of Sciences.
- Javakhishvili, Ivane (1949). Histoire de la Géorgie. XIe – XVe siècles (in Georgian). Tbilisi: Publication d'État de la RSS de Géorgie..
- Minorsky, Vladimir (1930). Transcaucasica (in French). Librairie orientaliste Paul Geuthner.
- Rayfield, Donald (2012). Edge of Empires : A History of Georgia. Reaktion Books.
- Bedrosian, Robert (1997). "Armenian during the Seljuk and Mongol Periods". In Hovannisian, Richard G. (ed.). The Armenian People From Ancient to Modern Times. Vol. I: The Dynastic Periods: From Antiquity to the Fourteenth Century. St. Martin's Press.
- Toumanoff, Cyril (1949–1951). The Fifteenth-Century Bagratids and the Institution of Collegial Sovereignty in Georgia.

Preceded by Bagrat V	King of Georgia; 1393–1407	Succeeded by Constantine I
