= Timurid invasions of Georgia =

Turco-Mongol invasions of Georgia 1386–1403

- Part of the Timurid Wars, Tokhtamysh-Timur war
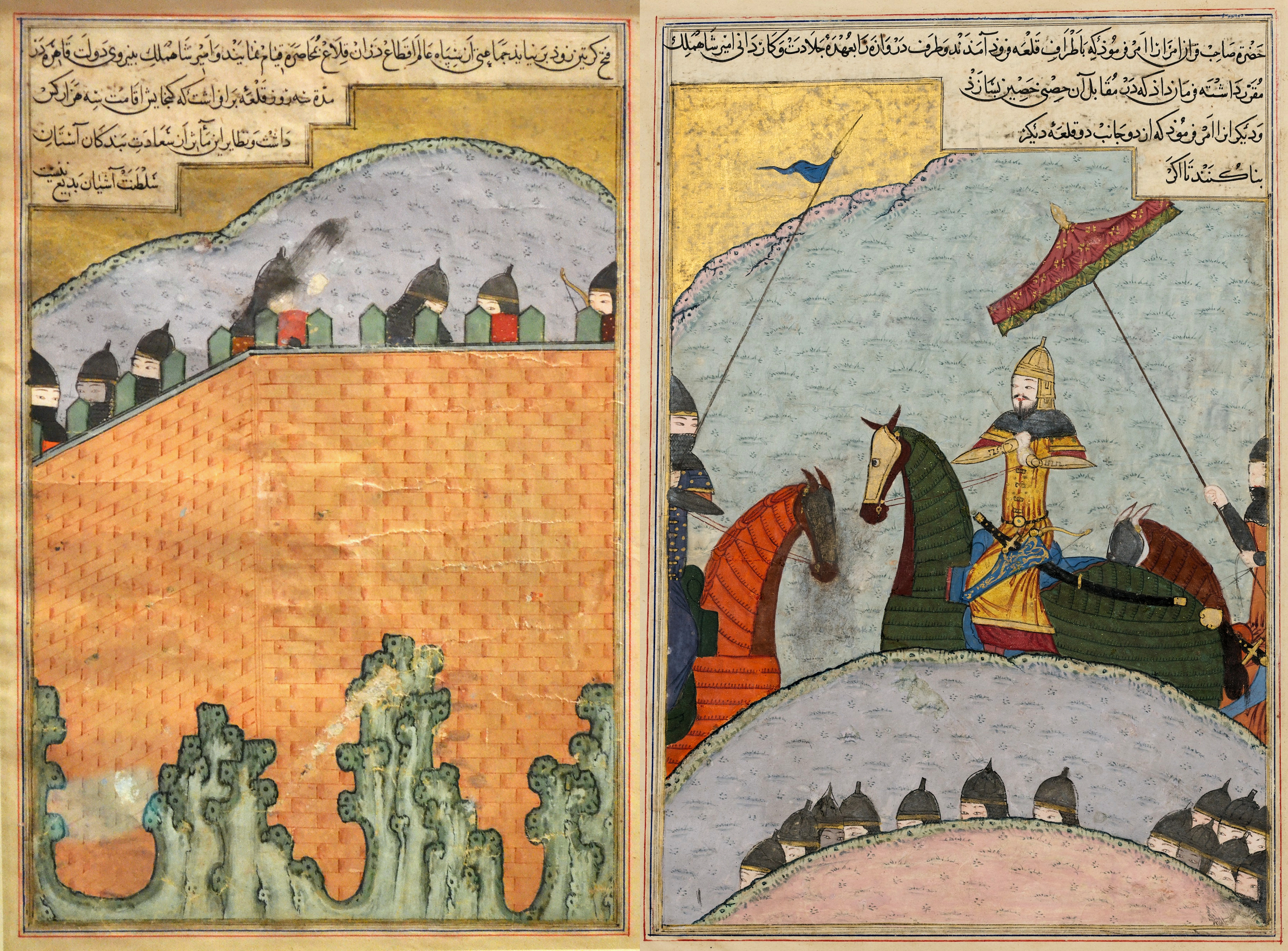
- Timur besieges the Gori Fortress on August 3rd, 1401. A miniature from the Zafarnama of Ibrahim Sultan.
| Date | 1386–1403 |
| Location | Caucasus, eastern Anatolia, western Iran |
| Result | Timurid victory |

Belligerents
| Timurid Empire | Kingdom of Georgia |

Commanders and leaders
| (Timurid Empire) Timur (Timurid Empire) Miran Shah | (Kingdom of Georgia) Bagrat V (POW) (Kingdom of Georgia) George VII (Kingdom of Georgia) Ivane II Jaqeli (until 1400) |

Strength
| 200,000 | 50,000 |

Casualties and losses
| Unknown | Most of Georgia destroyed and civilians massacred At least 60,000 enslaved |

Between 1386 and 1403, the Timurid Empire invaded the Kingdom of Georgia in the Caucasus eight times. Led by Timur, the Timurids ultimately defeated Georgia and made it a tributary state. However, Georgia, a Christian monarchy, was allowed to retain its independence and remain Christian.

== History ==
Timur's vast empire stretched, at its greatest extent, from Central Asia into Anatolia and these conflicts were intimately linked with the wars between Timur (Tamerlane) and Tokhtamysh, the last khan of the Golden Horde and Timur's major rival for control over the Islamic world. Although he was able to invade parts of Georgia, he was never able to make the country Muslim and even recognized Georgia as a Christian state.

In the first of eight invasions, Timur sacked Georgia's capital, Tbilisi, and captured the king Bagrat V in 1386. Georgian resistance prompted a renewed attack by the Turco-Mongol armies. Bagrat's son and successor, George VII, put up a stiff resistance and had to spend much of his reign (1395–1405) fighting the Timurid invasions. Timur personally led most of these raids to subdue the recalcitrant Georgian monarch. He was not able to establish a firm control over Georgia. By the time George VII was forced to accept Timur's terms of peace and agree to pay tribute, he was a master of little more than "gutted towns, ravaged countryside and a shattered monarchy."

=== First invasion ===
Timur's first appearance in the Caucasus was a response to Khan Tokhtamysh's marauding inroad into Northern Iran through the Caucasian lands in 1385. This marked an outbreak of outright hostility between the two Islamic monarchs. Timur responded by launching a full-scale invasion of the small frontier countries, which lay between the western border of his emerging empire and Tokhtamysh's khanate. After having overrun Azerbaijan and Kars, Timur marched into Georgia. The official history of his reign, Zafarnama, represents this campaign in Georgia as a jihad. Timur set out from Kars and assailed Samtskhe, the southernmost principality within the Kingdom of Georgia later in 1386. Tbilisi fell on 22 November 1386, its inhabitants were massacred and Bagrat fell into captivity. Timur's army spent the winter in Karabakh.

=== Liberation of Bagrat ===
To regain his freedom, Bagrat pretended to convert to Islam and Timur sent him back under surveillance of a 12,000-strong army which was to enforce Georgian Kingdom's conversion to Islam. Bagrat secretly informed his son George, who raised an army and destroyed the Timurid troops, freeing Bagrat.

=== Second invasion ===
The death of thousands of soldiers in battle with Georgian troops led to the start of Timur's new invasion of Georgia in the spring of 1387. The enemy's numbers significantly outnumbered the Georgian forces hastily assembled by the prince. Timur personally led the participants in the invasion. A huge number of the country's inhabitants fled to the mountains, thanks to which large casualties were avoided.

=== Third invasion ===
In 1392-1393 Timur raided and sacked the cities of Central Iran, then Baghdad, Syria, etc. In the spring of 1394, he came to southern Georgia and sent four commanders with an army of 40,000 to raid Samtskhe-Saatabago. Timur invaded and ravaged Samtskhe, Kors, Kola, and Akhaltsikhe. The population of the Georgian territories he occupied showed fierce resistance to the invaders, which is why the latter had to leave the region after the capture.

=== Fourth invasion ===
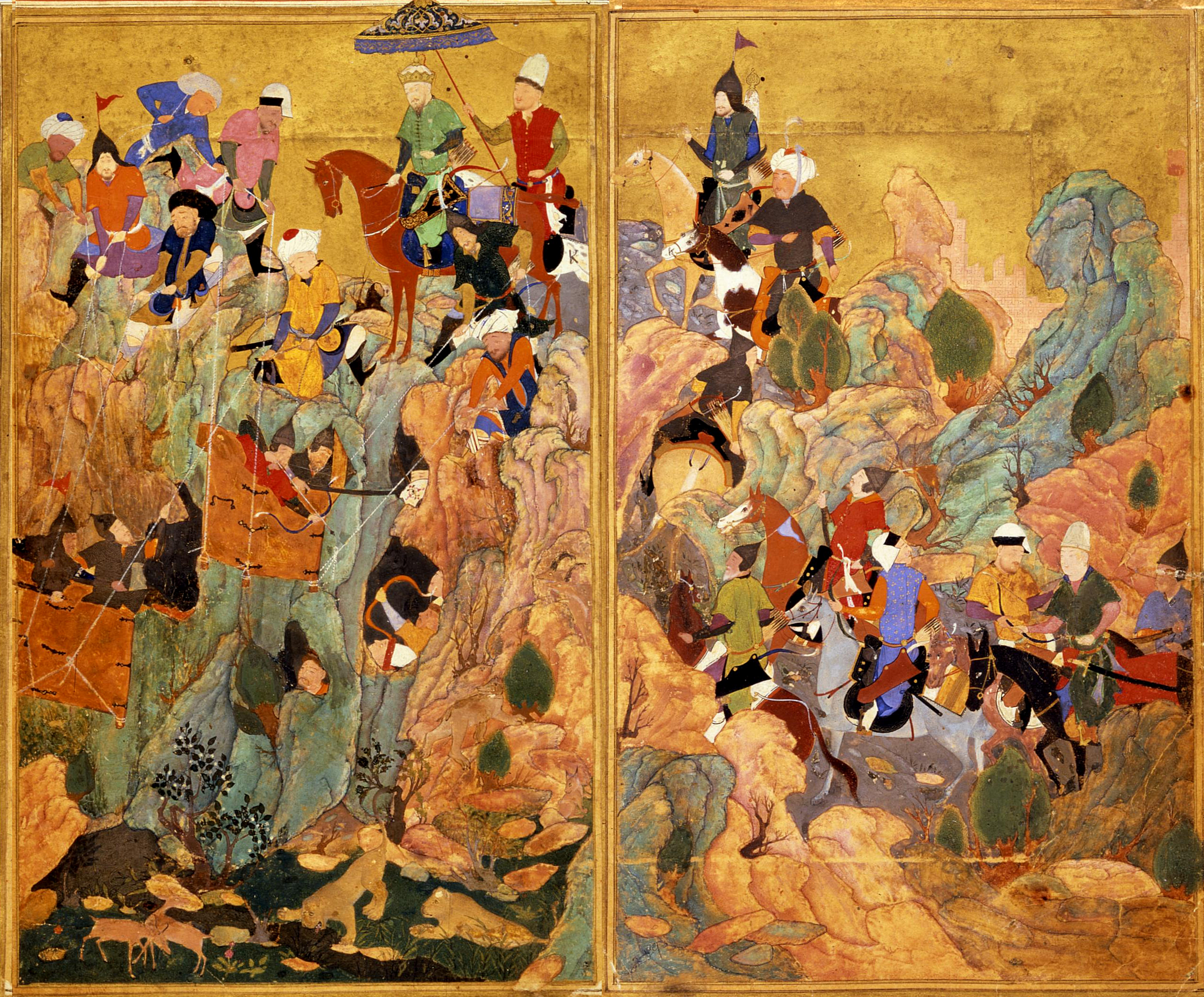
Elimination of the last survivors of the town of Nerges, Georgia, in the spring of 1396. Garrett Zafarnama, ca. 1480s

On September 13, 1394, Timur invaded with a large army from the Koli valley to the Aragvi valley via Trialeti and Kvemo Kartli. On the way, he destroyed everything, robbed and killed the inhabitants. Big battles took place in Aragvi valley. Timur's goal seems to have been to capture the Darial Pass in order to ultimately prevent the withdrawal of Georgian allied North Caucasian raiders and a possible Tokhtamysh invasion. Every time Timur appeared in Georgia, Tokhtamysh tried to invade Eastern Caucasus. It happened this time as well. Timur was unable to capture Darial due to the great resistance of the mountaineers. He was forced to come down from the mountain and go to Shaki through Tbilisi. At that time, Timur learned that Tokhtamysh would invade Shirvan through Derbent and ravage the place. Timur quickly moved in this direction, but avoided the battle and turned back again. His army encamped on the banks of the Mtkvari, near Mahmud Abad, and began preparations for a great campaign against Tokhtamish. It became clear to Timur that he could not subdue Caucasus, including Georgia, if he did not defeat Tokhtamysh.

=== Fifth invasion ===
In the winter of 1399, Timur breached the borders of Kingdom of Georgia with 100,000 specially chosen soldiers, under Timur, and Ibrahim I of Shirvan. They then crossed Kura river on a pontoon bridge, and hacked the path with machetes to avoid Georgian sentries. They caught Kakheti, and Hereti by surprise before they could flee, and hide their property. A Georgian general Khimisha delayed the Timurids by tactical evasion, and those who were forewarned escaped to the caves and forests. Timur's forces looted and burned churches and monasteries. They slaughtered civilians in their hiding places. Tens of thousands were pressed into slavery or were massacred.

=== Sixth invasion ===
In the spring of 1400, Timur moved back to destroy the Kingdom of Georgia once and for all. He demanded that George VII should hand over the Jalayirid Tahir but George VII refused and met Timur at the Sagim River in Kvemo Kartli, but suffered a defeat. After the war, of those who survived the fighting and reprisals, many thousands died of hunger and disease, and 60,000 survivors were enslaved and carried away by Timur's troops.

=== Seventh invasion ===
After the departure of Timur from Georgia, King George moved to Eastern Georgia and began to organize domestic affairs. King George and Virshel, Duke of Ksani raided and punished the Dvals, who took advantage of Timur's invasion and raided and looted the Ksani valley.

In 1401, Timur came to the borders of Georgia from the east and camped in Shamkor.

In late 1401, Timur invaded the Georgia once again. George VII had to sue for peace, and sent his brother with the contributions. Timur made peace with George VII on condition that the King of Georgia supplied him troops during his campaign against Ottoman Empire and granted the Muslims special privileges. In the spring, Timur's army left for the Ottomans. On the way, he came to the Tortumi fortress, in which about 200 Georgian soldiers were fortified, capture it and destroyed it after a five-day battle, and cut off the soldiers.

=== Eighth invasion ===
Once the Ottomans were defeated, Timur, back in Erzurum in 1402, decided to punish the king of Georgia for not having come to present his congratulations on his victory. George VII's brother, Constantine, who was then on bad terms with his brother, arrived with gifts, as did the king's defiant vassal Iwane Jaqeli, prince of Samtskhe. Sheikh Ibrahim I of Shirvan went to estimate the revenues and expenses of Georgia. George sent new presents but Timur refused them and summoned George to appear in person. In the meantime, he himself laid siege to the previously impregnable fortress of Birtvisi, defended by a tiny Georgian garrison. Having captured the fortress in August 1403, Timur sent his army to plunder and clear the frontier regions of Georgia and set out in pursuit of the retreating king George VII as far as Abkhazia. Timur's historian reports that 700 towns were destroyed and their inhabitants massacred.

Timur only stopped his army when the ulema and the mufti decided it was possible to grant the king of Georgia clemency (aman). George VII had to pay a huge tribute, including 1,000 tankas of gold struck in the name of Timur, 1,000 horses, and a ruby weighing 18 mithkals, and in exchange Timur would recognize Georgia as a Christian kingdom and the kingdom could retain its independence. Timur then passed through Tbilisi, destroying all monasteries and churches on his way, and went to Beylagan early in 1404. All the territories from Beylagan to Trebizond were officially given by Timur as an appanage to his grandson Khalil Mirza. Timur then finally left the Caucasus and headed for Central Asia, where he died on February 19, 1405, while preparing for a massive invasion of China.

== Aftermath ==
Georgia became tributary to the Timurids, Georgia was allowed to retain its independence and remain as a Christian kingdom.

=== George's campaign against the Timurids ===
Timur then finally left the Caucasus and headed for Central Asia, where he died on February 19, 1405, while preparing for a massive invasion of China. And the subsequent power struggles among his heirs, Timur's empire became fragmented as Miran Shah and his sons struggled over control of Persia. In the midst of this chaos, George VII, who had returned from Imereti, engaged in battles to regain lost territories. He conquered Nakhchivan and Ganja while also causing destruction in places like Ani, Erzurum, and Tabriz. Despite commanding an army of merely 5,000 men, George succeeded in expanding Georgia's borders temporarily to their former extent.

In 1406, the ruler of Iran gathered an army and camped in Alatagh, Caucasus. George suddenly attacked and drove the enemy towards Tabriz.

== See also ==
- Timurid conquests and invasions
- Timur's fifth invasion of Georgia
