= Khobi Monastery =

Georgian Orthodox monastery in western Georgia

- ხობის მონასტერი
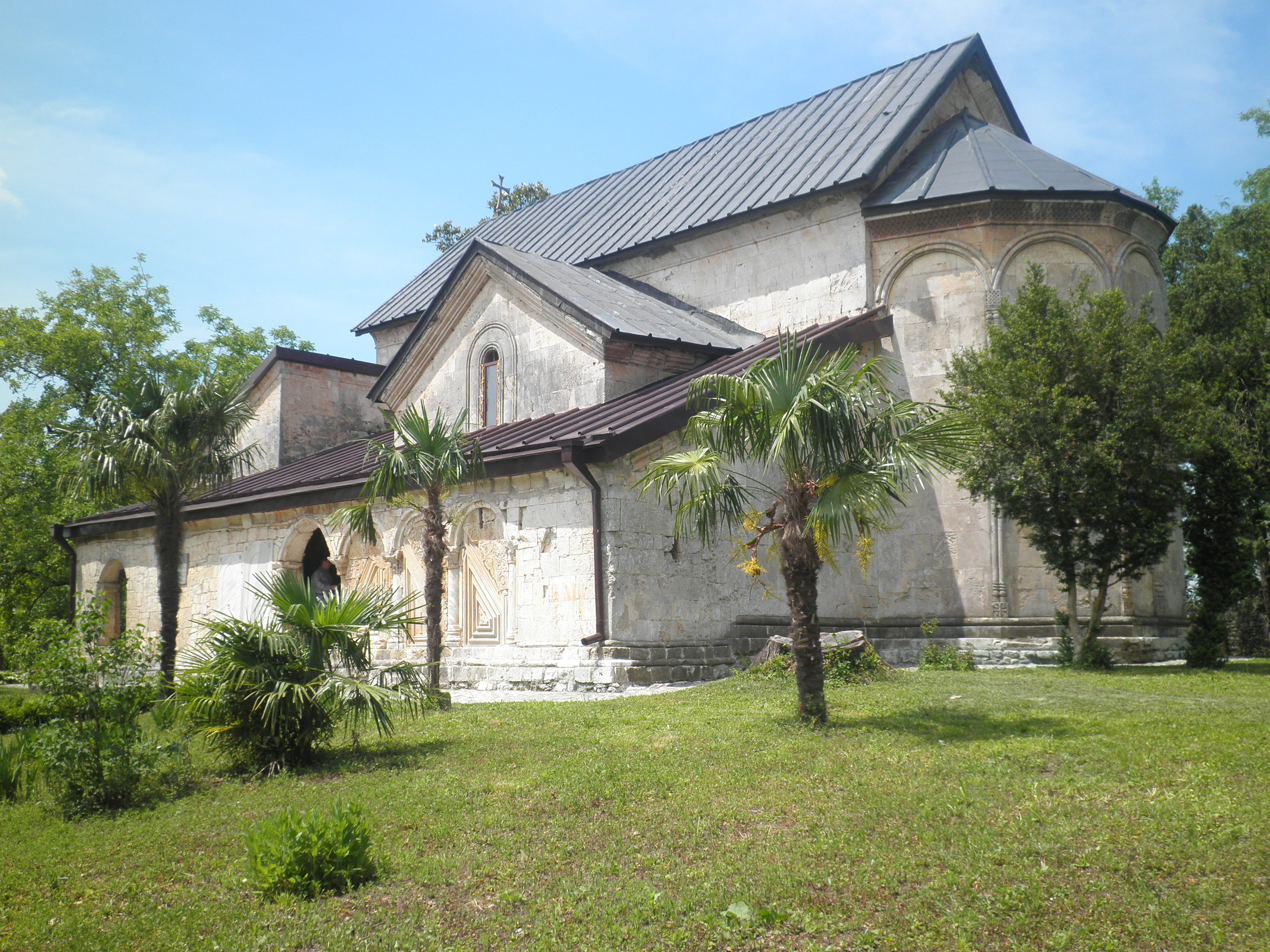
- Khobi Monastery
- Interactive map of Khobi Monastery
- Location: Nojikhevi, Khobi Municipality, Samegrelo-Zemo Svaneti, Georgia
- Coordinates: 42.335833°N 41.906944°E
- Type: Hall church

The Khobi Monastery Georgian: ხობის მონასტერი, romanized: khobis monast'eri), officially the Nojikhevi convent of the Dormition (ნოჯიხევის ყოვლადწმინდა ღვთისმშობლის მიძინების სახელობის დედათა მონასტერი), is a Georgian Orthodox monastery in western Georgia, near the town of Khobi. The church building is dated to the 13th century. Its exterior is adorned with ornamental stone carvings, while the interior contains frescoes. The monastery served as a dynastic abbey of the Dadiani of Mingrelia and housed several Christian relics and icons. The monastery is inscribed on the list of the Immovable Cultural Monuments of National Significance.

== History ==
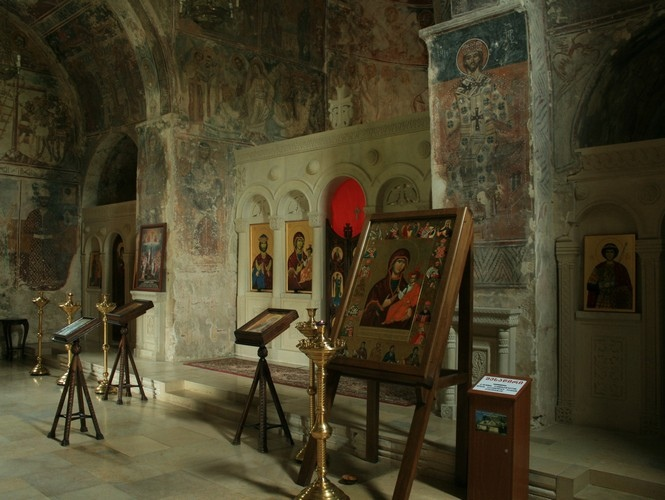
The interior.

The Khobi church stands at the village of Nojikhevi, some 3 km north of the town of Khobi, Khobi Municipality, in Georgia's Samegrelo-Zemo Svaneti region. The area is part of the historical and cultural province of Samegrelo (Mingrelia).

The first recorded mention of Khobi, then more commonly referred to as Khopi, and its bishop Egnate, occurs in a Georgian document from the Monastery of the Cross, dated to the period between 1212 and 1222. The exact date when the church was constructed is unknown, but the art historian Vakhtang Beridze's dating to the latter half of the 13th century has gained traction. The monastery served as a familial abbey and burial ground of the Dadiani, a princely dynasty of Mingrelia. The 17th-century visitors to Mingrelia reported that Khobi was venerated for the Christian relics it contained, such the Virgin May's robe and body parts of the saints Marina and Cyriacus. After a hiatus in the Soviet era, the Khobi church was restored to a Christian use and currently acts as a nunnery.

== Layout ==
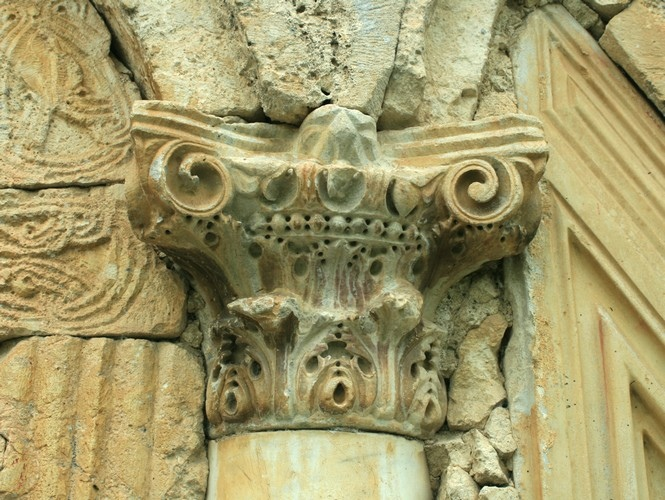
A marble capital, a 14th-century spoil of war from Zichia.

Khobi is a domeless hall church, with cross-vaults. The northwestern and southwestern corners had been assigned to individual chapels (eukterion), but later both of these were connected to the central bay. The entire length of the western and southern facades is flanked by an open gallery, which terminates in a closed chapel at the eastern end of the south facade. The facades are decorated with carved stonework. The internal walls adorned with a set of frescoes from the 13th–14th century—influenced by the late Byzantine Palaeologan art—and the 17th century. Apart from the religious paintings, there are frescoes depicting members of the Dadiani family, with Georgian inscriptions. A lengthy inscription on the southern chapel, in the medieval Georgian asomtavruli script, relates that a large collection of marble columns, capitals and fragments of the ambo was brought by Vameq I Dadiani (died 1396) from his victorious campaign against Zichia. These pieces of stonemasonry, some of them of Byzantine origin and dating from the 5th century, are used to decorate the walls of the chapel. Not far from the main church, there is a 14th–17th century bell-tower, ruins of a 17th century episcopal palace, and remains of a circuit wall, restored in a government-run project in 2016.
