= Alinja Tower =

Armenian fortress

Coordinates: 39.194414°N 45.696859°E

- Azerbaijani: Əlincə qalası
- Former names: Alenjik or Alinje

General information
- Location: To the west of Khanega village, not far from Julfa city, Azerbaijan

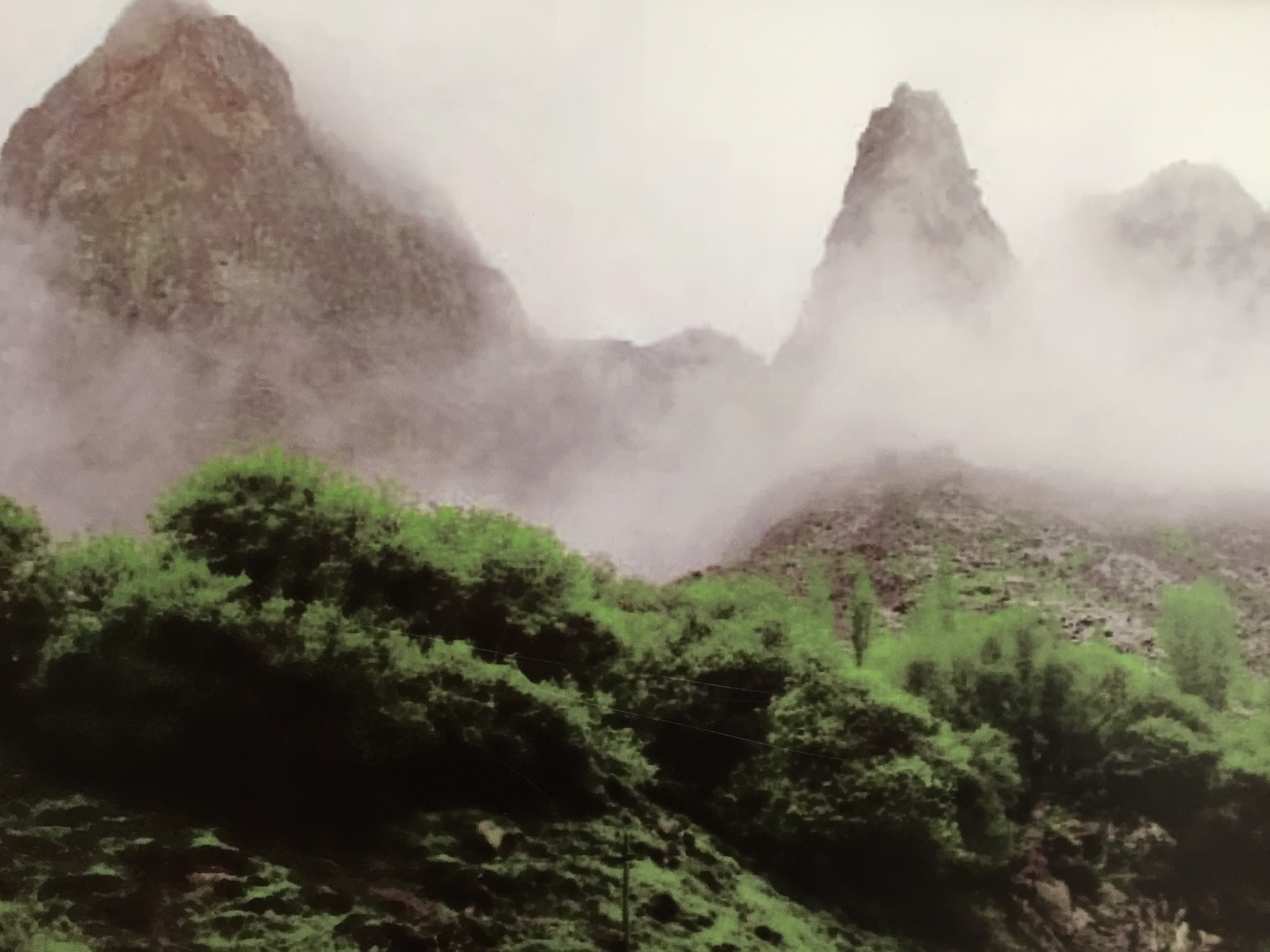
Alinj Castle

The Alinja Tower, also known as Alinjagala, Alinja-gala (Azerbaijani: Əlincə qalası) or the Armenian fortress of Yernjak up to the 14th century (Armenian: Երնջակ), is a tower located to the west of Khanega village, not far from Julfa city in Azerbaijan, on the right coast of the Alinja River (Alinjachay), higher of the Armenian monastery St. Karapet, on the top of Alinja Mountain. The tower was one of the strongest defensive buildings of its time.

== History ==
The first mentions are in sources from the 1st century. The tower was founded and belonged to the Armenian lords of Syunik. It was one of the important fortress in Armenia. By the 10th century, the tower was in the hands of the Bagratuni dynasty. In 914 Yusuf ibn Abi'l-Saj occupied Dvin and took captivity King of Armenia Smbat I. After that, Yusuf wanted to occupy the Armenian citadel, which resisted the Arabian army too long. He killed Smbat I in front of Yernjak with the purpose to force handing the fortress. Yernjak was captured to Arab emir of Goghtn a short time later. In the 13th century the fortress pass into the hands of the Armenian Orbelean family, who were lords of this part of Syunik. Perhaps the tower was their residence. In the 14th century, the tower already belonged to the Turkic dynasty of Ildegizids. Since then, Yernjak became called Alinja.

The main treasury of Iraq Seljuks was kept in the tower of the Ildegizids.

Defenders of the tower made strong resistance to occupants during the epoch of Timur’s invasion to this region. During 14 years, beleaguered soldiers defended the tower from Timur’s army and his son Miran Shah with the help of Georgians.

It was heavily restored in 2014–2015.

== Construction ==
There are many hydrotechnical, defensive, residential and palatial buildings in the tower, which were on the top of the mountain and on its slopes. Strong rows of stone walls led from the outskirts of the mountain to the top in a few lines. Cistern-pools once keeping rain and melt water remained in the shadow. The main treasury of Azerbaijani Atabeys was kept in Alinjagala tower.
