= List of monarchs of Georgia =

Rulers of Georgia from 302 BC to 1800 AD

King (mepe) of Georgia
- Georgian Crown

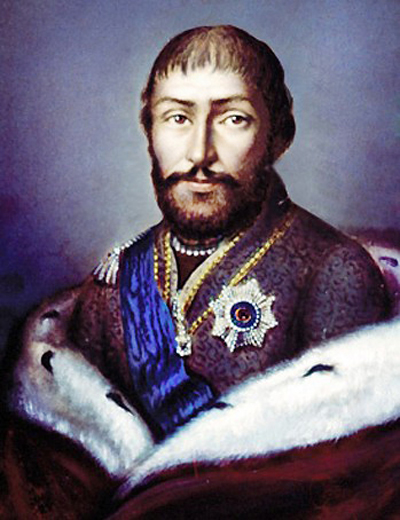
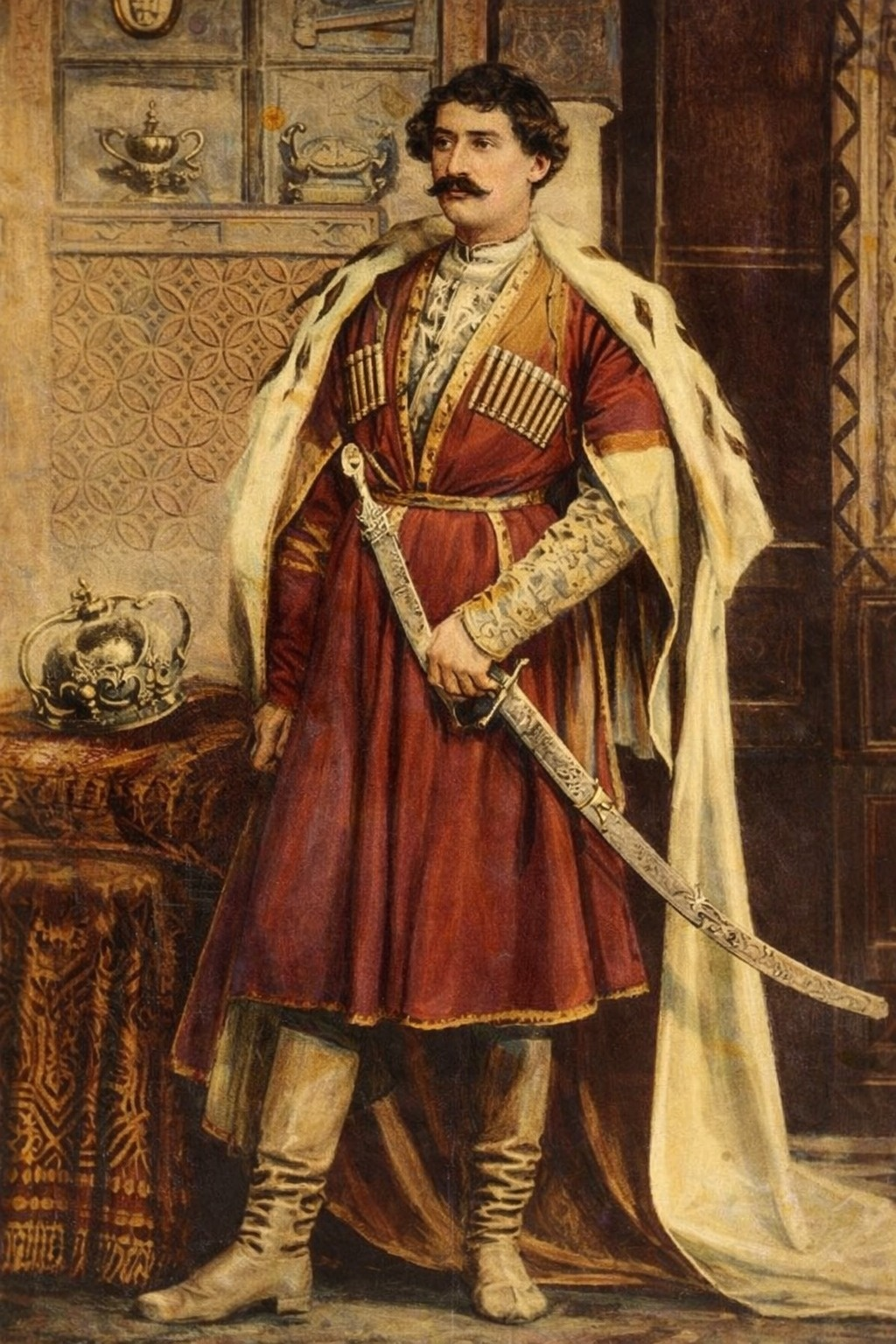
- Last to reign: George XII (left) and Solomon II (right)

Details
- Style: Style of the Georgian sovereign
- First monarch: Pharnavaz I
- Last monarch: George XII and Solomon II
- Formed: 302 BC
- Abolished: 1801; 1810
- Residence: Various historically (Note: Armazi and Mtskheta in the Kingdom of Iberia; Artanuji in the Kingdom of the Iberians; Kutaisi and later, Tbilisi in the Kingdom of Georgia; after the collapse of the Georgian realm, Kutaisi became a residence of the monarchs of the Kingdom of Imereti, and Tbilisi of the Kingdom of Kartli, while Gremi and Telavi, of the Kingdom of Kakheti.)
- Appointer: Hereditary monarchy
- Pretender: disputed

This is a list of kings and queens regnant of the kingdoms of Georgia before Russian annexation in 1801–1810.

For more comprehensive lists, and family trees, of Georgian monarchs and rulers see lists of monarchs of Georgia.

== Monarchs of Iberia ==
Pharnavazid dynasty
Artaxiad dynasty
Arsacid dynasty
Anti-king
Chosroid dynasty
Guaramid dynasty
Nersianid dynasty

=== Iberian kings ===
Name (Note: For the titles used, see Style of the Georgian sovereign.)	Portrait	Reign	Notes
Pharnavaz I ფარნავაზ I		302 – 234 BC	King of Iberia.
Sauromaces I საურმაგ I		234 – 159 BC	King of Iberia. Son of Pharnavaz.
Mirian I მირიან I		159 – 109 BC	King of Iberia. Son-in-law and adopted son of Sauromaces I.
Pharnajom ფარნაჯომი		109 – 90 BC	King of Iberia. Son of Mirian I.
Artaxias I არშაკ I		90 – 78 BC	King of Iberia. Husband of Pharnajom's sister.
Artoces არტაგი		78 – 63 BC	King of Iberia. Son of Artaxias I.
Pharnavaz II ფარნავაზ II		63 – 30 BC	King of Iberia. Son of Artoces.
Mirian II მირიან II		30 – 20 BC	King of Iberia. Son of Pharnajom.
Artaxias II არშაკ II		20 BC – 1 AD	King of Iberia. Son of Mirian II.
Pharasmanes I the Great ფარსმან I დიდი		1 – 58	King of Iberia. Grandson of Pharnavaz II.
Mihrdat I მირდატ I		58 – 106	King of Iberia. Son of Pharasmanes I.
Amazasp I ამაზასპი		106 – 116	King of Iberia. Son of Mihrdat I.
Pharasmanes II the Valiant ფარსმან II ქველი		116 – 132	King of Iberia. Son of Amazasp I.
Ghadam ღადამი		132 – 135	King of Iberia. Son of Pharasmanes II.
Pharasmanes III ფარსმან III		135 – 185	King of Iberia. Son of Ghadam.
Amazasp II ამაზასპ II		185 – 189	King of Iberia. Son of Pharasmanes III.
Rev I the Just რევ I მართალი		189 – 216	King of Iberia. Son of Amazasp II's sister.
Vache ვაჩე		216 – 234	King of Iberia. Son of Rev I.
Bacurius I ბაკურ I		234 – 249	King of Iberia. Son of Vache.
Mihrdat II მირდატ II		249 – 265	King of Iberia. Son of Bacurius I.
Amazasp III ამაზასპ III		260 – 265	Anti-king of Iberia.
Aspacures I ასფაგურ I		265 – 284	King of Iberia. Son of Mihrdat II.
Mirian III მირიან III		284 – 361	King of Iberia. Husband of Aspacures I's daughter. The 1st Georgian king who adopted Christianity and introduced it as a state religion during his reign. Co-ruled with his son Rev II (345–361).
Rev II რევ II		345 – 361	King of Iberia. Husband of Aspacures I's daughter. The 1st Georgian king who adopted Christianity and introduced it as a state religion during his reign. Co-ruled with his son Rev II (345–361).
Sauromaces II საურმაგ II		361 – 363	King of Iberia. Son of Rev II.
Aspacures II ასფაგურ II		363 – 365	King of Iberia. Son of Mirian III.
Mihrdat III მირდატ III		365 – 380, diarch 370–378	King of Iberia. Son of Aspacures II. Ruled with Sauromaces II between 370 and 378.
Aspacures III ასფაგურ III		380 – 394	King of Iberia. Son of Mihrdat III.
Trdat თრდატი		394 – 406	King of Iberia. Son of Rev II.
Pharasmanes IV ფარსმან IV		406 – 409	King of Iberia. Son of Aspacures III.
Mihrdat IV მირდატ IV		409 – 411	King of Iberia. Son of Aspacures III.
Archil I არჩილი		411 – 435	King of Iberia. Son of Mihrdat IV.
Mihrdat V მირდატ V		435 – 447	King of Iberia. Son of Archil.
Vakhtang I Gorgasali ვახტანგ I გორგასალი		447 – 522	King of Iberia. Son of Mihrdat V.
Dachi დაჩი		522 – 534	King of Iberia. Son of Vakhtang I.
Bacurius II ბაკურ II		534 – 547	King of Iberia. Son of Dachi.
Pharasmanes V ფარსმან V		547 – 561	King of Iberia. Son of Bacurius II.
Pharasmanes VI ფარსმან VI		561 – ?	King of Iberia. Son of Pharasmanes V's brother.
Bacurius III ბაკურ III		? – 580	The last king of Iberia. Son of Pharasmanes VI. Kingship was abolished by Hormizd IV of the Sasanian Empire.

=== Iberian presiding princes ===
Name	Portrait	Reign	Overlord
Guaram I		588 – 590	(Byzantine Empire) Maurice (588 – 602); Phocas (602 – 610); Heraclius (610 – 627)
Stephen I		590 – 627	(Byzantine Empire) Maurice (588 – 602); Phocas (602 – 610); Heraclius (610 – 627)
Adarnase I		627 – 642	(Byzantine Empire) Heraclius (610 – 627) (Rashidun Caliphate); Umar (640 – 642)
Stephen II		642 – 650	Umar (642 – 644); Uthman (644 – 654); Ali (654 – 661); Hasan (661) (Umayyad Caliphate); Mu'awiya I (661 – 680); Yazid I (680 – 683); Mu'awiya I (683 – 684); Marwan I (684 – 685); Abd al-Malik (685 – 705) al-Walid I (705 – 715); Sulayman (715 – 717); Umar (717 – 720); Yazid II (720 – 724); Hisham (724 – 743) al-Walid II (743 – 744); Yazid III (744); Ibrahim (744); Marwan II (744 – 750); Marwan II (748 – 750) (Abbasid Caliphate) al-Saffah (750 – 754) al-Mansur (754 – 772)
Adarnase II		650 – 684	Umar (642 – 644); Uthman (644 – 654); Ali (654 – 661); Hasan (661) (Umayyad Caliphate); Mu'awiya I (661 – 680); Yazid I (680 – 683); Mu'awiya I (683 – 684); Marwan I (684 – 685); Abd al-Malik (685 – 705) al-Walid I (705 – 715); Sulayman (715 – 717); Umar (717 – 720); Yazid II (720 – 724); Hisham (724 – 743) al-Walid II (743 – 744); Yazid III (744); Ibrahim (744); Marwan II (744 – 750); Marwan II (748 – 750) (Abbasid Caliphate) al-Saffah (750 – 754) al-Mansur (754 – 772)
Guaram II		684 – 693	Umar (642 – 644); Uthman (644 – 654); Ali (654 – 661); Hasan (661) (Umayyad Caliphate); Mu'awiya I (661 – 680); Yazid I (680 – 683); Mu'awiya I (683 – 684); Marwan I (684 – 685); Abd al-Malik (685 – 705) al-Walid I (705 – 715); Sulayman (715 – 717); Umar (717 – 720); Yazid II (720 – 724); Hisham (724 – 743) al-Walid II (743 – 744); Yazid III (744); Ibrahim (744); Marwan II (744 – 750); Marwan II (748 – 750) (Abbasid Caliphate) al-Saffah (750 – 754) al-Mansur (754 – 772)
Guaram III		693 – 748	Umar (642 – 644); Uthman (644 – 654); Ali (654 – 661); Hasan (661) (Umayyad Caliphate); Mu'awiya I (661 – 680); Yazid I (680 – 683); Mu'awiya I (683 – 684); Marwan I (684 – 685); Abd al-Malik (685 – 705) al-Walid I (705 – 715); Sulayman (715 – 717); Umar (717 – 720); Yazid II (720 – 724); Hisham (724 – 743) al-Walid II (743 – 744); Yazid III (744); Ibrahim (744); Marwan II (744 – 750); Marwan II (748 – 750) (Abbasid Caliphate) al-Saffah (750 – 754) al-Mansur (754 – 772)
Adarnase III		748 – 760	Umar (642 – 644); Uthman (644 – 654); Ali (654 – 661); Hasan (661) (Umayyad Caliphate); Mu'awiya I (661 – 680); Yazid I (680 – 683); Mu'awiya I (683 – 684); Marwan I (684 – 685); Abd al-Malik (685 – 705) al-Walid I (705 – 715); Sulayman (715 – 717); Umar (717 – 720); Yazid II (720 – 724); Hisham (724 – 743) al-Walid II (743 – 744); Yazid III (744); Ibrahim (744); Marwan II (744 – 750); Marwan II (748 – 750) (Abbasid Caliphate) al-Saffah (750 – 754) al-Mansur (754 – 772)
Nerse		760 – 772	Umar (642 – 644); Uthman (644 – 654); Ali (654 – 661); Hasan (661) (Umayyad Caliphate); Mu'awiya I (661 – 680); Yazid I (680 – 683); Mu'awiya I (683 – 684); Marwan I (684 – 685); Abd al-Malik (685 – 705) al-Walid I (705 – 715); Sulayman (715 – 717); Umar (717 – 720); Yazid II (720 – 724); Hisham (724 – 743) al-Walid II (743 – 744); Yazid III (744); Ibrahim (744); Marwan II (744 – 750); Marwan II (748 – 750) (Abbasid Caliphate) al-Saffah (750 – 754) al-Mansur (754 – 772)
Vacancy: 772 – 775
Nerse		775 – 780	al-Mansur (772 – 775) al-Mahdi (775 – 785) al-Hadi (785 – 786)
Stephen III		780 – 786	al-Mansur (772 – 775) al-Mahdi (775 – 785) al-Hadi (785 – 786)
Vacancy: 786 – 813

== Monarchs of all Georgia ==
=== Legend ===
Guaramid principality of Iberia (780–786) Direct rule of Iberia by the Abbasid Caliphate (786–813)	Duchy of Tao-Klarjeti (780–876)		
Principality of Iberia (813–888)	Duchy of Tao-Klarjeti (780–876)		
Principality of Iberia (813–888)	Duchy of Javakheti (830–882)	Duchy of Tao (830) Demoted to: Duchy of Upper Tao (930–1008) (Note: The lower Tao became almost permanent property of the main Iberian line.)	
Restored to: Kingdom of the Iberians (888–1008)		Duchy of Klarjeti (876–1028)	
			Annexed to the Byzantine Empire (1008–1073)
Unified: Kingdom of Georgia (1008–1259)
Kingdom of Western Georgia (1259–1330)		Kingdom of Eastern Georgia (1259–1330)	
Kingdom of Georgia (1330–1490) (Note: With brief re-divisions in Western and Eastern parts between 1387–1392 and 1396–1412. In 1412 Western Georgia accepted suzerainty from the Eastern part, and was demoted to Duchy of Imereti.)			Kingdom of Kakheti (1463–1746)
Kingdom of Imereti (1490–1810)		Kingdom of Kartli (1490–1746)	Kingdom of Kakheti (1463–1746)
Kingdom of Imereti (1490–1810)		Kingdom of Kartli-Kakheti (1746–1800)	
Annexed to the Russian Empire (1801; 1810)

=== Bagrationi monarchs ===
Ruler	Portrait	Born	Reign	Ruling part	Consort	Death	Notes
Adarnase I (ადარნასე I)		c. 740?	780 – 807	Duchy of Tao (from 786 in Javakheti only)	Unknown (daughter of Nerse of Iberia) one child	807 aged at least 66–67?	
Ashot I the Great (აშოტ I დიდი)		c. 770; Son of Adarnase	786 – 830	Duchy of Tao (with the Principality of Iberia since 813)	Unknown four children	c. 830; Nigali valley aged 59–60?	First of the Bagratid family to be Prince of Iberia, in 813. From his base in Tayk/Tao, he fought to enlarge the Bagratid territories and sought the Byzantine protectorate against the Arab encroachment. A patron of Christian culture and a friend of the church, he has been canonized by the Georgian Orthodox Church.
Bagrat I (ბაგრატ I)		822; Son of Ashot I	830 – 876	Duchy of Lower Tao (with the Principality of Iberia)	Unknown (of Armenia) (daughter of Smbat VIII Bagratuni) three children	876 aged at least 53–54	Children of Ashot, divided their patrimony. Bagrat was also Presiding Prince of Iberia, under Byzantine influence. Bagrat found himself in a constant struggle with the Arabs, the Abkhazians and the Kakhetians over the possession of central Iberia. Guaram left his property to his family, disregarding his own son.
Adarnase II (ადარნასე II)		c. 825; Son of Ashot I	830 – 867	Duchy of Upper Tao	Bevreli of Abkhazia (daughter of Bagrat I of Abkhazia) three children	867 aged at least 40–41	Children of Ashot, divided their patrimony. Bagrat was also Presiding Prince of Iberia, under Byzantine influence. Bagrat found himself in a constant struggle with the Arabs, the Abkhazians and the Kakhetians over the possession of central Iberia. Guaram left his property to his family, disregarding his own son.
Guaram (გუარამ)		c. 825; Son of Ashot I	830 – 882	Duchy of Javakheti	Unknown (of Armenia) (daughter of Smbat VIII Bagratuni) one child	882 aged at least 55–56	Children of Ashot, divided their patrimony. Bagrat was also Presiding Prince of Iberia, under Byzantine influence. Bagrat found himself in a constant struggle with the Arabs, the Abkhazians and the Kakhetians over the possession of central Iberia. Guaram left his property to his family, disregarding his own son.
Javakheti divided between both parts of Tao
Gurgen I (გურგენ I)		c. 850; First son of Adarnase II and Bevreli of Abkhazia	867 – 891	Duchy of Upper Tao (with the Principality of Iberia since 881)	Unknown (of Armenia) (daughter of Smbat VIII Bagratuni) two children	891 aged 40–41	Children of Adarnase II, divided their inheritance. Gurgen joined prince Adarnase and king Ashot I of Armenia against prince Nasra of Javakheti, who wanted to dispossess Adarnase of his patrimonial inheritance. Adarnase claimed a royal status since then, and Gurgen retained his patrimony. As for Sumbat, he ruled in Klarjeti with the title of mampali.
Sumbat I (სუმბატ I)		c. 850; Second son of Adarnase II of Tao-Klarjeti and Bevreli of Abkhazia	876 – 889	Principality of Klarjeti	Khosrovanush two children	889 aged 38–39	Children of Adarnase II, divided their inheritance. Gurgen joined prince Adarnase and king Ashot I of Armenia against prince Nasra of Javakheti, who wanted to dispossess Adarnase of his patrimonial inheritance. Adarnase claimed a royal status since then, and Gurgen retained his patrimony. As for Sumbat, he ruled in Klarjeti with the title of mampali.
David I (დავით I)		c. 850; Son of Bagrat I	876 – 881	Duchy of Lower Tao (with the Principality of Iberia)	Unknown (daughter of Constantine III of Abkhazia) two children	881 aged 30–31	
Adarnase IV (Note: Numbered IV, as he was the fourth ruler of Iberia of that name, after Adarnase III of Iberia, of the Nersianid dynasty) (ადარნასე IV)		c. 850; Son of David I	881 – 923 (Note: From here continues the line of presiding princes of Iberia, now as kings of Iberia.)	Kingdom of Iberia (in only Lower Tao until 888)	Unknown six children	923 aged 72–73	Adarnase, his cousin prince Gurgen of Iberia and king Ashot I of Armenia fought against prince Nasra of Tao-Klarjeti, who wanted to dispossess Adarnase of his patrimonial inheritance. The victory allowed the latter to claim a royal status for himself. Adarnase was, then, responsible for the restoration of the Iberian kingship, merging the principality of Iberia with his duchy of Lower Tao. The kingdom had been in abeyance since it had been abolished by Sasanian Empire in the 6th century.
David I the Great (დავით I)		c. 875; Son of Sumbat I	889 – 23 February 943	Duchy of Klarjeti	Unknown one child	23 February 943 aged 67–68	Children of Sumbat I, ruled jointly.
Bagrat I (ბაგრატი I)		c. 875; Son of Sumbat I	889 – 20 April 900	Duchy of Klarjeti	Unknown five children	20 April 900 aged 24–25	Children of Sumbat I, ruled jointly.
Adarnase III (ადარნასე III)		c. 875; First son of Gurgen I	891 – 896	Duchy of Upper Tao	Unknown three children	896 aged 20–21	
Regency of Duke Ashot of Upper Tao (აშოტ კუხი) (896–908)							Died young. Left no descendants, and was succeeded by his uncle.
David (დავით)		c. 890; First son of Adarnase III	896 – 908	Duchy of Upper Tao	Unmarried	908 aged 17–18?	Died young. Left no descendants, and was succeeded by his uncle.
Ashot I (II) the Immature (Note: Usually counted as I, but he was the second Ashot ruling in Tao, after Ashot the Great.) (აშოტ კუხი)		c. 875; Second son of Gurgen I	908 – 918	Duchy of Upper Tao	Unmarried	918; Tbeti aged 42–43?	Previous regent, later assumed the throne.
Gurgen II the Great (გურგენ II დიდი)		c. 890; Second son of Adarnase III	918 – 14 February 941	Duchy of Upper Tao	Unknown (of Klarjeti) (daughter of Ashot the Swift) one child	14 February 941 aged 50–51?	A patron of local monastic communities, Gurgen presided over the construction of a new cathedral at Khandzta. Gurgen was an energetic ruler and accumulated in his hands much power, ruling over Tao, parts of Klarjeti and Javakheti, and also Adjara and Nigali. The expansion of his territories was at the expense of his cousins and neighbours. However, left no male children and his lands went to his cousins.
David II (დავით II)		c. 890; Son of Adarnase IV	923 – 937	Kingdom of Iberia	Unmarried	937 aged 46–47	In spite of his royal title and unlike his father, David did not bear the traditional high Byzantine title of curopalates, which was bestowed by the emperor upon David's younger brother Ashot II. As a result, David's influence and prestige were overshadowed by those of this younger brother.
Sumbat I (სუმბატ I)		c. 890; Son of Adarnase IV	937 – 958	Kingdom of Iberia (with Lower Tao since 954)	Unknown two children	958 aged 67–68	Brothers of David II; The Iberian kingdom split and Lower Tao re-emerged, to be reunited with Upper Tao in 941. However, Lower Tao re-merged in Iberia in 954.
Ashot II (გურგენ II დიდი)		c. 890; Son of Adarnase IV of Iberia	937 – 25 February 954	Duchy of Tao (in only Lower Tao until 941)	Unmarried	25 February 954 aged 61–62	Brothers of David II; The Iberian kingdom split and Lower Tao re-emerged, to be reunited with Upper Tao in 941. However, Lower Tao re-merged in Iberia in 954.
Bagrat I (ბაგრატ I)		c. 890; Son of Adarnase IV of Iberia	937 – March 945	Duchy of Tao (in only Lower Tao until 941)	Unknown (of Klarjeti) (daughter of Ashot the Swift) one child	March 945 aged 54–55	Brothers of David II; The Iberian kingdom split and Lower Tao re-emerged, to be reunited with Upper Tao in 941. However, Lower Tao re-merged in Iberia in 954.
Sumbat II (სუმბატ II)		c. 910? Son of David I	23 February 943 – 988	Duchy of Klarjeti	Unknown one child	988 aged 77–78?	
Adarnase IV (Note: Sometimes rendeed as Adarnase V, if counting with the Iberian kingdom line.) (ადარნასე IV)		c. 910? Son of Bagrat I	25 February 954 – 961	Duchy of Upper Tao	Unknown two children	961 aged 50–51	Tao divided again; Adarnase received only the Upper part of Tao, while the Lower was again retained under the main Iberian line.
Bagrat II the Simple (ბაგრატ II რეგუენი)		c. 920? Son of Sumbat I	958 – 994	Kingdom of Iberia	Unmarried	994 aged 73–74?	Frequently appeared as a collaborator of his relative David III of Tao, the most influential person among the Bagratids of that time, aiding him against the Rawadids of Azerbaijan.
Bagrat II (ბაგრატ II)		c. 930? First son of Adarnase IV	961 – 966	Duchy of Upper Tao	Unmarried	966 aged 35–36?	
David III the Great (დავით III დიდი)		c. 930? Second son of Adarnase IV	966 – 1001	Duchy of Upper Tao	Unknown two children	1001 aged 70–71?	
David II (დავით II)		c. 930? Son of Sumbat II	988 – 993	Duchy of Klarjeti	Unmarried	993 aged 62–63?	Sons of Sumbat II, ruled jointly for forty days, before Bagrat's death.
Bagrat II (ბაგრატი II)		c. 930? Son of Sumbat II	988	Duchy of Klarjeti	Unknown two children	988 aged 57–58?	Sons of Sumbat II, ruled jointly for forty days, before Bagrat's death.
Sumbat III (სუმბატი III)		c. 950? Son of Bagrat II	993 – 1011	Duchy of Klarjeti	Unknown two children	1011 aged 60–61?	
Gurgen II (გურგენი II)		c. 940? Son of Bagrat II	994 – 1008	Kingdom of Iberia	Gurandukht of Abkhazia one child	1008 aged 67–68?	
In 1008, Bagrat, who had been King of Abkhazia since 978, inherited from his father Gurgen the crown of Iberia. The two kingdoms united into what came to be known as the Kingdom of Georgia.
Bagrat III the Unifier (ბაგრატ III)		c. 963; Kutaisi; Son of Gurgen of Georgia and Gurandukht of Abkhazia Adopted son of David III	1001 – 1008	Duchy of Upper Tao	Martha two children	7 May 1014; Tao aged 53/54	Nephew of Theodosius III of Abkhazia. United for the first time all the territory of Georgia.
Bagrat III the Unifier (ბაგრატ III)		c. 963; Kutaisi; Son of Gurgen of Georgia and Gurandukht of Abkhazia Adopted son of David III	1008 – 7 May 1014	Kingdom of Georgia	Martha two children	7 May 1014; Tao aged 53/54	Nephew of Theodosius III of Abkhazia. United for the first time all the territory of Georgia.
In 1008, Upper Tao was annexed to the Byzantine Empire, and was then recovered by Georgia in 1073, in the aftermath of the Battle of Manzikert
Bagrat III (ბაგრატ III)		c. 970? Son of Sumbat III	1011 – 1028	Duchy of Klarjeti	Unmarried	1028 aged 57–58?	In 1028 he was imprisoned by Bagrat IV of Georgia, and died during captivity. His lands were absorbed by Georgia.
In 1028, Klarjeti was annexed to Georgia
George I (გიორგი I)		998 or 1002; Kutaisi; Son of Bagrat III and Martha	7 May 1014 – 16 August 1027	Kingdom of Georgia	Mariam of Vaspurakan c. 1018 (annulled) four children Alda of Alania one child	16 August 1027; Mqinwarni or Itaroni aged 30–31	
Regency of Mariam of Vaspurakan (მარიამი, Մարիամ) (1027–1037)							His mother, while regent, negotiated a peace treaty with the Byzantine Empire, and returned with the high Byzantine title of curopalates for Bagrat in 1032. Bagrat had the opposition of: Prince Demetrius of Anacopia (დემეტრე) (1027–42), Magistros, Bagrat's half-brother, and son of Alda of Alania, had the support of his mother, the Byzantine Empire and the Liparitid clan.; Prince George of Georgia (გიორგი) (1050–53), Bagrat's heir, opposed to his father for a brief period.
Bagrat IV (ბაგრატ IV)		1018 or 1020; Son of George I and Mariam of Vaspurakan	16 August 1027 – 24 November 1072	Kingdom of Georgia	Helena Argyre; 1032; Kutaisi no children Borena of Alania; Between 1033 and 1040 three children	24 November 1072; Marabda aged 53–54	His mother, while regent, negotiated a peace treaty with the Byzantine Empire, and returned with the high Byzantine title of curopalates for Bagrat in 1032. Bagrat had the opposition of: Prince Demetrius of Anacopia (დემეტრე) (1027–42), Magistros, Bagrat's half-brother, and son of Alda of Alania, had the support of his mother, the Byzantine Empire and the Liparitid clan.; Prince George of Georgia (გიორგი) (1050–53), Bagrat's heir, opposed to his father for a brief period.
George II (გიორგი II)		c. 1050; Kutaisi; Son of Bagrat IV and Borena of Alania	24 November 1072 – 1089 1089–1112 (nominally)	Kingdom of Georgia	Helen c. 1070 one child	1112 aged 57–58	Previously opposed to his father. Unable to deal effectively with the constant Seljuk Turkish attacks and overwhelmed by internal problems in his kingdom, George was forced to abdicate in favor of his energetic son David, to whom he remained a nominal co-ruler until his death in 1112.
David IV the Builder (Note: When numbering this king, the rule used often includes David III of Tao, which makes the Builder the fourth king David.) (დავით IV აღმაშენებელი)		1073; Kutaisi; Son of George II and Helen	1089 – 24 January 1125	Kingdom of Georgia	Rusudan of Armenia c. 1090 (annulled 1107) four children? Gurandukht c. 1107 four children?	24 January 1125; Tbilisi aged 51–52	Popularly considered to be the greatest and most successful Georgian ruler in history and an original architect of the Georgian Golden Age, he succeeded in driving the Seljuk Turks out of the country in 1121. His reforms enabled him to reunite the country and bring most of the lands of the Caucasus under Georgia's control.
Demetrius I (დემეტრე I)		1093; Son of David IV and Rusudan of Armenia	24 January 1125 – 1154 1155–1156	Kingdom of Georgia	Unknown; Before 1130 four children	1156; Mtskheta aged 62–63	Also a poet. In 1154, he was forced by his own son David to abdicate and become a monk. With David's death months later, he was restored to the throne, but did not survive much longer. Demetrius had the opposition of: Prince David (დავით) (1130), Demetrius' heir, opposed to his father for a brief period. Even with the rebellion crushed, he ended up expelling his father from the throne.
David V (დავით V)		1113; First son of Demetrius I	1154 – 1155	Kingdom of Georgia	Unknown; Before 1130 at least one child	1155 aged 40–41	Previous opponent against his father. Forced him to abdicate, but died a few months later.
George III (გიორგი III)		c. 1115; Second son of Demetrius I	1155 – 27 March 1184	Kingdom of Georgia	Burdukhan of Alania c. 1155 two children	27 March 1184 aged 68–69	His reign was part of what would be called the Georgian Golden Age – a historical period in the High Middle Ages, during which the Kingdom of Georgia reached the peak of its military power and development. However, George had the opposition of: Prince Demetrius of Georgia (დემეტრე) (1177–78), son of David V, had the support of the Orbeli noble family.
Tamar I the Great (თამარ მეფე)		c. 1160; Daughter of George III and Burdukhan of Alania	27 March 1184 – 18 January 1213	Kingdom of Georgia	Yury Bogolyubsky c. 1185 (annulled 1187) no children David Soslan; 1189 two children	18 January 1213; Agarani aged 52–53	Co-ruler with her father since 1178. Ruled in a period of political and military successes and cultural achievements, presiding the peak of the Georgian Golden Age.
George IV the Resplendent (გიორგი IV ლაშა)		1192; Son of David Soslan and Queen Tamar	18 January 1213 – 18 January 1223	Kingdom of Georgia	Unmarried	18 January 1223; Bagavan aged 31–32	Co-ruler with his mother since 1207, continued her policy, but, at the end of his reign was defeated by a Mongol expedition.
Rusudan (რუსუდან მეფე)		1194; Daughter of David Soslan and Queen Tamar	18 January 1223 – 1245	Kingdom of Georgia	Ghias ad-Din c. 1223 (annulled 1226) two children	1245; Tbilisi aged 50–51	Period marked by Mongol invasions of Georgia. The queen was forced to accept the sovereignty of the Mongol Khan in 1242, to pay an annual tribute and to support the Mongols with a Georgian army.
David VI & I the Clever (დავით VI ნარინი)		1225; Son of Ghias ad-din and Queen Rusudan	1245 – 1293 (Note: After David VI's disappearance in 1246, the Georgians elected David VII, illegitimate son of George IV as King; However, in 1248, when David VII went to the Mongols to obtain his recognition, he found there the missing king; the Mongol khan ordered for both of them to rule together, with David VI as a junior co-ruler.)	Kingdom of Western Georgia (in all Georgia until 1259)	Tamar Amanelisdze before 1254 three children Theodora Doukaina Palaiologina of Byzantium; 1254 one child	1293; Tbilisi aged 67–68	Co-ruler with his mother since 1230, David VI disappeared from Georgia in 1246, and was found with the Mongols by the newly elected ruler, his cousin David VII, in 1248. Both were forced to share power, and, albeit rising against Mongol domination (1259), David VI failed and had to flee to Kutaisi in Western Georgia. Establishing there a new kingdom, he successfully maintained trade and contacts with the West. He also built friendly relations with the Golden Horde and Bahri dynasty of Egypt, repulsed the Ilkhanate attacks, and interfered in Trebizond's politics. As for David VII, the Mongol dominance and the taxes he was subject to eventually led to a political and economic crisis in the kingdom.
David VII the Elder (დავით VII ულუ)		1215; Illegitimate son of George IV	1248 – 1270	Kingdom of Eastern Georgia (in all Georgia until 1259)	Jigda-Khatun before 1252 no children Altun of Alania (in bigamy, repudiated 1252) c. 1249 Gvantsa Kakhaberidze (in polygamy until 1252); 1250 one child Esukan; 1263 no children	1270; Tbilisi aged 54–55	
Between 1259 and 1330, due to the consequences of the Mongol invasions, Georgia was ruled by two distinct kings. David VI and David VII, who had ruled together as vassals of the Mongols, ruled distinct parts of the country from 1259. However, there were several moments in which the Eastern kingdom had dominance over all Georgia.
Demetrius II the Devoted (დემეტრე II თავდადებული)		1259; Son of David VII and Gvantsa Kakhaberidze	1270 – 12 March 1289	Kingdom of Eastern Georgia	Theodora Megala Komnene of Trebizond; 1277 five children Solghar of Mongolia (in polygamy?); Before 1280 three children Natela Jaqeli (in polygamy?); 1280 one child	12 March 1289; Movakani aged 29–30	Criticized for his possible polygamy. Executed by the Great Khan.
Vakhtang II (Note: Styled II after Vakhtang I of Iberia.) (ვახტანგ II)		c. 1250; Son of David VI and Tamar Amanelisdze	12 March 1289 – 1292	Kingdom of Eastern Georgia	Oljath Khan; 1289 no children	1292 aged 41–42?	Ascended in Eastern Georgia, with the consent of the Mongols.
Constantine I (კონსტანტინე I)		c. 1260 (Note: Despite traditionally associated as children of David VI's first wife (Tamar Amanelisdze), Constantine and Michael's names, of Byzantine origin, seem to hint for David VI's second wife, Theodora Doukaina Palaeologina, as their mother. Moreover, a son of Michael is referred as minor in 1329, which would be highly unlikely if Michael himself was born before 1254, as it would be if he were a son of Tamar.); Son of David VI and Tamar Amanelisdze	1293 – 1327	Kingdom of Western Georgia	Unknown; Before 1327 no children	1327 aged 66–67?	Unlike his eastern counterparts, Constantine remained independent from the Ilkhanid hegemony. However, his troubled reign was marked by the opposition of his brother, Michael.
David VIII (დავით VIII)		1273; First son of Demetrius II and Theodora Megala Komnene of Trebizond	1292 – 1302 1308 – 1311	Kingdom of Eastern Georgia	Oljath; 1291 no children Unknown, from Surameli family 1302 one child	1311 aged 37–38	Refused to submit to the orders of the Mongols, and between 1299 and 1308 he was declared a deposed king, as his own brothers were supported by the Mongol Khan. Albeit forced to abdicate of the throne by his brother Vakhtang, after the latter's death he was restored as king. In 1299, the Ilkhanid khan Ghazan installed his brother as a rival ruler: George V, King of Georgia (1299–1302), his authority did not extend beyond the Mongol-protected capital Tbilisi, so George was referred to during this period as "The Shadow King of Tbilisi". Historians number him "V" because of this period.
Vakhtang III (ვახტანგ III)		1275; Second son of Demetrius II and Theodora Megala Komnene of Trebizond	1302 – 1308	Kingdom of Eastern Georgia	Ripsime; 1297 two children	1308 aged 31–32	
Regency of Prince George of Georgia (1311–1313)							Has as regent his uncle, prince George, who had opposed his father. Died as minor, and this uncle took power.
George VI the Minor (გიორგი VI მცირე)		1303/4; Son of David VIII	1311 – 1318	Kingdom of Eastern Georgia	Unmarried	1318 aged 15–16	Has as regent his uncle, prince George, who had opposed his father. Died as minor, and this uncle took power.
George V the Brilliant (Note: Numbered lower than his predecessor, as he was already politically active as opponent of his brother David VIII in 1299–1302.) (გიორგი V ბრწყინვალე)		1286; Son of Demetrius II and Natela Jaqeli	1318 – 1346	Kingdom of Georgia (in Eastern Georgia until 1330)	Unknown before 1346 one son	1346 aged 59–60	"Re-ascended" as a fully recognized king, reuniting Georgia in 1330. A flexible and far-sighted politician, he recovered Georgia from a century-long Mongol domination, restoring the country's previous strength and Christian culture.
Michael (მიქელ I)		c. 1260; Third son of David VI and Tamar Amanelisdze	1327 – 1329	Kingdom of Western Georgia	Unknown c. 1270 one child	1329 aged 68–69?	Opposed his brother, Constantine I. Sought to resubjugate to the crown the great nobles and provincial dynasts who had asserted greater autonomy for themselves in the reign of Constantine I.
Council of Regency (1329–1330)							Still a minor, was deposed by George V.
Bagrat I the Minor (ბაგრატ I მცირე)		c. 1320; Son of Michael I	1329 – 1330	Kingdom of Western Georgia	Unknown (a daughter of Qvarqvare II Jaqeli); 1358 three children	1372 aged 51–52?	Still a minor, was deposed by George V.
Western Georgia reunited with the Eastern part
David IX (დავით IX)		c. 1300? Son of George V	1346 – 1360	Kingdom of Georgia	Sindukhtar Jaqeli c. 1330? two children	1360 aged 59–60?	The prosperity of the kingdom did not last, as the Black Death swept through the area in 1348. In 1360, Georgia lost Armenia.
Bagrat V the Great (ბაგრატ V დიდი)		c. 1330? Son of David XI and Sindukhtar Jaqeli	1360 – 1393	Kingdom of Georgia (in Eastern Georgia during a brief division period in 1387–1392)	Helen c. 1360 three children Anna of Trebizond; June 1366 one child	1393 aged 62–63?	A fair and popular ruler, he was briefly captured by Timur but eventually regained his freedom and throne.
Alexander I (ალექსანდრე I)		c. 1360; First son of Bagrat I	1387 – 1389	Kingdom of Imereti	Anna; Before 1389 two children	1389 aged 28–29?	Rebelled against the main power in Georgia; Western part separated again.
George I (გიორგი I)		c. 1360; Second son of Bagrat I	1389–1392	Kingdom of Imereti	Unmarried	1392 aged 31–32?	After his death in 1392, Western Georgia is reincorporated in the Eastern part.
Western Georgia reunited with the Eastern part
George VII (გიორგი VII)		c. 1360; Son of Bagrat V and Helen	1393–1407	Kingdom of Eastern Georgia (in all Georgia until 1396)	Unmarried	1407 aged 46–47?	In 1396, Constantine took advantage of George VII's continuous war with Timur—in which a great number of Imeretians died—and the death of Vameq Dadiani and returned to Imereti.
Constantine II (კონსტანტინე II)		c. 1360; Third son of Bagrat I	1396 – 1401	Kingdom of Western Georgia	Unmarried	1401 aged 40–41?	In 1396, Constantine took advantage of George VII's continuous war with Timur—in which a great number of Imeretians died—and the death of Vameq Dadiani and returned to Imereti.
Constantine I (კონსტანტინე I)		c. 1366; Son of Bagrat V and Helen	1407 – 1412	Kingdom of Eastern Georgia	Natia Amirejibi c. 1389 three children	1412 aged 45–46	
Demetrius I (დემეტრე I)		Before 1389; Son of Alexander I and Anna	1401 – 1412	Kingdom of Western Georgia	Unknown; Before 1445 no children	1445 aged at least 55–56	From 1412 accepts suzerainty from Georgia and rules as duke of Imereti.
Western Georgia reunited with the Eastern part
Alexander I the Great (ალექსანდრე I დიდი)		1390; Son of Constantine I and Natia Amirejibi	1412 – 1442	Kingdom of Georgia	Dulandukht Orbeliani c. 1411 three children Tamar of Western Georgia c. 1414 three children	27 August 1445 or 7 March 1446 aged 58–60	Regained Imereti in 1412. Despite his efforts to restore the country from the ruins left by the Turco-Mongol warlord Timur's invasions, Georgia never recovered and faced the inevitable fragmentation that was followed by a long period of stagnation. He was the last ruler of a united Georgia which was relatively free from foreign domination. Abdicated.
Demetrius III (დიმიტრი III)		c. 1413; First son of Alexander I and Dulandukht Orbeliani	1442 – December 1446	Kingdom of Georgia	Gulashar (d. 1472) c. 1450 one child	1453 aged 39–40	Co-rulers since 1433. Demetrius abdicated after his brother's death.
Vakhtang IV (ვახტანგ IV)		c. 1413; Second son of Alexander I and Dulandukht Orbeliani	1442 – December 1446	Kingdom of Georgia	Sitikhatun Panaskerteli-Tsitsishvili c. 1442 no children	December 1446 aged 32–33	Co-rulers since 1433. Demetrius abdicated after his brother's death.
George VIII (გიორგი VIII)		1417; Son of Alexander I and Tamar of Imereti	December 1446 – 1466	Kingdom of Georgia (in Eastern Georgia only since 1463)	Tamar Jaqeli; 1445 three children Nestan-Darejan; 1456 two children	1476 aged 58–59	In 1463 lost Imereti once more. From 1465, renounced Georgia and ruled only in Kakheti.
George VIII (გიორგი VIII)		1417; Son of Alexander I and Tamar of Imereti	1466 – 1476	Kingdom of Kakheti	Tamar Jaqeli; 1445 three children Nestan-Darejan; 1456 two children	1476 aged 58–59	In 1463 lost Imereti once more. From 1465, renounced Georgia and ruled only in Kakheti.
Bagrat VI (ბაგრატ VI)		1435; Son of Prince George of Georgia	1463 – 1478	Kingdom of Georgia (in Western Georgia only until 1466)	Helen (d. 3 November 1510) three children	1478 aged 42–43	Paternal grandson of Constantine I of Georgia. In 1463 rose as King of Imereti, and in 1466 ascended in Kartli (the part George VIII renounced), reuniting it with Imereti.
Alexander I (ალექსანდრე I)		c. 1454/56; Son of George VIII and Nestan-Darejan	1476 – 27 April 1511	Kingdom of Kakheti	Anna Cholokashvili two children Tinatin	27 April 1511 aged 65–66	Alexander's pliancy and flexible diplomacy earned him security from the neighboring powers, only to be murdered by his own son George II "the Bad". He recognized the suzerainty of Ismail I of Persia at the beginning of the 16th century.
Alexander II (ალექსანდრე II)		c. 1460? Son of Bagrat VI and Helen	1478	Kingdom of Georgia	Tamar (d. 12 March 1510) seven children	1 April 1510; Kutaisi aged 49–50?	After being deposed by his uncle Constantine II, Alexander recovered Imereti after Constantine's defeat at the hands of Qvarqvare II Jaqeli, a powerful atabeg of Samtskhe, in 1483, but lost Kutaisi to Constantine again a year later. In 1490, Alexander took advantage of the Ak Koyunlu Turkoman invasion of Kartli, and seized control of Imereti.
Alexander II (ალექსანდრე II)		c. 1460? Son of Bagrat VI and Helen	1484 – 1 April 1510	Kingdom of Western Georgia (until 1490) Kingdom of Imereti (since 1490)	Tamar (d. 12 March 1510) seven children	1 April 1510; Kutaisi aged 49–50?	After being deposed by his uncle Constantine II, Alexander recovered Imereti after Constantine's defeat at the hands of Qvarqvare II Jaqeli, a powerful atabeg of Samtskhe, in 1483, but lost Kutaisi to Constantine again a year later. In 1490, Alexander took advantage of the Ak Koyunlu Turkoman invasion of Kartli, and seized control of Imereti.
Constantine II (კონსტანტინე II)		1447; Son of Demetrius III and Gulashar	1478 – 1505	Kingdom of Kartli (in Georgia until 1490)	Tamar (d. 1492); 1473 eleven children	1505 aged 57–58	Paternal grandson of Alexander I of Georgia. Early in the 1490s, he had to recognise the independence of his rival rulers of Imereti and Kakheti, and to confine his power to Kartli.
In 1490, after several decades of dynastic infighting, a national council agreed on the division of the Kingdom of Georgia into three kingdoms. The Kings of Georgia retained the largest portion of the divided kingdom which reverted to its old name of Kartli. Imereti and Kakheti emerged as the other two Bagrationi kingdoms created out of the division.
David X (დავით X)		1482; First son of Constantine II and Tamar	1505 – 1526	Kingdom of Kartli	Nestan-Darejan Baratashvili no children Tamar (Jaqeli?) (d. 1554) eight children	1526; Tbilisi aged 43–44	Despite the fact that Constantine had recognised the independence of the breakaway Georgian kingdoms of Imereti and Kakheti, the rivalry among these polities was to continue under David. He had to defend his kingdom against the attacks by Alexander II of Imereti and George II of Kakheti.
Bagrat III (ბაგრატ III)		23 September 1495; Son of Alexander II and Tamar	1 April 1510 – September 1565	Kingdom of Imereti	Helen six children	September 1565 aged 69–70	Faced repeated assaults from the Ottoman Turks as well as conflicts with his ostensible vassal princes of Mingrelia, Guria, and Abkhazia who were frequently joining the enemy.
George II (გიორგი II)		? Son of Alexander I and Anna Cholokashvili	27 April 1511 – 1513	Kingdom of Kakheti	Helen Cholokashvili three children	1513; Tbilisi	After a failed incursion in Kartli, ended in prison, where he was soon killed.
Kakheti briefly annexed to Kartli
Levan (ლევანი)		1504; Tbilisi; Son of George II and Helen Cholokashvili	1518 – 1574	Kingdom of Kakheti	Tinatin Gurieli (annulled 1529) three children Unknown (daughter of Kamal Kara-Musel, Shamkhal of Tarku) thirteen children	1574; Tbilisi aged 69–70	Restored the kingdom of Kakheti and presided over the most prosperous and peaceful period in its history.
George IX (გიორგი IX)		c. 1485; Second son of Constantine II and Tamar	1525 – 1527	Kingdom of Kartli	Unmarried	1539/40 aged 53–54?	Abdicated to his nephew.
Luarsab I (ლუარსაბ I)		1502; Son of David X and Tamar (Jaqeli)	1527 – 1556	Kingdom of Kartli	Tamar of Imereti eight children	1556; Garisi aged 53–54	Persistent in his resistance against Safavid Persian aggression, he was killed in the Battle of Garisi.
Simon I the Great (სიმონ I დიდი)		1537; Second son of Luarsab I and Tamar of Imereti	1556 – 1569 1578 – 1600	Kingdom of Kartli	Nestan-Darejan of Kakheti; 1559; Six children	1611; Constantinople aged 73–74	His first reign was marked by war against the Persian domination of Georgia. In 1569 he was captured by the Persians, and spent nine years in captivity. In 1578 he was released and reinstalled in Kartli. During this period (i.e. his second reign), he fought as a Persian subject against the Ottoman domination of Georgia. In 1599 Simon I was captured by the Ottomans and died in captivity.
George II (გიორგი II)		c. 1515; Son of Bagrat III and Helen	1565 – 1585	Kingdom of Imereti	Unknown one child Rusudan Sharvashidze (d. 1578) two children Christina-Tamar Diasamidze three children	1585 aged 69–70	With his ascend to the throne, George found himself involved in the civil war among his vassals.
David XI; Daud Khan (დავით XI, დაუთ-ხანი)		1540; Third son of Luarsab I and Tamar of Imereti	1569 – 1578	Kingdom of Kartli	Helen (relative of Alexander II of Kakheti) four children	c. 1579; Constantinople aged less than 38–39?	A convert to Islam, he was appointed as Khan of Kartli by the Persian Shah Tahmasp I from 1562 (effectively from 1569) to 1578.
Alexander II (ალექსანდრე II)		1527; Tbilisi; Son of Levan and Tinatin Gurieli	1574 – October 1601 21 October 1602 – 12 March 1605	Kingdom of Kakheti	Tinatin Amilakhvari eight children	12 March 1605; Dzegami aged 77–78	In spite of a precarious international situation, he managed to retain relative economic stability in his kingdom and tried to establish contacts with the Tsardom of Russia. In October 1601, Alexander's son, David, revolted from the royal authority and seized the crown, forcing his father to retire to a monastery. David would die a year later, on October 2, 1602, and Alexander was able to resume the throne. Alexander fell victim to the Persian-sponsored coup led by his other son, Constantine.
Levan (ლევანი)		1573; Son of George II and Rusudan Sharvashidze	1585 – 1590	Kingdom of Imereti	Marekhi Dadiani no children	1590 aged 17–18	With his ascension to the throne, Leon faced a revolt by his own uncle, Constantine, who defied the royal authority and took control of Upper Imereti. Leon made an alliance with the Mingrelian prince Mamia IV Dadiani, and forced Constantine to surrender in 1587. He then would also face the hostilities of Simon I of Kartli and his own brother-in-law, who deposed him.
Rostom (როსტომი)		1561; Son of Prince Constantine and Helen	1590 – 1605	Kingdom of Imereti	Unmarried	1605 aged 33–34	With support of Mamia IV Dadiani, Rostom was raised to the throne, but his authority was defied by Giorgi II Gurieli, who employed an Ottoman force to dethrone the king in favor of Bagrat IV (paternal grandson of Bagrat III). After Rostom fled to Mingrelia, Simon I of Kartli deposed Bagrat IV and brought most of Imereti under his control. Manuchar I Dadiani rejected Simon's ultimatum, moved into Imereti, defeated the invaders and reinstated Rostom as king. However, the authority started to be held by an aristocratic élite, notably by the prince of Mingrelia.
Bagrat IV (ბაგრატ IV)		? Son of Prince Teimuraz (Note: Son of Bagrat III. Professor Cyril Toumanoff considered Bagrat to have been a son of another Teimuraz, son of Prince Vakhtang of Imereti.)	1590	Kingdom of Imereti	Unmarried	c. 1590	
George X (გიორგი X)		1560; Tbilisi; Son of Simon I and Nestan-Darejan of Kakheti	1600 – 7 September 1606	Kingdom of Kartli	Tamar Lipartiani (d. 1614); 15 September 1578 five children	7 September 1606; Constantinople aged 44–45	Fought alongside his father against the Ottoman occupation forces since 1598. Held power after Simon was taken captive by the Ottomans at the Battle of Nakhiduri in 1599. George attempted several times, though vainly, to ransom his father (who would die as a prisoner in 1612) from captivity and even offered his son as hostage to the Sublime Porte. Supported the Persians against the Ottomans. He was the first king of Kartli who attempted to establish diplomatic ties with the northern co-religionist power of Muscovy. However, unstable political situation in both countries terminated these contacts.
David I (დავით I)		? Gremi; Son of Alexander II and Tinatin Amilakhvari	October 1601 – 21 October 1602	Kingdom of Kakheti	Ketevan of Mukhrani, the Martyr; 1581 four children	21 October 1602; Gremi	In mid-1601, he capitalized on the illness of his father and gained an effective control of the government. However, died a year later. His father then recovered the throne.
Constantine I Kustandil Khan (კონსტანტინე I, კონსტანტინე ხანი)		1566; Son of Alexander II and Tinatin Amilakhvari	12 March – 22 October 1605	Kingdom of Kakheti	Unknown (a daughter of Mohammad Khan Torkman)	22 October 1605; Tbilisi aged 34–35	His subjects refused to recognize a patricide (he murdered Alexander II) and revolted. The rebellion was led by Constantine's sister-in-law, the widow Ketevan, who requested aid from George X of Kartli. Constantine bribed some of the rebel nobles, but in the end had to flee. The rebels sent emissaries to Abbas I of Persia and pledged loyalty, provided that Abbas confirmed their candidate, Ketevan's son Teimuraz, as a Christian king of Kakheti.
George III (გიორგი III)		c. 1570; Son of Prince Constantine	1605 – 1639	Kingdom of Imereti	Tamar (d. 1639) five children	1639 aged 68–69	His authority was seriously undermined by the energetic prince of Mingrelia, Levan II Dadiani, whose increasing influence George tried to restrict without success.
Regency of Ketevan of Mukhrani (ქეთევან წამებული) (1605–1614)							An admirer of Persian poetry, Teimuraz translated into Georgian several Persian love stories and transformed the personal experiences of his reign into a series of original poems influenced by the contemporary Persian tradition. From 1614 on, he waged a five-decade long struggle against the Safavid Persian domination of Georgia in the course of which he was thrice deposed and lost several members of his family. Teimuraz died as the shah's prisoner at Astarabad.
Teimuraz I (თეიმურაზ I)		1589; Son of David I and Ketevan of Mukhrani	1606 – 1648 (Note: Safavid Iran invaded Kakheti between 1616–1625 and 1633–1634.)	Kingdom of Kakheti	Anna Gurieli; 1607 two children Khoreshan of Kartli; 1612 three children	1661; Gorgan aged 71–72	An admirer of Persian poetry, Teimuraz translated into Georgian several Persian love stories and transformed the personal experiences of his reign into a series of original poems influenced by the contemporary Persian tradition. From 1614 on, he waged a five-decade long struggle against the Safavid Persian domination of Georgia in the course of which he was thrice deposed and lost several members of his family. Teimuraz died as the shah's prisoner at Astarabad.
Kakheti annexed to Persia (1648–1664)
Regency of Shadiman Baratashvili (შადიმან ბარათაშვილი) (1606–1610)							He is known for his martyr's death at the hands of Abbas I of Persia. The Georgian Orthodox Church regards him as saint and marks his memory on the day of his death, July 1.
Luarsab II the Holy Martyr (ლუარსაბ II)		1592; Tbilisi; Son of George X and Tamar Lipartiani	7 September 1606 – 1 July 1615	Kingdom of Kartli	Makrine Saakadze no children	1 July 1615; Shiraz aged 22–23	He is known for his martyr's death at the hands of Abbas I of Persia. The Georgian Orthodox Church regards him as saint and marks his memory on the day of his death, July 1.
Overlordship of Abbas I of Persia (1615–1619)							Installed by Abbas I as a puppet king. His power was confined to Lower Kartli and largely relied on Persian forces. Considered as a renegade, he was despised by most of the kingdom's population and, in spite of the Persian presence, he was unable to control even seemingly loyal nobility.
Bagrat VII; Bagrat Khan (ბაგრატ VII, ბაგრატ-ხანი)		c. 1569; Son of David XI and Helen	1616 – 1619	Kingdom of Kartli	Anna of Kakheti two children	1619 aged 49–50	Installed by Abbas I as a puppet king. His power was confined to Lower Kartli and largely relied on Persian forces. Considered as a renegade, he was despised by most of the kingdom's population and, in spite of the Persian presence, he was unable to control even seemingly loyal nobility.
Overlordship of Abbas I of Persia (1619–1629) and Safi of Persia (1629–1630); Regency of Giorgi Saakadze (გიორგი სააკაძე) (1619–1625)							Largely unpopular with his Christian subjects, Simon's "khanate" never stretched beyond Tbilisi and the Lower Kartli province, where the districts of Somkhiti and Sabaratiano were occupied by Persian forces.
Simon II; Semayun Khan (სიმონ II სიმონ-ხანი)		c. 1608; Son of Bagrat VII and Anna of Kakheti	1619 – 1631	Kingdom of Kartli	Jahan Banu Begum one child	1631 aged 22–23	Largely unpopular with his Christian subjects, Simon's "khanate" never stretched beyond Tbilisi and the Lower Kartli province, where the districts of Somkhiti and Sabaratiano were occupied by Persian forces.
Kartli briefly annexed to Kakheti
Overlordship of Safi of Persia (1633–1642) and Abbas II of Persia (1642–1658)							Took control of Kartli and garrisoned all major fortresses with Persian forces, bringing them under his tight control. His willingness to cooperate with his suzerain won for Kartli a larger degree of autonomy. A period of relative peace and prosperity ensued, with the cities and towns being revived, many deserted areas repopulated and commerce flourished. Although Muslim, Rostom patronised Christian culture, albeit Islam and Persian habits predominating at his court. He ruthlessly crushed an opposition of local nobles.
Rostom; Rustam Khan (როსტომი, როსტომ ხანი)		1565; Isfahan; Son of David XI	1633 – 17 November 1658	Kingdom of Kartli	Ketevan Abashishvili; 1633 no children Mariam Dadiani; 1634 no children	17 November 1658; Tbilisi aged 92–93	
Alexander III (ალექსანდრე III)		c. 1600; Kutaisi; Son of George III and Tamar	1639 – 1 March 1660	Kingdom of Imereti	Tamar Gurieli; 1618 (annulled 1620) one children Nestan-Darejan of Kakheti; 14 May 1631 near Gori no children	1 March 1660; Kutaisi aged 50–51	Most of his reign was spent in the struggle against the powerful prince of Mingrelia, Levan II Dadiani, who refused to acknowledge the king of Imereti as his overlord, and aspired to displace him from his throne.
Overlordship of Abbas II of Persia (1658–1666) and Suleiman I of Persia (1666–1675)							Originally great-great-grandson of Constantine II of Georgia, he came from the Mukhrani line, being adopted by his predecessor Rostom to succeed him. Followed the policy of his predecessor, managing to maintain a peaceful relationship with his Persian suzerains and to revive the economy of Kartli. Made efforts to bring other Georgian polities under his control.
Vakhtang V Shah-Navaz Khan (ვახტანგ V, შაჰნავაზი)		? Son of Teimuraz I, Prince of Mukhrani and Anna Eristavi; Adopted son of Rostom	17 November 1658 – 1676	Kingdom of Kartli	Rodam Qaplanishvili-Orbeliani (annulled 1658) ten children Mariam Dadiani; 1658 no children	1676 near Ganja Intervened in Imereti's bitter power struggles.	Originally great-great-grandson of Constantine II of Georgia, he came from the Mukhrani line, being adopted by his predecessor Rostom to succeed him. Followed the policy of his predecessor, managing to maintain a peaceful relationship with his Persian suzerains and to revive the economy of Kartli. Made efforts to bring other Georgian polities under his control.
Nestan-Darejan of Kakheti (ნესტან-დარეჯანი)		? Gremi; Daughter of Teimuraz I of Kakheti and Khoreshan	1 March 1660 – 1668	Kingdom of Imereti	Zurab, Duke of Aragvi; 1623 no children Alexander III; 14 May 1631 near Gori no children Vakhtang Tchutchunashvili; 1660 no children	1668; Kutaisi	After Alexander III's death, Darejan, as his widow, became the core of power in Imereti. Signed royal documents before her stepson (king Bagrat V) himself, and eventually blinded him shortly after his accession. Her third marriage to legitimized him in power, opposing Bagrat V: Vakhtang Tchutchunashvili (ვახტანგ ჭუჭუნაშვილი), puppet king of Nestan-Darejan, ruled briefly in 1660 and 1668.; Demetrius Gurieli (დემეტრე გურიელი), ruled briefly in 1663–1664; the Imeretians deposed and blinded him, and restored Bagrat V. The period was marked by extreme instability and feudal anarchy in the kingdom: some other nobles tried to wrest for power.
Bagrat V (ბაგრატ V)		1620; Son of Alexander III and Tamar Gurieli	1 March 1660 – 1661 (Note: Deposed by the puppet king of his stepmother in 1660 and 1668.) 1664 – 1678 1679 – 1681	Kingdom of Imereti	Ketevan of Kakheti (annulled 1661) no children Tatia of Mukhrani (annulled 1663) no children Tamar of Mukhrani; 1663 three children	1681 aged 60/61	
Ketevan (ქეთევანი)		1648; Daughter of Prince David of Kakheti and Elene Diasamidze	1664 – 1675	Kingdom of Kakheti	Archil II; 1668 four children	16 April 1719; Moscow aged 70–71	With Kakheti's independence restored, Archil was designated its king after marrying the later king's granddaughter, Ketevan. Ketevan's brother, Heraclius, came in 1675 to claim and inherit the throne. Dispossessed, Archil tried to expand his influence in Imereti through a series of unsuccessful or short-lived coups d'état on that kingdom. Eventually, Archil retired to Russia where he spearheaded the cultural life of a local Georgian community. He was also a lyric poet.
Archil II (არჩილ II)		1647; First son of Vakhtang V and Rodam Qaplanishvili-Orbeliani	1664 – 1675	Kingdom of Kakheti	Unknown (daughter of Prince Nodar Tsitsishvili) no children Ketevan; 1668 four children	16 April 1713; Moscow aged 65–66	With Kakheti's independence restored, Archil was designated its king after marrying the later king's granddaughter, Ketevan. Ketevan's brother, Heraclius, came in 1675 to claim and inherit the throne. Dispossessed, Archil tried to expand his influence in Imereti through a series of unsuccessful or short-lived coups d'état on that kingdom. Eventually, Archil retired to Russia where he spearheaded the cultural life of a local Georgian community. He was also a lyric poet.
Archil II (არჩილ II)		1647; First son of Vakhtang V and Rodam Qaplanishvili-Orbeliani	1661 – 1663 1678 – 1679 1690 – 1691 1695 – 1696 1698 – 1699	Kingdom of Imereti	Unknown (daughter of Prince Nodar Tsitsishvili) no children Ketevan; 1668 four children	16 April 1713; Moscow aged 65–66	With Kakheti's independence restored, Archil was designated its king after marrying the later king's granddaughter, Ketevan. Ketevan's brother, Heraclius, came in 1675 to claim and inherit the throne. Dispossessed, Archil tried to expand his influence in Imereti through a series of unsuccessful or short-lived coups d'état on that kingdom. Eventually, Archil retired to Russia where he spearheaded the cultural life of a local Georgian community. He was also a lyric poet.
Overlordship of Suleiman I of Persia (1675–1694) and Soltan Hoseyn of Persia (1694–1709)							He is best known for his struggle against the Persians which dominated his weakened kingdom and later as a Persian commander-in-chief in what is now Afghanistan. Being an Eastern Orthodox Christian, he converted to Shia Islam prior to his appointment as governor of Kandahar.
George XI; Shah Navaz Khan II; Gurgin Khan (გიორგი XI, შაჰნავაზ II გურგინ-ხანი)		? Second son of Vakhtang V and Rodam Qaplanishvili-Orbeliani	1676 – 1688 1703 – 21 April 1709	Kingdom of Kartli	Tamar Davitishvili (d. 4 December 1683); 1676 two children Khoreshan Mikeladze (d. 24 February 1695); 1687; Kojori one child	21 April 1709; Kandahar	He is best known for his struggle against the Persians which dominated his weakened kingdom and later as a Persian commander-in-chief in what is now Afghanistan. Being an Eastern Orthodox Christian, he converted to Shia Islam prior to his appointment as governor of Kandahar.
Overlordship of Suleiman I of Persia (1675–1694) and Soltan Hoseyn of Persia (1694–1709)							Grandson of Teimuraz I of Kakheti. Raised in Russia, where he was known as Nikolai Davidovich. In 1662, he returned to take the vacant throne of Kakheti, but was defeated by his brother-in-law Archil with Persian support. He managed to take Kakheti when Archil, conflicted with the Persian Empire, left the kingdom. With the annexation of his kingdom to Persia, Heraclius filled the Kartli throne, left vacant by George XI's deposition.
Heraclius I Eregli Khan; Nazar Ali Khan (ერეკლე I, ნაზარალი-ხანი)		1643; Tbilisi; Son of Prince David of Kakheti and Helen Diasamidze	1675 – 1676 1703 – 1709	Kingdom of Kakheti	Anna Cholokashvili; 1677; Ispahan five children	1709; Isfahan aged 66–67	Grandson of Teimuraz I of Kakheti. Raised in Russia, where he was known as Nikolai Davidovich. In 1662, he returned to take the vacant throne of Kakheti, but was defeated by his brother-in-law Archil with Persian support. He managed to take Kakheti when Archil, conflicted with the Persian Empire, left the kingdom. With the annexation of his kingdom to Persia, Heraclius filled the Kartli throne, left vacant by George XI's deposition.
Heraclius I Eregli Khan; Nazar Ali Khan (ერეკლე I, ნაზარალი-ხანი)		1643; Tbilisi; Son of Prince David of Kakheti and Helen Diasamidze	1688 – 1703	Kingdom of Kartli	Anna Cholokashvili; 1677; Ispahan five children	1709; Isfahan aged 66–67	Grandson of Teimuraz I of Kakheti. Raised in Russia, where he was known as Nikolai Davidovich. In 1662, he returned to take the vacant throne of Kakheti, but was defeated by his brother-in-law Archil with Persian support. He managed to take Kakheti when Archil, conflicted with the Persian Empire, left the kingdom. With the annexation of his kingdom to Persia, Heraclius filled the Kartli throne, left vacant by George XI's deposition.
Between 1676 and 1703, Kakheti was annexed to Persia
Tamar of Mukhrani (თამარი)		c. 1640; Daughter of Constantine I, Prince of Mukhrani and Darejan Abashidze	1681 – 1683	Kingdom of Imereti	Levan III Dadiani; 1661 three children Bagrat V 1663 four children George IV Gurieli; 1681 no children	1681 aged 40–41	Like her mother-in-law, Tamar also became the core of sovereignty in Imereti, as it is shown by her third husband succeeding her second one. This third husband, George Gurieli, was Prince of Guria in 1658–1668. He was energetically involved in civil wars in western Georgian polities, which he sought to bring under his sway. He was killed in battle while trying to recover the lost throne of Imereti.
George III Gurieli (გიორგი III გურიელი)		? Son of Kaikhosro I Gurieli and Khvaramze Goshadze	1681 – 1683	Kingdom of Imereti	Tamar Chijavadze; 1667 (annulled 1677) five children Darejan of Imereti c. 1677 no children Tamar of Mukhrani; 1681 no children	1684	Like her mother-in-law, Tamar also became the core of sovereignty in Imereti, as it is shown by her third husband succeeding her second one. This third husband, George Gurieli, was Prince of Guria in 1658–1668. He was energetically involved in civil wars in western Georgian polities, which he sought to bring under his sway. He was killed in battle while trying to recover the lost throne of Imereti.
Alexander IV (ალექსანდრე IV)		c. 1660? Kutaisi; Illegitimate son of Bagrat V	1683 – 1691 1691 – 1695	Kingdom of Imereti	Tamar Abashidze; 1691 four children	1695 aged 34–35?	George XI of Kartli and the Imeretian nobles secured the Ottoman recognition for Alexander, who was enthroned in Imereti after deposing the Gurieli prince in 1683. Alexander transferred his loyalty to Suleiman I of Persia in 1689, but was expelled by the Ottomans into Kartli in August 1690. In 1691, through the mediation of Erekle I of Kartli and the Persian government, Alexander was restored in Imereti after a year of anarchy and misrule.
Overlordship of Giorgi-Malakia Abashidze (1696–1698)							As usual for widows in Imereti, she was the link between two kings, marrying them in succession. George V ruled virtually, under his powerful benefactor.
Tamar Abashidze (თამარი)		1681; Daughter of Giorgi-Malakia Abashidze	1696 – 1698	Kingdom of Imereti	Alexander IV; 1691 four children George IV Gochia; 1696 no children	c. 1707 aged 34–35	As usual for widows in Imereti, she was the link between two kings, marrying them in succession. George V ruled virtually, under his powerful benefactor.
George IV Gochia (გიორგი V გოჩია)		c. 1680? A relative of the Bagrationi dynasty	1696 – 1698	Kingdom of Imereti	Tamar Abashidze; 1696 no children	1698 aged 27–28?	As usual for widows in Imereti, she was the link between two kings, marrying them in succession. George V ruled virtually, under his powerful benefactor.
Overlordship of Giorgi-Malakia Abashidze (1699–1701)							Sister of Tamar Abashidze, she also married the next king of Imereti, an illegitimate son of her sister's husband, Simon, who was brought up in the court of Erekle I of Kartli. The couple was expelled by Giorgi-Malakia Abashidze and his daughter Tamar.
Anika Abashidze		c. 1685; Daughter of Giorgi-Malakia Abashidze	1698 – 1701	Kingdom of Imereti	1698 no children	1731 aged 34–35	Sister of Tamar Abashidze, she also married the next king of Imereti, an illegitimate son of her sister's husband, Simon, who was brought up in the court of Erekle I of Kartli. The couple was expelled by Giorgi-Malakia Abashidze and his daughter Tamar.
Simon (სიმონი)		? Illegitimate son of Alexander IV	1698 – 1701	Kingdom of Imereti	1698 no children	1701	Sister of Tamar Abashidze, she also married the next king of Imereti, an illegitimate son of her sister's husband, Simon, who was brought up in the court of Erekle I of Kartli. The couple was expelled by Giorgi-Malakia Abashidze and his daughter Tamar.
Overlordship of Giorgi-Malakia Abashidze (1701–1702)							Third daughter of the powerful regent Giorgi Abashidze, married Mamia Gurieli, who succeeded Elena's brother-in-law. After his first reign as king for a year, Mamia abdicated, being unable to tolerate the influence of his father-in-law Giorgi-Malakia Abashidze. Subsequent periods of his royal career was the result of a feud with George VII of Imereti. Mamia died while still sitting on the throne of Imereti, which then reverted to his rival.
Elena Abashidze		? Daughter of Giorgi-Malakia Abashidze	1701 – 1702	Kingdom of Imereti	Mamia Gurieli; 1698 (annulled 1711) seven children	1731 aged 34–35	Third daughter of the powerful regent Giorgi Abashidze, married Mamia Gurieli, who succeeded Elena's brother-in-law. After his first reign as king for a year, Mamia abdicated, being unable to tolerate the influence of his father-in-law Giorgi-Malakia Abashidze. Subsequent periods of his royal career was the result of a feud with George VII of Imereti. Mamia died while still sitting on the throne of Imereti, which then reverted to his rival.
Mamia III Gurieli (მამია III გურიელი დიდი)		? Son of George III Gurieli and Tamar Chijavadze	1701 – 1702 1711 – 1712 1713 – 5 January 1714	Kingdom of Imereti	Elena Abashidze; 1698 (annulled 1711) seven children Tamar of Racha; 1711 no children	5 January 1714	Third daughter of the powerful regent Giorgi Abashidze, married Mamia Gurieli, who succeeded Elena's brother-in-law. After his first reign as king for a year, Mamia abdicated, being unable to tolerate the influence of his father-in-law Giorgi-Malakia Abashidze. Subsequent periods of his royal career was the result of a feud with George VII of Imereti. Mamia died while still sitting on the throne of Imereti, which then reverted to his rival.
George V Abashidze (გიორგი-მალაქია აბაშიძე)		? Son of Paata Abashidze	1702 – 1707	Kingdom of Imereti	Unknown seven children	15 October 1722; Tbilisi	After controlling many kings behind the curtain, Giorgi-Malakia made his way to the throne, but ended up deposed by a revolt of the nobles.
George VI (გიორგი VII)		? Illegitimate son of Alexander IV	1703 – 1711 1712 – 1713 5 January 1714 – 1716 1719 – 22 February 1720	Kingdom of Imereti	Rodam of Kartli; 1703 (annulled 1712) five children Tamar of Racha; March 1714 no children Tamar Gurieli; 1716 three children	22 February 1720; Kutaisi aged 49–50	With the approval of the Ottoman government, a rightful king of Imereti by the loyal party of nobles in 1702, though it was not until 1707 that he was able to wrest the crown from the usurper Giorgi-Malakia Abashidze (George VI). Entered in a feud with Mamia Gurieli for the throne.
Overlordship of Soltan Hoseyn of Persia (1709–1711)							Paternal grandson of Vakhtang V. He reigned in absentia since he served during the whole of this period as a Persian commander-in-chief in what is now Afghanistan.
Kaikhosro (ქაიხოსრო)		1 January 1674; Tbilisi; First son of Prince Levan and Tuta Gurieli	21 April 1709 – 27 September 1711	Kingdom of Kartli	Ketevan (d. Moscow, 3 May 1730) four children	27 September 1711; Kandahar aged 37	Paternal grandson of Vakhtang V. He reigned in absentia since he served during the whole of this period as a Persian commander-in-chief in what is now Afghanistan.
Overlordship of Soltan Hoseyn of Persia (1709-1711)							Although a Muslim and a loyal vassal of the Persians, he failed to ensure his kingdom's security and most of his reign was marked by Lekianoba – incessant inroads by the Dagestani mountainous clansmen.
David II; Imam Quli Khan (დავით II, იმამყული-ხანი)		1678; Isfahan; Son of Heraclius I and Anna Cholokashvili	1703 – 2 November 1722	Kingdom of Kakheti	Yatri Jahan-Begum three children	2 November 1722; Magharo aged 44–45	Although a Muslim and a loyal vassal of the Persians, he failed to ensure his kingdom's security and most of his reign was marked by Lekianoba – incessant inroads by the Dagestani mountainous clansmen.
Interregnum: 1711–1714; Overlordship of Soltan Hoseyn of Persia; Regency of Prince Vakhtang
Overlordship of Soltan Hoseyn of Persia (1714–1722), Mahmud Hotak of Afghanistan (1722–1725) and Ashraf Hotak of Afghanistan (1725–1727)							Paternal grandsons of Vakhtang V. Jesse proved to be incompetent and addicted to alcohol. Unable to maintain order in his possessions, he was replaced, in June 1716, with his brother, Vakhtang, who had finally agreed to renounce Christianity. One of the most important and extraordinary statesman of early 18th-century Georgia, Vakhtang was known as a notable legislator, scholar, critic, translator and poet. His reign was eventually terminated by the Ottoman invasion following the disintegration of Safavid Persia, which forced Vakhtang into exile in the Russian Empire. After Ottoman invasion in Georgia that led to Vakhtang's escape, Jesse could return to the throne. After his death, the kingdom was abolished and united with Kakheti.
Jesse; Ali-Quli Khan; Mustafa Pasha (იესე)		1680/82; Tbilisi; Son of Prince Levan and Tinatin Avalishvili	1714 – 1716 July 1724 – 1727	Kingdom of Kartli	Mariam Qaplanishvili-Orbeliani; 1712 one child Elene-Begum of Kakheti; 1715 eleven children	1727; Tbilisi aged 57–58	
Vakhtang VI the Scholar; Ḥosaynqolī Khan (ვახტანგ VI)		15 September 1674; Tbilisi; Second son of Prince Levan and Tuta Gurieli	1716 – July 1724	Kingdom of Kartli	Rusudan of Circassia; 1696 five children	26 March 1737; Astrakhan aged 61	
In 1727, the kingdom of Kartli was annexed to the Ottoman Empire, then to Persia (1735), and finally merged in Kakheti in 1744
George IV Gurieli (გიორგი IV გურიელი)		? Son of Mamia and Khvaramze Goshadze	27 February – June 1720	Kingdom of Imereti	Elena-Mariam Abashidze (annulled 1717) two children Khvaramze Dadiani no children	1726	Also Prince of Guria 1714–1726. Seized the crown of Imereti, but was forced to abandon the enterprise later that year.
Alexander V (ალექსანდრე V)		1704; Kutaisi; Son of George VI and Rodam of Kartli	June 1720 – 1741 1742 – March 1752	Kingdom of Imereti	Mariam Dadiani (d. 1731); 1721 three children Tamar Abashidze (d. 1772); 1732 five children	March 1752; Kutaisi aged 49–50	Brought up at the court of his relative Vakhtang VI of Kartli and enjoyed his support in the power struggle in Imereti. After visiting Istanbul, in August 1719 he returned with a detachment of Ottoman auxiliaries, deposed George VIII Gurieli in June 1720, and was crowned king of Imereti. Had, however, opposition from his brother: Mamuka (მამუკა), rival king in 1746–1749, with the support of Otia Dadiani, Prince of Mingrelia, Zurab Abashidze and Grigol, Duke of Racha.
Overlordship of Mahmud Hotak of Afghanistan (1722–1725), Ashraf Hotak of Afghanistan (1725–1729) and Tahmasp II of Persia (1729–1732)							He frequently feuded with his western neighbor and kinsman, Vakhtang VI of Kartli, who was declared deposed by the Persian government in 1723.
Constantine II; Mahmad Quli Khan (კონსტანტინე II მაჰმად ყული-ხანი)		? Isfahan; Illegitimate son of Heraclius I	2 November 1722 – 28 December 1732	Kingdom of Kakheti	Perejan-Begum	28 December 1732; Telavi	He frequently feuded with his western neighbor and kinsman, Vakhtang VI of Kartli, who was declared deposed by the Persian government in 1723.
George VII (გიორგი VII)		1718; Kutaisi; Second son of George VI and Tamar Gurieli	1741	Kingdom of Imereti	Mzekhatun Lipartiani five children	1778; Kutaisi aged 59–60	After his brother Alexander V was ousted in the Ottoman-sponsored coup of 1741, he was enthroned in Imereti, but was deposed in the same year.
Overlordship of Nader Shah of Persia (1744–1746)							Married since 1712. In 1735, the couple fomented unrest against the Persian rule, but Teimuraz was captured in 1736. Part of Georgian nobles staged a powerful rebellion against the Persian regime, and the shah released Teimuraz to suppress the opposition. In 1744, Teimuraz was confirmed by the shah as king of Kartli, his wife recognized as "Queen of Queens", and their son Erekle was given a Kakhetian crown, laying the ground for the eventual reunification of the Georgian kingdoms. They were recognised as Christian kings for the first time since 1632, and crowned as so. With their power growing increasingly stronger, Teimuraz soon repudiated their allegiance to the Persian suzerain.
Tamar II (თამარი II)		1696; Daughter of Vakhtang VI and Rusudan of Circassia	1744 – 12 April 1746	Kingdom of Kartli	Teimuraz II; 2 February 1712 four children	12 April 1746; Kutaisi aged 59/60	
Teimuraz II (თეიმურაზ II)		1695; Tbilisi; Son of Heraclius I and Anna Cholokashvili	28 December 1732 – 1744	Kingdom of Kakheti	Daughter of Baadur, Duke of Aragvi (annulled 1711) no children Tamar II; 2 February 1712 seven children Ana-Khanum Baratashvili; 19 August 1746 four children	8 January 1762; Saint Petersburg aged 61	
Teimuraz II (თეიმურაზ II)		1695; Tbilisi; Son of Heraclius I and Anna Cholokashvili	1744 – 8 January 1762 (with Tamar II until 1746)	Kingdom of Kartli	Daughter of Baadur, Duke of Aragvi (annulled 1711) no children Tamar II; 2 February 1712 seven children Ana-Khanum Baratashvili; 19 August 1746 four children	8 January 1762; Saint Petersburg aged 61	
The process of unification of Kartli and Kakheti was initiated in 1744, when Teimuraz II was confirmed as King of Kartli by the Persians, and left Kakheti to his son Heraclius II. It was fulfilled in 1762, when Teimuraz II died, and Heraclius merged the two crowns. The Russian southward expansion would however cut short this evolution; Kartli-Kakheti became a Russian protectorate in 1783 by the Treaty of Georgievsk, and was annexed in 1801 following the death of George XII. Imereti kept its independence a few years longer, until 1810.
Heraclius II (ერეკლე II)		7 November 1720; Telavi; Son of Teimuraz II and Tamar II	1744 – 11 January 1798	Kingdom of Kakheti (until 8 January 1762) Kingdom of Kartli-Kakheti (since 8 January 1762)	Ketevan Pkheidze; 1740 two children Anna Abashidze; 1745 three children Darejan Dadiani; 1750 twenty-three children	11 January 1798; Telavi aged 77	Definitely merged Kartli with Kakheti after his father's death. His reign is regarded as the swan song of the Georgian monarchy. Aided by his personal abilities and the unrest in the Persian Empire, Heraclius established himself as a de facto autonomous ruler, unified eastern Georgia politically for the first time in three centuries, and attempted to modernize the government, economics, and military. Overwhelmed by the internal and external menaces to Georgia's precarious independence, he placed his kingdom under the formal Russian protection in 1783, but the move didn't prevent the invasion of Georgia from being devastated by the Persian invasion in 1795.
Solomon I the Great (სოლომონ I დიდი)		1735; Kutaisi; Son of Alexander V and Tamar Abashidze	March 1752 – 23 April 1784	Kingdom of Imereti	Tinatin Sharvashidze one child Mariam Dadiani (d. 1778) three children Gulkan Tsulukidze (1730–1800) no children	23 April 1784; Kutaisi aged 48–49	Had opposition from his cousin: Teimuraz (თეიმურაზი), son of Mamuka, ruled against Solomon between 1766 and 1768, with support from the Ottoman Empire.
David II (დავით II)		1755; Kutaisi; Son of George VII and Mzekhatun Lipartiani	4 May 1784 – 1791	Kingdom of Imereti	Ana Orbeliani c. 1780 four children	11 January 1795; Akhaltsikhe aged 38–39	After the death of his cousin, King Solomon I, he became a regent but prevented the rival princes David (the future king Solomon II) and George from being crowned. With the support of Katsia II Dadiani, prince of Mingrelia, he seized the throne and proclaimed himself king on May 4, 1784. Had opposition, in 1789, from a cousin, Prince Solomon, who would eventually succeeded him after ousting him in 1791.
George XII (გიორგი XII)		10 November 1746; Telavi; Son of Heraclius II and Anna Abashidze	11 January 1798 – 28 December 1800	Kingdom of Kartli-Kakheti	Ketevan Andronikashvili; 1766 twelve children Mariam Tsitsishvili; 13 July 1783 eleven children	28 December 1800; Tbilisi aged 54	His brief reign in the closing years of the 18th century was marked by significant political instability, which implied the near certainty of a civil strife and a Persian invasion. Weakened by poor health and overwhelmed by problems in his realm, George renewed a request of protection from Tsar Paul I of Russia. After his death, Imperial Russia took advantage of the moment and moved to annex the Georgian kingdoms, while sending the remnants of the Georgian royal family into forced exile in Russia.
In 1801, the Kingdom of Kartli-Kakheti was annexed by Russia
Solomon II (სოლომონ II)		1772; Kutaisi; Son of Prince Archil and Princess Helen of Georgia	1791 – 1810	Kingdom of Imereti	Mariam Dadiani; 1791 no children	7 February 1815; Trabzon aged 42–43	Grandson of Alexander V. Initially prevented of the succession by his regent, he managed to overthrow him twice. Ruled under threat of Russian annexation, made even more present after the Kakheti-Kartli conquest in 1800. This became an official act with his deposition by the Imperial Russian government in 1810.
In 1810, the Kingdom of Imereti was annexed by Russia

=== Bagrationi today ===
Many members of the Bagrationi dynasty were forced to flee the country and live in exile after the Red Army took control of the short-lived Democratic Republic of Georgia in 1921 and installed the Georgian Communist Party. Since Georgia regained independence in 1990 the dynasty have raised their profile, and in 2008 the two rival branches were united by marriage of the House of Mukhrani pretender David Bagration of Mukhrani and Ana Bagration-Gruzinsky, the eldest daughter of the Gruzinsky pretender Nugzar Bagration-Gruzinsky. The marriage ended in divorce in 2013, but produced a son named Giorgi. On 1 March 2025 Prince Nugzar died, the Gruzinski line went extinct in the male line and Ana became the rival pretender to her ex-husband with Giorgi as their shared heir apparent (his only child and her only son).

== Timeline ==
Pharnavazid
Artaxiad
Arsacid
Chosroid
Chosroid, Guaramid and Nersianid (Note: ruled as demoted princes)
Bagrationi
│
−302
│
−202
│
−102
│
−2
│
98
│
198
│
298
│
398
│
498
│
598
│
698
│
798
│
898
│
998
│
1098
│
1198
│
1298
│
1398
│
1498
│
1598
│
1698
│
1798
│
1898
│
1998
Monarchs of Georgia, 302 BC–1810

== See also ==
- Unification of the Georgian realm
- Collapse of the Georgian realm
- Monarchism in Georgia
