= List of mothers to monarchs of Georgia =

List of mothers to Georgian monarchs

This list includes the biological mothers of the Georgian monarchs.

== Mothers of the monarchs of the Kingdom of Iberia (302 BC–580) ==
Mother	Monarch	Ethnicity	Place of origin
daughter of Darius III?	Pharnavaz I	Persian	Isfahan
-	Sauromaces I	Durdzuk	North Caucasus
-	Pharnajom	Georgian	Kingdom of Iberia
-	Artoces	Georgian	Kingdom of Iberia
-	Arshak II	Georgian, Armenian or Parthian	-
-	Pharasmanes I	Georgian	Kingdom of Iberia
daughter of Tigranes IV	Mihrdat I	Armenian	Kingdom of Armenia
Ghadana	Ghadam	Parthian	Parthian Empire
-	Rev I	Georgian	Kingdom of Iberia
Sephelia	Vache	Greek	-
Nana	Rev II	Greek	Bosporan Kingdom
Nana	Aspacures II	Greek	Bosporan Kingdom
Salome	Sauromaces II	Armenian	Kingdom of Armenia
Salome	Trdat	Armenian	Kingdom of Armenia
-	Pharasmanes IV	Georgian	Kingdom of Iberia
-	Mihrdat IV	Georgian	Kingdom of Iberia
Maria	Mihrdat V	Greek	Roman Empire
Sagdukht	Vakhtang I	Persian	Gardman
Balendukht	Dachi	Persian	Sasanian Empire

== Mothers of the monarchs of the Principality of Iberia (580–1008) ==
Mother	Monarch	Ethnicity	Place of origin
Kamsarakan woman	Stephen	Armenian	-
daughter of Mirian of Kakheti	Adarnase III	Georgian	Principality of Iberia
-	Nerse	Georgian	Principality of Iberia
daughter of Adarnase III of Iberia	Stephen III	Georgian	Principality of Iberia
daughter of Guaram III of Iberia	Ioane	Georgian	Principality of Iberia
daughter of Guaram III of Iberia	Juansher	Georgian	Principality of Iberia
daughter of Nerse of Iberia	Ashot I	Georgian	Principality of Iberia
daughter of Smbat VIII Bagratuni	David I	Armenian	Arminiya

== Mothers of the monarchs of the Kingdom of Georgia (1008–1490) ==
Mother	Monarch	Ethnicity	Place of origin
Gurandukht of Abkhazia	Bagrat III	Georgian	Kingdom of Abkhazia
Martha	George I	-	-
Mariam of Vaspurakan	Bagrat IV	Armenian	Kingdom of Vaspurakan
Borena of Alania	George II	Alan	Alania
Elene	David IV	-	-
Rusudan	Demetrius I	Armenian	-
Burdukhan of Alania	Tamar	Alan	Alania
Tamar	George IV	Georgian	Kingdom of Georgia
Tamar	Rusudan	Georgian	Kingdom of Georgia
Rusudan	David VI	Georgian	Kingdom of Georgia
Tamar Amanelisdze	Constantine I	Georgian	Kingdom of Georgia
Tamar Amanelisdze	Michael	Georgian	Kingdom of Georgia
Tamar Amanelisdze	Vakhtang II	Georgian	Kingdom of Georgia
-	David VII	Georgian	Velistsikhe, Kingdom of Georgia
Gvantsa Kakhaberidze	Demetrius II	Georgian	Duchy of Racha; Kingdom of Georgia
-	David VIII	Greek	Empire of Trebizond
-	Vakhtang III	Greek	Empire of Trebizond
Natela Jaqeli	George V	Georgian	Principality of Meskheti
Sindukhtar Jaqeli	Bagrat V	Georgian	Principality of Meskheti
Helena Megale Komnene	George VII	Greek	Empire of Trebizond
Anna of Trebizond	Constantine I	Greek	Empire of Trebizond
Natia Amirejibi	Alexander I	Georgian	Kingdom of Georgia
Dulandukht Orbelyan	Vakhtang IV	Armenian	Syunik
Tamar Bagrationi	George VIII	Georgian	Kingdom of Imereti
Gulashar-Gulkhan Bagrationi	Bagrat VI	Georgian	Kingdom of Imereti
Gulashar-Gulkhan Bagrationi	Constantine II	Georgian	Kingdom of Imereti

== Mothers of the monarchs of the Kingdom of Kartli (1484–1762) ==
Mother	Monarch	Ethnicity	Place of origin
Tamar	David X	Georgian	-
Tamar	George IX	Georgian	-
Tamar Jaqeli	Luarsab I	Georgian	Principality of Meskheti
Tamar of Imereti	Simon I	Georgian	Kingdom of Imereti
Tamar of Imereti	David XI	Georgian	Kingdom of Imereti
Nestan-Darejan of Kakheti	George X	Georgian	Kingdom of Kakheti
Tamar Lipartiani	Luarsab II	Georgian	Principality of Mingrelia
Elene	Bagrat VII	Georgian	Kingdom of Kakheti
Ana Bagrationi	Simon II	Georgian	Kingdom of Kakheti
Ana Sidamon-Eristavi	Vakhtang V	Georgian	Duchy of Aragvi
Rodam Qaplanishvili-Orbeliani	George XI	Georgian	Kingdom of Kartli
Tuta Gurieli	Kaikhosro	Georgian	Principality of Guria
Tuta Gurieli	Vakhtang VI	Georgian	Principality of Guria
Tinatin Avalishvili	Jesse	Georgian	Tori
Rusudan of Circassia	Tamar	Circassian	Circassia

== Mothers of the monarchs of the Kingdom of Kakheti (1490–1762) ==
Mother	Monarch	Ethnicity	Place of origin
Nestan-Darejan Bagrationi	Alexander I	Georgian	Kingdom of Georgia
Ana Cholokashvili	George II	Georgian	Kingdom of Kakheti
Elene Irubakidze-Cholokashvili	Levan	Georgian	Kingdom of Kakheti
Tinatin Gurieli	Alexander II	Georgian	Principality of Guria
Tinatin Amilakhvari	David I	Georgian	Kingdom of Kartli
Tinatin Amilakhvari	Constantine I	Georgian	Kingdom of Kartli
Ketevan the Martyr	Teimuraz I	Georgian	Mukhrani
Elene Diasamidze	Heraclius I	Georgian	-
Ana Cholokashvili	David II	Georgian	Kingdom of Kakheti
Ana Cholokashvili	Teimuraz II	Georgian	Kingdom of Kakheti
Tamar of Kartli	Heraclius II	Georgian	Kingdom of Kartli

== Mothers of the monarchs of the Kingdom of Kartli-Kakheti (1762–1801) ==
Mother	Monarch	Ethnicity	Place of origin
Tamar of Kartli	Heraclius II	Georgian	Kingdom of Kartli
Anna Abashidze	George XII	Georgian	Kingdom of Imereti

== Mothers of the monarchs of the Kingdom of Imereti (1490−1810) ==
Mother	Monarch	Ethnicity	Place of origin
Elene	Alexander II	Georgian	-
Tamar	Bagrat III	Georgian	-
Elene	George II	Georgian	-
Rusudan Sharvashidze	Levan	Georgian	-
Elene Gurieli	Rostom	Georgian	Principality of Guria
Elene Gurieli	George III	Georgian	Principality of Guria
Tamar	Alexander III	Georgian	-
Tamar Gurieli	Bagrat IV	Georgian	Principality of Guria
Rodam Kaplanishvili-Orbeliani	Archil II	Georgian	Kingdom of Kartli
Rodam of Kartli	Alexander V	Georgian	Kingdom of Kartli
Rodam of Kartli	Mamuka	Georgian	Kingdom of Kartli
Tamar Gurieli	George VII	Georgian	Principality of Guria
Tamar Abashidze	Solomon I	Georgian	Kingdom of Imereti
Darejan Dadiani	Teimuraz	Georgian	Principality of Mingrelia
Mzekhatun Lipartiani	David II	Georgian	-
Princess Elene of Georgia	Solomon II	Georgian	Kingdom of Kartli-Kakheti

== See also ==
- List of mothers of the Ottoman sultans
- List of mothers of the Safavid shahs
- List of mothers of the Mughal emperors
