= Guaram IV =

Guaram IV (Georgian: გუარამ IV), sometimes known as Gurgen, of the Guaramid dynasty, was a presiding prince of Iberia (Kartli, eastern Georgia) in 748. Son of Guaram III of Iberia.

Guaram IV succeeded his father Guaram III in 748 only as hereditary prince. He was not recognized as a prince-primate because the title was given by the Byzantine emperor to his father-in-law Adarnase III of Iberia instead, who was a member of the Nersianid dynasty. He had a son, Stephen III of Iberia. Guaram disappears on unknown date.

Preceded by Guaram III	Prince of Iberia; 748	Succeeded by Adarnase III
