= Ghias ad-Din =

King consort of Georgia c. 1223–1226

King consort of Georgia
- Tenure: c. 1223 – 1226
- Spouse: Rusudan of Georgia
- Issue: Tamar (Gurju Khatun); David VI
- Dynasty: Seljuk
- Father: Mugith al-Din Tughril Shah
- Religion: Sunni Islam later Georgian Orthodox Church

Ghias ad-din (Georgian: ღიას ად-დინი; fl. 1206–1226) was a member of the Seljuk dynasty of Rum and husband of Queen Rusudan of Georgia from c. 1223 to 1226.

A son of the emir of Erzurum Tughril ibn Kılıç Arslan II, he converted to Christianity on his father's order so as he could marry the queen of Georgia. Ghias ad-din's position at the Georgian court was weak and the spousal relationship was strained due to Rusudan's unfaithfulness. He shifted back and forth across the religious and political divide during the Khwarazmian invasion of Georgia in 1226. Around the same time, he was repudiated by Rusudan, and thereafter disappears from records, leaving two children behind, a daughter, Tamar, and a son, David.

== Origin and name ==
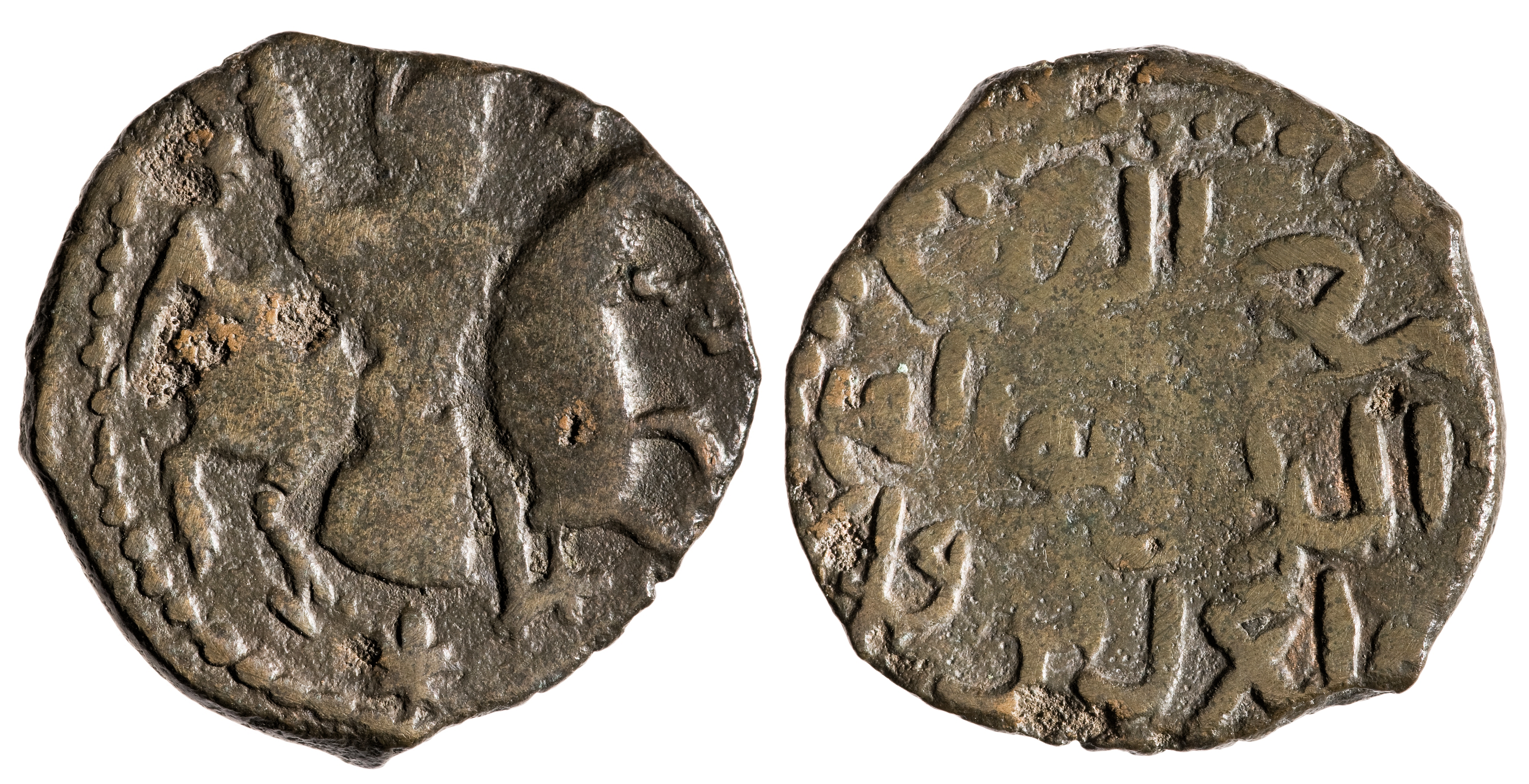
Coinage of Tughril Shah, the father of Ghias ad-Din, and Seljuk ruler of Erzurum.

The consort of Queen Rusudan was a younger son of Tughril ibn Kılıç Arslan II, the Seljuk emir of Erzurum, and his wife, a daughter of Sayf al-Din Begtimur, the ruler of Ahlat. Tughril Shah had received Elbistan in appanage upon the division of the sultanate of Rum by his father Kilij Arslan II in 1192, but he exchanged it, c. 1201, for Erzurum. He appears to have been a tributary to Georgia for at least parts of his reign.

The original name of Rusudan's consort is not recorded in either Georgian or Muslim sources. "Ghias ad-din" is a laqab reported by the 13th-century Egyptian scholar ibn 'Abd al-Zahir. The Georgian historian Prince Ioane, writing in the early 19th century, posits that Rusudan's husband was named Dimitri (Demetrius) upon his conversion to Christianity in Georgia.

== Marriage ==
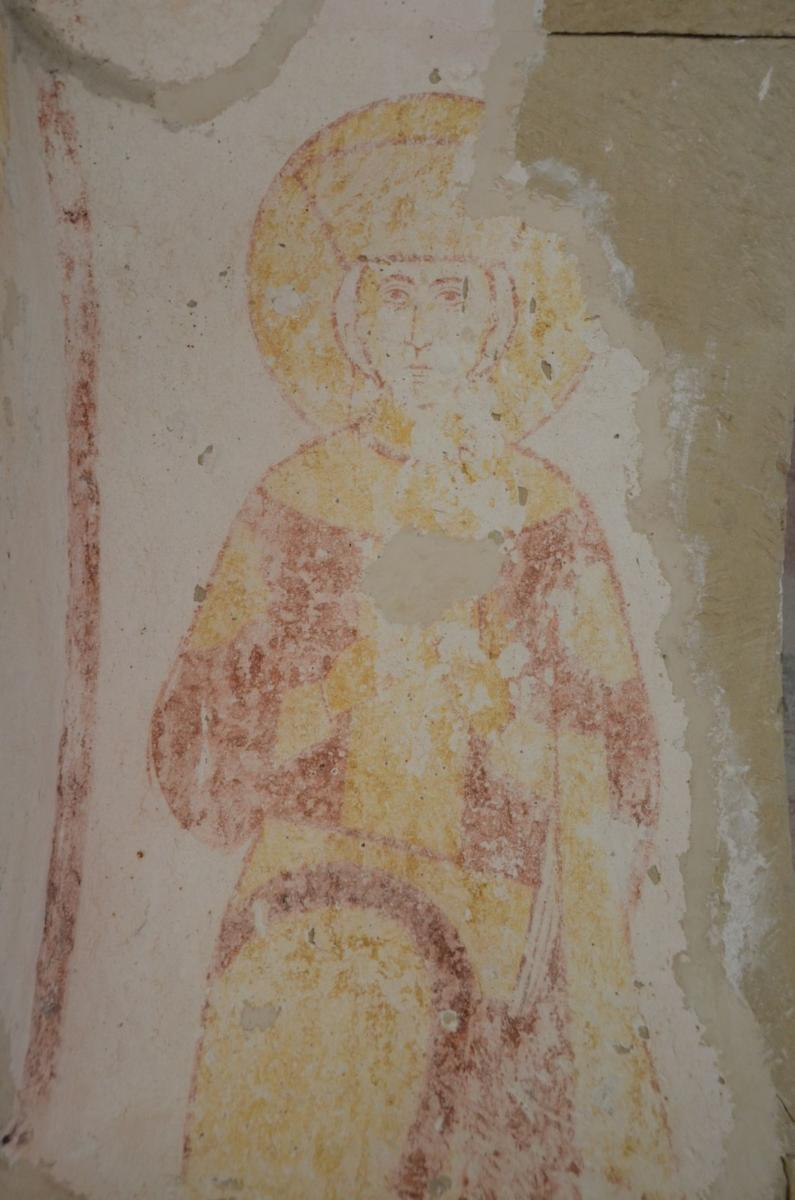
Fresco of Queen Rusudan

According to the Muslim sources, Rusudan married a son of the emir of Erzurum 620 AH (1223/1224 CE). The anonymous 14th-century Chronicle of a Hundred Years, part of the Georgian Chronicles, reports that the young Seljuk prince had been held at the Georgian court as a hostage in order to ensure the loyalty of Erzurum. Rusudan liked him and took him as a husband. The contemporary Arab scholar Abd al-Latif al-Baghdadi also confirms that it was Rusudan who opted for the Seljuk prince, but Ibn al-Athir states that the emir of Erzurum himself proposed the marriage in order to defend his country from the Georgian encroachments. After the Georgians rejected the emir's request on account of his being a Muslim, he ordered his son to convert to Christianity, the fact that is described by ibn al-Athir as "a strange turn of events without parallel".

== Marital life ==
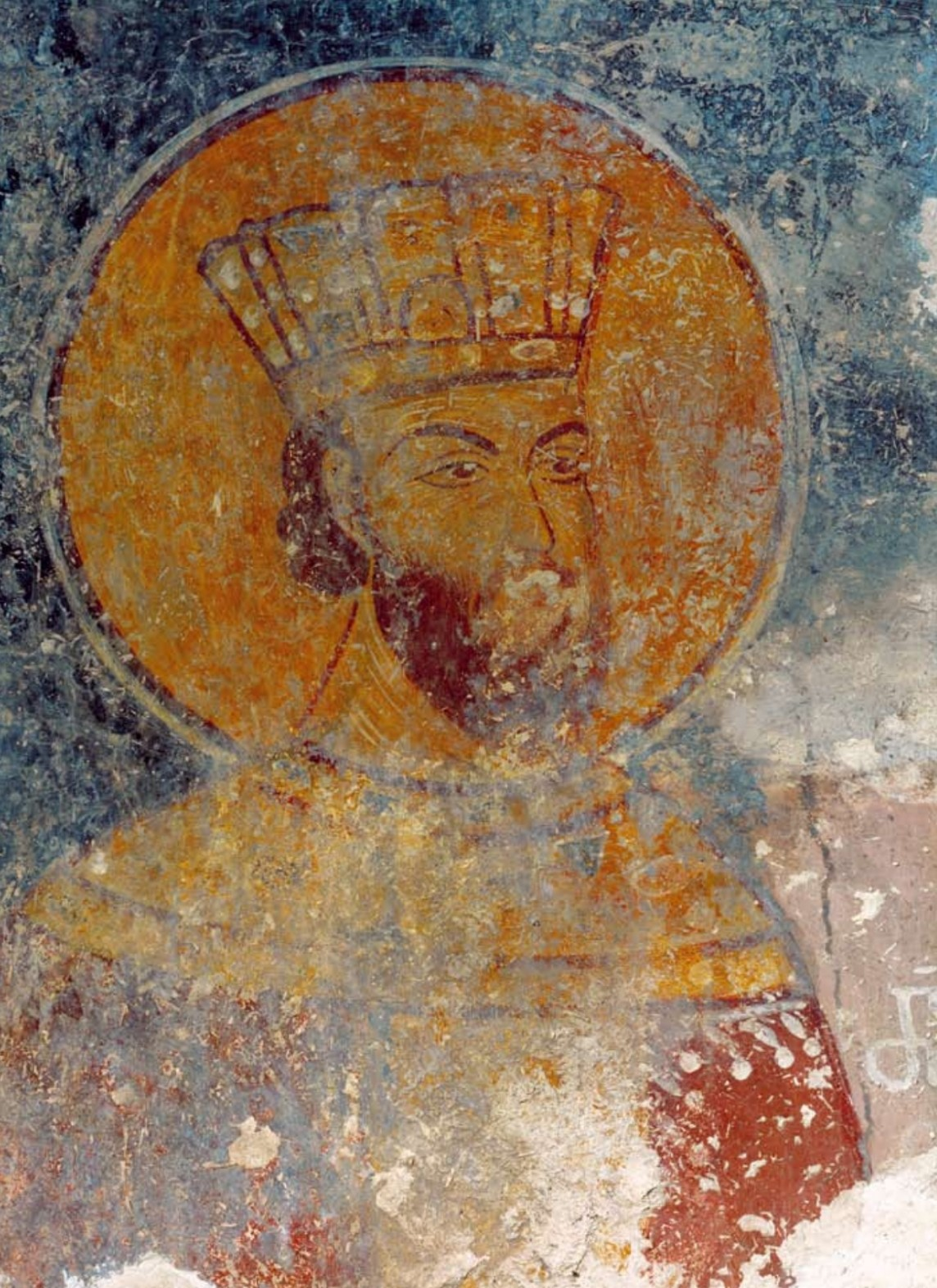
King David VI of Georgia was the son of Ghias ad-Din and Rusudan.

Ghias ad-din is reported by the Georgian annals to have been a handsome and physically strong man. Around 17 years old at the time of marriage, he was younger than Rusudan, who is unanimously described by the medieval sources as a beautiful woman devoted to pleasure. Reporting her scandalous love affairs and adulterous way of life, ibn al-Athir recounts that on one occasion Rusudan was surprised by her husband in bed in the arms of a slave ("mamluke"). As Ghias ad-din refused to condone this fact, ibn al-Athir continues, Rusudan had him moved to "another town" under strict supervision. The Muslim author underscores the "weak position" the Seljuk prince had at the Georgian court. Evidence suggests he was devoid of the high status and prestige enjoyed by earlier Georgian king-consorts, especially Rusudan's father David Soslan, the husband of Queen Tamar. The Georgian sources do not afford him the title of a king and do not report him being an army commander or otherwise involved in state affairs. His name does not appear on coins issued in the name of Rusudan.

Ghias ad-din and Rusudan had two children, a daughter, Tamar, and a son, David. Tamar married her cousin, Kaykhusraw II, sultan of Rum, and became better known by her sobriquet Gurju Khatun. David became the king of Georgia after Rusudan's death in 1245 and the forefather of the first dynasty of the Kingdom of Imereti in western Georgia.

== Defection ==
In 1226, when Jalal al-Din Mangburni, the shah of the Khwarazmian Empire, conquered the Georgian capital of Tbilisi, putting Queen Rusudan into flight to her western dominions, Ghias ad-Din reconverted to Islam and, according to the chronicler al-Nasawi, obtained aman (security) from Jalal ad-Din. However, after the Khwarezmid shah departed to lay siege to Ahlat, Ghias ad-Din returned to Christianity, redefected to the Georgians, and informed them about the weakness of a Khwarazmian garrison in Tbilisi. Rusudan seems to have repudiated the marriage with Ghias ad-Din around the same time, and he becomes unheard of thereafter.

== Notes ==
Royal titles
Preceded by David Soslan	King consort of Georgia; 1223/23–c. 1226	Succeeded by Tamar Amanelidze
