= Lists of monarchs of Georgia =

This article lists monarchs of Georgia, and includes monarchs of various Georgian kingdoms, principalities and duchies.

Georgian monarchs:

- List of monarchs of Georgia
- List of Georgian royal consorts
- List of mothers to monarchs of Georgia
- List of Georgian princes (mtavars)
- List of Georgian dukes (eristavs)
- List of monarchs of Kakheti and Hereti
- Style of the Georgian sovereign

Family trees of Georgian monarchs

- Georgian monarchs family tree from antiquity to united Georgia
  - Georgian monarchs family tree of Bagrationi dynasty of Kartli
  - Georgian monarchs family tree of Bagrationi dynasty of Kakheti
  - Georgian monarchs family tree of Bagrationi dynasty of Imereti
