= Adarnase III =

Adarnase III may refer to:

- Adarnase III of Iberia (ruled c. 748 to 760)
- Adarnase III of Tao (died 896)
