= Nersianid dynasty =

The Nersianids (Nersiani; Georgian: ნერსიანი) were an early medieval Georgian princely family. Appearing in the late fifth century, in the reign of King Vakhtang I of Iberia (c. 447–522), they figure in the eighth as dukes of Inner Iberia and twice attained, in the persons of Adarnase III and his son Nerse, to the office of Presiding Prince (erismtavari) of Iberia between c. 748 and 779/80. The first occupant of this office, Adarnase, held, in addition, the high Byzantine title of curopalates.

The family was related to another leading Georgian princely family, the Guaramids, through the marriage of the Guaramid Guaram III’s son to a daughter of Adarnase III. The second Nersianid ruling prince Nerse was dispossessed by the Abbasid Caliphate and his office was given to his nephew (sister's son) Stephanus III (r. 779/780-786).
