= Luarsab II =

King of Kartli from 1606 to 1615

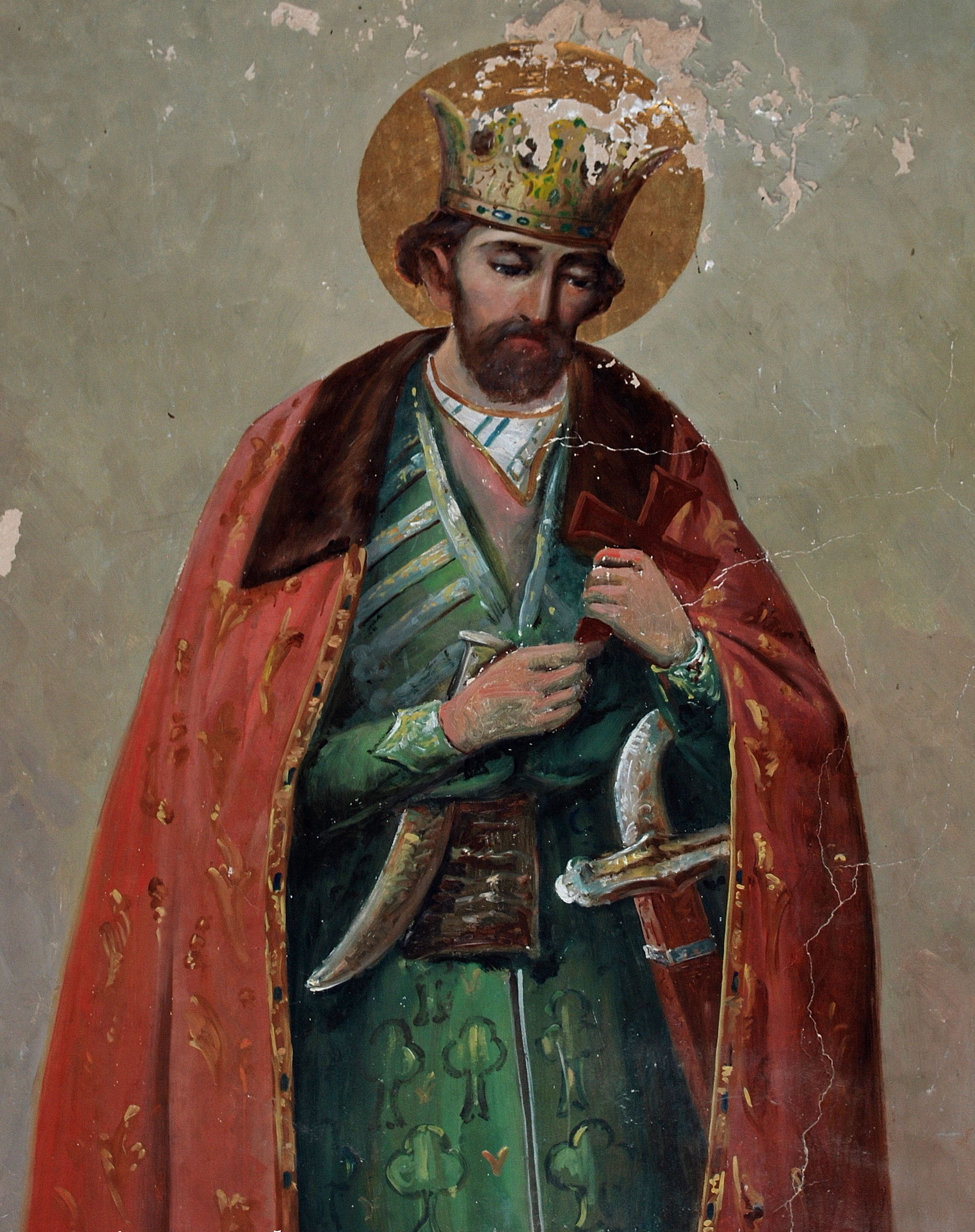
- Fresco of Luarsab II at the Shio-Mghvime Monastery.

King of Kartli
- Reign: 1606–1615
- Predecessor: George X
- Successor: Bagrat VII
- Born: 1592
- Died: 21 June (O.S.), 1 July (N.S.), 1622
- Spouse: Makrine Saakadze (m. 1611; div. 1611)
- Dynasty: Bagrationi
- Father: George X
- Mother: Tamar Lipartiani
- Religion: Georgian Orthodox Church
- Khelrtva

Saint Luarsab
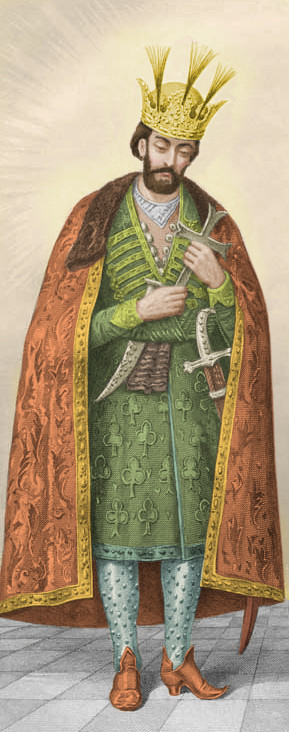
- Icon of Luarsab the Martyr

Holy Martyr
- Died: 1 July 1622
- Venerated in: Eastern Orthodox Church
- Feast: 1 July [O.S. 21 June]

Luarsab II the Holy Martyr (Georgian: ლუარსაბ II; 1592 – 21 June (O.S.), 1 July (N.S.), 1622) was a Georgian monarch who reigned as king (mepe) of Kartli (eastern Georgia) from 1606 to 1615. He was a member of the Bagrationi dynasty.

Faced at various points with the powerful Ottoman and Persian empires, Luarsab ended up in exile with family relatives in Western Georgia. After the Persian shah Abbas I promised peace in return for Luarsab's surrender, the young king agreed with the hope of saving his kingdom from complete destruction. Although the Georgians attempted to free Luarsab from Persian captivity through the mediation of Tsar Michael of Russia, the negotiations yielded no results. After refusing to convert to Islam, the incarcerated Luarsab was executed on the orders of the shah in 1622. The Georgian Orthodox Church declared the martyred king a saint and celebrates his memory on July 1, the day of his death.

== Life ==
Luarsab ascended the Kartlian throne at the age of 14 after his father, George X, suddenly died in 1606. His mother was Princess Tamar Lipartiani, member of the collateral branch of the House of Dadiani. During his minority, the government was actually run by his royal tutor Shadiman Baratashvili. When Shah Abbas I succeeded in driving the Ottoman armies out of eastern Georgia, leaving a Persian force in Tbilisi, he confirmed Luarsab as king of Kartli. The Ottomans attempted to remove Luarsab, sending a large army to Georgia, which was destroyed by the Georgian general Giorgi Saakadze at the Battle of Tashiskari in 1609. After this victory, Luarsab was again granted control of the citadel of Tbilisi. In 1610, the shah married his sister Tinatin. In late 1611, Luarsab married Makrine Saakadze, the sister of Giorgi Saakadze, who was a lower-class noble. The great nobles of the realm led by Shadiman Baratashvili convinced the king that Saakadze was a Persian agent seeking a royal crown. They induced Luarsab to divorce Makrine and forced Saakadze into exile to Persia.

Shah Abbas demanded more loyalty and obedience from the Georgians and encouraged a khan of Kazakh Mohammad to trouble the Kartlian lands. In 1612, Luarsab had Mohammad Khan assassinated and allied with another Georgian monarch, Teimuraz I of Kakheti, to counter an anticipated Persian aggression. Early in 1614, a large Persian army invaded Kakheti, destroying several settlements on its way, and moved into Kartli. Luarsab and Teimuraz fled to the western Georgian Kingdom of Imereti. George III of Imereti refused to surrender the refugees. Abbas threatened Kartli with ruin, promising that if Luarsab submitted, he would conclude a peace. In October 1615, Luarsab surrendered to save his kingdom from being wiped out, and, refusing to convert to Islam, was incarcerated first in Astarabad and then somewhere near Shiraz. The Georgians attempted to free their king through the mediation of Tsar Mikhail I of Russia. However, the negotiations yielded no results and, in 1622, Luarsab was executed by strangling on the orders of the shah at the fortress of Qal‘eh-ye Golāb in southwest Iran.

Preceded by George X	King of Kartli; 1606–1615	Succeeded by Bagrat VII
