= Bagrat VII =

King of Kartli 1616–1619

King of Kartli
- Reign: 1616–1619
- Predecessor: Luarsab II
- Successor: Simon II
- Died: 1619; Bolnisi
- Spouse: Ana of Kakheti
- Issue: Simon II of Kartli
- Dynasty: Bagrationi
- Father: David XI
- Mother: Helen
- Religion: Shia Islam (formerly Georgian Orthodox Church)
- Khelrtva

Bagrat VII (Georgian: ბაგრატ VII; died 1619), also known as Bagrat Khan, was king (mepe) of Kartli, eastern Georgia, effectively serving as a khan for the Persian shah Abbas I from 1616 to 1619.

== Biography ==
Bagrat was the son of David XI of Kartli (Daud Khan) and his wife, Helen, a relative of King Alexander II of Kakheti. He took refuge in Persia after his father was dislodged by the Ottoman invasion in 1578. He was raised at the shah’s court in Isfahan, brought up Muslim and adopted Persian customs. Later, for his efforts, he was given a fiefdom in mainland Iran. Around the mid 1590s, he assisted Farhad Khan Qaramanlu in arranging a match for Abbas I with Tamar Amilakhori.

In 1616, he was installed by Abbas I as a puppet king/khan in Kartli on the deposition of his cousin, King Luarsab II. He exercised only a limited power confined to Lower Kartli and largely relied on Persian forces. Considered as a renegade, he was disgusted by most of the kingdom’s population and, in spite of the Persian presence, he was unable to control even seemingly loyal nobility. His short reign was spent mostly in the town of Bolnisi, where he died in 1619, to be succeeded by his son, Simon II (Semayun Khan). His half-brother Khosro was given his land in Iran.

== Family ==
Bagrat was married to Ana (died 1619), daughter of Alexander II of Kakheti. Their children were:

- Simon II of Kartli (died 1631), King of Kartli (r. 1619–1631).
- Pahrijan-Begum, who married Shah Abbas I;

== Sources ==
- Floor, Willem; Herzig, Edmund (2012). Iran and the World in the Safavid Age. I.B.Tauris. ISBN 978-1850439301.
- Mikaberidze, Alexander (2015). Historical Dictionary of Georgia (2 ed.). Rowman & Littlefield. ISBN 978-1442241466.
- Toumanoff, Cyril (1976). Manuel de Généalogie et de Chronologie pour l'histoire de la Caucasie chrétienne (Arménie, Géorgie, Albanie) [Manual of Genealogy and Chronology of Christian Caucasian History (Armenia, Georgia, Albania)] (in French). Rome: Edizioni Aquila.

Preceded by Luarsab II	King of Kartli; 1616–1619	Succeeded by Simon II
