= Nerse of Iberia =

Nerse (Georgian: ნერსე, also spelled Nerses), of the Nersianid family, was a ruling prince of Iberia (Kartli, eastern Georgia) from c. 760 to 772 and again from 775 to 779/80.

Nerse succeeded his father, Adarnase III, Curopalates of Iberia, and defied the Abbasid Caliphate's hegemony in Georgia. In 772, he was summoned by caliph al-Mansur to Baghdad and cast in prison. Released by Caliph al-Mahdi (r. 775–785), Nerse was restored in Iberia in 775, but he again had difficulties with the Arabs, and was forced to flee, through the Daryal Pass, to the Khazars. Received with honors, but unable to gain any substantial support there, Nerse moved to Abkhazia where his family had taken refuge. His office was given by the Caliph to his nephew (sister's son) Stephen III. Nerse reconciled with the accomplished fact and, with the Arab permission, returned to Iberia, retiring from politics. By 786, when his Christianized Arab servant, Abo, was martyred, Nerse had disappeared from history. Nerse had a daughter who married Adarnase I of Tao-Klarjeti.

Preceded by Adarnase III	Prince of Iberia c. 760–772, 775–779/80	Succeeded by Stephen III
