= Adarnase III of Iberia =

Adarnase III (Georgian: ადარნასე III), of the Nersianid Dynasty, was a presiding prince of Iberia (Kartli, eastern Georgia) from c. 748 to 760.

Adarnase was a son of Prince Nerse I Nersiani by his wife, third daughter of Mirian of Kakheti.

The name Adarnase derives from Middle Persian Ādurnarsēh, with the second component of the word (Nase) being the Georgian attestation of the Middle Persian name Narseh, which ultimately derives from Avestan nairyō.saŋya-. The Middle Persian name Narseh also exists in Georgian as Nerse. The name Ādurnarsēh appears in the Armenian language as Atrnerseh.

Originally a hereditary duke (eristavi) of Inner Iberia, he seems to have succeeded the Guaramid ruler Guaram III, whose son, Guaram IV was married to Adarnase's daughter. He was succeeded by his son, Nerse.

Adarnase's title of curopalates testifies to the degree of Byzantine influence in Georgia even though Iberia continued under the suzerainty of the Abbasid Caliphate.

Preceded by Guaram III	Prince of Iberia c. 748–760	Succeeded by Nerse
