= Guaram III =

Guaram III (Georgian: გუარამ III), of the Guaramid dynasty, was a presiding prince of Iberia (Kartli, eastern Georgia) from before 693 to c. 748.

Guaram III was bestowed with the Byzantine title of curopalates, and thus, must have succeeded his father or grandfather Guaram II shortly before 693, i.e., before the resurgent Umayyad Caliphate ousted the Byzantines from the Caucasus region.

The chronicle of Pseudo-Juansher, written around 800, also refers to the princes Mihr, Archil, and the sons of the latter – Iovane and Juansher – in this period. However, neither of these individuals were presiding princes of Iberia, but the provincial rulers of Kakheti in the east.

Guaram III had a son also called Guaram (or Gurgen), and two anonymous daughters, one of whom married the Chosroid prince Archil, and the other married the Bagratid prince Vasak. His son, Guaram/Gurgen was married to a Nersianid princess, daughter of Adarnase III, and fathered Stephen III.

Preceded by Guaram II	Prince of Iberia c. 693–748	Succeeded by Adarnase III
