= Shadiman Baratashvili =

Shadiman Baratashvili (Georgian: შადიმან ბარათაშვილი) was a political figure in Kingdom of Kartli at the end of the 16th and the beginning of the 17th centuries.

Shadiman was a royal tutor and actually ran the government during minority of Luarsab II. After the death of the latter's wife, the lords opposing Luarsab, led by Shadiman, managed to turn Luarsab against Giorgi Saakadze. Saakadze, who had been warned just in time, managed to escape to Persia in 1612.

== Sources ==
- Mikaberidze, Alexander (2015). Historical Dictionary of Georgia (2 ed.). Rowman & Littlefield. p. 577. ISBN 978-1442241466.
