= Guaramid dynasty =

Georgian noble family

The Guaramid dynasty or Guaramiani (Georgian: გუარამიანი) was the younger branch of the Chosroid royal house of Iberia (Kartli, eastern Georgia). They ruled Iberia as Grand dukes (erismtavari) in the periods of 588–627, 684–748, and 779/780–786, and three of them were bestowed with the dignity of curopalates by the Byzantine imperial court.

== History ==
This branch descended from Leo, son of the Iberian King Vakhtang I and his second wife, Helena, a relative of the Byzantine emperor (485/6). Leo and his brother Mihrdat were given the western portion of the Kingdom of Iberia, composed of the duchies of Klarjeti, Odzrkhe, and the western half of that of Tsunda, of which, however, they were soon deprived by the elder Chosroid line and left as Princes of Klarjeti and Javakheti. Beginning with Leo's son Guaram I (r. 588–c. 590), members of this house were Presiding Princes of Iberia in the years 588–627, 684–748, and 779/780–786. Three of them were bestowed with the dignity of curopalates by the Byzantine imperial court, a common honorific for friendly foreign rulers.

The Guaramids were related through marriage with the leading princely houses of Georgia – the Chosroids, Nersianids, and the Bagratids. In the latter case, the marriage of Guaram III (r. 779/780–786)'s daughter with the fugitive Bagratuni prince Vasak produced the new Bagrationi dynasty, which would later become the last and the most long-lasting ruling family of Georgia. The extinction of Guaramid line by the late 8th century allowed their Bagratid cousins to gather their inheritance in the former Guaramid estates once they themselves had come to power.

The tenth-century Georgian chronicler Sumbat Davitis-Dze in his History of the Bagratids erroneously (or purposefully) identified the Guaramids as essentially Bagratids who allegedly came from the Holy Land to settle in the Georgian lands; this version allowed Georgian Bagratids to claim descent from the biblical King David.

== Guaramid rulers of Iberia ==
- Guaram I (588–c. 590)
- Stephanus I (c. 590–627)
- Guaram II (684–c. 693)
- Guaram III (c. 693–c. 748)
- Guaram IV (748)
- Stephanus III (779/780–786)
