= Principality of Iberia =

Medieval aristocracy in the Georgian region of Kartli

Principality of Iberia ქართლის საერისმთავრო (Georgian)
- c. 588–888
- Flag

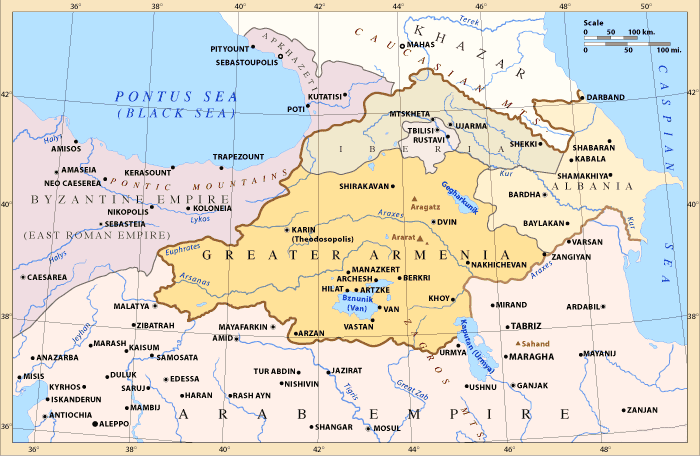
- — Principality of Iberia
- Status: Principality
- Capital: Tbilisi; (c. 588–736); Uplistsikhe; (c. 736–813); Artanuji; (c. 813–888)
- Common languages: Georgian
- Religion: Georgian Orthodox Church
- Prince
  - 588–c. 590: Guaram I (first)
  - 881–888 King of Iberia in 888–923: Adarnase IV (last prince)
- Historical era: Early Middle Ages
  - Established: c. 588
  - Restoration of the Iberian kingship: 888
Preceded by
Sasanian Iberia
Kingdom of Iberia
Succeeded by
Kingdom of the Iberians
Principality of Kakheti
Emirate of Tbilisi

The Principality of Iberia (Note: Georgian: ქართლის საერისმთავრო, romanized: kartlis saerismtavro) was an early medieval aristocratic regime in a core Georgian region of Kartli, called Iberia by classical authors. It flourished in the period of interregnum between the sixth and ninth centuries, when the leading political authority was exercised by a succession of princes. The principality was established shortly after the Sassanid suppression of the local royal Chosroid dynasty, around 580; it lasted until 888, when the kingship was restored by a member of the Bagrationi dynasty. Its borders fluctuated greatly as the presiding princes of Iberia confronted the Persians, Byzantines, Khazars, Arabs, and neighboring Caucasian rulers throughout this period.

The time of the principate was climacteric in the history of Georgia; the principality saw the final formation of the Georgian Christian Church, the first flourishing of a literary tradition in the native language, the rise of the Georgian Bagratid family, and the beginning of cultural and political unification of various feudal enclaves, which would be united to form the Kingdom of Georgia by the early 11th century.

== History ==
When the king of a great unified Iberia, Bakur III, died in 580, the Sassanid government of Persia under Hormizd IV (578–590) seized on the opportunity to abolish the Iberian monarchy. Iberia became a Persian province ruled by a marzpan (governor). The Iberian nobles acquiesced to this change without resistance, while the heirs of the royal house withdrew to their highland fortresses – the main Chosroid line in Kakheti, and the younger Guaramid branch in Klarjeti and Javakheti. However, the direct Persian control brought about heavy taxation and an energetic promotion of Zoroastrianism in a largely Christian country. Therefore, when the Eastern Roman emperor Maurice embarked upon a military campaign against Persia in 582, the Iberian nobles requested that he helped restore the monarchy. Maurice did respond, and, in 588, sent his protégé, Guaram I of the Guaramids, as a new ruler to Iberia. However, Guaram was not crowned as king, but recognized as a presiding prince and bestowed with the Eastern Roman title of curopalates. The Byzantine-Sassanid treaty of 591 confirmed this new rearrangement but left Iberia divided into Roman- and Sassanid-dominated parts at the town of Tbilisi.

Thus, the establishment of the principate marked the ascendancy of the dynastic aristocracy in Iberia and was a compromise solution amid the Byzantine-Sassanid rivalry for the control of the Caucasus. The presiding princes of Iberia, as the leading local political authority, were to be confirmed and sanctioned by the court of Constantinople. They are variously entitled in Georgian sources, erist'avt'-mt'avari, eris-mt'avari, erist'avt'-erist'avi, or simply erist'avi (normally translated in English as "prince", "arch-duke", or "duke"). Most of them were additionally invested with various Roman/Byzantine titles. For example, eight out of the fourteen presiding princes held the dignity of curopalates, one of the highest in the Eastern Empire. The medieval Georgian chronicles make it clear, however, that these princes, although they enjoyed the loyalty of the great nobles, were of limited capabilities since they "could not remove the dukes of Iberia from their duchies because they had charters from the Great King and from the Emperor confirming them in their duchies".

Through offering their protection to the Iberian principate, the Byzantine emperors pushed to limit Sassanid and then Islamic influence in the Caucasus, but the princes of Iberia were not always consistent in their pro-Byzantine line, and, as a matter of political expediency, sometimes recognized the suzerainty of the rival regional powers.

Guaram's successor, the second presiding prince Stephen I, reoriented his politics towards Persia in a quest to reunite a divided Iberia, but this cost him his life when the Byzantine emperor Heraclius attacked Tbilisi in 626. Heraclius reinstated a member of the more pro-Byzantine Chosroid house, which, nevertheless, was forced to recognize the suzerainty of the Umayyad Caliph in the 640s, but revolted, unsuccessfully, against the Arab hegemony in the 680s. Dispossessed of the principate of Iberia, the Chosroids retired to their appanage in Kakheti where they ruled as regional princes until the family became extinct by the early 9th century. The Guaramids returned to power and faced the difficult task of manoeuvring between the Byzantines and Arabs. The Arabs, primarily concerned with maintaining control of the cities and trade routes, dispossessed them of Tbilisi where a Muslim emir was installed in the 730s. The dynasts of Iberia sat at Uplistsikhe whence they exercised only a limited authority over local Georgian lords who, entrenched in their mountain castles, maintained a degree of freedom from the Arabs. The Guaramids were briefly succeeded by the Nersianids between c. 748 and 779/80, and had vanished once and for all by 786. This year witnessed a bloody crackdown upon the rebellious Georgian nobles organized by Khuzayma ibn Khazim, an Arab viceroy (wali) of the Caucasus.

The extinction of the Guaramids and near-extinction of the Chosroids allowed their energetic cousins of the Bagratid family, in the person of Ashot I (r. 786/813–830) to gather their inheritance in parts of Iberia. Having accepted the Byzantine protection, the Bagratids, from their base in the region of Tao-Klarjeti, presided over the period of cultural revival and territorial expansionism. In 888, Adarnase I, of the Bagratids, who had emerged as a winner in protracted dynastic strife, succeeded in restoring the Georgian royal authority by assuming the title of the King of the Georgians.

== Presiding princes of Iberia ==
Princes	Reign	Dynasty
1. Guaram I	588 – c. 590	Guaramids
2. Stephen I	c. 590–627	Guaramids
3. Adarnase I	627–637/642	Chosroids
4. Stephen II	637/642 – c. 650	Chosroids
5. Adarnase II	c. 650–684	Chosroids
6. Guaram II	684 – c. 693	Guaramids
7. Guaram III	c. 693 – c. 748	Guaramids
8. Adarnase III	c. 748 – c. 760	Nersianids
9. Nerse	c. 760–772, 775–779/780	Nersianids
10. Stephen III	779/780–786	Guaramids
11. Ashot I	813–830	Bagrationi
12. Bagrat I	842/843–876	Bagrationi
13. David I	876–881	Bagrationi
14. Gurgen I	881–888	Bagrationi

== Gallery ==
Church architecture in the principality

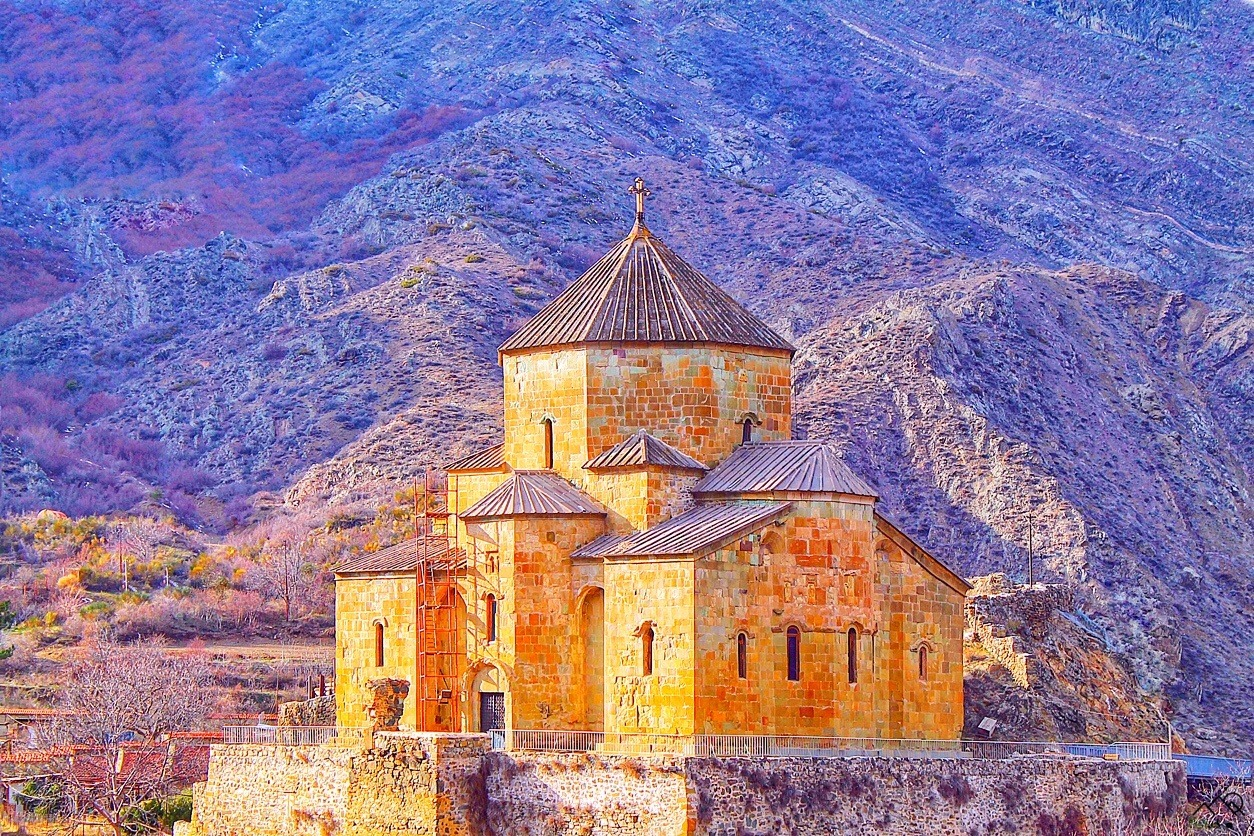
Ateni Sioni Church, early 600s

Jvari monastery, 586-605

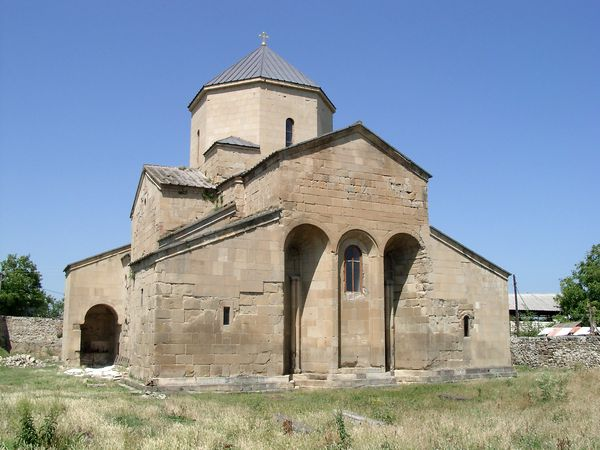
Tsromi church, 626–634
