= Qaleh-ye Gol, Kohgiluyeh and Boyer-Ahmad =

Village in Kohgiluyeh and Boyer-Ahmad, Iran

Qaleh-ye Gol قلعه گل
- Village
- Location within Iran
- Coordinates: 30°57′33″N 50°37′10″E
- Country: Iran
- Province: Kohgiluyeh and Boyer-Ahmad
- County: Kohgiluyeh
- Bakhsh: Central
- Rural District: Doshman Ziari

Population (2006)
  - Total: 374
- Time zone: UTC+3:30 (IRST)
  - Summer (DST): UTC+4:30 (IRDT)

Qaleh-ye Gol (Persian: قلعه گل, also Romanized as Qal‘eh-ye Gol and Qal‘eh Gol; also known as Qal‘eh-i-Gulāb and Qal‘eh-ye Golāb) is a village in Doshman Ziari Rural District, in the Central District of Kohgiluyeh County, Kohgiluyeh and Boyer-Ahmad Province, Iran. At the 2006 census, its population was 374, in 73 families.
