= Simon II of Kartli =

King of Kartli from 1619 to 1631

Simon II

King of Kartli
- Reign: 1619–1631
- Predecessor: Bagrat VII
- Successor: Teimuraz I
- Anti-king: Teimuraz I (1625–1631)
- Born: c. 1608 (Note: According to Fazli Isfahani Khuzani, Simon II was 16 years old when he married Jahan Banu Begum in 1624.)
- Died: 1631
- Spouse: Jahan Banu Begum
- Dynasty: Bagrationi
- Father: Bagrat VII
- Mother: Ana of Kakheti
- Religion: Shia Islam

Simon II (also Svimon II; Georgian: სიმონ II [სვიმონ II]; c. 1608–1631), also known as Simon Khan and Semayun Khan, was a Persian-appointed king (mepe) of Kartli from 1619 to 1631.

== Biography ==
Simon was the only son of Bagrat VII and his wife, Ana, daughter of Alexander II of Kakheti. He was brought up Muslim in Isfahan, Persia.

On the death of his father in 1619, Simon, still a minor, was installed by Shah Abbas I as a khan of Kartli. A Georgian noble, also a convert, Giorgi Saakadze, was appointed as a vekil (regent) and vizier to him. Largely unpopular with his Christian subjects, Simon's "khanate" never stretched beyond the capital Tbilisi and the Lower Kartli province, where the districts of Somkhiti and Sabaratiano were occupied by Persian forces.

In March 1625, Saakadze sided with the opposition in Kartli and the neighbouring Kakheti. He led Georgian forces that destroyed a Persian army at the Battle of Martqopi. Simon and his Persians fled from Tbilisi to the fortress of Aghjakala in Lower Kartli: the rebels gave Kartli to king Teimuraz I of Kakheti. On July 1 of 1625, the Persians defeated the Georgians at the Battle of Marabda. A Persian general, Isa Khan, reinstated Simon in Tbilisi, but significant parts of Kartli remained under the control of Teimuraz and Saakadze. Shah Abbas utilised the rivalry among the rebel leaders to divide them.

Soon after 1626, one of the rebel nobles and a powerful mountain lord, Zurab, Duke of Aragvi defected to Simon. Zurab later made a secret alliance with the insurgents. In 1631, he murdered the sleeping khan. Zurab sent Simon's severed head to Teimuraz, who later regained authority in Kartli.

== Family ==
Simon was married to Jahan Banu Begum, granddaughter of Shah Abbas I by his daughter Fatima Sultan Begum and Isa Khan Safavi. They probably had one daughter Princess Izz-i-Sharif Begum, who was married off to the Safavid prince Sayyid Abdullah al-Husaini al-Marashi, son of Mirza Muhammad Shafi. Their eldest son in turn, Sayyid Mirza Muhammad Daud al-Husaini al-Marashi (Isfahan, 25 January 1655 - c. 1715), Mutawali of the Shrine of the Imam Reza at Mashhad, married Princess Shahr Banu Begum, the daughter of Safavid king Suleiman I.

== Bibliography ==
- Brosset, Marie-Félicité (1856). Histoire de la Géorgie depuis l'Antiquité jusqu'au XIXe siècle. IIe partie. Histoire moderne [History of Georgia from Antiquity to the 19th century. Part II. Modern History] (in French). S.-Pétersbourg: A la typographie de l'Academie Impériale des Sciences.
- Toumanoff, Cyril (1976). Manuel de Généalogie et de Chronologie pour l'histoire de la Caucasie chrétienne (Arménie, Géorgie, Albanie) [Manual of Genealogy and Chronology of Christian Caucasian History (Armenia, Georgia, Albania)] (in French). Rome: Edizioni Aquila.
- Floor, Willem; Herzig, Edmund, eds. (2012). Iran and the World in the Safavid Age. I.B.Tauris. p. 502. ISBN 978-1850439301.
- Javakhishvili, Ivane (2012). Margo Inasaridze (ed.). ქართველი ერის ისტორია [History of the Georgian Nation] (in Georgian). Vol. IV. Tbilisi: Palitra L. ISBN 978-9941-19-790-1.
- Dumbadze, Mamia (1973). Essays on the History of Georgia (in Georgian). Vol. 4. Tbilisi: Soviet Georgia.

| Preceded by Bagrat VII | King of Kartli; 1619–1631 | Succeeded by Teimuraz I |
