= Guaram II =

Guaram II (Georgian: გუარამ II), of the Guaramid dynasty, was a presiding prince of Iberia (Kartli, eastern Georgia) from 684/85 to c. 693.

He was a hereditary duke (eristavi) of Klarjeti and Javakheti, and acquired the office of presiding prince of Iberia when his predecessor, Adarnase II of the Chosroid dynasty died in the struggle with the Khazars in 684/85. Around the year 689, after a successful Byzantine campaign against the Umayyad Caliphate, Guaram transferred his allegiance from the Umayyads to the emperor Justinian II and was conferred with the title of curopalates. He must have been succeeded by his son or grandson Guaram III shortly before 693, the year when the Arabs succeeded in retaking the Caucasus with the help of their Khazar allies and introduced direct rule through their viceroy (wali) at Dvin.

Preceded by Adarnase II	Prince of Iberia; 684/5 – pre-693	Succeeded by Guaram III
