= Amanelisdze =

Georgian noble family

The map of the Duchy of Argveti, ruled by the House of Amanelisdze

The House of Amanelisdze (Georgian: ამანელისძე) was a noble family in medieval Georgia with a surge in prominence in the 12th and 13th centuries.

== History ==
The 13th-century anonymous Georgian chronicle The Histories and Eulogies of the Sovereigns mentions the Amanelisdze, together with the Vardanisdze and Saghiridze, as participants of the sword-girdling ceremony of Queen Tamar upon her coronation in 1184.

During Tamar's reign, the family, with the title of eristavi ("duke"), held sway over the fief of Argueti in western Georgia, which purportedly passed on to them from the House of Kakhaberidze. Upon the latter family's return to ascendancy, the Amanelisdze went in decline and disappeared from the records.

According to the 20th-century Georgian historian Ivane Javakhishvili, Queen Tamar's grandson King David VI (r. 1245–1293) was married, as his first wife, to a member of the Amanelisdze family, Tamar, who mothered three sons of David, all of them subsequently reigning monarchs.

Tamar's background is not mentioned in the Georgian chronicles, but she is known from the surviving contemporary charters, one of which identifies her as "the daughter of Emenelasdze", a corrupted form of Amanelisdze, as posited by Javakhishvili. The anonymous author of The Histories and Eulogies of the Sovereigns makes reference only to David's one consort, a Palaeologian princess from Constantinople.
