= Stephen III of Iberia =

Stephen III (Georgian: სტეფანოზ III, Step'anoz III), of the Guaramid dynasty, was a presiding prince of Iberia (Kartli, eastern Georgia) from 779/780 to 786. He was the son of Guaram IV of Iberia.

Stephen was installed by the Abbasid Caliphate in the place of his maternal uncle Nerse, who had revolted against the Arab rule. By 786, when Nerse's Christianized Arab servant, Abo, was martyred, both Nerse and Stephen had disappeared from history, and the Guaramid power had vanished once and for all.

Stephen is probably the unnamed young Iberian prince mentioned by the Armenian chronicler Ghevond Yerets among the Caucasian dynasts executed at the hands of the Arab viceroy Khuzayma ibn Khazim.

Preceded by Nerse	Prince of Iberia; 779/80–786	Succeeded by Ashot I
