= Kouropalates =

Byzantine court title; curopalate

- κουροπαλάτης
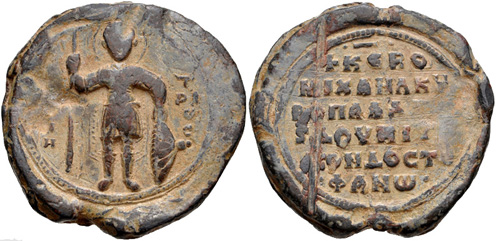
- Lead seal of Michael Kontostephanos, kouropalates and doux of Antioch, ca. 1055
- Member of: Byzantine Senate
- Appointer: Byzantine emperor
- Term length: Life tenure
- Formation: Fifth Century
- First holder: Justin
- Final holder: Michael (1339)
- Abolished: 29 May 1460
- Succession: Third; Fourth (c. 1070); Fifth (c. 1081); Eleventh (c. 1118); Fifteenth (Fourteenth Century)
- Salary: 2,304 nomismata (1074)

Kouropalatēs, Latinized as curopalates or curopalata (Greek: κουροπαλάτης, from Latin: cura palatii "[the one in] charge of the palace") and anglicized as curopalate, was a Byzantine court title, one of the highest from the time of Emperor Justinian I to the Komnenian period in the 12th century. The female variant, held by the spouses of the kouropalatai, was kouropalatissa.

== History and nature of the title ==
The title is first attested (as curapalati) in the early 5th century, as an official of vir spectabilis rank under the castrensis palatii, charged with the maintenance of the imperial palace (cf. Western European "majordomo"). When Emperor Justinian I (r. 527–565) made his nephew and heir Justin II curopalates in 552, however, the office took on new significance, and became one of the most exalted dignities, ranking next to Caesar and nobilissimus and, like them, reserved initially for members of the imperial family. Unlike them, however, it later came to be granted to important foreign rulers, mostly in the Caucasus. Thus, from the 580s to the 1060s, sixteen Georgian ruling princes and kings held that honorific title, as well as, after 635, several Armenian dynasts.

According to the Klētorologion of Philotheos, written in 899, the insignia of the rank were a red tunic, mantle and belt. Their award by the Byzantine emperor signified the elevation of the recipient to the office. By the 11th–12th century, the dignity had lost its earlier significance: it was granted as an honorary title to generals outside the imperial family, and its functions were gradually being supplanted by the protovestiarios, whose original role was limited to the custody of the imperial wardrobe. The title survived into the Palaiologan period, but was rarely used.

== List of prominent Byzantine holders ==
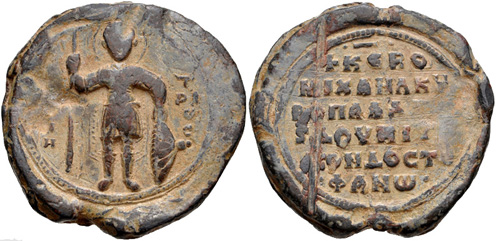
Lead seal of Michael Kontostephanos, kouropalates and doux of Antioch, ca. 1055

- Justin II, under his uncle, Emperor Justinian I (r. 527–565).
- Baduarius, under his father-in-law Emperor Justin II (r. 565–578).
- Peter, the brother of Emperor Maurice (r. 582–602).
- Domentziolus, the nephew of Emperor Phocas (r. 602–610).
- Theodore, brother of Emperor Heraclius (r. 610–641).
- Artabasdos, under Emperor Leo III the Isaurian (r. 717–741).
- Michael I Rangabe, the son-in-law of Emperor Nikephoros I (r. 802–811).
- Bardas, uncle and effective regent for Emperor Michael III (r. 842–867).
- Leo Phokas, general and brother of Emperor Nikephoros II Phokas (r. 963–969).
- Guaram I, Prince of Iberia
- Guaram II, Prince of Iberia and hereditary duke (eristavi) of Klarjeti and Javakheti
- Guaram III, Prince of Kartli

== See also ==
- Darigbed – the Sassanian equivalent

== Sources ==
- Bury, J. B.; Philotheus (1911). The Imperial Administrative System of the Ninth Century (With a Revised Text of the Kletorologion of Philotheos). London: Oxford University Press.
- Evans, James Allan (23 June 1999). "An Online Encyclopedia of Roman Emperors: Justin II (565–579 A.D.)".
- Holmes, Catherine (2005). Basil II and the Governance of Empire (976–1025). Oxford: Oxford University Press. ISBN 978-0-19-927968-5.
- Kazhdan, Alexander, ed. (1991). The Oxford Dictionary of Byzantium. Oxford and New York: Oxford University Press. ISBN 0-19-504652-8.
- Martindale, John R., ed. (1992). The Prosopography of the Later Roman Empire: Volume III, AD 527–641. Cambridge: Cambridge University Press. ISBN 0-521-20160-8.
- Rapp, Stephen H. (2003). Studies In Medieval Georgian Historiography: Early Texts And Eurasian Contexts. Louvain, Belgium: Éditions Peeters. ISBN 90-429-1318-5.
- Toumanoff, Cyril (1963). Studies in Christian Caucasian History. Washington, DC: Georgetown University Press.
