= Vakhtang Gorgasali's campaign in North Caucasus =

Campaign of Georgian King against the nomads in the Northern Caucasus

Vakhtang Gorgasali's campaign in the Northern Caucasus
Date	466 AD
Location	Northern Caucasus (Alania, Pachanigeti, Jiketi)
Result	Iberian victory

Belligerents
Kingdom of Iberia; Arran; Supported by: Sassanian Empire	North Caucasian Huns; Saragurs; Alans

Commanders and leaders
Vakhtang I Gorgasali	Bakatar

Vakhtang Gorgasali's campaign in the Northern Caucasus (Georgian: ვახტანგ გორგასლის ლაშქრობა ჩრდილოეთ კავკასიაში) was a military campaign led by the Kingdom of Iberia under King Vakhtang Gorgasali against the nomadic invaders from the North Caucasus. The campaign, supported by the Sassanian empire, ended in an Iberian victory and an end to nomadic raids into Iberia.

== Background ==
In the 5th century, the Caucasus was at the intersection of the interests of Byzantine and Sassanid empires. However, the Iranian positions were stronger and the Kingdom of Iberia, as well as many other kingdoms, were Iranian vassals. Starting from 373, Iberia was divided in two parts, with one being a vassal of Persia, while the other, southwestern part, was under Byzantine influence.

The Kingdom of Iberia enjoyed relative prosperity with the developed agriculture and city life. However, being an early feudal kingdom, it also suffered from decentralizing tendencies and various internal issues. The Georgian Christian Church suffered from the expansion of Zoroastrian influence under Iranian auspices, with the bishop of Zoroastrians enjoying same rights in the kingdom's decision-making as the head of the Georgian Church.

The Iranian pressure on the Caucasian kingdoms increased in the first half of the 5th century under Shah Yazdegerd II. He introduced a new military duty, including an obligation for his vassals to levy manpower for Iranian expansionist wars against the nomadic states in the Central Asia and the territory of modern Afghanistan. Moreover, he pushed for increasing the Zoroastrian influence and imposed new taxes meant to further strangle the independence of the Caucasian kingdoms.

When Iberian King Mirdat died, his successor, Prince Vakhtang, was only seven years old. At that time, his mother Sagdukht went to Barda to ask her father Barzabod, the Bidaxsh of Arran, to allow Vakhtang to keep his Christian faith. It seems that the Bidaxsh of Arran was a suzerain of Iberia during this time. Barzabod "showed mercy" towards her daughter and agreed to allow Vakhtang to remain Christian, although also strengthening the propaganda of Zoroastrianism in Iberia by sending new Zoroastrian bishops to promote this faith. The Bidaxsh of Arran mediated Vakhtang's accession to throne, which led to the Iranian Shah approving his accession by sending a crown with the precious stones.

Additionally, Iberians, as well as Byzantines and Iranians, suffered from the nomadic invasions, with Iberia being affected the most by the invasions through North Caucasian roads, while Byzantines and Iranians were also engaging nomads on other frontiers. Byzantines were even paying Iran a military subsidy to protect North Caucasian mountain passes from the nomads, mostly Huns and others.

== Campaign ==
When Vakhtang was 10 years old, the Huns and Saragurs invaded from the North Caucasus and looted Iberia, Armenia and Arran. They also took Vakhtang's sister Mirandukht as a captive. The Georgian Chronicles calls the invaders Ossetians, which attests their participation too. The invaders pillaged Iberia from the source of Kura river to Khunan, although they could not capture any castle town except Kaspi. After the invasion, they returned to the North Caucasus through the Daruband pass.

When King Vakhtang became 15 years old, he began to prepare for a campaign against the northern nomads. Vakhtang realized that rebelling against Sassanid rule would only bring devastating results at this point, and that he would need to prepare for an appropriate moment. Moreover, the nomadic invasions were a more immediate concern, something that also united Iranians and Byzantines under a common banner. While fighting against Iran at this point would have been too difficult, the nomadic invasions could not be left unanswered. Vakhtang did understand that to achieve complete independence, he would eventually need to fight with the Sassanids. However, at this stage more important matters were strengthening Iberian borders and centralizing the state authority. Not only did Vakhtang simply agree to be Iranian vassal as a part of this policy, but he would also go on and take part as an Iranian vassal in Iranian wars in the Central Asia to protect its eastern borders from nomads in the 460s.

Vakhtang convened Darbazi (advisory council) to conduct the campaign against the nomads in the North Caucasus. Vakhtang used his status as a vassal of Iran to strengthen his ambitions. The invasion of nomads into Iberia meant, besides other things, the violation of Iranian sovereignty, therefore, Vakhtang asked the Bidaxsh of Arran, Varaz-Bakur, of assistance, because during their invasion, the nomads not only raided Iberia, but also the lands of Varaz-Bakur, who was a successor to Barzabod.

Vakhtang built a large alliance across the kingdoms of the Caucasus, and led a campaign which ended in a massive success. The army first camped at Mukhrani Valley and Kherki (near Saguramo), after which they moved to Tianeti and were joined by North Caucasian allies (initially the Kist-Bats people and the tribal leaders of Dagestan). The opposing forces met and clashed at the river of Terek. The army led by Vakhtang secured victory, captured a large loot and freed all hostages, including Vakhtang's sister. Most importantly, Vakhtang firmly secured the Dariali Pass. He put his garrison in the gorge, formally securing Iranian, but in fact a Georgian northern border. He expanded Georgian influence over Dvaleti, Alania, Dzurdzuketi, Didoeti and Tsuketi. After this, Vakhtang controlled the roads to the North Caucasus and the movement of nomads.

After securing Dariali Pass, Vakhtang continued moving westward and crossed into Abkhazia through the Klukhori pass. Lazica was ruled at this point by Gubazes I, whose relations with his suzerain, the Byzantine Emperor, cooled following the Byzantine annexation of some of Laz territories and Laz revolt against the empire, which is described by Priscus of Panium in fragments no. 25 and 26 of his "Gothic History". Although the conflict was settled by 465, the Svan tribe used the opportunity to revolt against the Byzantines and Lazs. Lazs asked the Byzantines for help, while the Svans requested assistance from the Persians and Iberians. This happened in 466. According to Priscus, the Byzantines sent an army led by the general Heraclius, but the conflict with the Persians and Iberians was avoided as they became preoccupied with "other engagements" (possibly the Hunnic and Saragur invasion of Iberia, which could have happened this year). However, in 467–468, Svans revolted again and asked for Persian assistance. This is when Vakhtang Gorgasali led his force from the North Caucasus into Lazica. The Byzantine emperor Leo I was unable to send his troops to aid Lazica, and in three years Vakhtang managed to conquer all fortresses up until Tsikhegoji.

== Aftermath ==
Vakhtang shared his loot with the Bidaxsh of Arran and Shah of Iran. He sent a large diplomatic mission to the Shah, headed by the bishop of Kartli's Zoroastrians Binkaran. Vakhtang asked the Shah for his daughter Balendukht's hand in marriage, and the Shah gave it. Thus, in a major diplomatic step, Vakhtang became dynastically connected to Shah Hormizd III.

Vakhtang managed to spread his rule over Egrisi. He annexed the historic Argveti and Svaneti provinces. Although Egrisi and Svaneti became principalities within Iberia, their princes most likely were still appointed from the local dynasties and by Shah's approval. The border of Iberia now ran along the Kelasuri river as the territory north of it, Abasgia, was firmly held by Byzantium.

In the immediate future Vakhtang also proceeded to recover Klarjeti from the Byzantines. This was territory of Iberia which seceded in the 370s under the protection of the Byzantines. He also recovered Adjara, Samtskhe, Artaani and Javakheti, and thus entire territory of "Western Iberia" which was a Byzantine protectorate. Vakhtang would also proceed to build many fortresses in Klarjeti as a possible refuge for a potential future rebellion against Iran. In the east, Vakhtang managed to annex parts of Hereti and Kiziki, as well as Tsakhet-Tsakhuri. Here he created the new duchy of Hereti. All these actions were taken by Vakhtang as a vassal of Iran and, in some cases, even with the help of Iranian troops.

In the 460s, Vakhtang fought with the Iranian troops against Hephthalites on the eastern frontier of Iran. He also managed to make Byzantium recognize the Georgian Church's autocephaly. Vakhtang later married the daughter of Byzantine Emperor and, after securing his positions, confronted Iran in the late 470s by expelling Zoroastrian priests. However, Iberia suffered a successful Iranian invasion, with the Byzantine envoy managing to negotiate a truce between Vakhtang and Shah Peroz. Shah agreed to stop propagating Zoroastrianism in Iberia, although it largely remained an Iranian vassal. However, Vakhtang would continue causing problems to Iran as he soon would launch another revolt in 482, this time after Iranians suffered a defeat at the hands of Hepthalites, amidst an ongoing rebellion against Iranian authorities in the Caucasian Albania. This would coincide with the simultaneous Armenian revolt against the Sassanids. Although the Iranian army would manage to overwhelm the Armenian and Iberian rebels, it would withdraw from the Caucasus after the death of Shah Peroz at the hands of Hepthalites in 484. This would bring a short-lived independence for Iberia, until in 491 the new shah, Kavad I, invaded Iberia and launched a war against Byzantium in which Vakhtang ultimately died from his wounds. In the 520s, the peace treaty between Byzantium and Iran restored the former boundaries between the empires and Tbilisi was governed by a Persian marzpan.

== Date ==
The campaign is described by the medieval Georgian historian Juansher Juansheriani in the Georgian chronicles, which does not specifies a date. Juansher Juansheriani mentions that Vakhtang Gorgasali's campaign occurred 5–6 years after the nomadic invasion into Iberia.

The nomadic invasion described by Juansher is usually identified with one of the Hunnic and Saragur raids in Transcaucasia, mentioned by Priscus of Panium in different fragments of his "Gothic History", with one occurring in 448 while the other in 466. Georgian historian David Muskhelishvili equated the nomadic invasion to the one described by Priscus in the no. 8 fragment of his "Gothic History" which speaks of the Hunnic invasion of Media, occurring in 448, although opponents of this view consider this fragment to be actually describing the Hunnic raid of 395, which did not affect Iberia. Historians Nodar Lomouri and Anri Bogveradze equate the nomadic invasion in Juansher's work to the Saragur invasion of 466 described in the no. 37 fragment of "Gothic History".

Historian Margit Bíró identifies the nomadic invasion with the Hunnic campaign against the Caucasian Albania, which is described by Armenian medieval historians Elishe and Movses Kaghankatvatsi. Vache II of Albania used political instability in Persia following the death of Shah Yazdegerd II to renounce his loyalty to Sassanids, which led to Shah Peroz I letting Huns to raid his country between 459 and 463. Thus, according to Bíró, the main aim of the raid was Caucasian Albania. It is not known whether Georgians participated in this rebellion.

Georgian historian Giorgi Shurgaia reconciles conflicting facts by claiming that in 460, while Persians were fighting the Albanians, they opened the Darial Pass and allowed Albania to be raided by the Huns, which pillaged Iberia too. The nomadic invasion described by Juansher is the same as the one described by Elishe and is placed in 460. Vakhtang's campaign happened six years later in 466. This occurred after a friendly treaty between the Byzantines and Saragurs in 463 and the Saragur invasion of Transcaucasia in 466, including the invasion of Iberia, after which Shah Peroz gave a mandate to Vakhtang to launch a campaign against the nomads. However, through this campaign Vakhtang also began a process of weakening Sassanid rule over Iberia, since he now himself controlled the Dariali Pass and could enlist nomads against the Iranians, which he indeed did in 483.

The friendly treaty between the Byzantines and Saragurs is described by Priscus: Saragurs, Oghurs and Onogurs sent a diplomatic mission to Byzantium, after they were driven from their lands to the Northern Caucasus by Sabirs. There they attacked and subdued the Hun-Akatziris. The Byzantine Emperor Leo sent ambassadors back with many gifts. In 466, the Huns, including Akatziris and other tribes, launched a campaign against the Persians according to Priscus. They invaded Iberia and Armenia and looted their settlements. The Byzantines refused to pay a military subsidy to Persians to protect the areas, which led to the Shah sending Vakhtang Gorgasali back to Iberia from the ongoing campaign against the Kidara Huns in the Central Asia. According to some historians, this Hunnic invasion to Transcaucasia was provoked by the Byzantines.

Muskhelashvili has also theorized that as Juansher was not Vakhtang's contemporary, his account of the nomadic invasion could have been a reflection unifying the elements of both the 448 and 466 campaigns, with Vakhtang's sister being abducted in 466 rather than 448.

== Sources ==
- Lortkipanidze, Mariam (2006). საქართველოს ისტორია [History of Georgia] (PDF) (in Georgian). Vol. 1. Tbilisi: Publishing House of Tbilisi University. ISBN 9994012622.
- Rayfield, Donald (2012). Edge of Empires, a History of Georgia. London: Reaktion Books. ISBN 9781780230306.
- Shurgaia, Giorgi (2021). "ქართლის სამეფოს ჩრდილოკავკასიური პოლიტიკის ისტორიის ერთი ფურცელი" [A Page from the History of the North Caucasian Politics of the Kingdom of Kartli]. Georgian Source-Studies. 23. Ivane Javakhisvili Institute of History and Ethnology.
- Bíró, Margit (1997). "On the Presence of the Huns in the Caucasus: To the Chronology of the 'OVS' Raid Mentioned in J̌uanšer's Chronicle". Acta Orientalia Academiae Scientiarum Hungaricae. 50. Akadémiai Kiadó.
- Alasania, Giuli (2008). ქართველები და ისლამამდელი თურქები [Georgians and Pre-Islamic Turks] (PDF). Tbilisi: Sakartvelos Matsne. ISBN 9789941406416.
- Muskhelashvili, Davit (2003). საქართველო IV-VIII საუკუნეებში [Georgia in the 4th-8th centuries] (PDF). Tbilisi: Ivane Javakhishvili Institute of History and Ethnology.
