= Razhden the Protomartyr =

Christian Saint

Saint Razhden the Protomartyr
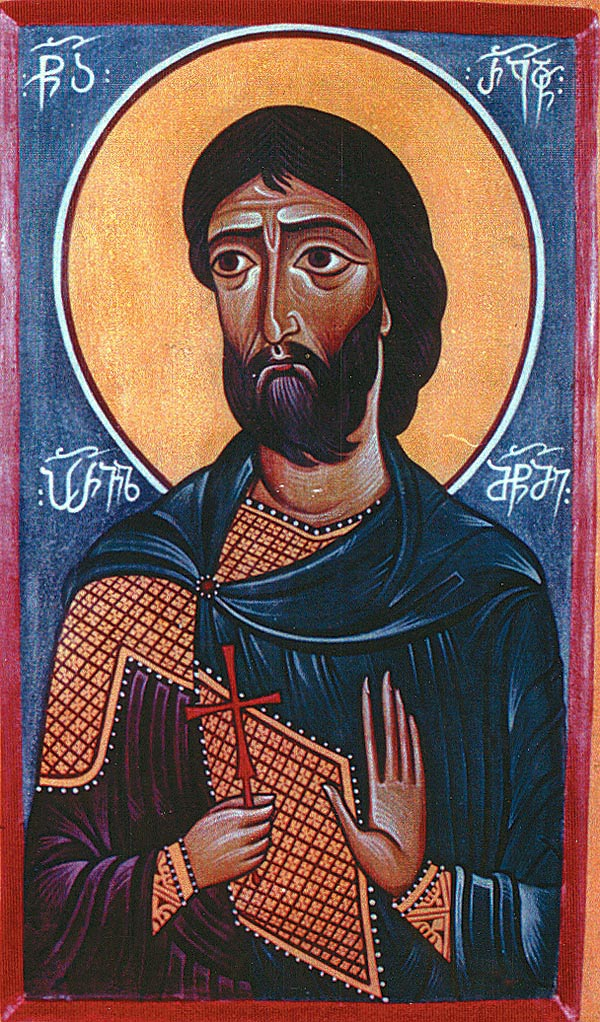
- Artwork of Razhden

Protomartyr of Persia
- Died: August 3, c. 457 AD; Tsromi, Iberia, Sasanian Empire
- Venerated in: Eastern Orthodox Church
- Feast: August 16 (3)

Razhden (Georgian: რაჟდენი, romanized: razhdeni, also transliterated as Ražden or Rajden; died c. 457 AD) was a 5th-century Persian nobleman in the service of the Georgian king Vakhtang I of Iberia and a convert to Christianity who was executed by the Sassanid military in Iberia. He was canonized by the Georgian Orthodox Church as St. Razhden the Protomartyr (რაჟდენ პირველმოწამე, razhden pirvelmotsame), with his feast day marked on August 16 (O.S. August 3).

== History ==
The earliest mention of Razhden is found in the History of King Vakhtang Gorgasali, part of the medieval Georgian historical compendium, composed in the 8th or 11th century and traditionally attributed to Juansher Juansheriani. The source relates Razhden's death as a martyr during the war of Sassanids against Vakhtang I.

Razhden was a guardian or tutor (მამამძუძუ, mamamdzudzu) of Balendukht, a daughter of the king of the Persians, whom he accompanied to Iberia on the occasion of her marriage with Vakhtang. Razhden converted to Christianity and entered Vakhtang’s service, proving himself an able soldier. He was eventually taken captive by the Persians and tortured to death for refusing to reject Christianity. Vakhtang later built the church of Nikozi at the site of Razhden's burial and installed a bishop there. According to the "History of King Vakhtang Gorgasali", Vakhtang also built a church in St. Razhden's honor in the suburb of Ujarma.

The Georgian name "Razhden" is of Iranian theophoric origin, perhaps being a composite of two Iranian words. Thea Chkeidze / Encyclopædia Iranica notes:

(...) its second component, -dēn, comes from Mid. Pers. dēn “creed, religion,” while the first one is perhaps Ir. rōž/rōz “day, light, happiness,” i.e., *Rōždēn- “happy religion.” The component rōz is also present in the Georgian family name Berozashvili (< NPers. Behrūz “happy, fortunate”).

== Hagiography ==
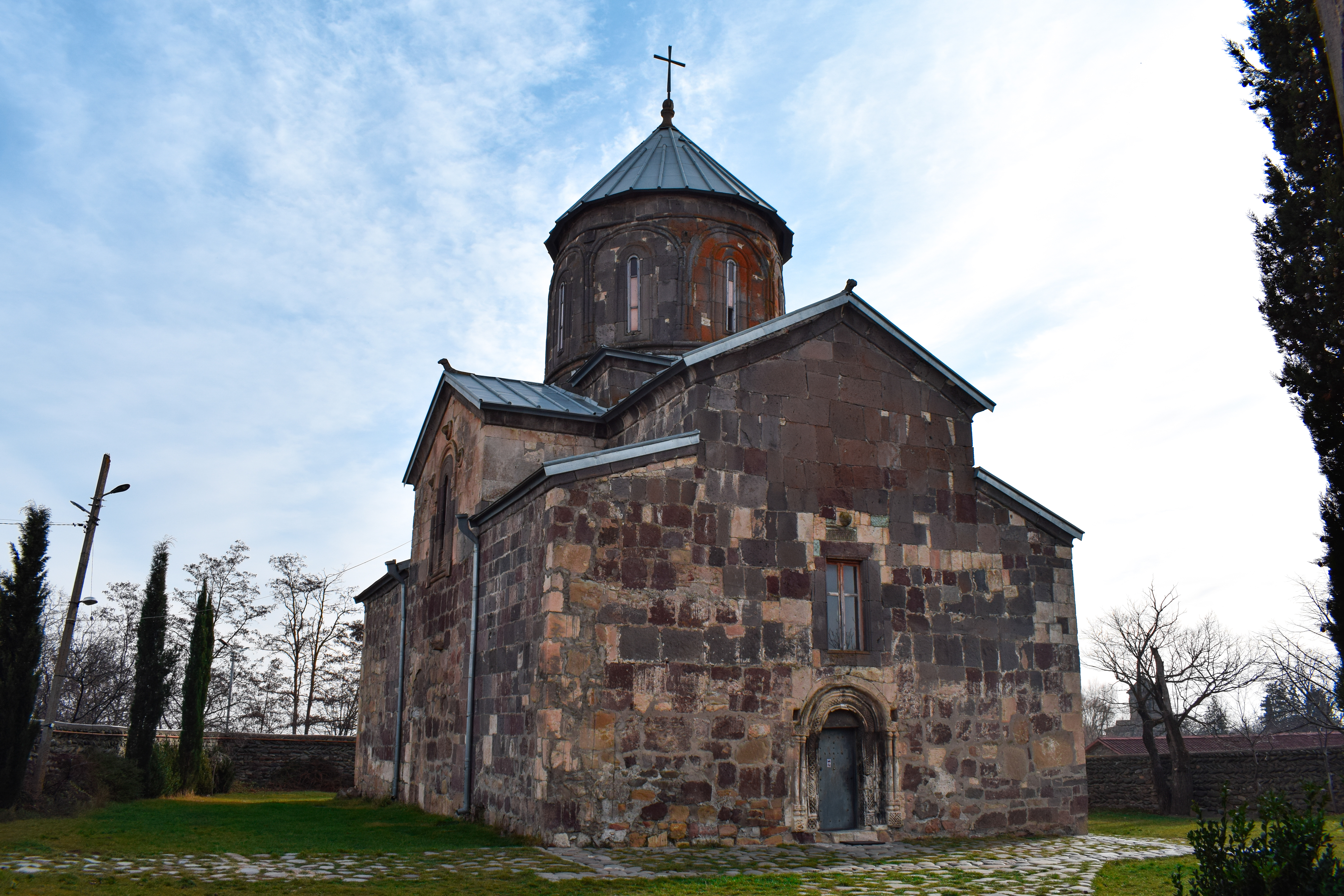
The church of Nikozi

In the 1720s, the brief medieval narrative of Juansher was transformed into hagiography by the Georgian catholicos Besarion Orbelishvili, who refurbished the story with further details. According to Besarion, the captive Razhden was pressured by the king of the Persians himself into denouncing his Christian faith. Briefly freed, through the mediation of Georgian nobles, to bid a farewell to his family, Razhden voluntarily returned to captivity and was handed over to a Persian commander in Tsromi, in Iberia, where he was eventually crucified, along with five criminals, and shot with arrows. Besarion also authored a canon to St. Razhden, while another Georgian catholicos of the 18th century, Anton I, included a rewritten passion of Razhden in his collection of Georgian martyrdoms in the 1760s.

The sources on Razhden were compiled by Mikhail Sabinin into his account of the saint's life, embedded in the "Paradise of Georgia" (საქართველოს სამოთხე, sakartvelos samotkhe) published in St. Petersburg in 1882. Razhden's passion was translated into Latin and published, in 1914, by Paul Peeters.
