= Adarnase I of Tao-Klarjeti =

8th-century nobleman of Iberia

Adarnase (Georgian: ადარნასე) was a late 8th-century nobleman of Iberia (Kartli, modern Georgia) and the founder of the Georgian Bagratid dynasty. He established himself in Tao-Klarjeti as a vassal of the Chosroid dynasty of Iberia and, as a matter of inheritance, acquired more lands, setting stage for the elevation of the Bagratids—in the person of his son Ashot I—to the principate of Iberia.

== Name ==
The name Adarnase derives from Middle Persian Ādurnarsēh, with the second component of the word (Nase) being the Georgian attestation of the Middle Persian name Narseh, which ultimately derives from Avestan nairyō.saŋya-. The Middle Persian name Narseh also exists in Georgian as Nerse. The name Ādurnarsēh appears in the Armenian language as Atrnerseh.

== Origin ==
The medieval Georgian chronicle History of King Vakhtang Gorgasali, attributed to Juansher, relates that the prince (mtavari) Adarnase came to the Georgian Chosroid ruler Archil and asked for land, agreeing in turn to be his vassal. He was given Shulaveri and Artani (modern Ardahan, Turkey). According to the same passage, Adarnase was a descendant of the prophet David and the nephew or – according to another manuscript – grandson of "Adarnase the Blind"; his father was "related to the Bagratids" and had been set up as a duke in the Armenian lands by the Byzantines. Oppressed by the Arab Marwan, he had arrived to the "children of the curopalates Guaram III and remained there."

Professor Cyril Toumanoff assumes that "Adarnase the Blind" in Juansher – who is unattested elsewhere – is a simple error for Ashot III the Blind of Armenia (c. 690 – 762), thus making Adarnase Ashot's grandson, not a nephew, through his son Vasak who might have married the daughter of the Georgian prince Guaram and lived as a fugitive at his court after the disastrous rebellion of Armenian nobility against Arab rule in 772. Vasak is unknown to Georgian records in which the origin of the Georgian Bagratids is largely obscured in favor of the dynasty's claim of Davidic descent. Thus, Sumbat Davitisdze, the 11th-century biographer of the Georgian dynasty, makes only a passing reference to Adarnase and projects, erroneously or intentionally, the arrival of Bagratid forefathers back several centuries earlier.

== Family ==
Adarnase was married to a daughter of Prince Nerse of Iberia with whom he had two children. His son, Ashot, succeeded him in Tao-Klarjeti and went on to become the first Bagratid presiding prince of Iberia. According to the Chronicle of Kartli, Adarnase also had a daughter, Latavri. She married Juansher, a son of the same prince, Archil, from whom Adarnase received land and patronage. Juansher's mother was initially opposed to the marriage, as the chronicle claims, because of her ignorance of the Bagratids' Davidic origin. This dynastic alliance allowed Adarnase to further expand his estates. Archil's territorial holdings had been divided between three heirs; Juansher was one of them. When Juansher died (c. 806), Adarnase inherited Juansher's third through his daughter and combined it with the lands acquired in the lifetime of his son-in-law, thus laying the foundation to the hereditary fiefdom of the Georgian Bagratids in Tao-Klarjeti and Javakheti. Latavri and her late father Adarnase are commemorated in a Georgian inscription from the Kabeni monastery near Akhalgori.
