= Barzabod =

Barzabod was a high-ranking Iranian official in 5th-century Sasanian Iran. A Mihranid prince of the Gardman region, he served as the viceroy of Caucasian Albania.

According to the Georgian chronicler Juansher, Barzabod married off her daughter Sagdukht to his Iberian neighbor, Mihrdat V, then heir apparent to King Archil of Iberia, and eventually king in his own right. The marriage helped to seal peace between the once hostile neighbors. After Archil's death c. 435, Sagdukht relied on her father for support during her regency for her underage son, Vakhtang I of Iberia.

Barzabod died around 440, and was succeeded by his son Varaz-Bakur.

== Sources ==
- Toumanoff, Cyril (1963). Studies in Christian Caucasian history. Georgetown University Press. pp. 1–599.
- Toumanoff, Cyril (1969). "Chronology of the early kings of Iberia". Traditio. 25. Cambridge University Press: 1–33. doi:10.1017/S0362152900010898. JSTOR 27830864. S2CID 151472930. (registration required)
- Rapp, Stephen H. (2014). The Sasanian World through Georgian Eyes: Caucasia and the Iranian Commonwealth in Late Antique Georgian Literature. Ashgate Publishing, Ltd. ISBN 978-1472425522.
- Gamq’relidze, Dmitri (2014). "Juansher Juansheriani, The Life of Vakht'ang Gorgasali". In Jones, Stephen (ed.). Kartlis Tskhovreba. A History of Georgia (PDF). Tbilisi: Artanuji. pp. 78–82. ISBN 978-9941-445-52-1. Archived from the original (PDF) on 2015-07-13.

Preceded by Khurs	Mihranid prince of Gardman; 430–440	Succeeded by Varaz-Bakur
