= Zemo Nikozi church of the Deity =

- ზემო ნიქოზის ღვთაების ეკლესია
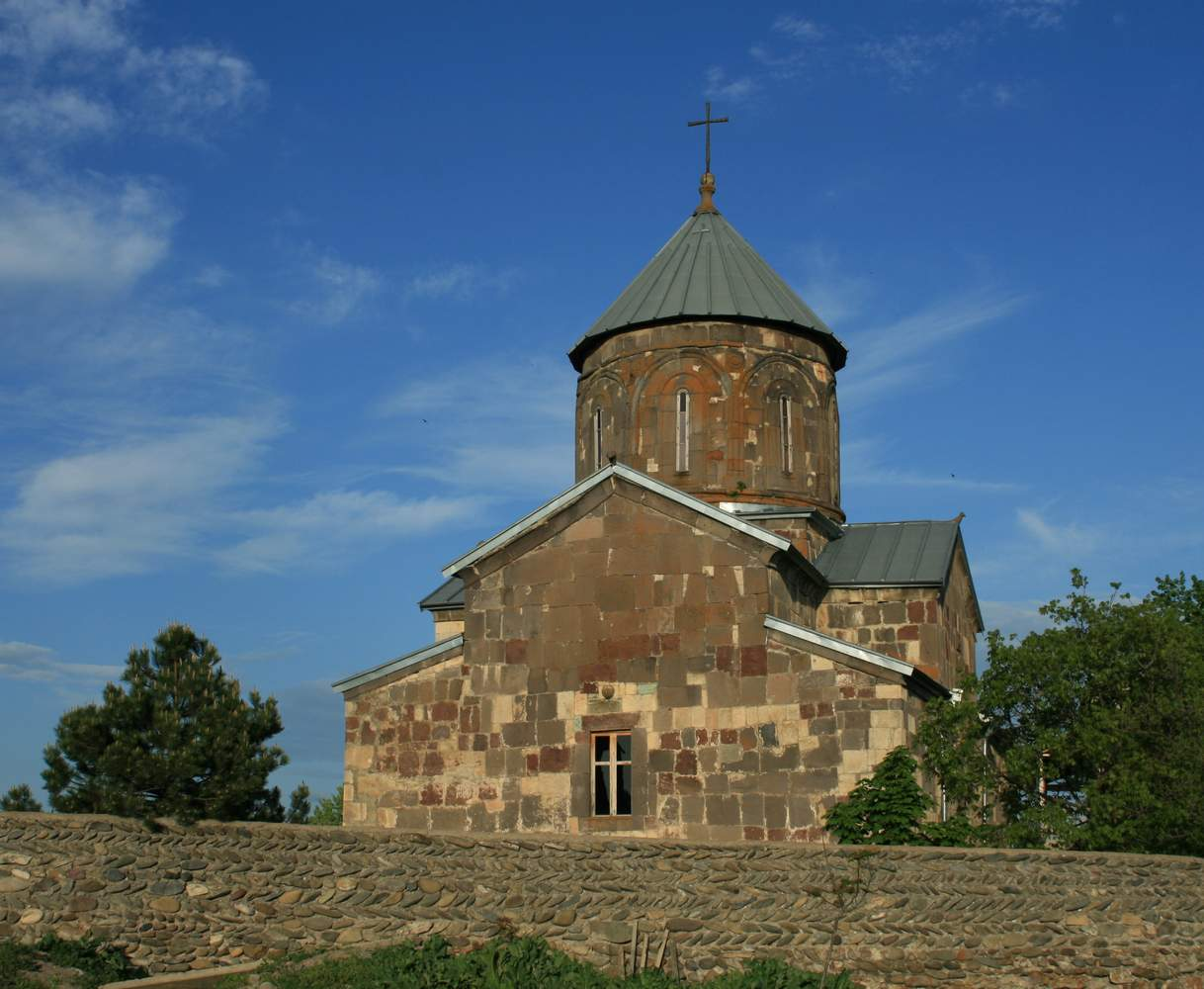
- Zemo Nikozi cathedral of the Deity
- Interactive map of Zemo Nikozi church of the Deity
- Location: Zemo Nikozi, Gori Municipality, Shida Kartli, Georgia
- Coordinates: 42.196159°N 43.958144°E
- Type: Cross-in-square church Bell-tower; Episcopal Palace; Circuit wall

The Zemo Nikozi church of the Deity (Georgian: ზემო ნიქოზის ღვთაების ეკლესია, romanized: zemo nikozis ghvtaebis ek'lesia), also known as Ghvtaeba (ღვთაება), is a medieval Georgian Orthodox cathedral in the Gori Municipality, in Georgia's east-central region of Shida Kartli. It is part of the complex which also includes a bell-tower, an episcopal palace, and a circuit wall. The complex is inscribed on the list of Georgia's Immovable Cultural Monuments of National Significance.

The complex stands in what is now the village of Zemo Nikozi—an "upper" part of the historical settlement of Nikozi—on the right bank of the Greater Liakhvi River, in the immediate proximity of the South Ossetia conflict zone, some 2 km south of the disputed entity's capital of Tskhinvali. The episcopal palace was badly damaged in fighting during the August 2008 Russo-Georgian War and subsequently underwent an emergency stabilization program.

The Zemo Nikozi church is the seat of a bishop of the Georgian Orthodox Eparchy of Nikozi and Tskhinvali, responsible for the territory of South Ossetia. Some 100 m south stands the church of the Archangel, a small 10th-century domed structure.

== History ==
The first recorded mention of Nikozi occurs in a c. 800 chronicle of Juansher, who attributes the founding of the church there and the appointment of a bishop to the 5th-century king Vakhtang Gorgasali: "he built the church of Nik'ozi at the hearth of a fire(-temple), and installed a bishop where was buried the body of St. Ražden, who had been martyred by the Persians in the war with Vaxt'ang." This account is reiterated by the historian Prince Vakhushti of Kartli, writing c. 1745, who adds that a bishop still resided at Nikozi in his day, being "a pastor to the Caucasians, the Dvals, and what is now known as Ossetia, as well as Glola-Ghebi". St. Ražden's martyrium is also mentioned by the anonymous 13th-century Georgian chronicle Histories and Eulogies of the Sovereigns, which relates that one of the sons of "the kings of Ossetians", a disillusioned claimant to the hand of Queen Tamar (r. 1184–1213), died in Nikozi and was buried in its church of St. Ražden.

The Nikozi cathedral and its complex was constructed over a several-century span. The extant church building dates mostly to the 14th–16th century, a bell-tower is a 16th–17th-century structure and an episcopal palace was built in the 9th–11th century. Several other buildings such as a bishop's residence, cells, a refectory, and various accessory structures were constructed in the 19th and 20th centuries.

During the August 2008 Russo-Georgian War, Zemo Nikozi was a scene of heavy fighting between the Georgian and Russian forces and Russian air attacks on 10 August 2008, which damaged the Nikozi complex, especially the recently repaired episcopal palace. Its renovated roof, floor, and balconies were burned down, and the original south floor stones cracked due to fire. Monastic cells, a bishop's dwelling, and the refectory were completely destroyed.

After the war, following an action initiated by the Council of Europe, a project was implemented for emergency stabilization works to the Nikozi complex, including preliminary onsite works, a new roof, consolidation and stabilization of the structure, and archaeological works, setting grounds for further rehabilitation works.

== Architecture ==
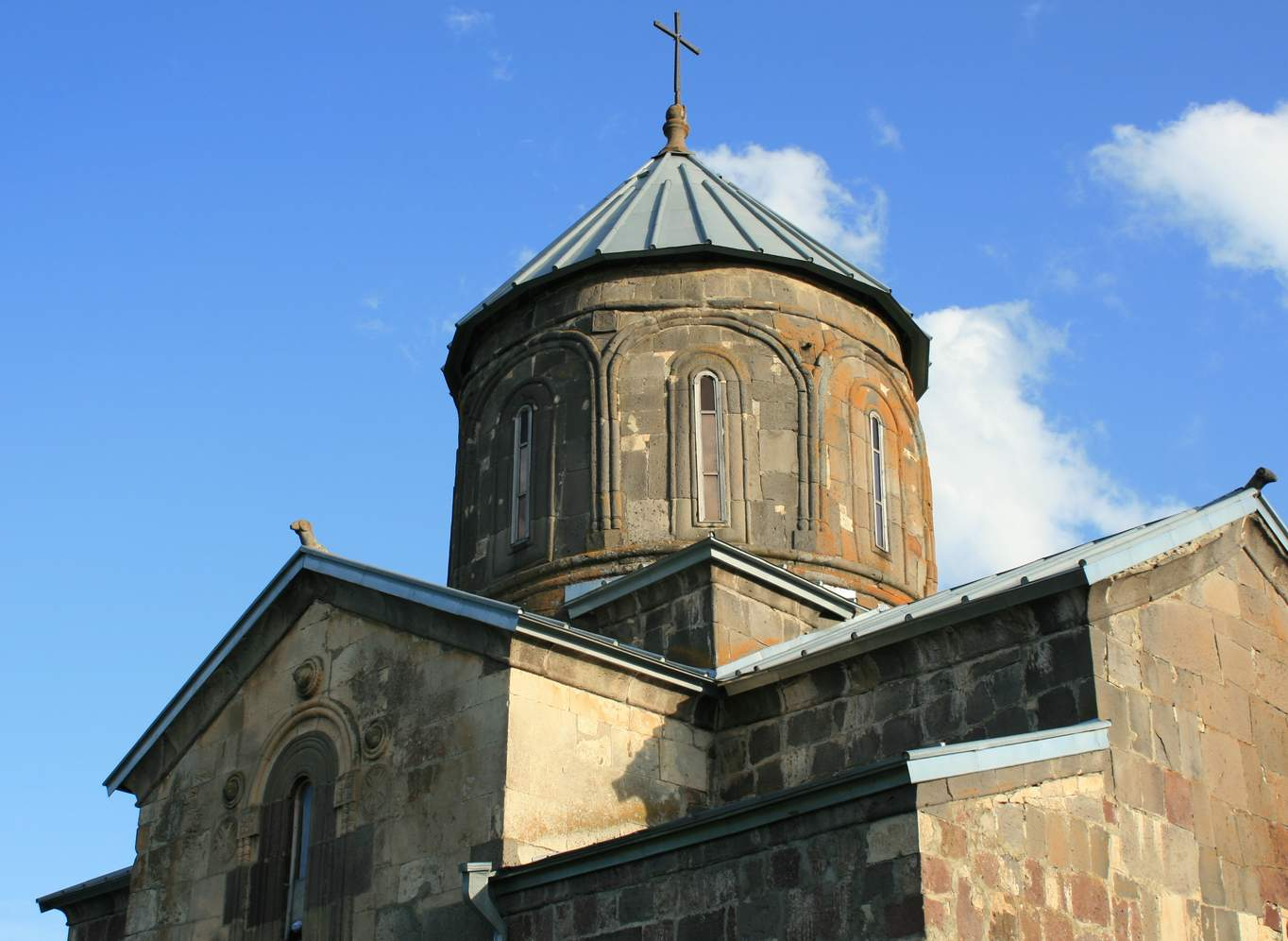
Dome of the church.

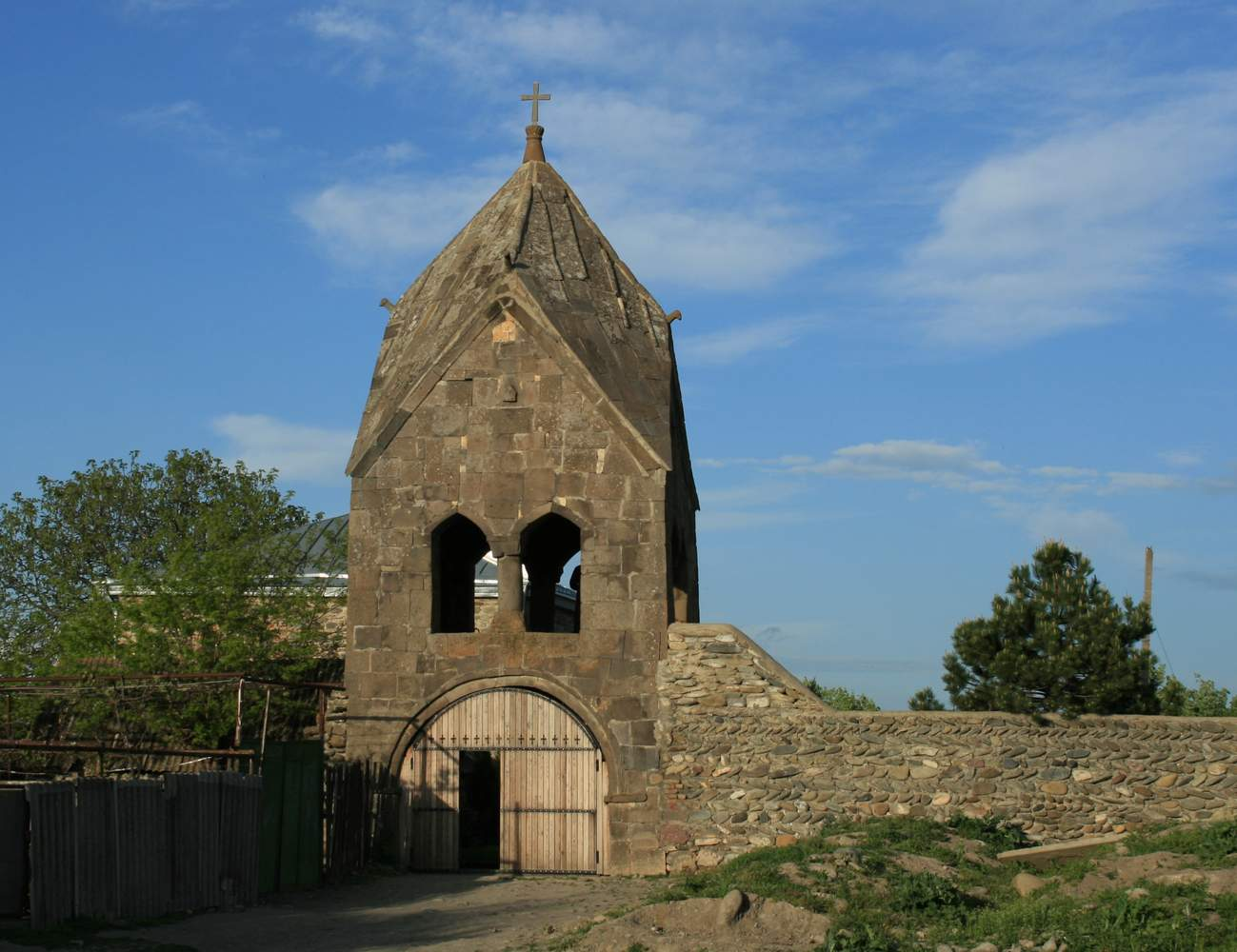
A bell-tower at Nikozi.

As systematic archaeological studies have not been conducted at Nikozi and the church has been remodeled several times in the course of history, neither the fire-temple nor the 5th-century shrine of St. Ražden mentioned in the chronicles has been identified.

The extant cathedral is constructed in a cross-in-square plan, measuring 16.7 × 11.5 m. A three-line inscription in the medieval Georgian asomtavruli script on the south façade identifies Bishop Michael as the builder of the church and is paleographically dated to the 10th century. The church was substantially rebuilt in the 14th to 16th century and further renovated in the 17th and 19th centuries. Both the outer and inner walls of the church are faced with hewn stone slabs. The interior has then been plastered. The entrances are on the west, south, and north, the latter now closed up. The semi-circular apse of the sanctuary is flanked by a rectangular pastophorium on each side. The eastern and western arms of the "cross" are somewhat elongated. Each of the four arms is pierced by a single window. The dome rests upon the corners of the eastern walls and protruding pylons of the western wall. Eight windows punctuate the drum of the dome. The building is capped with coping stones. Stone ram heads are placed on the ridges of all four pediments. The church carries several badly damaged wall inscriptions; one of them, on a stone slab above a window on the east wall, is reconstructed to bear the name of the certain bishop Zachary and is dated to the early Christian period. The remains of an ambulatory are visible on the ground level.

In the northwest corner of the complex stands a 16th–17th-century two-storey bell-tower, measuring 5.45 × 5.35 m., with its façades faced with grey hewn stone slabs. The ground floor acts as a vaulted porch with three bearing arches; the top storey a pyramidal structure containing bells. Façades contain several now barely legible asomtavruli inscriptions. The base between openings is a round pillar adorned with a capital. Each of the four façades of the bell-tower terminates in a gable, the peak of which is topped with a sculpted head of a ram. The bell-tower is flanked on either side by a stone wall, which is a later addition.

An episcopal palace stands in ruins outside the wall, to the southeast. Dated to the 9th–11th century, it is a two-storey building set in a rectangular plan, with the dimensions of 11.2 × 21 m., and built of rubble, ashlars, and brick. The ground floor contains large arched porch and a fireplace; the top one was lit with four arched openings, leading to a wooden balcony.
