= Ateni Sioni Church =

Georgian Orthodox church in Ateni, Georgia

Ateni Sioni Church ატენის სიონი (in Georgian)
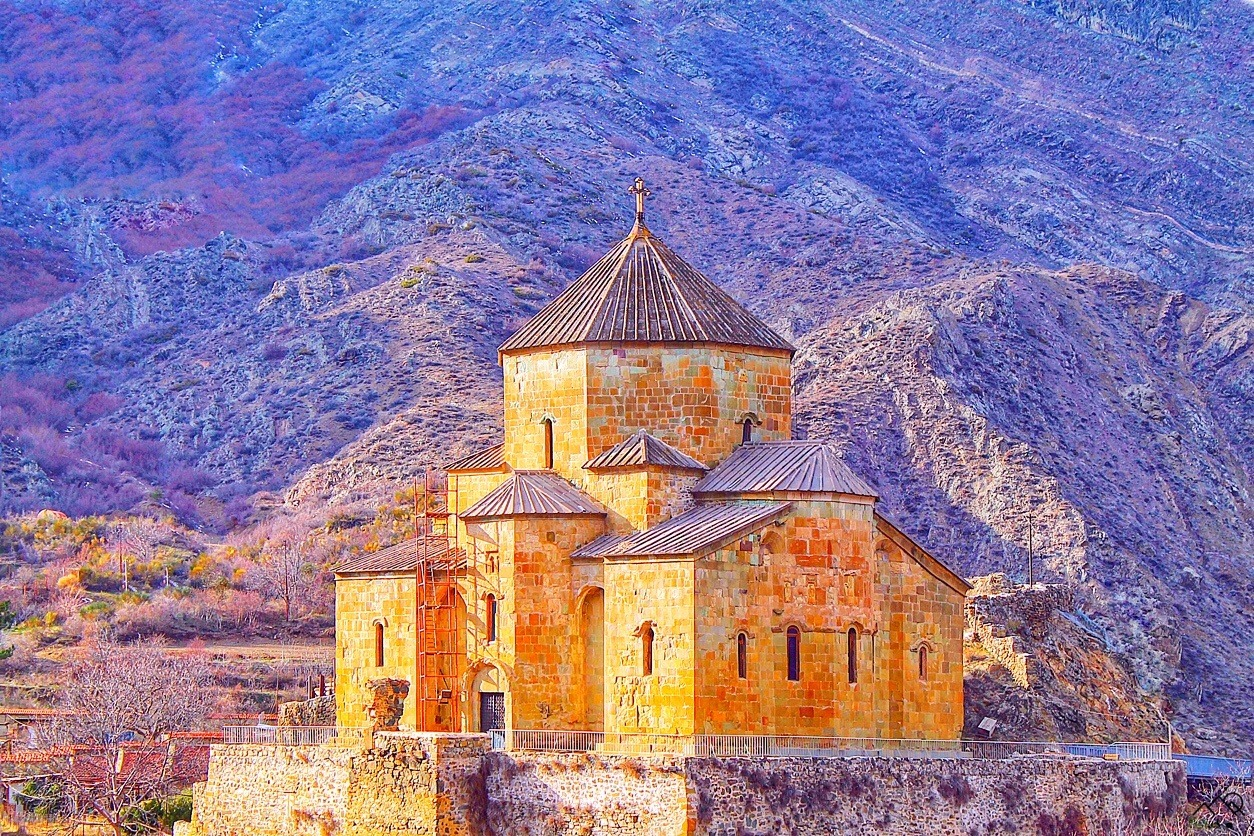
- Ateni Sioni Church.

Religion
- Affiliation: Georgian Orthodox

Location
- Location: Ateni, Gori, Shida Kartli, Georgia
- Interactive map of Ateni Sioni Church ატენის სიონი (in Georgian)
- Coordinates: 41.9039°N 44.0960°E

Architecture
- Type: Church
- Completed: 7th century

The Ateni Sioni Church (Georgian: ატენის სიონი) is an early 7th-century Georgian Orthodox church in the village of Ateni, some 10 km (6.2 mi) south of the city of Gori, Georgia. It stands in a setting of Ateni gorge in the Tana River valley known not only for its historical monuments, but also for its picturesque landscapes and wine. The name "Sioni" derives from Mount Zion at Jerusalem. Ateni is the tetraconch church, typical for the period. Its frescoes are one of the best examples of Georgian painting.

== Architecture ==
Sioni is an early example of a "four-apse church with four niches" domed tetraconch (between the four apses are three-quarter cylindrical niches which are open to the central space), with entrance from the north. The dome tholobate rests on the three rows of tromps, transitioned to the four apses of the tetraconch. The lower tromp is eight-faceted, the middle sixteen- and the upper thirty-two-faceted. The church's cruciform interior measures 24m x 19.22m. Proportional space is perceived entirely, illuminated from the tholobate and apse windows. With restoration of the 10th century the upper parts of the church façades became faced with carved rectangular greenish-gray stones, while the lower still maintain original reddish color of the ashlar, richly decorated with ornaments and figurative reliefs. Position of the reliefs is, however, not well-organized, concentrated on the eastern façade, situated above the precipice and thus not easily observed. The restores reliefs are also more schematic. Original reliefs of the western façade depict deer hunting scene. Artist probably intentionally placed an empty ashlar to show distance of arrow flight. The hunter, riding a horse is dressed like rich person. He just shot an arrow, immediately piercing deer's neck. The other two deer look frightened. Another, shallower, relief is found on the tympanum above the northern entrance. Two deer are drinking from a rounded pool, and the water dynamism is depicted by circles. The relief symbolizes believers drinking from the same source of faith.

The church is not dated but is very similar in design to the Jvari Monastery at Mtskheta, which is generally held to have preceded it, and, hence, has been described by some art historians as belonging to the "Jvari-type" group of churches. Todosak, mentioned in an undated Armenian inscription on the southern facade as "I, Todosak, the builder of this holy church" is considered to have been an Armenian architect Todosak of the original church or its late 10th-century renovator.

== Frescoes ==
The architects were not originally planning frescoes on the inside walls. They appeared only in the second half of the 11th century. It is believed that the walls were painted by a group of at least four artists, who created a monumental harmonious composition. Each apse contains its own iconographic cycle. Dynamic figures are clearly outlined, painted predominantly in light colors - blue, grey, purple. Every fold of clothes is meant to show movement, like in the figure of the angel. The western apse also contains portraits of the kings and nobility who supported the construction.

== Inscriptions ==
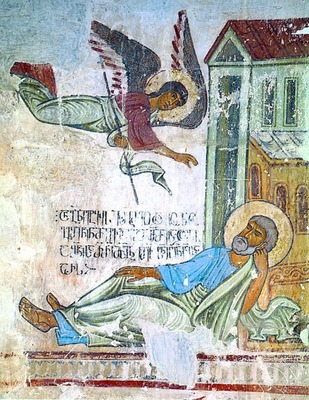
"Joseph's Dream". Mural from Ateni.

The walls of the church contain numerous inscriptions inside and outside, among them the earliest known in Nuskhuri or Nuskha-Khutsuri, one of the versions of the early Georgian alphabet, dating from 835. The earliest known examples of Mkhedruli, a currently used Georgian script, are also found in the Ateni Sioni church and date to the 980s. Many inscriptions describe various historical events. One of the inscriptions on the church commemorates Adarnase I of Tao-Klarjeti, the first documented Georgian Bagratid nobleman who was the father of Ashot I, the founder of the new royal line of Georgia. Other inscription on the southern apse tells about the caliph, who got angry with Tbilisi emir Ishaq ibn Isma'il, sending a large troupe commanded by Bugha al-Kabir. Bugha defeated Ishaq's army and executed Ishaq himself, took over Tbilisi on August 5, 853 and burned the city. Another inscription on the southern facade talks about the King Bagrat IV, who ordered in 1060s to build a city in Ateni, listing all the constructed buildings. Ateni was eventually ruined.

Near the church there are the ruins of the medieval fortified town of Ateni (modern-day villages of Didi Ateni and Patara Ateni).
