= John of Kakheti =

Prince John (Georgian: იოანე ან იოვანე, Ioane or Iovane) was a Georgian prince of royal Chosroid dynasty. He was Prince of Kakheti in 786–790, which he co-ruled with his younger brother Juansher of Kakheti.

He was a son of Prince Archil of Kakheti. Fleeing Arabs, Ioane retired in western Georgia accompanied by his mother and two sisters. Ioane died around 790 leaving no descendants.
