= Zemo Nikozi =

Zemo Nikozi ზემო ნიქოზი
- Location in Georgia
- Country: Georgia
- Region: Shida Kartli
- Municipality: Gori
- Elevation: 850 m (2,790 ft)

Population (2014)
  - Total: 643
- Time zone: UTC+4 (Georgian Time)

Zemo Nikozi (Georgian: ზემო ნიქოზი) is a village in the Shida Kartli region of central Georgia. It is the birthplace of Patriarch Kyrion II of Georgia. Nikozi is one of Georgia's oldest villages and home to early Christian churches and historical monuments. Nikozi was selected for the 5th Animation International Film Festival September. 2015. The Palace was completely destroyed in the Russo-Georgian War, however, the festival has given the area new life and become a cultural centre for the town's youth. Nikozi Art School is in the city.

== See also ==
- Zemo Nikozi church of the Deity
- Zemo Nikozi church of the Archangel

== See also ==
- Shida Kartli
