= Zemo Nikozi church of the Archangel =

Church in Gori, Georgia

- ზემო ნიქოზის მთავარანგელოზის ეკლესია
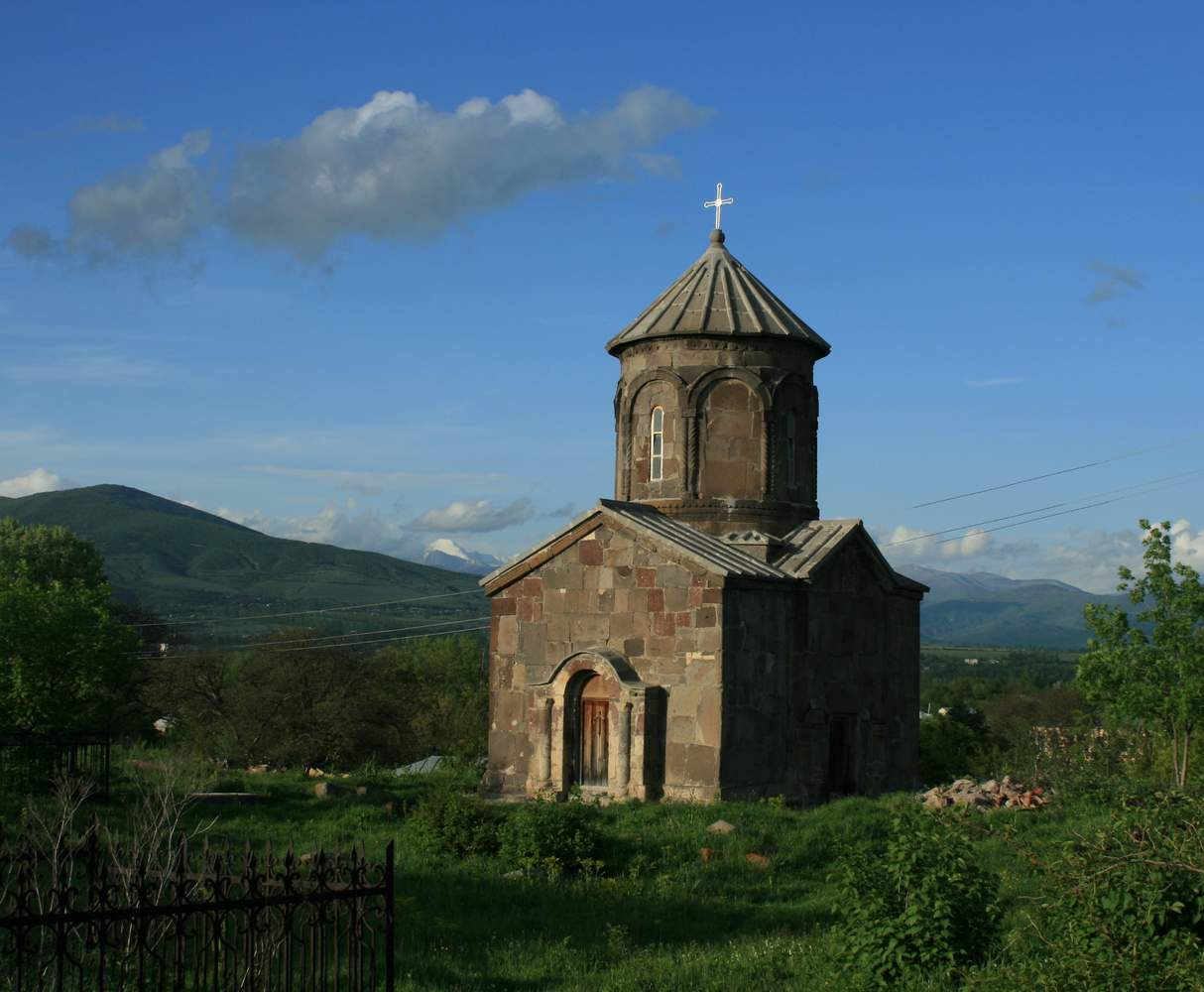
- Zemo Nikozi church of the Archangel
- Interactive map of Zemo Nikozi church of the Archangel
- Location: Zemo Nikozi, Gori Municipality, Shida Kartli, Georgia
- Coordinates: 42.194931°N 43.958457°E
- Type: Cross-in-square church

The Zemo Nikozi church of the Archangel (Georgian: ზემო ნიქოზის მთავარანგელოზის ეკლესია, romanized: zemo nikozis mtavarangelozis ek'lesia) is a 10th-century Georgian Orthodox church in the Gori Municipality, in Georgia's east-central region of Shida Kartli. It is inscribed on the list of Georgia's Immovable Cultural Monuments of National Significance.

A small domed church, it stands in what is now the village of Zemo Nikozi—an "upper" part of the historical settlement of Nikozi—on the right bank of the Greater Liakhvi River, at an old cemetery, some 100 m. south of the Zemo Nikozi church of the Deity. Being in close proximity to the South Ossetia conflict zone, the church survived the August 2008 Russo-Georgian War, which heavily damaged parts of the church of the Deity complex.

== Architecture ==
Zemo Nikozi church of the Archangel is a small domed structure, measuring 8.5 × 5.3 m. It is a form of cross-in-square design, known as kuppelhalle (domed rectangle) and built of neatly dressed grayish basalt stone blocks. The dome rests on pilasters sharply projecting from the longitudinal walls, its drum lit by four windows. The building terminates in a semicircular apse on the east, which has small apsed niches on each side. The transition from the square bay to the dome circle is achieved through squinches and pendentives. The church can be entered through three symmetrically arranged doors in the west, south, and north arms. The doors used to be embellished with semicircular pilasters and arches running above them. The exterior of the dome is adorned with a blind arch supported by a paired colonettes.

The north façade carries a stone carving depicting the equestrian Saint George slaying the dragon and the dome base, to the north, bears three stylized lions carved in relief. A five-line inscription in the medieval Georgian asomtavruli script on the north wall proclaims that the church was built by Bishop Michael (Mikael), who is the same churchman commemorated in an inscription from the church of the Deity. Just above is another inscription, now badly damaged. On a stone above the north window in the dome, between two lion figures, there is the third inscription, arranged in four lines, which mentions Bishop Michael's sisterly nephew, John (Iovane).
