= Gubazes I of Lazica =

Gubazes I გუბაზ I
- King of Lazica
- Reign: fl. 456 – 468
- Successor: Damnazes ?

Map of Lazica in Late Antiquity

Gubazes I (Georgian: გუბაზი; Greek: Γουβάζης) was a king of Lazica who flourished in the 450s and 460s. His relations with the Roman Empire are recorded by Priscus.

Around 456 Gubazes tried to negotiate an alliance with the Sassanid Persians in order to break free from Roman hegemony. In response, in 456, the emperor Marcian dispatched a military expedition against the Lazi, calling upon Gubazes to abdicate or to depose his son, who was his co-ruler, "as it was against tradition to have two joint rulers". Eventually Gubazes abdicated in favor of his son and, in 466, paid a visit to Constantinople, where he had to endure the reprimands of the emperor Leo I, but he was eventually treated with favour and sent back to his homeland, where he seems to have been able to resume his reign. Gubazes' visit to Constantinople is also mentioned in the Life of St. Daniel the Stylite, which reports that Gubazes accompanied Leo to see the renowned monk Daniel, who greatly impressed the Lazic king and even mediated a treaty between the two monarchs.

This period coincided with a campaign launched against Lazica by its eastern neighbour, King Vakhtang I of Iberia, which is narrated in the Georgian Chronicles. Vakhtang was then a Sassanid vassal and his activities in Lazica may have been indirect assistance from the Sassanid shah, as previously offered to Gubazes during his break with Rome.

Around 468 Gubazes, aided by the Romans, attacked the pro-Persian mountainous region of Suania, which had seceded from Lazic overlordship, but, aside from a couple of fortresses, he failed to retake the territory. His failure may have been due to the interference of the Iberians, since the Georgian Chronicles allude to another, in this case victorious, campaign, undertaken by Vakhtang of Iberia in Lazica around this time.

== Notes ==
Unknown	King of Lazica c. 456 – 468	Succeeded by Damnazes ?
