= Stephen of Kakheti =

Prince Stephanoz (Georgian: სტეფანოზ) was a Georgian prince of the royal Chosroid dynasty. He was the Prince of Kakheti from 685 to 736.

He was son of Prince Adarnase II of Iberia.

He had two sons, Prince Archil of Kakheti and Prince Mirian of Kakheti.

Stephen is mentioned in the inscriptions at Ateni Sioni Church dated 735 AD.

კურთხეული მამფალი სტეფანოზ, ღმერთისა მიერ ქართველთა და მეგრელთა ერისთავთერისთავი უფალი.
Blessed Stephen the mampali, by the will of God, the lord and eristavt-eristavi of Georgians and Megrels.
