= Sagdukht =

Sagdukht (Georgian: საგდუხტი) was a 5th-century queen consort of Iberia, natively known as Kartli in eastern Georgia, as the wife of King Mirdat V. She was a daughter of Barzabod, a Mihranid ruler of Gardman.

Sagdukht is primarily known from the Georgian chronicle, written by Juansher c. 800, relating the life of King Vakhtang I, the son of Mirdat and Sagdukht. She is also mentioned as Sahakdukht in the works of the 13th-century Armenian historian Vardan. Modern historians such as Ivane Javakhishvili, Simon Janashia, and Cyril Toumanoff identify her with the Sahakdukht recorded in a Georgian inscription on an icon from the Jvarisa church in the village of Znakva.

According to Juansher's chronicle, Sagdukht's hand was sought and obtained by Mirdat—then heir apparent to his reigning father King Archil—who was captivated by Sagdukht's beauty and also sought to ensure the peace between Iberia and Gardman, the Rani (Arran) of the Georgian source. The couple settled at Mirdat's appanage of Samshvilde, where Sagdukht converted to Christianity and built the church of Sioni. Sagdukht gave birth to two daughters, Khvarandze and Mirandukht, and one son, Vakhtang. After Mirdat's death, Sagdukht assumed regency for her underage son under the protection of her father. Later, according to Juansher, Sagdukht and Khvarandze were temporarily left in the government of Kartli during Vakhtang's absence on a military expedition against the Alans in the Caucasus Mountains.
