= Umayyad invasion of Iberia =

Umayyad invasion of Iberia may refer to:

- Muslim conquest of the Iberian Peninsula (beginning in 711)
- Umayyad invasion of Georgia (735–737)
