= Daniel the Stylite =

Christian saint (c. 409 – 493)

Saint Daniel the Stylite
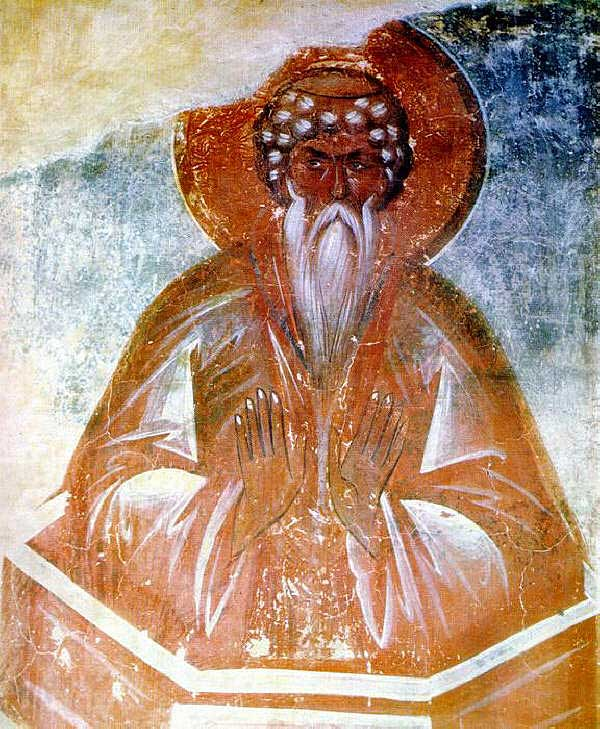
- 14th-century fresco of Daniel by Theophanes the Greek
- Born: Maratha (near modern-day Samsat, Adıyaman, Turkey)
- Venerated in: Eastern Orthodoxy Eastern Catholic Church Roman Catholic Church
- Feast: December 11

Daniel the Stylite (Greek: Δανιὴλ ὁ στυλίτης, c. 409 – 493) is a saint and stylite of the Eastern Orthodox, Roman Catholic and Eastern Catholic Churches. He is commemorated on 11 December according to the liturgical calendars of these churches.

== History ==
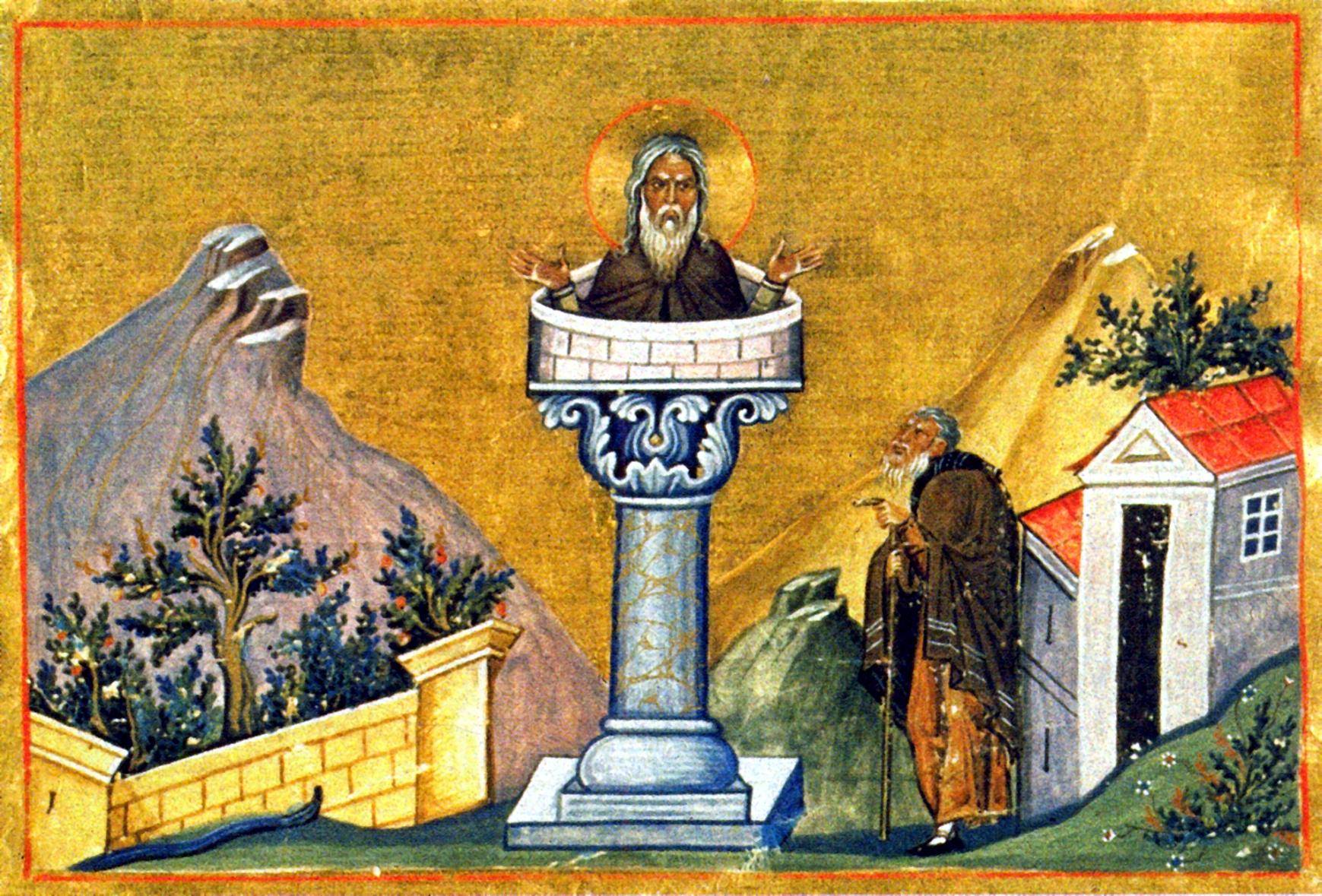
Daniel the Stylite, as depicted in the 11th century Menologion of Basil II

=== Early life ===
Daniel was born in Maratha, a village in Upper Mesopotamia near Samosata in present-day Turkey. He entered a monastery at the age of 12 and lived there until he was thirty-eight. During a voyage he made with his abbot to Antioch, he passed by the city of Telanissos (today Deir Semaan) and received the benediction and encouragement of Simeon the Stylite. Then he visited various holy places, stayed in various convents, and retired in 451 AD into the ruins of a pagan temple.

=== Stylite ===
Daniel established his pillar north of Constantinople. The owner of the land where he placed his pillars had not been consulted, hence he appealed to the Byzantine emperor Leo I and patriarch Gennadius of Constantinople. The emperor proposed to dislodge him, but was deterred through unknown means. Gennadius ordained Daniel as a priest. When the ceremony was over, the patriarch administered the Eucharist by means of a ladder, which Daniel had ordered to be brought. Gennadius then received the Eucharist from Daniel. People from all over came to see him and touch his pillar, which healed the faithful. Daniel stood through rain, snow, and the freezing cold.

Daniel lived on the pillar for 33 years. Due to continuous standing, his feet were reportedly covered with sores, cuts, and ulcers, and the winds of Thrace sometimes stripped him of his scanty clothing.

He was visited by both Emperor Leo I the Thracian—accompanied by King Gubazes I of Lazica—and Emperor Zeno. As a theologian, he came out against monophysitism.

== Associated prayers ==
The following is his prayer before he began his life on the pillar:

I yield Thee glory, Jesus Christ my God, for all the blessings which Thou hast heaped upon me, and for the grace which Thou hast given me that I should embrace this manner of life. But Thou knowest that in ascending this pillar, I lean on Thee alone, and that to Thee alone I look for the happy issue of mine undertaking. Accept, then, my object: strengthen me that I finish this painful course: give me grace to end it in holiness.

The following is the advice he gave to his disciples just before his death:

Hold fast humility, practice obedience, exercise hospitality, keep the fasts, observe the vigils, love poverty, and above all maintain charity, which is the first and great commandment; keep closely bound to all that regards piety, avoid the tares of the heretics. Separate never from the Church your Mother; if you do these things your righteousness shall be perfect.

== See also ==
- Simeon Stylites
- Pole-sitting
- Hermit
- Ascetic
