= Damnazes =

- King of Lazica
- Reign: ? – 522
- Predecessor: Gubazes I ?
- Successor: Tzath I

Map of Lazica and surrounding regions in Late Antiquity

Damnazes (Georgian: დამნაზე; Greek: Δαμνάζης; died 522) was a 6th-century king of Lazica (western Georgia), a contemporary of the Sassanid king of Iran Kavadh I. Damnazes, like other kings of Late Antique Lazica, is mentioned by the contemporary chronicles in the context of the rivalry between the Eastern Roman (Byzantine) Empire and Sassanid Iran in the Caucasus.

Damnazes was the father and predecessor of Tzathius, king of the Lazi according to the Byzantine historian John Malalas. The anonymous Chronicon Paschale (Chron. Pasch. s.a. 522) renders his name as Zamnaxes. According to a genealogical hypothesis by Professor Cyril Toumanoff, Damnazes might have been a son of the Lazic king Gubazes I, who is known to have had his son as co-ruler c. 456.

Damnazes was a subject of the Sassanid king and, although ruling over a Christian country, professed Zoroastrianism. On his death, his son and successor, Tzathius, rejected an Iranian coronation and repaired to Constantinople to have his accession validated by the Byzantine emperor Justin I.

== Sources ==
- Martindale, John Robert; Jones, Arnold Hugh Martin; Morris, J., eds. (1980). The Prosopography of the Later Roman Empire, Volume II: A.D. 395–527. Cambridge, United Kingdom: Cambridge University Press. ISBN 978-0-521-20159-9.
- Toumanoff, Cyril (1980). "How Many Kings Named Opsites?". In Coddington, John Insley; Thompson, Neil D.; Anderson, Robert Charles (eds.). A Tribute to John Insley Coddington on the Occasion of the Fortieth Anniversary of the American Society of Genealogists. Association for the Promotion of Scholarship in Genealogy.

Preceded by Gubazes I ?	King of Lazica fl. 522	Succeeded by Tzath I
