= Mirian of Kakheti =

Prince Mirian or Mihr (Georgian: მირიანი; მირი) was a Georgian prince of the royal Chosroid dynasty reigning between 736 and 741.

== Life ==
He was son of Prince Stephen of Kakheti and brother of Prince Archil of Kakheti. According to the chronicle his father divided between his two sons the royal treasure of silver and gold jewels before taking refuge to Colchis (Western Georgia). The second half of the royal treasury was left to his second son, the future ruler Archil of Kakheti "the Martyr", who remained in Kakheti. The reign of Mirian was brief. He was seriously injured in a fight against the Arab forces, he died, leaving the throne to his brother.

== Family ==
Mirian had 7 daughters. Future husbands for his daughters had been assigned by his brother Archil. Names of most of the princesses are not known.

- anonymous daughter, wife of Guaram IV of Iberia
- anonymous daughter, wife of Pitiakhsh (Arshusha VI?), a descendant of Peroz, Duke of Trialeti
- anonymous daughter, wife of Nersianid Prince Nerse I Nersiani. They had son Adarnase III of Iberia.
- anonymous daughter, wife of Adarnase Adarnasiani
- anonymous daughter, wife of Duke Varazman
- anonymous daughter, wife of Juansher Juansheriani
- Gurandukht, wife of Leon I of Abkhazia
