= Ateni (Georgia) =

Village in Georgia (country)

Coordinates: 41°54′N 44°06′E

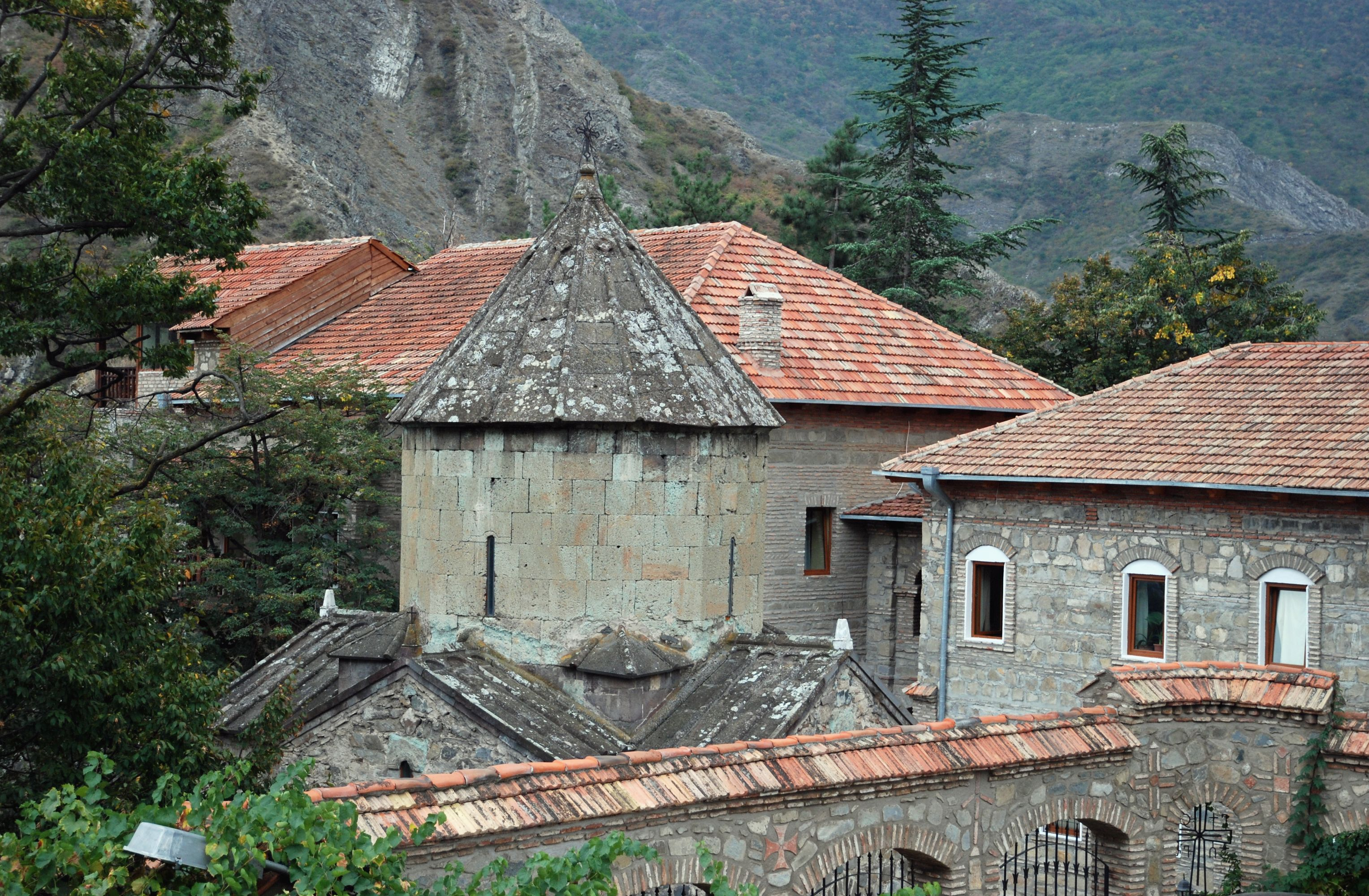
Kleine Athens-Church in Didi Athens

Ateni (Georgian: ატენი) was a medieval city in Georgia, in the valley of the Tana river, on both banks of the river. Ateni was built in the 11th century by the Georgian king Bagrat IV. The city was secured with three fortresses located near Ateni: Ateni fortress, Vere fortress and Dektsikhe. In the 13th–17th centuries Ateni was still considered an important place in the country but in the 18th century it began decreasing in importance and gradually the town became a village.

Today is in the area of Ateni there are two Georgian villages: Didi Ateni and Patara Ateni. They belong to the Gori District, Shida Kartli region.

== Bibliography ==
- Georgian Soviet Encyclopedia, D. Berdzenishvili, I, p. 666, Tbilisi, 1975
