= Ateni gorge =

Gorge in Georgia

- Tana gorge
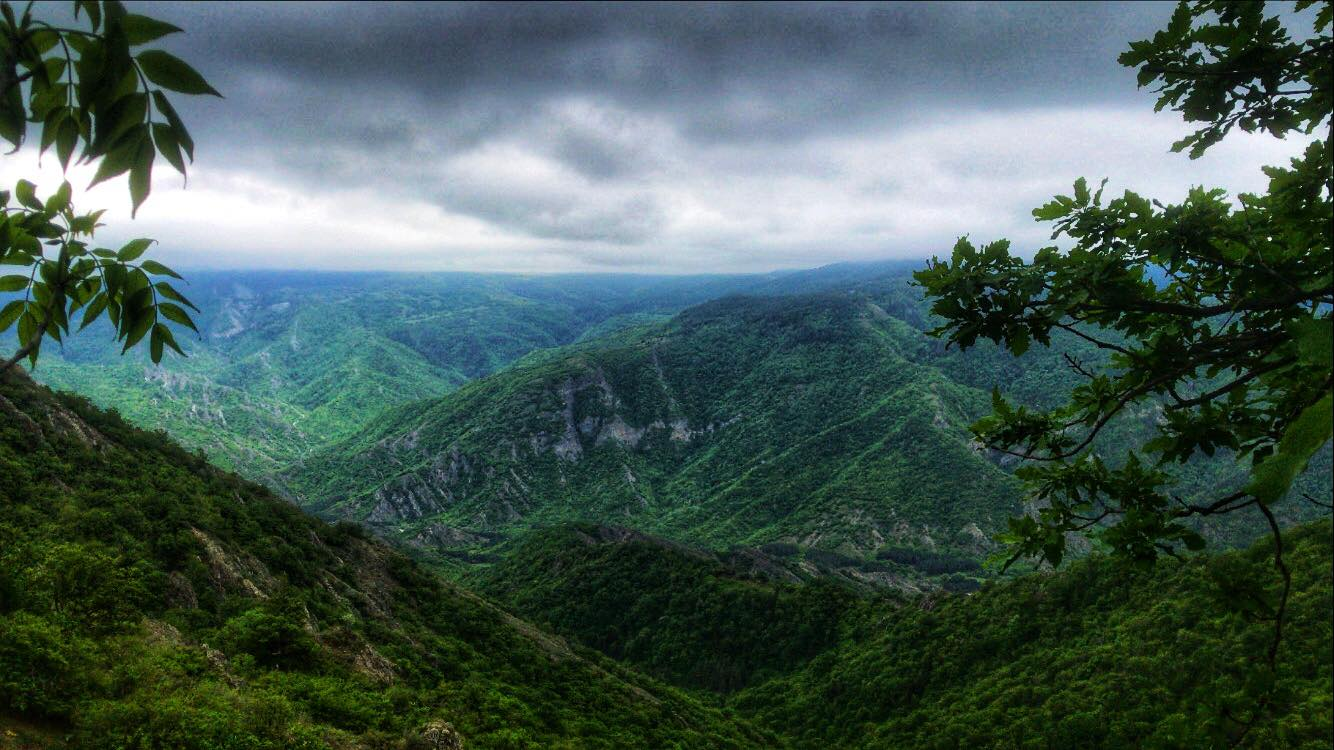

- Location within Shida Kartli Location within Georgia

Naming
- Native name: ატენის ხეობა (Georgian)

Geography
- Country: Georgia Georgia
- State/Province: Shida Kartli
- Population center: Gori
- Coordinates: 41°55′2.46″N 44°6′0.54″E
- River: Tana River
- Interactive map of Ateni gorge

Ateni gorge is a gorge in the valley of Tana River (sometimes also called Tana gorge) in northern spurs of Trialeti Range of the Lesser Caucasus mountains. It is situated about 8 km south of the city of Gori in Shida Kartli region of the Republic of Georgia.

The gorge has a number of architectural monuments. Among them Ateni Sioni Church of the 7th century, Ateni fortress of at least 10th century, and a small church of the 7th-9th century. A historical town of Ateni was built in the 11th century, but later completely destroyed.
