= Latavri of Tao-Klarjeti =

Georgian princess

Princess Latavri (Georgian: ლატავრი, romanized: lat'avri, c. 755) was a Georgian princess of the Bagrationi dynasty of Tao-Klarjeti branch.

She was a daughter of Adarnase I of Tao-Klarjeti and sister of King Ashot I of Iberia.

She married Prince Juansher, son of Prince Archil of Kakheti.

Juansher’s mother was initially opposed to the marriage. According to the chronicle:

ხოლო ამან ჯუანშერ შეირთო ცოლი ნათესავი ბაგრატონიანთა, ასული ადარნასესი, სახელით ლატავრი, და აბრალა დედამან მისმან მოყვანება მისი ცოლად: არა-თუ-რე კეთილად მეცნიერი იყო, ვითარმედ არიან იგინი ნათესავნი დავით წინასწარმეტყუელისანი, რომელი-იგი ჴორციელად მამად ღმრთისად იწოდა. და ვითარ იხილა ძის ცოლი თჳსი, შეუყუარდა, აკურთხა და დალოცა.
And this Juansher married Bagrationi, daughter of Adarnase, named Latavri, and mother of his blamed him for marrying her, but she did not know well that they are the relatives of Prophet David who was the lord. And when she saw a wife of her son, loved her and blessed her.
