= Juansher of Kakheti =

Prince Juansher II (Georgian: ჯუანშერ II) was a Georgian prince of royal Chosroid dynasty. Prince of Kakheti in 786-807.

He was a son of Prince Archil of Kakheti. Juansher II married in 790 Princess Latavri of Tao-Klarjeti, daughter of Adarnase I of Tao-Klarjeti.

The couple remained childless after the death of Juansher in 807. Juansher received the title of Prince of Iberia which was recognized by his brother-in-law Ashot I of Iberia.
