= Umayyad invasion of Georgia =

735 invasion

- Part of the early Muslim conquests
- Georgia and the Caucasus just before the invasion.
| Date | 735–737 |
| Location | Caucasus |
| Result | Umayyad victory |

Belligerents
| Principality of Iberia; Principality of Abasgia; Duchy of Argveti | Umayyad Caliphate |

Commanders and leaders
| Archil of Kakheti; Mirian of Kakheti; Leon I of Abasgia | Marwan ibn Muhammad |

The Umayyad invasion of Georgia, known in Georgian historiography as the Invasion of Marwan the Deaf (Arabic: ٱلْفَتْحُ ٱلْأُمَوِيُّ لِجُورْجِيَا ; Georgian: მურვან ყრუს შემოსევა, romanized: murvan q'rus shemoseva), took place from 735 to 737, and was initiated by the Umayyad prince and future caliph, Marwan ibn Muhammad, against the Principality of Iberia. The goals of the campaign are disputed among historians. Georgian historiography insists its main purpose was to finally break the stiff Georgian resistance against Arab rule, however, Western historians such as Cyril Toumanoff and Ronald Suny view it as a general campaign directed at both the Byzantine Empire, which exerted its domination over Western Georgia, and the Khazars, whose repeated raids affected not only Iberia (Eastern Georgia) and the whole Caucasus, but had reached Arab lands all the way to Mosul in 730.

== Invasion ==
The invasion was led by Marwan ibn Muhammad, who later became the last Umayyad caliph Marwan II. In 735, he arrived with a large army that prompted the Khazar khagan to convert to Islam and join the campaign. Kartli and Kakheti experienced the greatest devastation. Marwan depopulated Kakhetia and resettled it with 20,000 Slavic households. When the settlers subsequently killed their leader and fled, Marwan pursued and decimated them. Refugees migrated up the Kura valley and westward into the Klarjeti mountains.

Guaram III (also identified as Mihr or Archil) abandoned resistance and withdrew southwest with his followers. Marwan pursued him into Lazica, inflicting considerable destruction. In Argveti, local rulers Davit and Konstantin resisted but were captured and executed near Kutaisi for refusing to convert to Islam. According to The Life of Georgia, Arab forces reached Abkhazia but were repelled at Anakopia by the defense and an outbreak of dysentery. King Mihr is said to have died at Anakopia.

== Legacy ==
Marwan's ruthlessness was epitomized by the fact that the Georgians called him Murvan Qru ("Marwan the Deaf"). After his campaign, most major settlements were ruined and people faced starvation. If Georgian historiography insists that Kartli was devastated by the invasion, Toumanoff, relying on local and Arab sources, claims that most of the damage in the Eastern part of the country was actually the result of the previous Khazar raids, and that the local Georgian prince, Guaram III of Iberia, actually sided with the Arabs in order to repeal the Khazars beyond the Main Caucasian Range.

In any case, the Arab intervention gave them more power over Iberia than they had managed to attain in almost a century of previous conquests. They established the Emirate of Tbilisi to exert direct control over Iberia, even though the Principate of Iberia was not abolished, and the local nobility retained most of its power. Due to civil unrest and the fact that foreign enemies were plaguing the caliphate, it was unable to launch another invasion and, until 786, settled upon receiving irregular tributes from the Georgian local princes.
