= Mihrdat V =

King of Iberia, an ancient Georgian state

King of Iberia
- Reign: c. 435 – c. 447
- Predecessor: Archil
- Successor: Vakhtang I
- Died: c. 447
- Spouse: Sagdukht
- Issue: Vakhtang I
- Dynasty: Chosroid dynasty
- Father: Archil

Mihrdat V (Georgian: მირდატ V, Latinized as Mithridates), of the Chosroid Dynasty, was the king (mepe) of Iberia (Kartli, eastern Georgia) reigning, according to a medieval Georgian literary tradition, for 12 years, from c. 435 to 447 (according to Cyril Toumanoff).

Mihrdat was the son and successor of King Archil. The Georgian annals praise Mihrdat for his piety, but provide no details about his reign. He was married to Sagdukht, daughter of Barzabod, Mihranid prince of Gardman, and fathered Vakhtang, his successor.

Preceded by Archil	King of Iberia; 435–447	Succeeded by Vakhtang I
