= Balendukht =

Sasanian princess and queen consort of Iberia (fl. c. 450 CE)

Balendukht or Balendokht (Georgian: ბალენდუხტი) (fl. c. 450 CE) was a Sasanian princess and queen consort of Iberia. She was the daughter of Sasanian shah (king) Hormizd III. During her youth, she married Vakhtang I, the ruler of Iberia, with whom she had one child named Dachi. Balendukht, however, died in childbirth.

The etymology of her name is unclear. It may have been a corrupted from *Šāhēnduxt.
