= Archil of Kakheti =

Archil
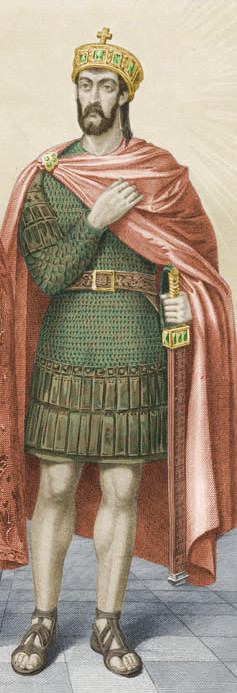
- St. Archil by Mikhail Sabinin

Erismtavari of Kartli / Prince of Kakheti
- Reign: 736–786
- Predecessor: Stephen of Kakheti
- Successor: Ioanne and Juansher
- Born: Kingdom of Iberia
- Died: 786
- Issue: Juansher of Kakheti; Prince Ioane; Princess Gurandukht; Princess Mariam; Princess Mirandukht; Princess Susan
- Dynasty: Chosroid dynasty
- Father: Stephen of Kakheti
- Religion: Georgian Orthodox Church

Prince Archil the Martyr (Georgian: არჩილი) was an 8th-century Georgian Orthodox Christian royal prince of the eastern Georgian region of Kakheti.

== Life ==
Archilʼs biography is related in the medieval corpus of Georgian chronicles known as The Life of Kartli. One of its parts, the c. 800 history by Pseudo-Juansher, terminates with a brief account of Archilʼs tenure as prince, while another one – The Martyrdom of Archil, a brief text of uncertain age (between early 9th and late 11th centuries) inserted just after Ps.-Juansherʼs chronicle – narrowly focuses on Archilʼs martyrdom.

Archil was a scion of the former royal dynasty of Iberia (Kartli), the Chosroid dynasty and a son of Prince Stephen of Kakheti (r. 685–736). His rule coincided with the Arab conquests in Caucasia. The 735-737 expedition by Marwan ibn Muhammad forced Archil and his brother Mirian to flee to the west through Egrisi into Abasgia where they joined the local dynast Leon I in the defense of Anacopia against the invading Arabs. Returning to Kakheti, Archil launched a program of reconstruction and Christianization of his mountainous pagan subjects. The Georgian texts also relate the rise of the Georgian Bagratids, a future royal dynasty, during the time of Archil.

Around 786, eastern Georgia was subjected to another Arab invasion, this time led by Khuzayma ibn Khazim, who had been reconfirmed as viceroy of Arab-controlled Caucasia (Armīniya) by the caliph al-Hadi (r. 785–786). Archil, in an untenable situation, pleaded for peace. Khuzayma b. Khazim promised Archil gifts in return for his acceptance of Islam, but the prince refused and was condemned to prison. Then the viceroy was informed of Archil being a descendant of the Chosroid kings who allegedly knew the location of a treasure hidden by the Byzantine emperor Heraclius while evacuating Caucasia in the 620s.

Archil has been canonized by the Georgian Orthodox Church which commemorates him on June 21 (N.S. July 4).

== Family ==
Archil was survived by two sons, Juansher and Iovane (John) and four daughters: Guarandukht, Mariam, Mirandukht and Shushan. Upon Archilʼs death, Iovane evacuated to Egrisi while Juansher remained in Kakheti and later married Princess Latavri of Tao-Klarjeti of the Bagrationi dynasty.

== Notes ==
Preceded by Stepanoz II	Prince of Kakheti; 736–786	Succeeded by Ioanne and Juansher
