= Archil I =

King of Iberia, an ancient Georgian state

King of Iberia
- Reign: c. 411 – c. 435
- Predecessor: Mihrdat IV
- Successor: Mihrdat V
- Died: c. 435
- Issue: Mihrdat V
- Dynasty: Chosroid dynasty
- Father: Mihrdat IV

Archil I (Georgian: არჩილ I), of the Chosroid Dynasty, was the king (mepe) of Iberia (Kartli, eastern Georgia) from c. 411 to 435. He was the son and successor of King Mirdat IV.

== Biography ==
The two principal medieval Georgian chronicles – The Conversion of Kartli, and The Life of Kartli, – relate conflicting versions of Archil's reign. The former story is extremely brief but complains that the positions of Zoroastrianism, an official Sasanian religion, was firm in Christian Iberia, a testimony to the effectively unchallenged Sasanid hegemony over the country. The other chronicle informs us of Archil's successful rebellion against Iran, his victory over a punitive force and a retaliatory raid into Arran. The authenticity of this latter account has been questioned by modern scholars.

Arch'il is also attested in two Armenian sources: Koryun’s The Life of Mashtots, cap. 18; and Moses of Chorene, III.60.

| Preceded by Mirdat IV | King of Iberia; 411–435 | Succeeded by Mirdat V |
