= The Georgian Chronicles =

Principal compendium of medieval Georgian historical texts

The Georgian Chronicles, Queen Mariam's version

The Georgian Chronicles, Queen Ana's version

The Georgian Chronicles is the principal compendium of medieval Georgian historical texts, natively known as The Life of Kartli (Georgian: ქართლის ცხოვრება, romanized: kartlis tskhovreba)—Kartli being a core region of ancient and medieval Georgia, known to the Classical and Byzantine authors as Iberia.

The chronicles are also known as The Georgian Royal Annals, for they were essentially the official corpus of history of the Kingdom of Georgia.

== Chronicles ==
The Chronicles consist of a series of distinct texts dating from the 9th to the 14th century. The dating of these works as well as the identification of their authors (e.g., Leonti Mroveli and Juansheriani) have been a subject of scholarly debates. Although many scholars in Georgia still propose an 11th-century dating for the first redaction of the corpus, the increasing number of modern experts has accepted Professor Cyril Toumanoff's hypothesis that the earliest texts of Kartlis Tskhovreba were composed c. 800. The latest texts were added in the 14th century. A "canonized" version was edited by a special commission appointed and chaired by King Vakhtang VI early in the 18th century.

During the 11th century, the first three works – the "History of the Kings and Patriarchs of the Georgians", the "History of King Vakhtang Gorgasali", and the "Martyrdom of Saint Archil" – already made up a first corpus which covered the Georgian history from the earliest times through the reign of Vakhtang I Gorgasali (r. 452–502/22) down to the death of Vakhtang's descendant Archil (786). In the middle of the 12th century, two texts were added: the "Chronicle of Kartli" – which records the Georgian history from the late 8th century through the reign of the first all-Georgian king Bagrat III (r. 1008–1014) to the early regnal years of George II (r. 1072–1089) – and the "History of the King of Kings David" – which continues the story and focuses on the reign of David IV (r. 1089–1125).

== Manuscripts ==
The extant Georgian manuscripts of Kartlis Tskhovreba are relatively late, with the earliest, the so-called Anaseuli or "Queen Anna" codex, dating from the period of 1479–1495. Another major variant, Mariamiseuli or "Queen Mariam" codex, was copied in the years 1633–1645/1646. However, the surviving Georgian manuscripts are predated by the Chronicles' abridged Armenian adaptation known as "The History of Georgians" (Patmut'iwn Vrats'), most probably made in the 12th century, with its earliest extant manuscript being copied in the period of 1279–1311.

A number of translations are available in French, Russian, English and German, but each one covers only a selected number of these texts.

== Authenticity ==
Some modern scholars, such as Ivane Javakhishvili, have questioned the authenticity of the early components of The Georgian Chronicles and have called for extreme caution when working with them. Indeed, strict historical facts are frequently intermingled with mythical ones, making it sometimes difficult to discern true historiography and mythology. However, critical analyses against other sources, including the Classical authors, and a series of recent archaeological studies have proved the trustworthiness of many of the Chronicles' accounts. These texts relate evidence not only for the history of Georgia, but also Armenia and the Caucasus in general, Iran, Syria, Anatolia, the Roman Empire, the Khazars, and the Turks.

== Components ==
English name	Georgian name	Transliteration	Date	Author	Period covered
History of the Kings and Patriarchs of the Georgians	ცხოვრება ქართუელთა მეფეთა და პირველთაგანთა მამათა და ნათესავთა	tskhovreba kartuelta mepeta da pirveltaganta mamata da natesavta	9th or 11th century	Leonti Mroveli (?)	4th century BC – 5th century AD
History and Life of King Vakhtang Gorgasali	ცხოვრება და მოქალაქეობა ვახტანგ გორგასლისა	tskhovreba da mokalakeoba vakhtang gorgaslisa	c. 800 or 11th century	Juansher Juansheriani	5th–8th centuries
Martyrdom of Holy and Magnificent Archil	წამება წმიდისა და დიდებულისა არჩილისი	tsameba tsmidisa da didebulisa archilisi	9th or 11th century	Juansheriani or Mroveli	736–786
Chronicle of Kartli	მატიანე ქართლისა	matiane kartlisa	11th century	Anonymous	786–1072
History of the King of Kings David	ცხოვრება მეფეთ მეფისა დავითისი	tskhovreba mepet mepisa davitisi	12th century	Anonymous	1072–1125
History of the Bagratids	ცხოვრება და უწყება ბაგრატონიანთა	tskhovreba da utsqeba bagratonianta	11th century	Sumbat Davitis-Dze	6th century–1031
Histories and Eulogies of the Sovereigns	ისტორიანი და აზმანი შარავანდედთანი	istoriani da azmani sharavandedtani	13th century	Archbishop-Chancellor Theodore of Chqondidi	1156–1212
History of the Five Reigns (also called the Chronicle of Giorgi Lasha)	ლაშა-გიორგის დროინდელი მატიანე	lasha-giorgis droindeli matiane	1223	Historian of George IV	1125–1223
History of the King of Kings Tamar	ცხოვრება მეფეთ მეფისა თამარისი	tskhovreba mepet mepisa tamarisi	1210–1213	Basili, Master of the Court	1184–1210/1213
Chronicle of a Hundred Years	ასწლოვანი მატიანე	astslovani matiane	14th century	Anonymous	1212–1318

== See also ==
- Conversion of Kartli (chronicle)
- Divan of the Abkhazian Kings

== Bibliography ==
- Bibliography of The Georgian Chronicles
