= Gori Municipality =

Coordinates: 41.9667°N 44.1000°E

Gori Municipality გორის მუნიციპალიტეტი
- Municipality
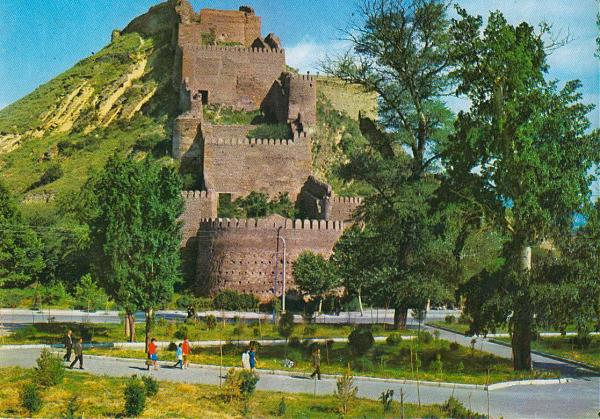
- Gori Fortress

- Flag Seal

- Location of Gori Municipality in Georgia
- Interactive map of Gori Municipality
- Country: Georgia
- Region: Shida Kartli
- Capital: Gori
- various: 1 town, 115 villages

Government
  - Mayor: Vladimer Khinchegashvili

Area
  - Total: 1,352 km^{2} (522 sq mi)

Population (2025)
  - Total: 113,700
  - Density: 84.10/km^{2} (217.8/sq mi)
- Time zone: UTC+4
- Website: Official site of shida kartli region

Gori (Georgian: გორის მუნიციპალიტეტი, Goris municiṗaliṫeṫi) is a district of Georgia, in the region of Shida Kartli. After abolishment of former South Ossetian Autonomous Oblast, the Gori District included the territory of the former Tskhinvali District. Some northern territories of the district are part of a self-proclaimed republic of South Ossetia and have not been under control of the Georgian government since 1992. It is bordered by the municipalities of Kaspi to the east, Borjomi and Tsalka to the south, and Kareli to the west. The area of Gori municipality is 1352 km2 and the population is 125,692 people. The administrative center of the municipality is the city of Gori.

== Politics ==
Gori Municipal Assembly (Georgian: გორის საკრებულო) is a representative body in Gori Municipality. currently consisting of 36 members. The council assembles into session regularly, to consider subject matters such as code changes, utilities, taxes, city budget, oversight of city government and more. Gori sakrebulo is elected every four years. The last election was held in October 2021.

Party	2017	2021	Current Municipal Assembly
Georgian Dream	31	22	
United National Movement	3	9	
For Georgia	1 (Note: Split from GD.)	3	
People's Power		2 (Note: Split from GD.)	
European Georgia	2		
Development Movement	1		
Alliance of Patriots	1		
Independent	1		
Total	40	36	

== Administrative divisions ==
Gorijvari monastery

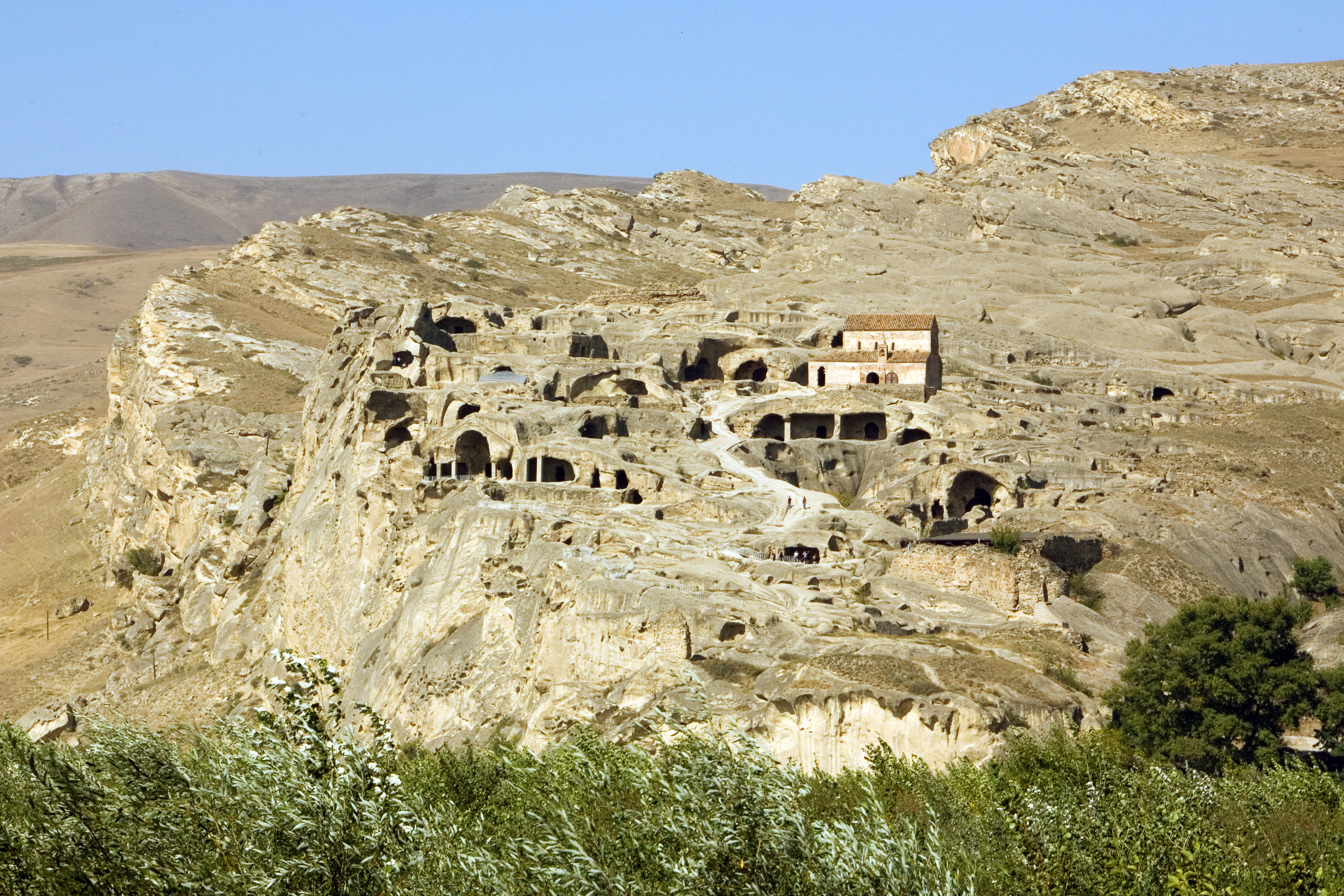
Uplistsikhe

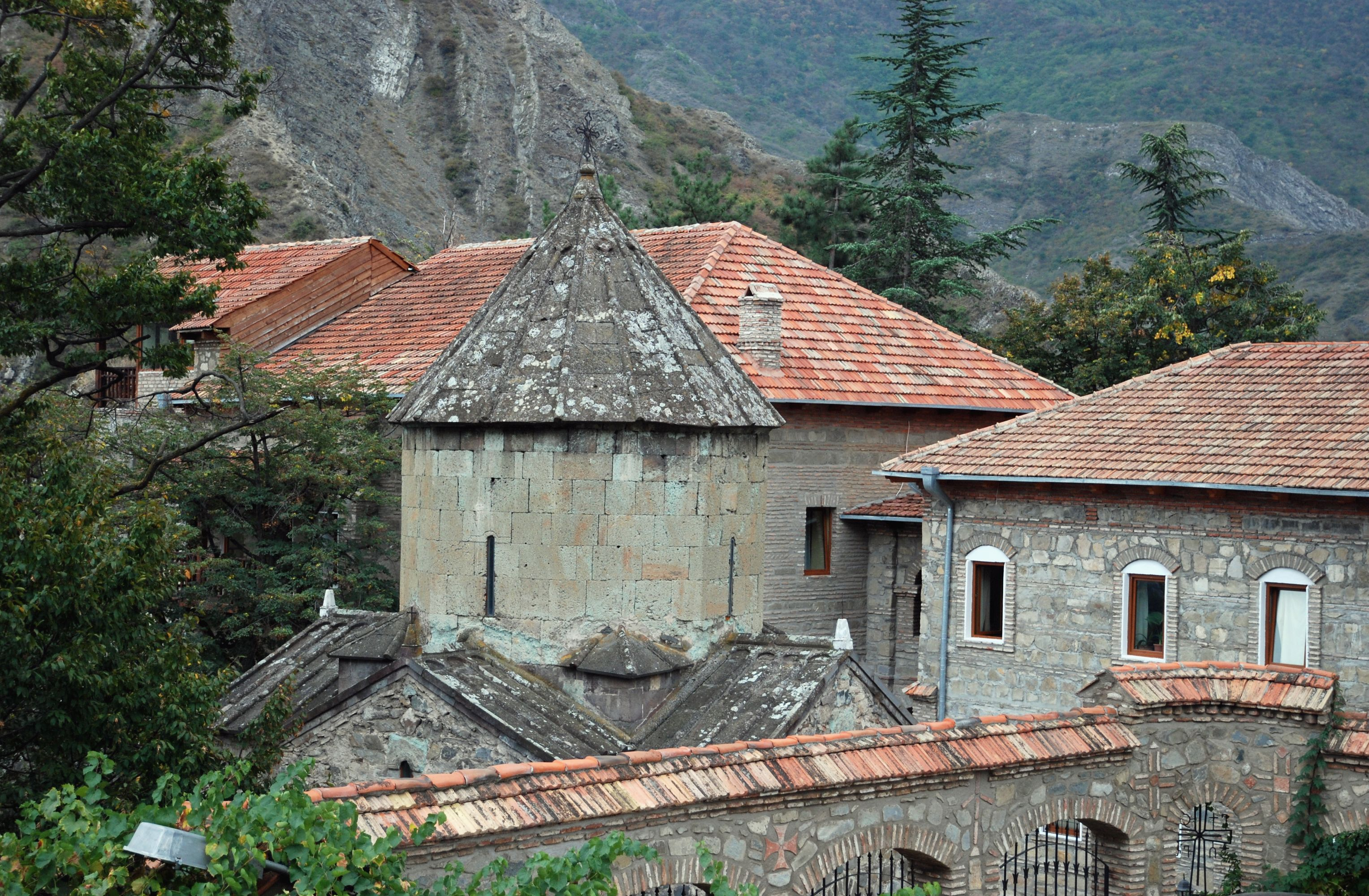
Ateni Sioni Church

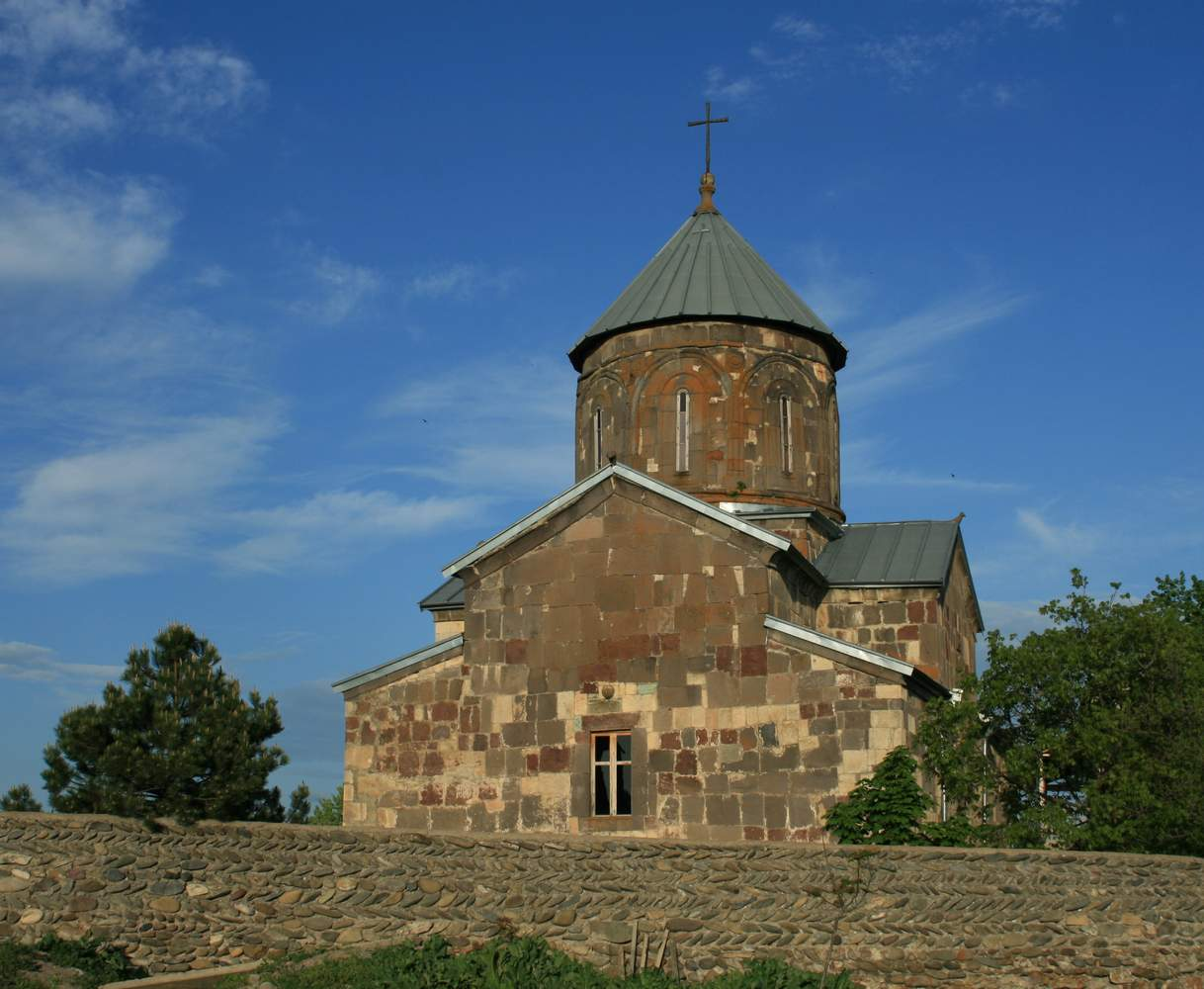
Zemo Nikozi church

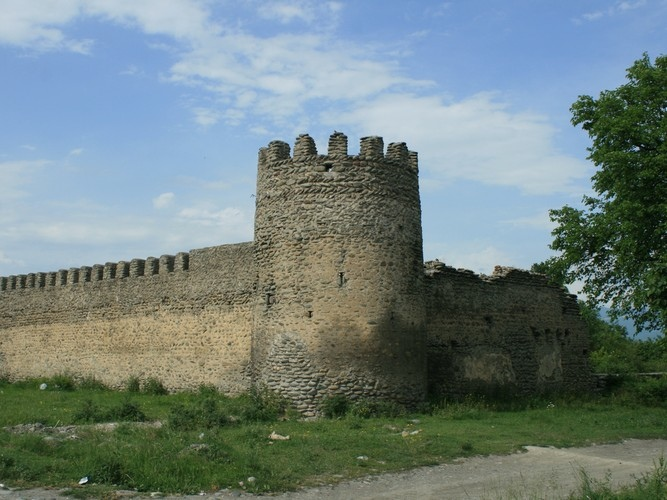
Shindisi Castle

Gori municipality (those parts under de facto Georgian jurisdiction) is divided into 1 city (ქალაქი), 23 communities (თემი), and 115 villages (სოფელი).

=== Cities ===
- Gori
- Tskhinvali

=== Communities ===
- Ateni
- Akhalubani
- Berbuki
- Boshuri
- Dici
- Variani
- Zeghduleti
- Karaleti
- Mereti
- Mejvriskhevi
- Mghebriani
- Nikozi
- Saqavre
- Skra
- Tiniskhidi
- Tirdznisi
- Tqviavi
- Kvakhvreli
- Shavshvebi
- Shindisi
- Dzevera
- Khidistavi

=== Villages ===
- Ateni
- Tsedisi
- Bnavisi
- Olozi
- Ghvarebi
- Akhalubani
- Kveshi
- Akhrisi
- Adzvi
- Mumlaant Kari
- Jariasheni
- Tsitsagiaant Kari
- Kvemo Artsevi
- Berbuki

== See also ==
- List of municipalities in Georgia (country)
