= Vakhtang I =

King of Iberia (440–502)

Vakhtang I Gorgasali
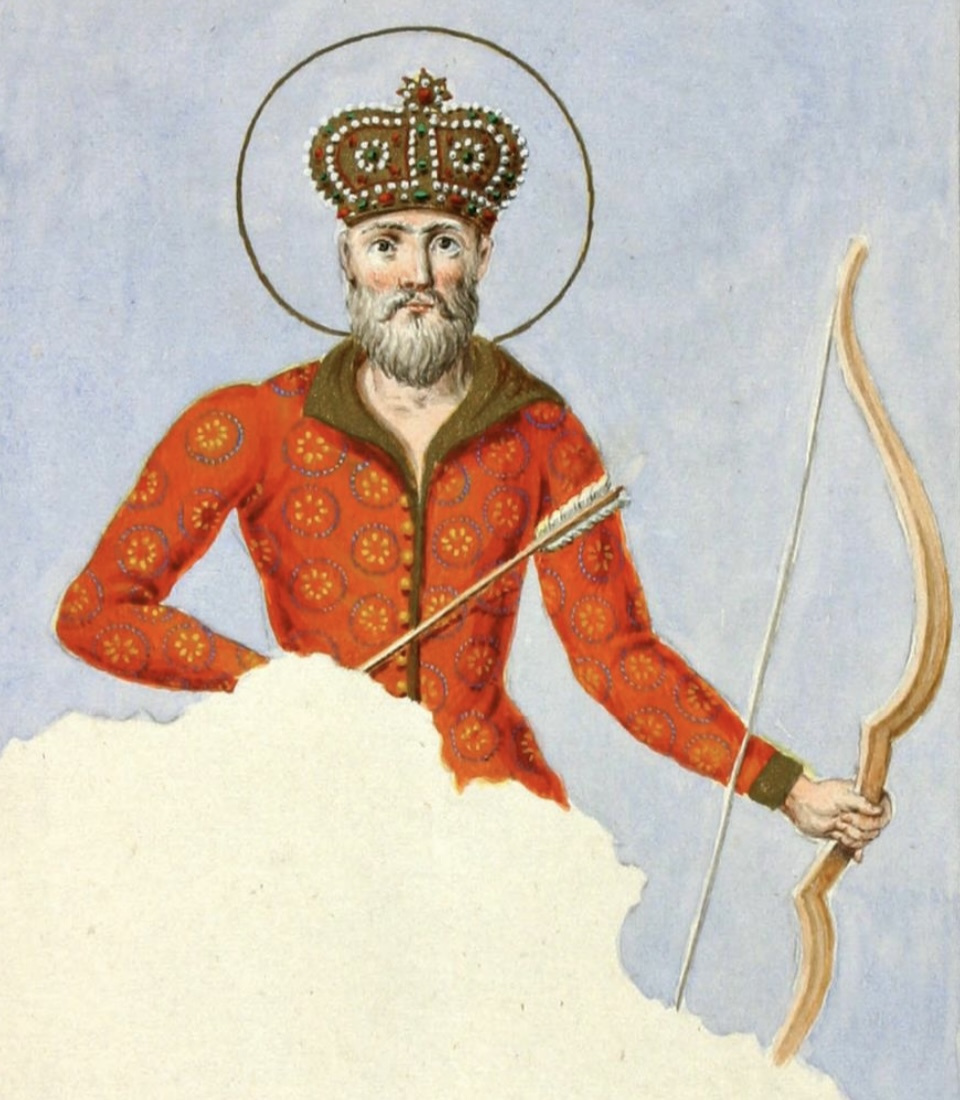
- A miniature by Pier Rossi based on the 17th century fresco of Vakhtang from Svetitskhoveli Cathedral

32nd King of Iberia
- Reign: c. 449 – c. 502, c. 447 – c. 522, or c. 474 – c. 527
- Predecessor: Mihrdat V
- Successor: Dachi
- Born: c. 440, c. 442, or c. 467 (Note: Vakhtang I is estimated to have died at age around 60, which is used to calculate his birth date depending on the date he died); Mtskheta, Kingdom of Iberia, Sasanian Empire
- Died: c. 502, c. 522, or c. 527 (aged c. 60 or c. 82); Ujarma, Kingdom of Iberia, Sasanian Empire
- Burial: Mtskheta, Svetitskhoveli Cathedral
- Spouse: Balendukht; Helena (Elene)
- Issue: Dachi; Leon; Mihrdat; Two anonymous daughters
- Dynasty: Chosroid dynasty
- Father: Mihrdat V
- Mother: Sagdukht
- Religion: Chalcedonian Christianity

Saint Vakhtang
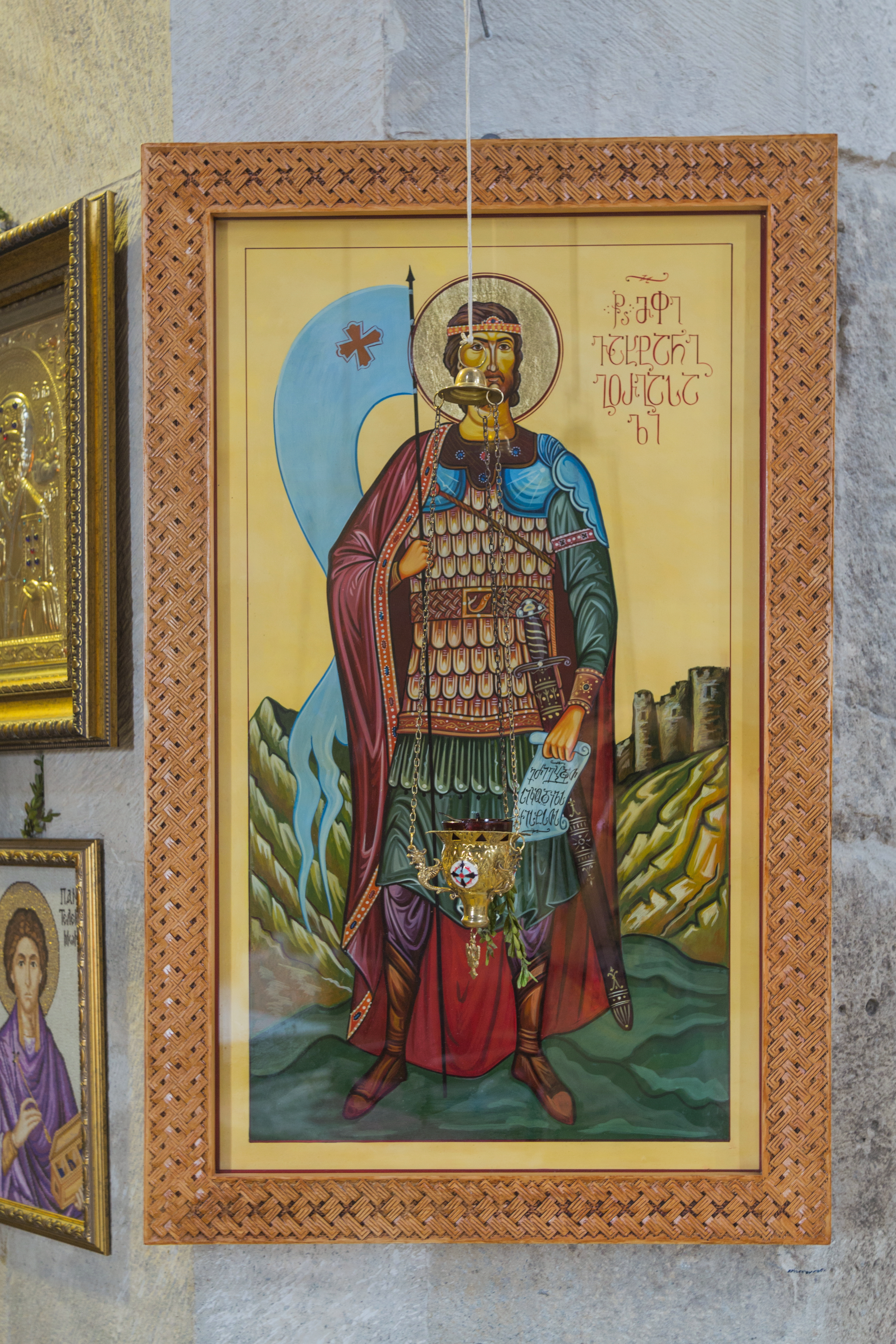
- Icon of Vakhtang

Right-Believing
- Died: c. 502, c. 522, or c. 527
- Venerated in: Eastern Orthodox Church
- Feast: December 13 [O.S. November 30]

Vakhtang I Gorgasali (Georgian: ვახტანგ I გორგასალი, romanized: vakht'ang I gorgasali; c. 439 or 443 – 502 or 522), of the Chosroid dynasty, was a king (mepe) of Iberia, natively known as Kartli (eastern Georgia) in the second half of the 5th and first quarter of the 6th century.

He led his people, through an ill-fated alliance with the Byzantine Empire, into a lengthy struggle against Sasanian Iranian hegemony, which ended in Vakhtang's defeat and weakened the kingdom of Iberia. Tradition also ascribes to him the reorganization of the Georgian Orthodox Church and the foundation of Tbilisi, Georgia's modern capital.

Dating Vakhtang's reign is problematic. Ivane Javakhishvili assigns to Vakhtang's rule the dates c. 449–502 while Cyril Toumanoff suggests the dates c. 447–522, and Manana Sanadze suggests c. 474–527. Furthermore, Toumanoff identifies Vakhtang with the Iberian king Gurgenes known from Procopius' Wars of Justinian.

Vakhtang is a subject of the 8th or 11th century vita attributed to Juansher, which intertwines history and legend into an epic narrative, hyperbolizing Vakhtang's personality and biography. This literary work has been a primary source of Vakhtang's image as an examplary warrior-king and statesman, which has been preserved in popular memory to this day.

By the Middle Ages, he emerged as one of the most popular figures in Georgia's history and has been canonized by the Georgian Orthodox Church as The Holy and Right-Believing King Vakhtang (Georgian: წმინდა დიდმოწამე მეფე ვახტანგი) and is commemorated on December 13 [O.S. November 30].

== Name ==
According to the Life of Vakhtang Gorgasali, the king was given at his birth an Iranian name Varazkhosrovtang, rendered in Georgian as Vakhtang. The name may indeed be derived from Iranian *warx-tang (vahrka-tanū)—"wolf-bodied", a possible reflection of the wolf cult in ancient Georgia. Beginning in the late 13th century, numerous Georgian princes and kings took the name Vakhtang. Toumanoff observes that the name Vakhtang has no Classical equivalent and infers that the king's sobriquet Gorgasal — given to Vakhtang because of the shape of the helmet he wore — was rendered by the 6th-century Roman historian Procopius as Gurgenes (Greek: Γουργένης). Toumanoff's identification of Vakhtang with Gurgenes has not been universally accepted.

== Early reign ==
Monument to Vakhtang I in Sno

Beyond the Life of Vakhtang Gorgasali (hereinafter LVG), the medieval Georgian sources mention Vakhtang only briefly, yet do so with a respect rarely afforded to the pre-Bagratid Georgian monarchs. Notwithstanding its semi-legendary epic character, the LVG provides many important details, which can be combined with the sources closer to the period in question, such as Lazarus of Parpi and Procopius.

Vakhtang is reported by the LVG to have succeeded his father, King Mihrdat V, at the age of 7. His mother, a Christianized Persian Sagdukht, assumed regency in Vakhtang's minority. The author then describes the grave situation in which Iberia was at that time, troubled by the Sassanids' Zoroastrianizing efforts and a ravaging raid by the "Ossetians" from the north, this latter being a possible reference to the invasion by the Huns (which may have included Alans) through the Caspian Gates mentioned by Priscus. At the age of 16, Vakhtang is said to have led a victorious retaliatory war against the "Ossetians", winning a single combat against the enemy's champion (described as being a giant) and relieving his sister Mirandukht from captivity. At the age 19, Vakhtang married Balendukht, "daughter" of the Great King Hormizd (apparently Hormizd III, r. 457–459). Soon, upon the Great King's request, Vakhtang took part in the campaign in "India", probably in Peroz's abortive expedition against the Hephthalites in the 460s, and against the Roman Empire in 472, in which Vakhtang is reported to have gained control of Egrisi (Lazica) and Abkhazia.

== Church affairs ==
Returning to Iberia, Vakhtang took up a series of measures aimed at strengthening the royal authority. Resenting Persia's encroachments on his independence, Vakhtang reversed his political orientation and effected a rapprochement with the Roman government. He married Helena (Elene), "daughter" (possibly relative) of Emperor Zeno, and received permission from Constantinople to elevate the head of the church of Iberia, the bishop of Mtskheta, to the rank of catholicos, whom he sent, together with twelve newly appointed bishops, to be consecrated at Antioch. These rearrangements did not pass smoothly and the king had to overcome opposition, especially in the person of Mikel, the deposed bishop of Mtskheta. Javakhishvili explains this conflict on account of doctrinal differences between the Monophysite Vakhtang and Diophysite Mikel, a presumption supported by Toumanoff, who points out that the change of prelate and his subordination to Antioch could "only imply acceptance of Zeno's formulary of faith", i.e., the moderately Monophysite Henotikon of 482. On his part, another Georgian historian, Simon Janashia, argues that Vakhtang was inclined towards Diophysitism while Mikel adhered to Monophysitism.

== War with Persia ==
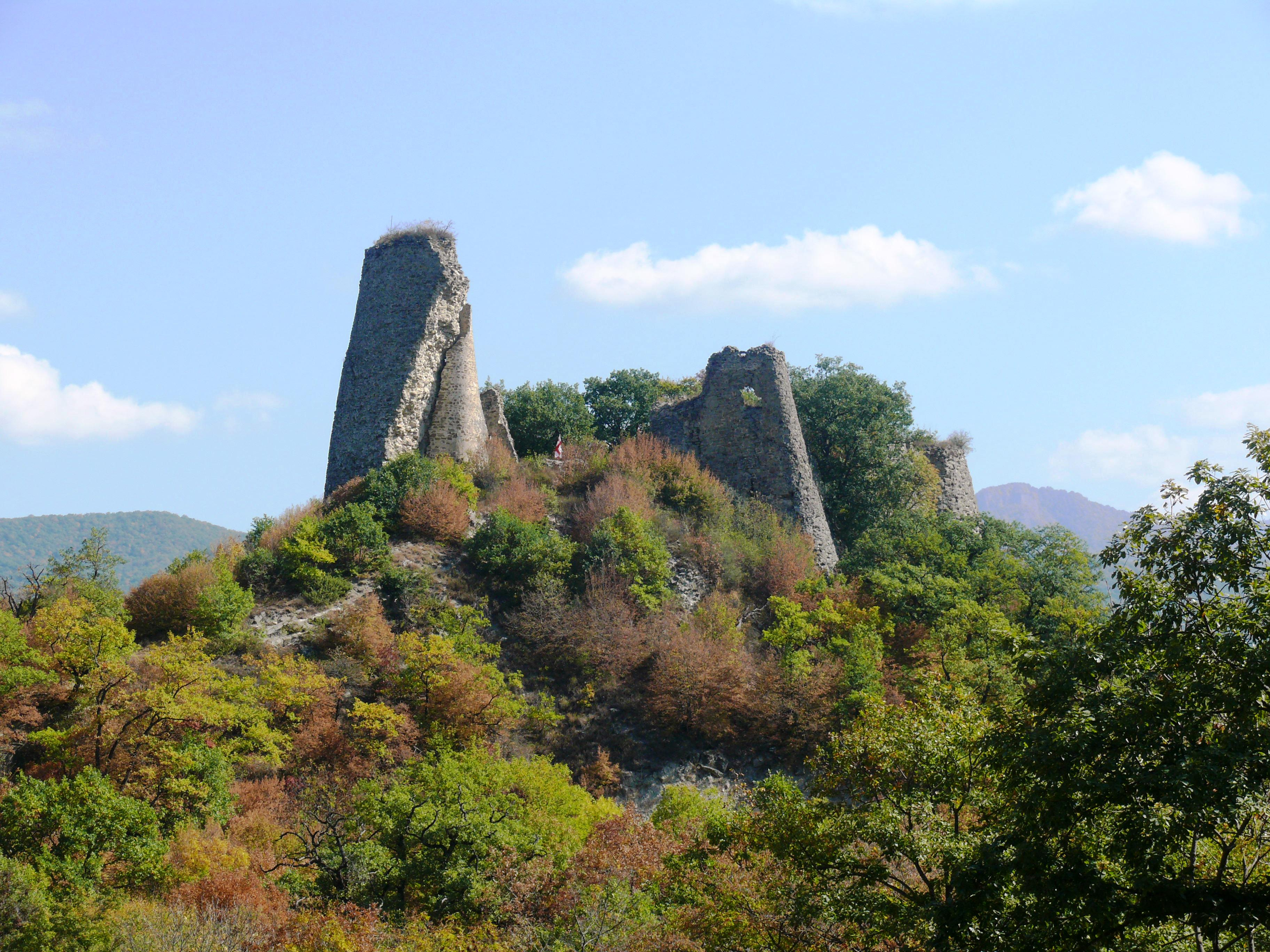
Ruins of Ujarma, once an Iberian stronghold under Vakhtang

By espousing a pro-Roman policy, Vakhtang further alienated his nobles, who sought Iranian support against the king's encroachments on their autonomy. In 482, Vakhtang put to death his most influential vassal, Varsken, vitaxa of Gogarene, a convert to Zoroastrianism and a champion of Iran's influence in the Caucasus, who had executed his Christian wife, Shushanik, daughter of the Mamikonid prince Vardan II and the heroine of the earliest surviving piece of Georgian literature. By this act, Vakhtang placed himself in open confrontation with his Iranian suzerain. Vakhtang called on the Armenian princes and the Huns for co-operation. After some hesitation, the Armenians, under Vardan's nephew Vahan Mamikonian, joined forces with Vakhtang. The allies were routed and Iberia was ravaged by Iranian punitive expeditions in 483 and 484, forcing Vakhtang into flight to Roman-controlled Lazica (modern-day western Georgia). After Peroz's death in the war with the Hephthalites in 484, his successor Balash reestablished peace in the Caucasus. Vakhtang was able to resume his reign in Iberia, but did not betray his pro-Roman line.

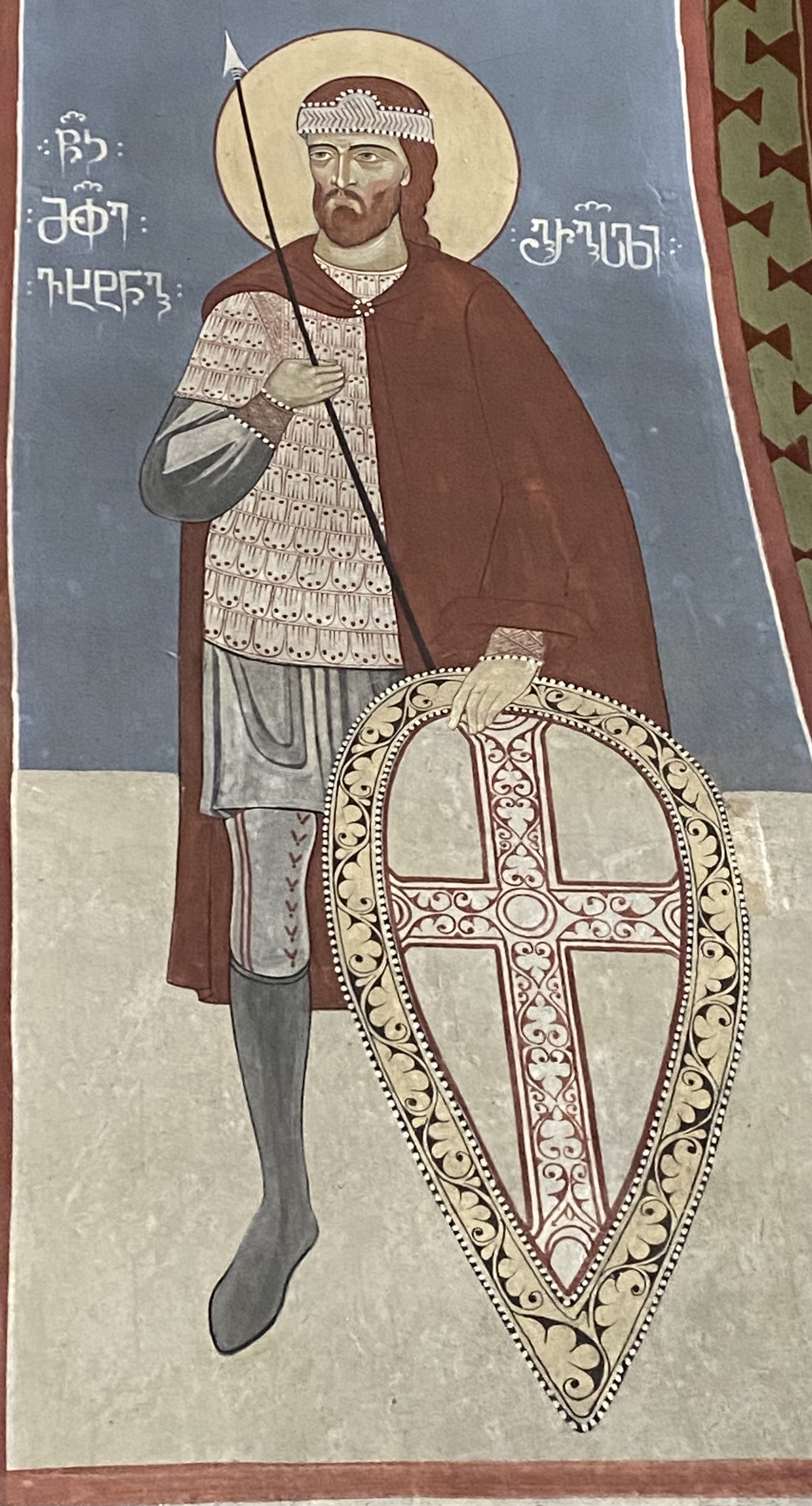
A mural painting of King Vakhtang I of Iberia at the Church of the Holy Virgin of Iveria in Tbilisi

Once the Hundred Years Peace between Iran and Rome collapsed, the Sassanid monarch Kavadh I summoned Vakhtang as a vassal to join his new campaign against Rome. Vakhtang refused, provoking an Iranian invasion of his kingdom. Then about 60, he had to spend the last years of his life in war and exile, fruitlessly appealing for Roman aid. The chronology of this period is blurry, but by 518 an Iranian viceroy had been installed at the Iberian town of Tiflis, founded—according to Georgian tradition—by none other than Vakhtang and designated as the country's future capital. According to the LVG, Vakhtang died fighting an Iranian invading army at the hands of his renegade slave who shot him through a defect of his armor, in the armpit. The wounded king was transported to his castle at Ujarma where he died and was interred at the cathedral in Mtskheta. Javakhishvili puts Vakhtang's death at c. 502, though according to Sanadze he is more likely to have died during the Iberian War in c. 527. If Toumanoff's identification of Procopius’ Gurgenes with Vakhtang is true, the king might have ended his reign in 522 by taking refuge in Lazica, where he possibly died around the same time. Gurgenes’ family members—Peranius, Pacurius, and Phazas—had careers in the Roman military.

== Family ==
According to the LVG, Vakhtang was survived by three sons. Dachi, Vakhtang's eldest son by his first marriage to the Iranian princess Balendukht (who died at childbirth), succeeded him as king of Iberia and had to return to Iranian allegiance. Two younger sons by Vakhtang's second marriage to the Roman lady Helena (Elene)—Leon and Mihrdat—were enfeoffed of the southwestern Iberian provinces of Klarjeti and Javakheti in which Leon's progeny—the Guaramids—traditionally followed a pro-Roman orientation. Both these lines survived in Iberia into the 8th century, being succeeded by their energetic cousins of the Bagratid family. Toumanoff has inferred that the Samanazus, a name of the Iberian "king" found in John Malala's list of rulers contemporary with Justinian and reported by Theophanes the Confessor and Georgios Kedrenos to have visited Constantinople in 535, might have been a corruption of words meaning "brother of Dachi" and so perhaps refers to Mihrdat.

== Will of Vakhtang ==
Before his death, the wounded King Vakhtang left the following will to his son Dachi and to the Georgians:

მე ესე რა წარვალ წინაშე ღმრთისა ჩემისა, და ვმადლობ სახელსა მისსა, რამეთუ არა დამაკლო [or: დამარხო] გამორჩეულთა წმიდათა მისთა. აწ გამცნებ თქუენ, რათა მტკიცედ სარწმუნოებასა ზედა სდგეთ და ეძიებდეთ ქრისტესთჳს სიკუდილსა სახელსა მისსა ზედა, რათა წარუვალი დიდება მოიგოთ.
And I, as I go to my God, I give thanks to His name, because he did not sacrifice [or: 'spare'] his chosen blessings. Now I exhort you, that you stand firm in your faith and seek death for Christ in His name, so that you may obtain imperishable glory!

He also called on Georgians not to abandon ties with the Byzantine Empire:

მე ჴორციელებრითა დიდებითა გადიდენ თქუენ ნათესავთა ჩემთა. და სახლსა ჩუენსა ნუ შეურაცხჰყოფთ, და სიყუარულსა ბერძენთასა ნუ დაუტეობთ.
I have magnified you and all my generations in the flesh with glory; neither disgrace our home nor abandon the love of the Greeks.

== Legacy ==
Vakhtang entered a pantheon of Georgian historical heroes already in the Middle Ages. In popular memory, his image has acquired a legendary and romantic façade. Vakhtang is a subject of several folk poems and legends, extolling the king's perceived greatness, enormous physical strength, courage and devoutness to Christianity.

Vakhtang has been credited with the foundation of several towns, castles, and monasteries across Georgia, including the nation's capital Tbilisi, where a street and a square bear his name, and a 1967 monument by the sculptor Elguja Amashukeli tops the Metekhi cliff. A legend has it that when King Vakhtang was in the forest, his falcon chased a pheasant. The bird fell into a hot water spring and the king and his servants saw the steam come out of the water. Surprised by the abundance of hot water, Vakhtang gave orders to build a city on this site and named it "Tbilisi", that is, "the site of warm springs".

Vakhtang was officially included in the Georgian Orthodox calendar — and a church built in his honor in the city of Rustavi—early in the 1990s, but he had presumably been considered a saint long before that.

The Vakhtang Gorgasali Order, created in 1992, is one of the highest military decorations in Georgia.

== Notes ==
Preceded by Mithridates V	King of Iberia; 447–522	Succeeded by Dachi
