= Juansher Juansheriani =

8th or 11th-century Georgian historian

Juansher Juansheriani (Georgian: ჯუანშერ ჯუანშერიანი; fl. c. 790–800 or 11th century) was a Georgian prince (eristavi) and historian, related to the royal Chosroid dynasty of Iberia (ancient Georgia), whose appanage consisted of the lands in Inner Iberia and in Kakheti.

Juansher was a husband of a niece of Archil of Kakheti, to whom a note in the text of the Queen Anne and Queen Mary codices of the Georgian Chronicles attributes the work "The Life of King Vakhtang Gorgasali" which covers the history of Iberia from the reign of Vakhtang I (c. 447–502/522) down to the period of Archil (c. 736–786). This attribution remains problematic, however, and some modern scholars have suggested, though controversially, that the bulk of this work was, in fact, authored by the 11th-century chronicler Leonti Mroveli, while the author of its untitled continuation, also ascribed to Juansher, is conventionally referred to as Pseudo-Juansher.
