= Bacurius =

Bacurius (Georgian: ბაკურ, romanized: bak'ur) is a Latinized version of the Iranian-derived Georgian male given name Pacorus.

It may refer to:

- Bacurius I, King of Iberia (reigned 234–249)
- Bacurius II, King of Iberia (reigned 534–547)
- Bacurius III (died 580), King of Iberia
- Bacurius the Iberian (died 394), Georgian commander in the Roman army

== See also ==
- Pacurius the Iberian, 6th-century Chosroid prince and Georgian commander in the Roman army
