= History of Georgia–Iran relations =

Iran and Georgia have had relations for thousands of years. Eastern and Southern Georgia had been under intermittent Persian suzerainty for many centuries up to the early course of the 19th century, while western Georgia had been under its suzerainty for much shorter periods of time throughout history. Georgia especially rose to importance from the time of the Persian Safavids.

Due to these millennia long intertwined relations, there has been a lot of political and cultural exchange between the two nations for thousands of years. In the words of Keith Hitchins / Encyclopædia Iranica:

Between the Achaemenid era and the beginning of the 19th century, Persia played a significant and at times decisive role in the history of the Georgian people. The Persian presence helped to shape political institutions, modify social structure and land holding, and enrich literature and culture. Persians also acted as a counterweight to other powerful forces in the region, notably the Romans (and Byzantines), the Ottoman Turks, and the Russians. But the Persian-Georgian relationship was by no means one-sided, for the Georgians contributed substantially to Persia's military and administrative successes and even affected its social structure, especially under the Safavids.

== Ancient period ==
Evidence from Achaemenid cuneiform inscriptions suggest that there was trade between the Achaemenids and Georgian tribes. According to Herodotus, the proto-Georgians of Transcaucasia were included in the 18th and 19th satrapies (see: Districts of the Achaemenid Empire). Although the Achaemenids had Southern Georgia under their control, they never managed to subdue the tribes to the north. Following the collapse of the Achaemenids, the first Iberian king, Parnavaz (whose mother was a Persian woman), adopted a Persian style institutions as models in organizing his realm.

During the Parthian era, the Caucasus was contested between Rome and Persia, with the monarchy of Georgia playing both sides in order to maintain its independence. In the late 2nd century AD, the Arsacid Parthians established an eponymous branch of their dynasty on the Georgian throne, known as the Arsacid dynasty of Iberia. From the first centuries C.E., the cult of Mithras and Zoroastrianism were commonly practiced in Colchis and Iberia. Excavation of rich burials in Bori, Armazi, and Zguderi has produced silver drinking cups with the impression of a horse either standing at a fire-altar or with its right foreleg raised above the altar. The cult of Mithras, distinguished by its syncretic character and thus complementary to local cults, especially the cult of the Sun, gradually came to merge with ancient Georgian beliefs. It is even thought that Mithras must have been the precursor of St. George in pagan Georgia. Step by step, Iranian beliefs and ways of life penetrated deeply the practices of the Iberian court and elite: the Armazian script and “language,” which is based on Aramaic (see Tsereteli), was adopted officially (a number of inscriptions in Aramaic of the Classical/Hellenistic periods are known from Colchis as well,; the court was organized on Iranian models, the elite dress was influenced by Iranian costume, the Iberian elite adopted Iranian personal names, and the official cult of Armazi (q.v.) was introduced by King Pharnavaz in the 3rd century B.C.E. (connected by the medieval Georgian chronicle to Zoroastrianism) This ended when the Sassanids took power. There was peace between Iberia and the Sassanids and Iberia helped the Sassanids in their campaigns against Rome. During this time, Zoroastrianism was also established in the region. However, Rome managed to conquer the territory for sixty years, at which point Christianity was established around 317 AD. Iranian elements in ancient Georgian art and archeology gradually started to disappear after the adoption of Christianity in the same century.

Decisive for the future history of Iberia was the foundation of the Sasanian (or Sassanid) Empire in 224. By replacing the weak Parthian realm with a strong, centralized state, it changed the political orientation of Iberia away from Rome. Iberia became a tributary of the Sasanian state during the reign of Shapur I (241-272). Relations between the two countries seem to have been friendly at first, as Iberia cooperated in Persian campaigns against Rome, and the Iberian king Amazasp III (260-265) was listed as a high dignitary of the Sasanian realm, not a vassal who had been subdued by force of arms. But the aggressive tendencies of the Sasanians were evident in their propagation of Zoroastrianism, which was probably established in Iberia between the 260s and 290s.

However, in the Peace of Nisibis (298) while the Roman Empire obtained control of Caucasian Iberia again as a vassal state and acknowledged the reign over all the Caucasian area, it recognized Mirian III, the first of the Chosroid dynasty, as king of Iberia.

However, after the emperor Julian was slain during his failed campaign in Persia in 363, Rome ceded control of Iberia to Persia, and King Varaz-Bakur I (Asphagur) (363-365) became a Persian vassal, an outcome confirmed by the Peace of Acilisene in 387 However, a later ruler of Kartli, Pharsman IV (406-409), preserved his country's autonomy and ceased to pay tribute to Persia. Persia prevailed, and Sassanian kings began to appoint a viceroy (pitiaxae/bidaxae) to keep watch on their vassal. They eventually made the office hereditary in the ruling house of Lower Kartli, thus inaugurating the Kartli pitiaxate, which brought an extensive territory under its control. Although it remained a part of the kingdom of Kartli, its viceroys turned their domain into a center of Persian influence. Sasanian rulers put the Christianity of the Georgians to a severe test. They promoted the teachings of Zoroaster, and by the middle of the 5th century Zoroastrianism had become the second official religion in eastern Georgia alongside Christianity.

Religious issues arose after the Sassanids retook the territory. In 580, the Sassanids abolished the monarchy and made Iberia a province. Fighting between Rome, and later the Byzantines, and the Sassanids continued over the territory until the collapse of the Sassanids during the Islamic conquest of Persia, with Eastern Georgia nevertheless staying under Persian suzerainty.

== Middle Ages ==
Around the year 1160, Tamar the Great was born to George III, and Burdukhan of Alania; an Iranian speaking nation. The Kingdom of Georgia, under the reign of Tamar the Great, in 1209, laid waste to Ardabil – according to the Georgian and Armenian annals – as a revenge for the local Muslim ruler's attack on Ani and his massacre of the city's Christian population. In a great final burst, the brothers led an army marshaled throughout Tamar's possessions and vassal territories in a march, through Nakhchivan and Julfa, to Marand, Tabriz, and Qazvin in northwest Iran, pillaging several settlements on their way, making northwestern Iran mark the southernmost maximum extent of the empire.

== Safavid period ==
=== 16th century ===
Rostom (also known as Rustam Khan), viceroy of Kartli, eastern Georgia, from 1633 to 1658.

The Iranian Safavid dynasty (which, due to extensive intermarriages, was of partly ethnic Georgian origin itself as well, see; Safavid dynasty family tree) was in constant conflict with the Ottomans over control and influence in the Caucasus. From the 16th to the 18th centuries, Iran had to deal with several independent kingdoms and principalities, as Georgia was not a single state at the time. These entities often following divergent political courses. Iran's sphere of influence was Eastern Georgia (the kingdoms of Kartli and Kakheti) and Southern Georgia (the kingdoms of Samtskhe-Saatabago), while Western Georgia was under Ottoman influence. These independent kingdoms came under intermittent suzerainty of Persia after Div-Sultan Rumlu's conquests in 1518 (though Kartli and Kakheti had been made vassals as early as 1503), till the early 19th century.

The Georgian kings and princes, however, sought to break loose of their vassalage. David, the king of Kartli refused to adopt Islam, did not present himself at Shah Ismail's court, and made preparations for war. In 1521, Shah Ismail sent out a large army to suppress the rebellion. The army invaded and captured the Georgian capital of Tbilisi. After Ismail's death, the ten-year-old Tahmasp became Shah. Taking advantage of the situation, David retook Tbilisi and freed himself from vassalage. The situation did not end there, as later Georgian kings continued the fight against Safavid Iran, while many others chose the Iranian side. In 1527, Luarsab I ascended came to power in Kartli. Iskandar Beg Munshi, an Iranian historian of the first half of the 17th century, noted that Luarsab was distinguished among Georgian kings for his courage, refusing to show obedience and pay tribute. Only Luarsab continued to fight against the Iranians as other Georgian kings had made deals and accepted Iranian sovereignty, often accepting Islam and taking Persian names and embracing Persian culture for many centuries afterwards. In 1540-1554 Shah Tahmasp led four campaigns against Georgia, devastating the country's eastern and southern regions and taking tens of thousands of Georgian captives to Iran. Luarsab fell in battle in 1556.

On May 29, 1555, Safavid Iran and the Ottoman Empire concluded a treaty at Amasya by which Transcaucasia was divided between the two. Western Georgia and the western part of southern Georgia fell to The Ottomans, while Eastern Georgia and the (largest) eastern part of southern Georgia fell to Iran, thus making Kartli again part of the Safavid Empire.

In 1556 Luarsab's son, Simon (also called Somayun Khan by Iskandar Beg Munshi), ascended the thrown of Kartli and continued the struggle for independence. In 1569 Simon was taken prisoner and sent to Qazvin. Refusing to adopt Islam, he was imprisoned in the fortress of Alamut in Iran. During Simon's captivity Kartli was governed by his Islamised brother Daud-Khan, adopted son of the shah of Iran. Shah Ismail II later freed Simon, making him an ally against the Ottomans. After this period, Iranian Georgians gained increasing influence and power in politics and the military.

=== 17th century ===
In 1603, Shah Abbas attempted to solve the Georgian question by conquering eastern Georgia. Some members of the Georgian monarchy continued their struggle and Shah Abbas invaded and devastated Georgia several times, often killing members of the royal family. Upon the ignoring of Abbas' demand for Teimuraz I and Luarsab II to appear in Mazandaran and his suspicion of their treason, he used it as a pretext to invade his Georgian lands, and settle the issue once and for all. During these punitive campaigns against his formerly two loyal subjects, 200,000 Georgians were deported to mainland Iran (see Abbas I's Kakhetian and Kartlian campaigns). After continued fighting and resistance, both sides agreed to compromise. The monarchies of the Georgian kingdoms were replaced by pro-Iranian monarchs of the Bagrationi line, while those who resisted would be eventually executed in Iran, such as the same Luarsab II of Kartli. But the kingdoms would be controlled as subjects for many centuries afterwards. In 1660 a rebellion took place in which the Georgians attacked the Turkmen settled in their regions by the Iranian Safavids, and defeated the Iranian garrisons. Afterwards, after the rebellion was suppressed, the leaders of the rebellion turned themselves in and were executed, in order to prevent Safavid retaliation.

=== 18th century ===
Early in the 18th century, Iran was under a serious threat of being conquered by the Afghans. The shah of Iran entrusted the command of the troops fighting against Afghanistan to the Islamized Georgian kings. There were about 2000 Georgian troops in Afghanistan. Led by George XI (known as Gurgin Khan in Iran), the Georgians succeeded temporarily in halting the raids of Afghan tribes against Iran. In 1709 George XI was treacherously murdered by instigation of Afghan leader Mirwais Khan Hotak.

From the 18th century the religious factor did not seem to determine state relations, yet the Shah's court ascribed serious meaning to the valee of Kartli professing Islam. By such policy towards Eastern Georgia, Iran clearly confronted Russian and Ottoman operations in the country. To keep Eastern Georgia loyal and its king a Muslim, the shah made many concessions to the valee of “Gurjistan” – adding to his titles, raising his “salary”, and granting him villages in Iran.

In 1703, Vakhtang VI became the ruler of the kingdom of Kartli. In 1716, he adopted Islam and the shah confirmed him as King of Kartli. However, the shah retained Vakhtang in Iran, appointing him as spasalar (“commander”) of the Iranian region of Azerbaijan. Vakhtang VI carried out successful campaigns against the Dagestani people. However, at a decisive moment he was ordered to discontinue the campaign, leading Vakhtang to adopt a pro-Russian orientation, though the Russian failed to tender him the promised military aid. During the war with the Afghans, the Ottomans occupied Kartli. In July of the same year Vakhtang was forced to go into exile to Russia, with a 1200 strong retinue.

The Safavid dynasty collapsed in 1736, being succeeded by the Afsharids who would control all of Georgia again. Nader Shah expelled the Turkish garrisons that had invaded Georgia in the wake of the collapse of the Safavids and swiftly re-established Iranian rule over Georgia. For the loyal service of Teimuraz II and his son Heraclius II against the Ottomans and their help in reestablishing Iranian rule over Georgia, he appointed them respectively as kings of Kartli and Kakheti in 1744. The Iranian Afsharids were succeeded by the Qajars, who would also reestablish (though briefly) Iranian suzerainty over Georgia.

== Qajar period ==
Eastern Georgia, composed of the kingdoms of Kartli and Kakheti, had been in the early modern era under Iranian vassalship for the first time in 1502, and had been under intermittent Iranian suzerainty and rule since 1555. However, with the death of Nader Shah in 1747, both kingdoms broke free of Iranian control and were reunited in a personal union under the rule of the energetic king Heraclius II (Erekle) in 1762. Between 1747 and 1795, Erekle was therefore, by the turn of events in Iran following the ongoing turmoil there, able to maintain Georgia's autonomy through the Zand period. In 1783, Heraclius placed his kingdom under the protection of the Russian Empire in the Treaty of Georgievsk. In the last few decades of the 18th century, Georgia had become a more important element in Russo-Iranian relations than some provinces in northern mainland Persia, such as Mazandaran or even Gilan. Unlike Peter I, Catherine, the then ruling monarch of Russia, viewed Georgia as a pivot for her Caucasian policy, as Russia's new aspirations were to use it as a base of operations against both Iran and the Ottoman Empire, both immediate bordering geo-political rivals of Russia. On top of that, having another port on the Georgian coast of the Black Sea would be ideal. A limited Russian contingent of two infantry battalions with four artillery pieces arrived in Tbilisi in 1784, but was withdrawn, despite the frantic protests of the Georgians, in 1787 as a new war against Ottoman Turkey had started on a different front.

The consequences of these events came a few years later, when a new dynasty, the Qajars, emerged victorious in the protracted power struggle in Persia. Their head, Agha Mohammad Khan, as his first objective, resolved to bring the Caucasus again fully under the Persian orbit. For Agha Mohammah Khan, the resubjugation and reintegration of Georgia into the Iranian Empire was part of the same process that had brought Shiraz, Isfahan, and Tabriz under his rule. He viewed, like the Safavids and Nader Shah before him, the territories no different than the territories in mainland Iran. Georgia was a province of Iran the same way Khorasan was. As the Cambridge History of Iran states, its permanent secession was inconceivable and had to be resisted in the same way as one would resist an attempt at the separation of Fars or Gilan. It was therefore natural for Agha Mohammad Khan to perform whatever necessary means in the Caucasus in order to subdue and reincorporate the recently lost regions following Nader Shah's death and the demise of the Zands, including putting down what in Iranian eyes was seen as treason on the part of the wali of Georgia. Finding an interval of peace amid their own quarrels and with northern, western, and central Persia secure, the Persians demanded Heraclius II to renounce the treaty with Russia and to reaccept Persian suzerainty, in return for peace and the security of his kingdom. The Ottomans, Iran's neighboring rival, recognized the latter's rights over Kartli and Kakheti for the first time in four centuries. Heraclius appealed then to his theoretical protector, Empress Catherine II of Russia, pledging for at least 3,000 Russian troops, but he was not listened, leaving Georgia to fend off the Persian threat alone. Nevertheless, Heraclius II still rejected the Khan's ultimatum.

Agha Mohammad Khan subsequently crossed the Aras River, and after a turn of events by which he gathered more support from his subordinate khans of Erivan and Ganja, he sent Erekle a last ultimatum, which he also declined, but, sent couriers to St.Petersburg. Gudovich, who sat in Georgievsk at the time, instructed Erekle to avoid "expense and fuss", while Erekle, together with Solomon II and some Imeretians headed southwards of Tbilisi to fend off the Iranians.

With half of the troops Agha Mohammad Khan crossed the Aras river with, he now marched directly upon Tbilisi, where it commenced into a huge battle between the Iranian and Georgian armies. Erekle had managed to mobilize some 5,000 troops, including some 2,000 from neighboring Imereti under its King Solomon II. The Georgians, hopelessly outnumbered, were eventually defeated despite stiff resistance. Iranian king Agha Mohammad Khan was eventually in full control of the Georgian capital. The Persian army marched back laden with spoil and carrying off thousands of captives.

By this, after the conquest of Tbilisi and being in effective control of eastern Georgia, Agha Mohammad was formally crowned Shah in 1796 in the Mughan plain. As the Cambridge History of Iran notes; "Russia's client, Georgia, had been punished, and Russia's prestige, damaged." Heraclius II returned to Tbilisi to rebuild the city, but the destruction of his capital was a death blow to his hopes and projects. Upon learning of the fall of Tbilisi General Gudovich put the blame on the Georgians themselves. To restore Russian prestige, Catherine II declared war on Persia, upon the proposal of Gudovich, and sent an army under Valerian Zubov to the Qajar possessions on April of that year, but the new Tsar Paul I, who succeeded Catherine in November, shortly recalled it.

=== Russo-Persian Wars and irrevocable cessions ===
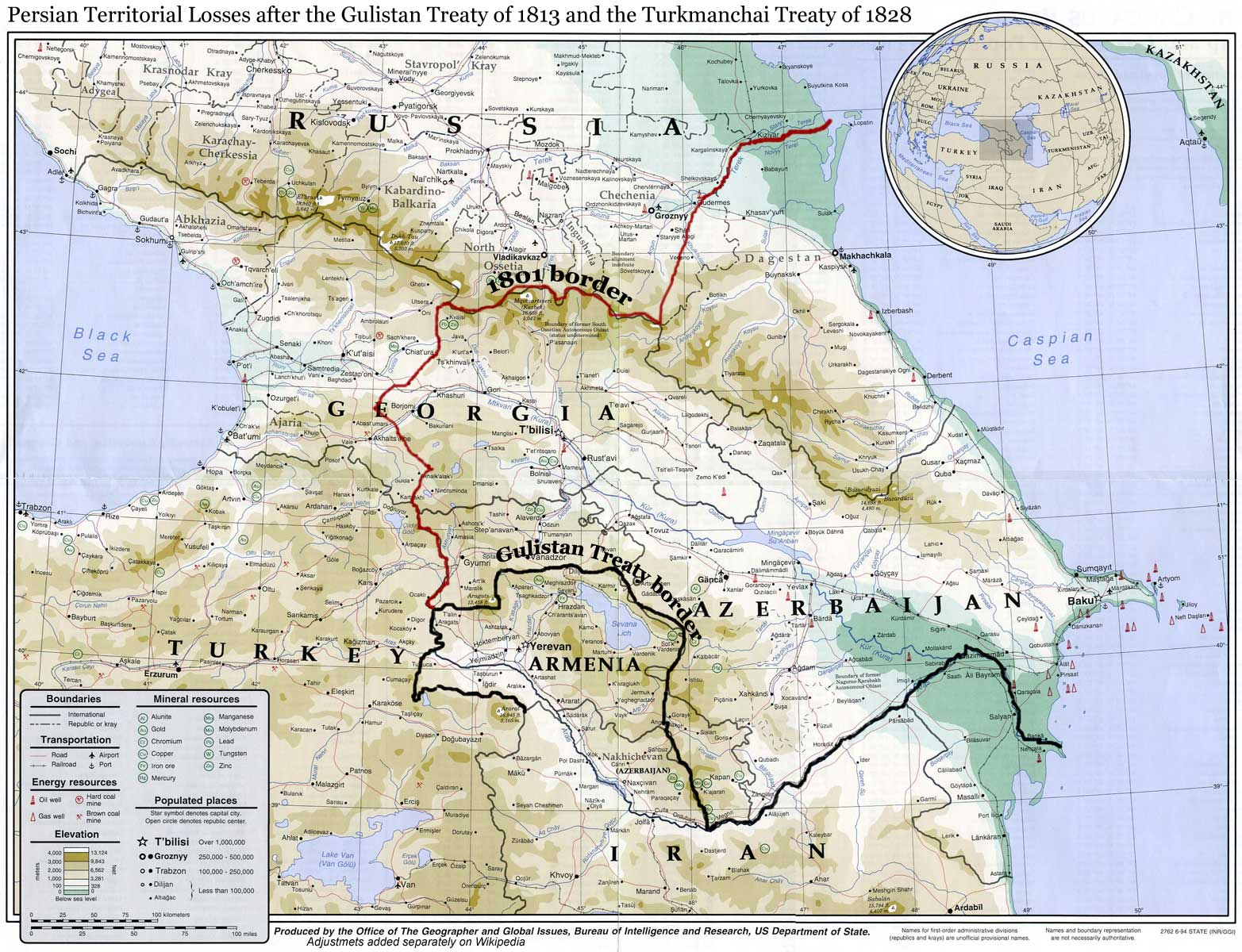
Map showing Irans's northwestern borders in the 19th century, comprising nowadays Eastern Georgia, Dagestan, Armenia, and Azerbaijan, prior to being ceded to Imperial Russia per the two Russo-Persian Wars of the 19th century.

In 1797, Agha Mohammad Khan was assassinated in Shusha, after which the Iranian grip over Georgia softened. A year later, Erekle II had died as well, leaving the country in total muddle and confusion. A year later, the Russian troops took advantage of the situation and marched into Tbilisi. This, and the official annexation of Georgia in 1801, would form the direct reason for the two Russo-Persian Wars of the 19th century. The first war, the Russo-Persian War (1804-1813) directly started over the consolidation of Iran-Russian rule over Georgia. The Iranian shah, like all kings before him, viewed Georgia as an unmistakable and integral part of the Iranian domains, no different than the mainland provinces of Gilan or Fars for example. Eastern Georgia furthermore had been under intermittent Iranian rule 1555. The annexation of Georgia was thus annexation of Iranian land, which made it inevitable that the new Iranian shah, Fath Ali Shah Qajar, would fight the two 19th-century wars with Russia to keep its Iranian domains safe. The very first war, however, the 1804-1813 war, turned out in a huge failure. Despite Iranian successes in the earlier stages of the war, the successful late Russian campaigns, notably those at Aslanduz and Lankaran, made Iran forcefully sue for peace. The Treaty of Gulistan that was concluded in 1813, forced Qajar Iran to irrevocably cede Georgia, as well as Dagestan and most of modern-day Azerbaijan to Imperial Russia, amongst the other terms of the treaty.

The next bout of hostilities, due to the huge dissatisfaction with the turn of events that forced Iran to cede swaths of its lands, culminated in the Russo-Persian War (1826-1828). Despite a successful Iranian offensive in the first year, it eventually turned out in an even worse defeat; the 1828 Treaty of Turkmenchay forced Iran to irrevocably cede all of modern-day Armenia and the remaining part of the Azerbaijani Republic that were still in Iranian hands. By 1828, Iran was stripped of all its territories in Transcaucasia and the North Caucasus including Georgia, which all had made part of the concept of Iran for three centuries.

As the millennia-old links with Iran and the Caucasus could only be severed by a superior force from outside, it would be Russia that cut these ties. From 1813 and on, Georgia entered a Russian-dominated sphere until 1991 with the dissolution of the Soviet Union.

== Cultural exchanges ==
Starting from the early 16th century, although certain aspects of more recent times were already incorporated since the 12th century, until the course of the 19th century, Georgian culture became significantly influenced by Persian culture. Though notably more visibly amongst the higher classes, Persian cultural aspects were incorporated amongst the already existing Georgian columns, especially painting, architecture, and literature. The French traveller Jean Chardin who visited Georgia in 1672 noted that the Georgians followed Persian customs. Since many Georgian kings, princes, and nobles were either born or raised in mainland Iran, it is not surprising that Persian cultural aspects spread in Georgia.

=== Georgian literary contacts with Persia and Persian literature ===
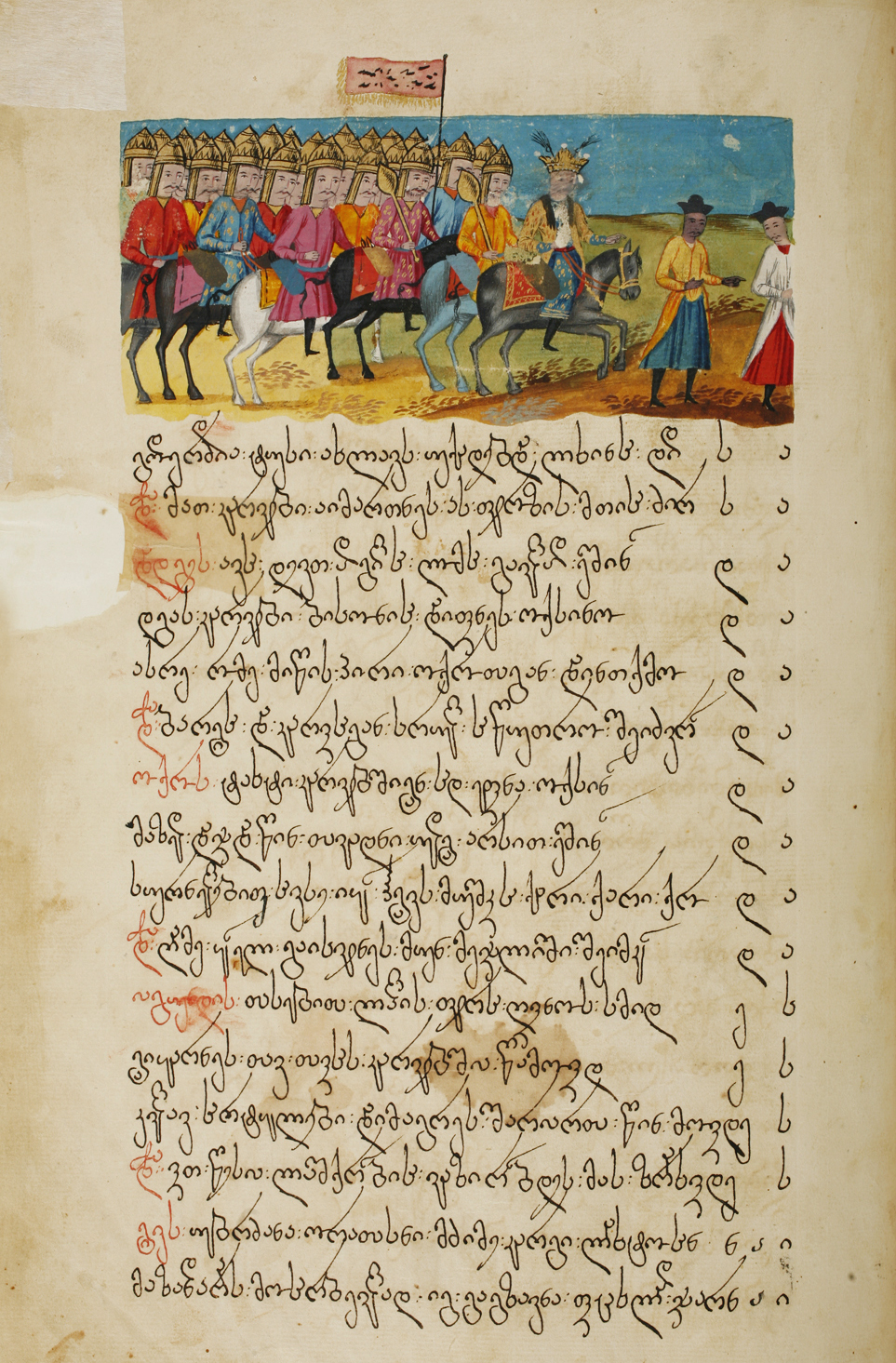
Georgian manuscript of the Shahnameh written in the Georgian script.

Starting from the early 16th century, although certain aspects of more recent times were already incorporated since the 12th century, until the course of the 19th century, Georgian literature became significantly influenced by Persian culture.

Jamshid Sh. Giunashvili remarks on the connection of Georgian culture with that of the Persian literary work Shahnameh:

The names of many Šāh-nāma heroes, such as Rostom-i, Thehmine, Sam-i, or Zaal-i, are found in 11th- and 12th-century Georgian literature. They are indirect evidence for an Old Georgian translation of the Šāh-nāma that is no longer extant. ...

The Šāh-nāma was translated, not only to satisfy the literary and aesthetic needs of readers and listeners, but also to inspire the young with the spirit of heroism and Georgian patriotism. Georgian ideology, customs, and worldview often informed these translations because they were oriented toward Georgian poetic culture. Conversely, Georgians consider these translations works of their native literature. Georgian versions of the Šāh-nāma are quite popular, and the stories of Rostam, and Sohrāb, or Bījan and Maniža became part of Georgian folklore.

Georgian literary works such as Tamariani, the poem Abdulmesiani, Rustaveli's Vepkhistqaosani and chronicles contain the names of Iranian heroes borrowed from the Shahnama. These include Rustam, KhayKhusraw, Zal, Tur amongst others. The story of Zahak and Fereydun were known in Georgian literature and mention of this story is made in the Kartlis Tskhovreba. Other important books of Persian literature like Jami's Yusuf and Zuleikha, Nizami's Lili o Majnoon, Onsori's Vameq and 'Azraa, the story of Salaman and Absal, and the famous Vis o Ramin were known in the literary circles of Georgia. An early Georgian translation of Vis o Ramin predates an extant Persian manuscript and has been used by scholars to produce a critical edition of Vis o Ramin.

The familiarity of Georgian authors with the Persian classics also played a significant role in the development of Georgian literature. Monumental works such as the epic romance Amiran-Darejaniani ascribed to Mose Khoneli, Tamariani by Grigol Chakhrukhadze (12th century), Abdulmesiani by Iovane Shavteli and, finally, the masterpiece of Georgian poetry Vepkhistqaosani (The man in the panther skin) by Shota Rustaveli were written during this era of cultural synthesis.

== Trade ==
A trade and caravan route crossed the territory of Georgia by which raw silk, wine, fruits, Furs, Kakhetian walnuts (annually 4000 camel-loads of Kakhetian walnuts were exported to Safavid Iran), Kakhetian horses (known as "gurji"), various vegetables, and madder were imported by Iran from Georgia.

Georgian documentary sources supply abundant evidence that Georgian imported extensively from Iran. Georgian “Dowry Books” very often refer to clothes make from fabrics manufactured in Iran, such as daraia of Yazd, wool of Kerman, daraya of Gilan, wool of Rizaiyh, sheidish of Yezd, and of Khar. Frequently mentioned among valuable fabrics are zarbab, darayabavt and diba. In the 17th and 18th centuries, precious stones were also imported from Iran. “Dowry Books” make frequent mention of Nishapur turquoise, Badakhshan ruby, jacinth, pearls, emerald.

== See also ==
- Georgia–Iran relations
- Iranian Georgians
- History of the Caucasus
- Persian Empire
- Treaty of Gulistan
- Treaty of Turkmenchay

== Sources ==
- Braund, David (1994). Georgia in Antiquity: A History of Colchis and Transcaucasian Iberia 550 BC–AD 562. Clarendon Press. ISBN 0-19-814473-3.
- Chkeidze, Thea (2001). "Georgia v. Linguistic Contacts with Iranian Languages". Encyclopaedia Iranica, Vol. X, Fasc. 5. pp. 486–490.
- Fisher, William Bayne; Avery, P.; Hambly, G. R. G; Melville, C. (1991). The Cambridge History of Iran. Vol. 7. Cambridge: Cambridge University Press. ISBN 0521200954.
- Hitchins, Keith (2001). "Georgia ii. History of Iranian-Georgian Relations". Encyclopaedia Iranica, Vol. X, Fasc. 4. pp. 464–470.
- Mikaberidze, Alexander (2011). Conflict and Conquest in the Islamic World: A Historical Encyclopedia. Vol. 1. ABC-CLIO. ISBN 978-1598843361.
- Tsetskhladze, Gocha R. (1992). "The Cult of Mithras in Ancient Colchis". Revue de l'histoire des religions. 209 (2 (AVRIL - JUIN)): 115–124.
