= Pharasmanes =

Pharasmanes or Pharsman (Georgian: ფარსმან) may refer to:

== People ==
- Pharasmanes I, Georgian king
- Pharasmanes II, Georgian king
- Pharasmanes III, Georgian king
- Pharasmanes IV, Georgian king
- Pharasmanes V, Georgian king
- Pharasmanes VI, Georgian king

== Places ==
- Parsman, Iran, a village in Markazi Province, Iran
