= Bacurius II =

6th-century Georgian king

King of Iberia
- Reign: 534–547
- Predecessor: Dachi
- Successor: Pharasmanes V
- Dynasty: Chosroid dynasty

Bakur II (Georgian: ბაკურ II, Latinized as Bacurius), of the Chosroid Dynasty, was a king (mepe) of Iberia (natively known as Kartli; ancient Georgia) from 534 to 547.

The name Bacurius is the Latin form of the Greek Bakour (Βάκουρ), itself a variant of the Middle Iranian Pakur, derived from Old Iranian bag-puhr ('son of a god'). The name "Bakur" is the Georgian (ბაკურ) and Armenian (Բակուր) attestation of Middle Iranian Pakur.

Bakur was the son and successor of King Dachi. According to the medieval Georgian chronicler Juansher, he died leaving young children and Iberia fell under Sassanid control. He had two children, Pharasmanes V and one of the parents of Pharasmanes VI.

== See also ==
- Sasanian Iberia

Preceded by Dachi	King of Iberia; 534–547	Succeeded by Parsman V
