= Mihrdat IV =

King of Iberia from c. 409 to 411

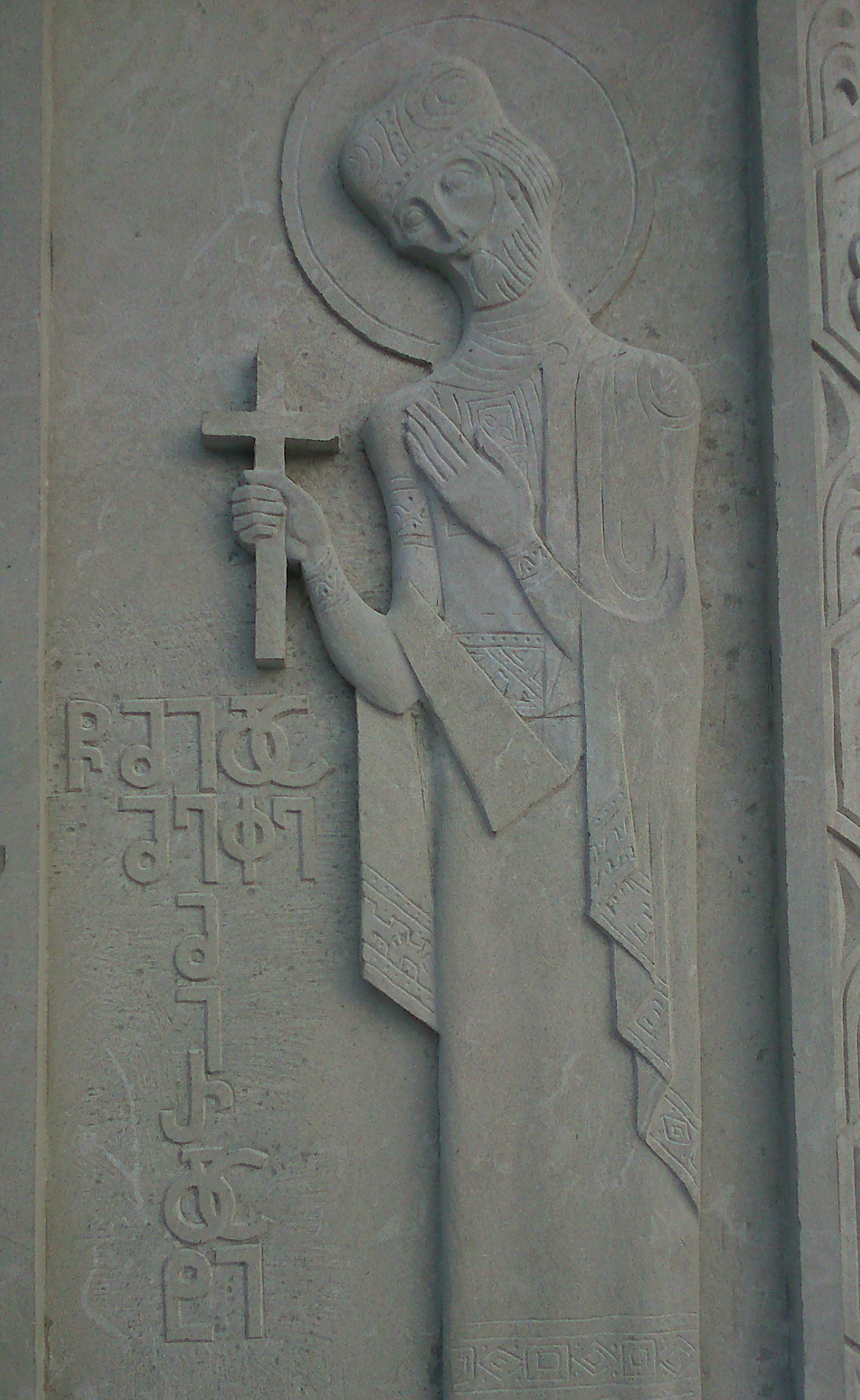
- Relief of Mihrdat IV

King of Iberia
- Reign: c. 409 – c. 411
- Predecessor: Pharasmanes IV
- Successor: Archil
- Issue: Archil
- Dynasty: Chosroid dynasty
- Father: Aspacures III
- Mother: daughter of Trdat

Mihrdat IV (Georgian: მირდატ IV, Latinized as Mithridates), of the Chosroid Dynasty, was the king (mepe) of Iberia (Kartli, eastern Georgia) from c. 409 to 411.

He was the son of Aspacures III and the grandson (on his mother’s side) of Trdat. The Georgian chronicles criticizes him for impiety and neglect of religious building, and informs us that he opposed both major regional powers, the Roman and Sassanid empires. Defeated by the Sassanid army, he was captured and deported to Iran, where he died.

Preceded by Parsman IV	King of Iberia; 409-411	Succeeded by Archil
