= Gushnasp =

Gushnasp is a surname. Notable people with the name include:

- Adhur Gushnasp, marzban of the Sasanian province of Armenia from 465 to 482
- Arvand Gushnasp, Iranian nobleman, briefly marzban (governor) of Sasanian Iberia from 540 to 541
- Aspad Gushnasp, Iranian commander (hazarbed) of the Sasanian royal guard,
- Azen Gushnasp, Iranian statesman, minister (wuzurg framadār) of the Sasanian king Hormizd IV (r. 579–590),
- Bahram Gushnasp, aka Bargousnas, Iranian military officer from the House of Mihran
- Izad Gushnasp, aka Yezatvshnasp or Yazdan, Sasanian nobleman of Parthian or Daylamite origin
- Izedh Gushnasp, aka Izadgushasp, Iranian nobleman from the House of Mihran, and one of Khosrow I's viziers
- Mah-Adhur Gushnasp, aka Mahadharjushnas, Iranian nobleman, wuzurg framadār of the Sasanian Empire
- Namdar Gushnasp, leading Iranian military leader in 7th-century Sasanian Iran
- Piran Gushnasp, aka Grigor, Iranian commander from the House of Mihran

== See also ==
- Adur Gushnasp, the name of a Zoroastrian sacred fire of the highest grade (Atash Behram)
