= Vache of Iberia =

King of Iberia (Georgia) of the 3rd century

Vache

King of Iberia
- Reign: 213–231 or 216–234
- Predecessor: Rev I
- Successor: Bacurius I
- Died: 231 or 234
- Issue: Bacurius
- Dynasty: Arsacids
- Father: Rev I
- Mother: Sephelia
- Religion: Georgian paganism

Vache (Georgian: ვაჩე) was a king (mepe) of Iberia of the Arsacid dynasty who reigned for 18 years in the early 3rd century. Though he ruled during a time of great geopolitical changes for the South Caucasus region, nothing is known of his reign.

== Biography ==
Vache was the son of King Rev I the Just and his wife, Greek Princess Sephelia. As such, he was a member of the cadet branch of the Arsacid dynasty that ruled over the Kingdom of Iberia since 189. Little is known on the life of King Vache, who acceded the throne upon his father's death in 213 (according to Marie-Félicité Brosset) or 216 (according to Cyril Toumanoff). He probably reigned as a client king of the Roman Empire, although it is not known whether or not he took part in the Parthian war of Caracalla.

Under his reign, Persian King Ardashir I was crowned in 226, giving birth to the Sassanian Empire and launching a new page in the Roman-Persian conflict that placed Iberia at the center of wars between the two empires.

King Vache died after a reign of 18 years, in 231 or 234. He left on the throne his son Bacurius I.

== Bibliography ==
- Toumanoff, Cyril (1990). Les dynasties de la Caucasie chrétienne de l'Antiquité jusqu'au xixe siècle : Tables généalogiques et chronologiques [Dynasties of Christian Caucasus, from Ancient Times to the 19th century: Genealogical and Chronological Tables] (in French). Rome.
- Toumanoff, Cyril (1969). Chronology of the early Kings of Iberia. Traditio.
- Brosset, Marie-Félicité (1849). Histoire de la Géorgie depuis l'Antiquité jusqu'au XIXe siècle. Volume I [History of Georgia from Ancient Times to the 19th Century, Volume 1] (in French). Saint-Petersburg: Imperial Academy of Sciences.
