= Eustathius of Mtskheta =

Orthodox Christian saint (died c. 550)

Saint Eustathius of Mtskheta
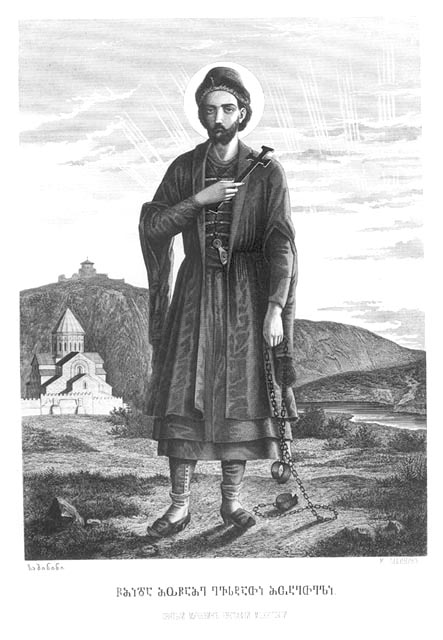
- Eustathius of Mtskheta (Sabinin, 1882)

Martyr
- Born: 6th century Ganzak
- Died: c. 550; Tbilisi, Sasanian Iberia
- Venerated in: Eastern Orthodox Church
- Major shrine: Svetitskhoveli Cathedral, Mtskheta
- Feast: July 29

Eustathius or Eustace of Mtskheta (Evstat'i Mtskhet'eli; Georgian: ევსტათი მცხეთელი) (died c. 550) was a Persian Christian saint, executed for his apostasy from Zoroastrianism by the Sasanian military authorities in Caucasian Iberia (Kartli, eastern Georgia). His story is related in the anonymous 6th-century Georgian hagiographic work The Passion of Eustathius of Mtskheta.

One of the earliest extant works of Georgian literature, The Passion of Eustathius of Mtskheta (მარტჳლობაჲ და მოთმინებაჲ წმიდისა ევსტათი მცხეთელისაჲ), was written by an anonymous author in the later 6th century, within thirty years of Eustathius' reported death. The morphology of the work, as well as its theological terminology, also supports this dating, although the earliest surviving manuscript dates from around 1000 (Georgian National Center of Manuscripts, MSS H-341). The text is also notable for containing the earliest Georgian formulation of the Ten Commandments, an account of the life of Jesus that recalls Tatian's Diatessaron (a Gospel harmony of the 2nd century), and traces of the influence of the 2nd-century Apology of Aristides. The Passion was first published by Mikhail Sabinin in 1882.

Eustathius is reported by the hagiographer to have been an Iranian cobbler originally named Gvirobandak, the son of a high-ranking Zoroastrian priest (magi), from Ganzak. Having converted to Christianity, he fled persecution and came to Georgia (Iberia), then under Iranian military authority, in 541. He settled in the Christian town of Mtskheta and married a Christian woman. The local Iranian cobblers' guild denounced Eustathius to the marzban Arvand Gushnasp, together with seven other converts, to be judged. Arvand punished the apostates by having their noses pierced and imprisoned them under sentence of death. Six months later, Arvand released them as a farewell gesture to the local population when he was recalled from Georgia by King Khosrau I. Four years later, under the new marzban Vezhan Buzmihr, Eustathius was rearrested but reaffirmed his faith before the court in a speech of around 3,000 words that makes up nearly half of The Passion. Eventually, the marzban, although reluctant, ordered his execution by beheading in Tbilisi. The remains of Eustathius were taken to Mtskheta and buried in its principal church.

== Sources ==
- Rapp, Stephen H. (2014). The Sasanian World through Georgian Eyes: Caucasia and the Iranian Commonwealth in Late Antique Georgian Literature. Ashgate Publishing, Ltd. pp. 46–49. ISBN 978-1472425522.
