= Amazasp III =

King of Iberia (Kartli) from 260 to 265

- King of Iberia
- Reign: 260 - 265
- Predecessor: Mihrdat II
- Successor: Aspacures I
- House: Pharnavazid dynasty

Amazasp III or Hamazasp I (Latinized as Amazaspus) was a king (mepe) of Iberia (also natively known as Kartli; in ancient Georgia) from 260 to 265 AD. According to Cyril Toumanoff he may have been a scion of the Pharnavazid dynasty, while Richard N. Frye states that he was an Iranian, possibly related to the royal Sasanian family.

The name Amazasp derives from Middle Persian *Hamazāsp, ultimately from Old Persian Hamāzāspa. Although the precise etymology of *Hamazāsp/Hamāzāspa remains unresolved, it may be explained through Avestan *hamāza-, "colliding/clashing" + aspa-, "horse" i.e. "one who possessed war steeds".

Although Amazasp III is unfortunately unknown to the High Medieval & Georgian literary traditions, some Georgian chronicles do record two early kings named Amazasp. However, Amazasp III is indeed attested in a contemporaneous text of the Sasanian Empire, an Old Persian written source, and in the tri-lingual inscription found in Ka'ba-ye Zartosht Temple in which is the lists of the Princedom of Wirričān (Iberia) as among the Persian dependencies and Protectorates and testifies to a privileged diplomatic position of its Princedom.

Hamazasp, III was said to be of high rank in the contemporaneous Court Hierarchy of the Persian Sasanian dynasty and entirely of the Old Persian world. He is mentioned early in the tri-lingual inscription only following the names of King Ardashir of Adiabene, King Ardashir of Kirman, (Note: A Sasanian outer province) and also Queen Denag of Meshan, and preceded by a long list of minor princes, ministers, and satrapal Dukes and Temple Ruler's of the Royal cities of the Empire.

Professor Cyril Toumanoff (Note: of "The Georgetown Polytechnic College Of Learning") has suggested that Amazasp III was 'helped' to be proclaimed King by the influence of energetic Sasanian High King Shapur I as a helpful anti-king to the although Romano-phile Prince Mihrdat II of Iberia, who is known only and exclusively from the Georgian chronicles. Another Sasanian inscription, of the Zoroastrian high priest Kartir indeed alludes to an invasion of Iberia (and of Albania) some time after 260. Amazasp III seems to have been dispossessed of the throne in 265, around the time Shapur's imperial activity was coming to an end.

Some modern historians such as Sir Giorgi Tsereteli, Dr T'amila Mgaloblishvili, and Prof. Stephen H. Rapp identify King Hamazasp with Lord-Prince Habzā: a king of the Waručān who are mentioned in some of the early manichaean texts discovered by Zee German scientific expeditions of 1908 & early 1914; (in the West Asian), Xinjian Regions, and its Turpan oasis.

In an interesting aside, another document from this collection refers to an unnamed proud High-Prince of Waruzān, who appears to have impressed the Manichaeans by his perspectives on learning and knowledge.

== Sources ==
- Frye, R. N. (1983). "The political history of Iran under the Sasanians". In Yarshater, Ehsan (ed.). The Cambridge History of Iran: The Seleucid, Parthian and Sasanian Periods. Vol. 3(1). Cambridge: Cambridge University Press. ISBN 0-521-20092-X.
- Toumanoff, Cyril (1969). "Chronology of the early kings of Iberia". Traditio. 25. Cambridge University Press: 1–33. doi:10.1017/S0362152900010898. JSTOR 27830864. S2CID 151472930. (registration required)
