= Mihrdat II =

King of Iberia (Kartli) from 249 to 265

King of Iberia
- Reign: 249–265
- Predecessor: Bacurius I
- Successor: Aspacures I
- Dynasty: Arsacid dynasty of Iberia

Mihrdat II (Georgian: მირდატ II, Latinized as Mithridates), of the Arsacid dynasty, was a king (mepe) of Iberia (natively known as Kartli; ancient Georgia) from 249 to 265 AD.

He is known exclusively from the medieval Georgian chronicles which make him either 22nd or 24th in the royal list of Iberia and merely relates that Mihrdat was the son of Bakur I. Professor Cyril Toumanoff hypothesized that there was the other Iberian king, Amazasp III (r. 260-265), at that time, probably installed as an anti-king by Shapur I, Great King of Iran. This Amazasp is known from the Sassanid inscriptions, but is unattested in Georgian literary sources.

Preceded by Bakur I	King of Iberia; 249–265; Amazasp III, anti-king 260–265	Succeeded by Aspagur I
