= Pharnabazus =

Pharnabazus or Pharnabazos (Greek: Φαρνάβαζος) is the Hellenized form of an ancient Persian name. It may refer to:

- Pharnabazus I of Iberia (326–234 BCE), king of Iberia
- Pharnabazus II of Iberia (63–32 BCE), king of Iberia
- Pharnabazus I (fl. 455–430 BCE), satrap of Hellespontine Phrygia
- Pharnabazus II (fl. 422–387 BCE), grandson of the above, satrap of Hellespontine Phrygia
- Pharnabazus III (c. 370 – after 320 BC), grandson of the above, a general who resisted the invasion of Alexander the Great.
- Pharnavaz, alternative form of the name
