= Dachi of Iberia =

6th-century Georgian king

Dachi

King of Iberia
- Reign: 522–534
- Predecessor: Vakhtang I
- Successor: Bacurius II
- Issue: Bacurius II
- Dynasty: Chosroid dynasty
- Father: Vakhtang I

Dachi (Georgian: დაჩი, also Darchi, დარჩი, or Darchil, დარჩილი), of the Chosroid Dynasty, was the king (mepe) of Iberia (Kartli, eastern Georgia) reigning, according to a medieval Georgian literary tradition, for 12 years, from c. 522 to 534. He was given a territorial epithet Ujarmeli (უჯარმელი, i.e., "of/from Ujarma") for having spent years at his residence at Ujarma.

The name Dachi derives from Middle Persian Dārčīhr, itself being a compound of the Iranian words dar ("court, palace") and čihr[ag] ("seed, origin").

According to the medieval Georgian chronicles, Dachi was the eldest son of King Vakhtang I Gorgasal by Balendukht, daughter of the Iranian Sassanid king Hormizd III. He succeeded his father, who had launched an abortive rebellion against the Sassanid hegemony, and took a more conciliatory line with his Iranian suzerains. From his base at Ujarma in Kakheti, which had constituted the royal demesne from the days of the early Chosroids, he spent special missionary efforts to further Christianize his mountainous subjects. He also enlarged the town of Tbilisi and completed the construction of its citadel which had been founded by his father. Dachi was succeeded by his son, Bacurius II.

Preceded by Vakhtang I	King of Iberia; 522–534	Succeeded by Bacurius II
