= Aspacures III =

King of Iberia, an ancient Georgian state

King of Iberia
- Reign: c. 380 – c. 394
- Predecessor: Mihrdat III
- Successor: Trdat
- Died: c. 394
- Spouse: daughter of Trdat
- Issue: Pharasmanes IV; Mihrdat IV
- Dynasty: Chosroid dynasty
- Father: Mihrdat III

Aspacures III (or Varaz-Bakur II, Georgian: ვარაზ-ბაკურ II), of the Chosroid Dynasty, was the king (mepe) of Iberia (Kartli, eastern Georgia) from c. 380 to 394.

== Biography ==
He was the son and successor of Mirdat III and was married to the daughter of Trdat, his relative and successor.

He is credited by the Georgian chronicles with the construction of the church of Tsilkani.

During his reign, the Roman Empire signed the Peace of Acilisene with Sassanid Iran in which it admitted to the loss of Iberia and a greater portion of Armenia. His sons were Pharasmanes and Mihrdat.

Preceded by Mihrdat III	King of Iberia; 380–394	Succeeded by Trdat
