= Dual kingship =

Dual kingship may refer to:

- a single monarch ruling two realms, see Personal union
- two monarchs ruling a single realm, see Diarchy
