= Mihrdat III =

King of Iberia, an ancient Georgian state

King of Iberia
- Reign: 365–380 (Diarchy 370–378)
- Predecessor: Aspacures II
- Successor: Aspacures III
- Dynasty: Chosroid dynasty
- Father: Aspacures II

Mihrdat III (Georgian: მირდატ III, Latinized as Mithridates), of the Chosroid dynasty, was the king (mepe) of Iberia (Kartli, eastern Georgia) from c. 365 to 380 (diarch 370–378).

Mihrdat succeeded his father, Varaz-Bakur known as Aspacures to the contemporaneous historian Ammianus Marcellinus and installed by Shapur II, the Sassanid king of Iran on the place of his nephew Sauromaces. Mihrdat is unknown to Ammianus who continues to refer to him as Aspacures (Amm. 27.12; 30.2).

Around 370, the Iranian intervention in Iberia drew a Roman response, and Ammianus reports an expedition sent by Emperor Valens to restore Sauromaces to the throne of Iberia. When the Roman legions reached the river Cyrus, their commander Terentius and Sauromaces forged a deal with Aspacures to divide the kingdom in two along the river. Aspacures indicated that he had considered defecting to Rome, but feared for the life of his son Vitra, who was by then a hostage at the Sassanid court. He was permitted to retain control of northeastern Iberia, while Sauromaces was established in the southwest. This situation is reflected in Leonti Mroveli’s story of the defection of the people of Klarjeti (in Iberia’s southwest) to the Romans.

After the Roman defeat at Adrianople, Sauromaces was probably expelled in 378 and Aspacures presumably regained the whole kingdom.

Preceded by Aspacures II	King of Iberia; 365–380; Diarch 370–378	Succeeded by Aspacures III
