= Pharasmanes IV =

King of Iberia, an ancient Georgian state

Parsamanes IV

King of Iberia
- Reign: c. 406 – c. 409
- Predecessor: Trdat
- Successor: Mihrdat IV
- Died: c. 409
- Dynasty: Chosroid dynasty
- Father: Aspacures III
- Mother: daughter of Trdat

P'arsman IV (Georgian: ფარსმან IV, sometimes Latinized as Pharasmanes), of the Chosroid Dynasty, was the king (mepe) of Iberia (Kartli, eastern Georgia) from 406 to 409.

According to the medieval Georgian chronicles, he was the son of King Varaz-Bakur II and the daughter of Trdat of Iberia. Characterized as a pious monarch and an exceptional warrior, he is reported to have rebelled against the Iranian hegemony and have withheld paying tribute to the shah. He is also credited with the construction of Bolnisi.

P’arsman is identified by some scholars with the Pharasmanes of the Syriac Vita Petri Iberi who was a brother of Osdukhtia, the paternal grandmother of Peter the Iberian, a well-known Georgian theologian and one of the leaders of anti-Chalcedonian movement in the Eastern Roman Empire. Pharasmanes enjoyed a leading position at the Roman court and held the rank of a magister militum under Emperor Arcadius until being accused of committing adultery with the empress Eudoxia. He escaped back to Iberia where he became king and encouraged the White Huns to attack the Roman frontiers. He was succeeded by his brother, who became Mihrdat IV.

Preceded by Trdat	King of Iberia; 406–409	Succeeded by Mihrdat IV
