= Aspacures II =

King of Iberia, an ancient Georgian state

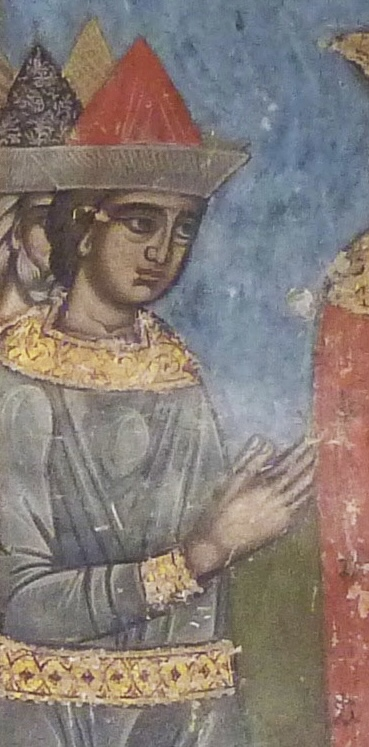
- Aspacures II, fresco from the Svetitskhoveli Cathedral.

King of Iberia
- Reign: 363–365
- Predecessor: Sauromaces II
- Successor: Mihrdat III
- Issue: Mihrdat III
- Dynasty: Chosroid
- Father: Mirian III
- Mother: Nana of Iberia

Aspacures II (or Varaz-Bakur I, Georgian: ვარაზ-ბაკურ I), of the Chosroid dynasty, was the king (mepe) of Iberia (Kartli, eastern Georgia) from c. 363 to 365. He was the second son of Mirian III and Nana of Iberia.

== Biography ==
His name, recorded by the contemporaneous historian Ammianus Marcellinus (XXVII 12. 16), is evidently a Latinized rendition of Varaz-Bakur or Varaz-Bakar of the later, early medieval, Georgian chronicles. According to Ammianus, Aspacures was made king of Iberia by the Sassanid King Shapur II after the overthrow of his nephew Sauromaces. His being described as "an impious man and a hater of the faith" by the Georgian chronicler Leonti Mroveli is significant in this regard: the term implied at that time Zoroastrianism religious sympathies; and connote also his pro-Iranian political orientation. Leonti, indeed, then goes on to tell us of his becoming a Sassanid vassal.

Preceded by Sauromaces II	King of Iberia; 363–365	Succeeded by Mihrdat III
