= Pharasmanes V =

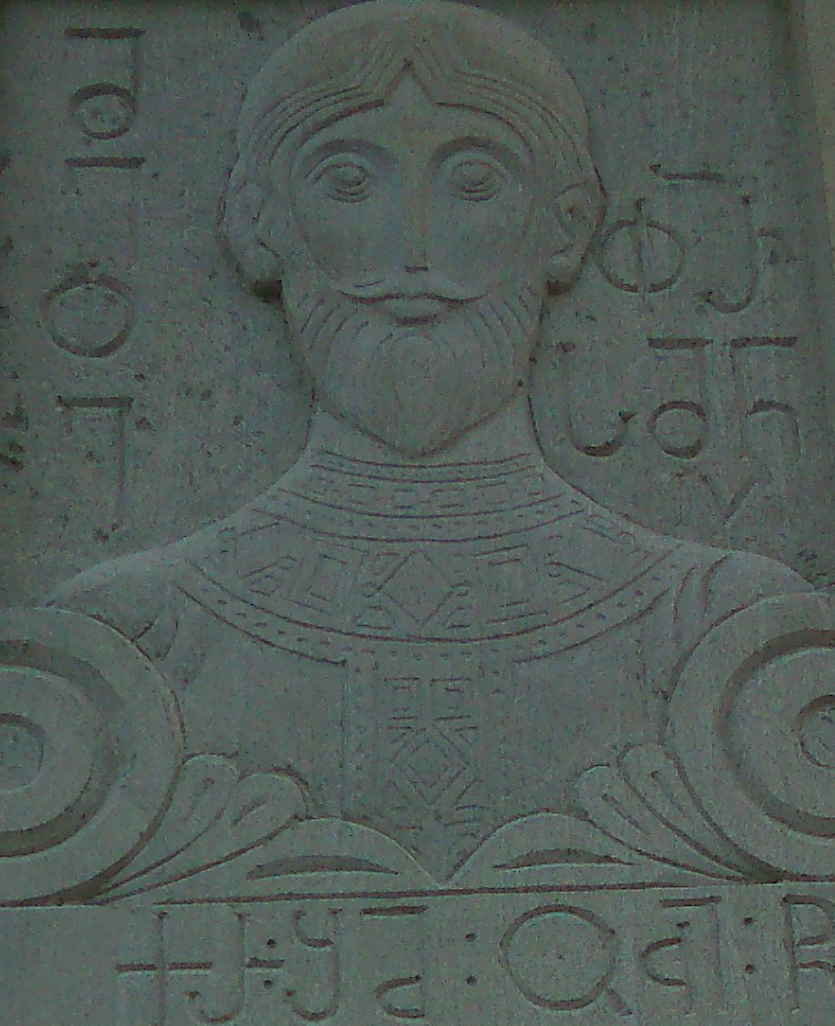
- Relief of Pharasmanes V

King of Iberia
- Reign: 547–561
- Predecessor: Bacurius II of Iberia
- Successor: Pharasmanes VI of Iberia
- Dynasty: Chosroid dynasty
- Father: Bacurius II of Iberia
- Religion: Georgian Orthodox Church

P'arsman V (Georgian: ფარსმან V, sometimes Latinized as Pharasmanes), of the Chosroid Dynasty, was the king (mepe) of Iberia (Kartli, eastern Georgia) from 547 to 561.

Parsman was the son and successor of Bakur II, and was succeeded by his nephew P'arsman VI.

According to the medieval Armenian adaptation of the Georgian Chronicles, in the reign of Parsman, the Ossetians (Georgian designation for Alans) attacked and ravaged Kartli, prompting Parsman to place himself under the Persian protection on terms of paying tribute. However, this version differs from that given by the Georgian original in the History of King Vakhtang Gorgasali, where nothing is said about the Alans and an unprovoked Persian aggression is recalled.

Preceded by Bakur II	King of Iberia; 547–561	Succeeded by P'arsman VI
