= Sasanian Iberia =

Period of Sasanian suzerainty over Iberia

Sasanian Iberia 𐭥𐭫𐭥𐭰𐭠𐭭 wirucān
- 255/6–299^{a} 363–580^{b} 580–627^{c}
- Map of the Caucasus in 387–591
- Status: Vassal/Province of the Sasanian Empire
- Capital: Armazi; Mtskheta; Tbilisi
- Common languages: Old Georgian (native language/numismatics/chancery); Middle Persian (numismatics/chancery/court); Parthian; Koine Greek and Syriac (religious)
- Government: Fully subordinate monarchy (up to 580), governorate
- Historical era: Antiquity
  - Established: 255/6
  - Roman conquest: 299
  - Sasanian reconquest under Shapur II: 363
  - Marzbanate period starts: 580
  - Adarnase I declares independence: 627
Preceded by	Succeeded by
Kingdom of Iberia	Byzantine Empire; Principality of Iberia
- 1. Shapur I conquers Iberia in ca. 255/6, and puts the country under the control of a bidaxsh. The Sasanian Empire later cedes Iberia to the Romans in 299 after a peace treaty.; 2. Shapur II invades Iberia in 363 and installs Aspacures II as his vassal. The Sasanians continue to rule Iberia for decades with two brief interruptions in 482-484 and 502-518. In 580, Hormizd IV decides to abolish the Iberian monarchy.; 3. The Kingdom of Iberia is once and for all abolished by Hormizd IV, who appoints a marzban of the country, thus starting the "Marzbanate period" of Iberia. In 591, Khosrow II cedes a large part of Iberia to the Romans, and later briefly regains it in 604 until ca. 624/5. In 627, the Iberian prince Adarnase I rebels against a heavily weakened Sasanian Empire, thus ending Sasanian rule in the country.

Sasanian Iberia (Georgian: სასანური ქართლი, romanized: sasanuri kartli; Middle Persian: 𐭥𐭫𐭥𐭰𐭠𐭭, wirōzān/wiruzān/wiručān) was the period the Kingdom of Iberia (Kartli, eastern Georgia) was under the suzerainty of the Sasanian Empire. The period includes when it was ruled by Marzbans (governors) appointed by the Sasanid Iranian king, and later through the Principality of Iberia.

== Name ==
All exonyms are likely derived from gorgān (گرگان), the Persian designation of the Georgians, evolving from Parthian wurgān (𐭅𐭓𐭊𐭍) and Middle Persian wiručān (𐭥𐭫𐭥𐭰𐭠𐭭), rooting out from Old Persian vrkān (𐎺𐎼𐎣𐎠𐎴) meaning "the land of the wolves". This is also reflected in Old Armenian virk (վիրք), it being a source of Ancient Greek ibēríā (Ἰβηρία), that entered Latin as Hiberia. The transformation of vrkān into gorgān and alteration of v into g was a phonetic phenomenon in the word formation of Proto-Aryan and ancient Iranian languages. All exonyms are simply phonetic variations of the same root vrk/varka (𐎺𐎼𐎣) meaning wolf.

== History ==
The Georgian kingdoms were contested between the Sasanids and the neighboring rivalling Roman-Byzantine Empire ever since the 3rd century. Over the span of the next hundreds of years, both the Byzantines and the Sasanids managed to establish hegemony over these regions. At the few remaining times, the Georgian kings managed to retain their autonomy. Sasanian governance was established for the first time early on in the Sasanian era, during the reign of King Shapur I (r. 240-270). In 284, the Sasanians secured the Iberian throne for an Iranian prince from the House of Mihran, subsequently known by his dynastic name Mirian III. Mirian III became thus the first head of this branch of the Mihranid family in the Kingdom of Iberia, known as the Chosroid dynasty (otherwise known as the Iberian Mihranids, or Mihranids of Iberia), whose members would rule Iberia into the sixth century.

The Roman-Persian peace treaty of Nisibis in 299 recognized the Roman suzerainty over Iberia and Armenia. In 363, Sasanian suzerainty was restored by king Shapur II (r. 309-379) when he invaded Iberia and installed Aspacures II as his vassal on the Iberian throne.

The continuing rivalry between Byzantium and Sasanian Persia for supremacy in the Caucasus, and the unsuccessful insurrection (523) of the Georgians under Gurgen had severe consequences for the country. Thereafter, the king of Iberia had only nominal power, while the country was effectively ruled by the Persians. By the time of Vezhan Buzmihr's tenure as marzban of Iberia, the hagiographies of the period implied that the "kings" in Tbilisi had only the status of mamasakhlisi, which means "head of the (royal) house". When Bakur III died in 580, the Sassanid government of Persia under Hormizd IV (578-590) seized on the opportunity to abolish the Iberian monarchy. Iberia became a Persian province, administrated through its direct rule by appointed marzbans, which in fact was, as Prof. Donald Rayfield states; "a de jure continuation of de facto abolition of Iberian kingship since the 520s".

The Iberian nobles acquiesced to this change without resistance, while the heirs of the royal house withdrew to their highland fortresses – the main Chosroid line in Kakheti, and the younger Guaramid branch in Klarjeti and Javakheti. However, the direct Persian control brought about heavy taxation and an energetic promotion of Zoroastrianism in a largely Christian country. Therefore, when the Eastern Roman emperor Maurice embarked upon a military campaign against Persia in 582, the Iberian nobles requested that he helped restore the monarchy. Maurice did respond, and, in 588, sent his protégé, Guaram I of the Guaramids, as a new ruler to Iberia. However, Guaram was not crowned as king, but recognized as a presiding prince and bestowed with the Eastern Roman title of curopalates. The Byzantine-Sassanid treaty of 591 confirmed this new rearrangement, but left Iberia divided into Roman- and Sassanid-dominated parts at the town of Tbilisi. Mtskheta came to be under Byzantine control.

Guaram's successor, the second presiding prince Stephen I (Stephanoz I), reoriented his politics towards Persia in a quest to reunite a divided Iberia, a goal he seems to have accomplished, but this cost him his life when the Byzantine emperor Heraclius attacked Tbilisi in 626, during the Byzantine–Sasanian War of 602–628, marking the definite Byzantine predominance in most of Georgia by 627-628 at the expense of the Sasanids until the Muslim conquest of Persia.

== Protection, construction activities and settlers ==
As the Sasanians established predominance in the Caucasus, they obtained an additional weapon that could be used against the Roman-Byzantines. The dynasty of governors (that is, the bidakhsh) headquartered at Armazi provided the Sasanians with protection of the route along the Kur river, as well as the more northern route that ran along the Aragvi (Aragus) river to the Darial pass (i.e. the Iberian/Caucasus/Alan Gates). Beyond this pass, lay an area that was known as "the country of the nomads" according to Strabo. With the established Sasanian hegemony, the incursion of nomads into the Sasanian realm could be hindered. The Iranologist Anahit Perikhanian explains that as time passed by, however, as the Hun tribes increased their pressure from the late 4th century, paying off the tribes had probably become an equally important tool of defense as well. The Sasanian King of Kings (Shahanshah) Khosrow I (r. 531–579) successfully recruited the Huns as auxiliaries as demonstrated in the Lazic War, but he also sponsored the construction of fortifications at numerous sites around the area of Tiflis-Gardman, Sughdabil, as well as al-Lāl.

The kingdoms of the Caucasus, as well as Armenia, had acquired an Iranian population element from the time of the early Scythian invasion of the area in the 1st millennium BC. By the time of Khosrow I's fortification activities, a large number of Iranians were settled in this region, including Iberia. The imposition of direct Sasanian rule by Khosrow I meant that, in all likelihood, numerous non-combatant settlers alongside troops and officials were moved to the area. It is due to these developments that the Georgian Passion of St. Eusthatius of Mtskheta makes mention of (amongst others) Persian shoemakers living in Mtskheta who adhered to the Zoroastrian religion and their own practises. Following conversion to Christianity, a number of these immigrants to this northwestern part of the empire could have adapted to the local culture.

== Sasanian coinage of Iberia (Georgia) ==
Although various hoards have been found in what is present-day Georgia containing regular Sasanian coinage, no local mint mark has been identified thus far for these regular Sasanian coins. However, so-called Kartvelo-Sasanian coins were produced locally in Kartli during the later period of Sasanid suzerainty and rule over central-eastern Georgia (Iberia of the classical authors), that is, in the late 6th and first half of the 7th century. As all extant coins of this type are decorated on the obverse with an image of either Hormizd IV or Khosrow II, there are no Kartvelo-Sasanian coins that predate Hormizd IV's rule (which started in 579). The production of Kartvelo-Sasanian coins commenced after the suppression of the Iberian monarchy by the Sasanids, dated by Cyril Toumanoff to c. 580.

Kartvelo-Sasanian coins are usually decorated with asomtavruli letters and/or monograms. These monograms usually represented the names of the prominent and contemporaneous eristavis and presiding princes (eristavta-mtavaris) of Iberia. The earliest Kartvelo-Sasanian coins, as part of the first phase, were inscribed JO, which according to Stephen H. Rapp Jr translates as “O, Cross”. Once the Principality of Iberia was firmly established, the inscriptions, in this second phase, shifted to monograms which mentioned the name of the presiding princes. Examples amongst such are GN and GRG, i.e. "Gurgen/Guaram" respectively; both abbreviations are identified with prince Guaram I (r. 588-590). Presiding princes who followed after this phase were even bolder in the presentation of their religious affiliation. In this third and final phase of Kartvelo-Sasanian coins a small cross can be distinguished as a replacement for the sacred Zoroastrian flame atop the fire altar. This series commences with the abbreviation SPNS, i.e. "Stepanoz I", positioned around the image of the Sasanian Shahanshah Hormizd VI. The text does not obstruct the reading of the typically used Middle Persian legend. These adaptations develop further during Stepanoz I's reign (590–627), or perhaps during the reign of Stepanoz II (642–650). In this sub-phase, the full inscription of the name "Stepanoz" can be viewed on both sides of the head of the Sasanian Shahanshah, and the Middle Persian inscription depicting the name and regnal year of the Shahanshah is eliminated.

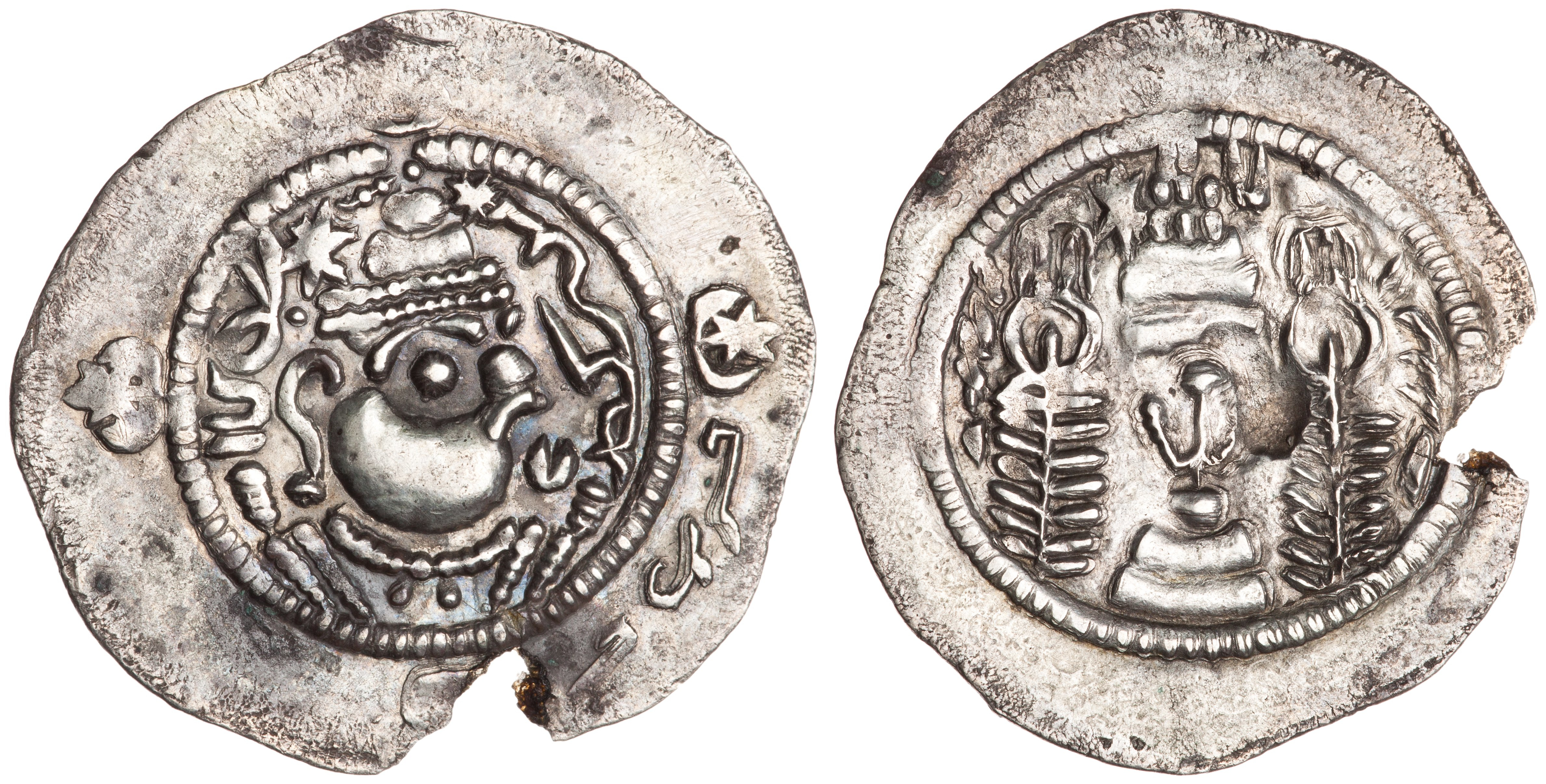
Sasanian type coin of prince Guaram I, with obverse bust of Hormizd IV and asomtavruli inscription GRG, i.e. Gurgen

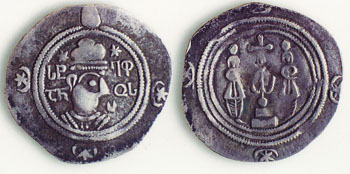
Sasanian type coin of prince Stephen I, with obverse bust of Khosrow II and asomtavruli inscription STEP'ANOS

== Sasanian governors of Iberia ==
- Piran Gushnasp
- Arvand Gushnasp
- Vezhan Buzmihr

== See also ==
- Atashgah of Tbilisi
- Vistahm
- Georgia in the Roman era
- Muslim conquest of Persia
- Principality of Iberia
- Arab rule in Georgia

== Sources ==
- Baumer, Christoph (2021). History of the Caucasus. Vol. 1: At the Crossroads of Empires. I.B. Tauris.
- Brunner, Christopher (1983). "Geographical and Administrative divisions: Settlements and Economy". The Cambridge History of Iran: The Seleucid, Parthian, and Sasanian periods (2). Cambridge: Cambridge University Press. pp. 747–778. ISBN 978-0-521-24693-4.
- Daryaee, Touraj (2009). Sasanian Persia: The Rise and Fall of an Empire. I.B. Tauris.
- Mikaberidze, Alexander (2015). Historical Dictionary of Georgia. Rowman & Littlefield Publishers. ISBN 978-1-4422-4146-6.
- Perikhanian, Anahit (1983). "Iranian society and law". In Yarshater, Ehsan (ed.). The Cambridge History of Iran: The Seleucid, Parthian and Sasanian Periods. Vol. 3(2). Cambridge: Cambridge University Press. ISBN 0-521-24693-8.
- Rapp, Stephen H. (2003). Studies in Medieval Georgian Historiography: Early Texts and Eurasian Contexts. Peeters. ISBN 978-2-87723-723-9.
- Rapp, Stephen H. (2014). The Sasanian World through Georgian Eyes: Caucasia and the Iranian Commonwealth in Late Antique Georgian Literature. Ashgate Publishing. ISBN 978-1472425522.
- Rayfield, Donald (2013). Edge of Empires: A History of Georgia. Reaktion Books. ISBN 978-1780230702.
- Suny, Ronald Grigor (1994). The Making of the Georgian Nation (2nd ed.). Indiana University Press. ISBN 0-253-20915-3.
- Yarshater, Ehsan, ed. (2001). Encyclopaedia Iranica. Vol. 10. Routledge & Kegan Paul. ISBN 978-0-933273-56-6.
