= Bacurius I =

King of Iberia (Kartli) from 234 to 249

King of Iberia
- Reign: 234–249
- Predecessor: Vache
- Successor: Mihrdat II
- Dynasty: Arsacid dynasty

Bakur I (Georgian: ბაკურ I, Latinized as Bacurius), of the Arsacid dynasty, was a king (mepe) of Iberia (natively known as Kartli; ancient Georgia) from 234 to 249.

The name Bacurius is the Latin form of the Greek Bakour (Βάκουρ), itself a variant of the Middle Iranian Pakur, derived from Old Iranian bag-puhr ('son of a god'). The name "Bakur" is the Georgian (ბაკურ) and Armenian (Բակուր) attestation of Middle Iranian Pakur.

He is known exclusively from the medieval Georgian chronicles which make him either 21st or 23rd in the royal list of Iberia and merely relates that Bakur was the son of Vach'e.

Preceded by Vache	King of Iberia; 234–249	Succeeded by Mihrdat II
