= Chosroid dynasty =

Dynasty in medieval Georgia

- Parent house: House of Mihran
- Country: Kingdom of Iberia; Principality of Iberia; Kakheti
- Founded: 284
- Founder: Mirian III of Iberia
- Final ruler: Juansher of Kakheti
- Style: Style of the Georgian sovereign
- Dissolution: c. 807
- Cadet branches: Guaramid dynasty

The Chosroid dynasty (a Latinization of Khosro[v]ianni, Georgian: ხოსრო[ვ]იანები), also known as the Iberian Mihranids, were a dynasty of kings and later presiding princes of the early Georgian state of Iberia from the 4th to the 9th centuries. The family, of Iranian Mihranid origin, accepted Christianity as their official religion c. 337 (or 319/326), and maneuvered between the Byzantine Empire and Sassanid Iran to retain a degree of independence. After the abolition of the Iberian kingship by the Sassanids c. 580, the dynasty survived in its two closely related, but sometimes competing princely branches—the elder Chosroid and the younger Guaramid—down to the early ninth century when they were succeeded by the Georgian Bagratids on the throne of Iberia.

== Origins ==
The Chosroids were a branch of the Mihranid princely family, one of the Seven Great Houses of Iran, who were distantly related to the Sasanians, and whose two other branches were soon placed on the thrones of Gogarene and Gardman, the two Caucasian principalities where the three nations – Armenians, Albanians, and Georgians – commingled.

According to the Georgian Chronicles, the first Chosroid king Mirian III (Mihran) (ruled 284–361 AD) was installed, through his marriage to an Iberian princess Abeshura (daughter of the last Georgian Arsacid king Aspacures I), on the throne of Iberia by his father whom the Georgian chronicles refer to as "Chosroes", Great King of Iran. Another medieval Georgian chronicle, Conversion of Kartli, is at odds with the tradition of Life of the Kings of the Georgian Chronicles and identifies Mirian as the son of King Lev, successor of King Aspacures I. Lev is unattested elsewhere.

== Early Chosroids ==
The ascendance of the Mihranid lines to the thrones of Caucasia was, in fact, a manifestation of the victory of the Sassanids over what remained in the region of the Arsacid dynasty of Parthia whose Armenian branch was now in decline and the Georgian one had already been extinct.

As an Iranian vassal king, Mirian III (ruled 284–361), the founder of the Chosroid dynasty, participated in the Sassanid war against the Roman Empire. However, in the Peace of Nisibis of 298, Rome was acknowledged its suzerainty over eastern Georgia, but recognized Mirian as the king of Iberia. Mirian quickly adapted to the change in the political fabric of Caucasia, and established close ties with Rome. This association was further enhanced after the female Christian missionary, Nino, converted Mirian, his wife Nana and household into Christianity in or around 337. However, the Sassanids continued to vie with Rome for influence over Iberia, and succeeded in temporarily deposing Mirian's Romanophile successor, Sauromaces II, in favor of the pro-Iranian Aspacures II in 361. The Roman emperor Valens intervened and restored Sauromaces to the throne in 370, although Aspacures’ son and successor, Mihrdat III (r. 365–380), was permitted to retain control of the eastern part of the kingdom. However, by 380, the Sassanids had successfully reasserted their claims by reuniting Iberia under the authority of Aspacures III of Iberia (r. 380–394) and began to extract tribute from the country. The Romans evidently admitted the loss of Iberia in the aftermath of the 387 Treaty of Acilisene with Iran. The growth of Iranian influence in eastern Georgia, including the promotion of Zoroastrianism, was resisted by the Christian church and a part of the nobility, the invention of the Georgian alphabet, a crucial instrument in the propagation of Christian learning, being the most important cultural legacy of this struggle. The Chosroid kings of Iberia, albeit Christian, remained generally loyal to their Iranian suzerains until Vakhang I Gorgasali (r. 447–522), perhaps the most popular Chosroid king of Iberia traditionally credited also with the foundation of Georgia’s modern-day capital Tbilisi, reversed his political orientation in 482, bringing his state and church more into line with current Byzantine policy. He then led, in alliance with the Armenian prince Vahan Mamikonian, an open revolt against the Sassanids and continued a desperate, but eventually unsuccessful, struggle until the end of his life.

== Later Chosroids ==
After Vakhtang I's death in 522, the family went in decline and exercised only a limited authority over Iberia, the government being effectively run by the Tbilisi-based Iranian viceroy through the compromise with local princes. When Bacurius III of Iberia died in 580, the Sassanids seized opportunity to abolish the monarchy, without much resistance from the Iberian aristocracy. Dispossessed of the crown, heirs of Vakhtang I remained in their mountain fortresses – the senior Chosroid branch in the province of Kakheti, and the minor one, the Guaramids, in Klarjeti and Javakheti. A member of the latter branch, Guaram I (r. 588–590), revolted, in 588, from the Sassanid rule and pledged his loyalty the Byzantine emperor Maurice, being bestowed with the high Byzantine dignity of curopalates. He succeeded in restoring the autonomy of Iberia in the form of a presiding principate, a rearrangement that was accepted by Iran in the peace of 591, which divided Iberia between Byzantium and Iran at Tbilisi. Guaram's son and successor, Stephanus I (r. 590–627), transferred his allegiance to the Sassanids and reunited Iberia, eventually drawing a vigorous response from the Byzantine emperor Heraclius (610–641), who, in alliance with the Khazars, campaigned in Iberia and captured Tbilisi after an uneasy siege in 627. Heraclius I had Stephanus flayed alive and gave his office to the pro-Byzantine Chosroid prince Adarnase I of Kakheti (r. 627–637/42).

Reinstated by Heraclius, the Chosroid dynasty were persistent in their pro-Byzantine line, but Stephanus II (637/642–c. 650) was forced to recognize himself a tributary to the Arab Caliphate which would eventually become a dominant regional power. Following the death of Adarnase II (r. c. 650–684), the rival Guaramid branch, with Guaram II (684–c. 693), regained power, and the elder Chosroid branch again withdrew into their appanages in Kakheti, where it produced a notable member, Archil, a saint of the Georgian Orthodox Church, martyred at the hands of the Arabs in 786. Upon Archil’s death, his elder son Iovane (died c. 799) evacuated to the Byzantine-dominated region of Egrisi (Lazica) in western Georgia, while his younger son Juansher (r. 786–c. 807) remained in Kakheti and married Latavri, daughter of Prince Adarnase of Erusheti-Artani, the forefather of the Georgian Bagratid dynasty.

The main Chosroid branch outlived its younger Guaramid line, extinct since 786, by two decades. With Juansher’s death in c. 807, it too died out. The Chosroid possessions in Kakheti were taken over by the local noble families who formed a succession of chorepiscopi down to the 11th century, while the Guaramid estates passed to their relatives from the Bagratid dynasty.

== List of the Chosroid rulers ==
=== Kings of Iberia ===
- Mirian III, 284–361
  - Rev, co-king 345–361
- Sauromaces II, 361–363, diarch 370–378
- Aspacures II, 363–365
- Mihrdat III, 365–380, diarch 370–378
- Aspacures III, 380–394
- Trdat, 394–406
- Pharasmanes IV, 406–409
- Mihrdat IV, 409–411
- Archil, 411–435
- Mihrdat V, 435–447
- Vakhtang I, 447–522
- Dachi, 522–534
- Bacurius II, 534–547
- Pharasmanes V, 547–561
- Pharasmanes VI, 561–?
- Bacurius III, ?–580

=== Princes of Kakheti and Presiding Princes of Iberia ===
- Adarnase I, Prince of Kakheti, c. 580–637; Presiding Prince of Iberia, 627–637
- Stephen II, Prince of Kakheti and Presiding Prince of Iberia, 637–c. 650
- Adarnase II, Prince of Kakheti and Presiding Prince of Iberia, c. 650–684
- Stephen, Prince of Kakheti, 685–736
- Mirian, Prince of Kakheti, 736–741
- Archil “the Martyr”, Prince of Kakheti, 736–786
- John, Prince of Kakheti, 786–790
- Juansher, Prince of Kakheti, 786–807

== See also ==
- Guaramid dynasty
- Juansheriani

== Sources ==
- Bardakjian, Kevork; La Porta, Sergio (2014). The Armenian Apocalyptic Tradition: A Comparative Perspective. BRILL. ISBN 978-9004270268.
- Yarshater, Ehsan, ed., The Cambridge History of Iran, Volume 3: The Seleucid, Parthian and Sasanid Periods (1983), Cambridge University Press, ISBN 978-0521200929.
- Charles Allen Burney, David Marshall Lang. (1971). The peoples of the hills: ancient Ararat and Caucasus. Weidenfeld and Nicolson (original from the University of Michigan).
- Hussey, Joan M., ed. (1966). "The Cambridge Medieval History. Vol. IV, The Byzantine Empire". Cambridge: Cambridge University Press.
- Lenski, Noel (2003). Failure of Empire: Valens and the Roman State in the Fourth Century A.D. University of California Press. ISBN 978-0520928534.
- Pourshariati, Parvaneh (2008). Decline and fall of the Sasanian empire: the Sasanian-Parthian confederacy and the Arab conquest of Iran. I.B. Tauris. p. 44. ISBN 978-1845116453.
- Rapp, Stephen H. (2003). Studies in Medieval Georgian Historiography: Early Texts and Eurasian Contexts. Peeters Publishers. ISBN 978-9042913189.
