= Pharasmanes VI =

6th-century Georgian king

King of Iberia
- Reign: 561-?
- Predecessor: Pharasmanes V
- Successor: Bacurius III
- Issue: Bacurius III
- Dynasty: Chosroid dynasty

P'arsman VI (Georgian: ფარსმან VI, sometimes Latinized as Pharasmanes), of the Chosroid Dynasty, became the king (mepe) of Iberia (Kartli, eastern Georgia) in 561. The length of his reign is unknown. The royal power was largely nominal at that time as the Sassanid Empire dominated Iberia.

He was the fraternal nephew of P’arsman V, his predecessor. P'arsman VI himself was succeeded by his son, Bakur III.

== See also ==
- Sasanian Iberia

Preceded by P’arsman V	King of Iberia; 561–?	Succeeded by Bakur III
