= Mikhail Sabinin =

Russian artist and historian (1845–1900)

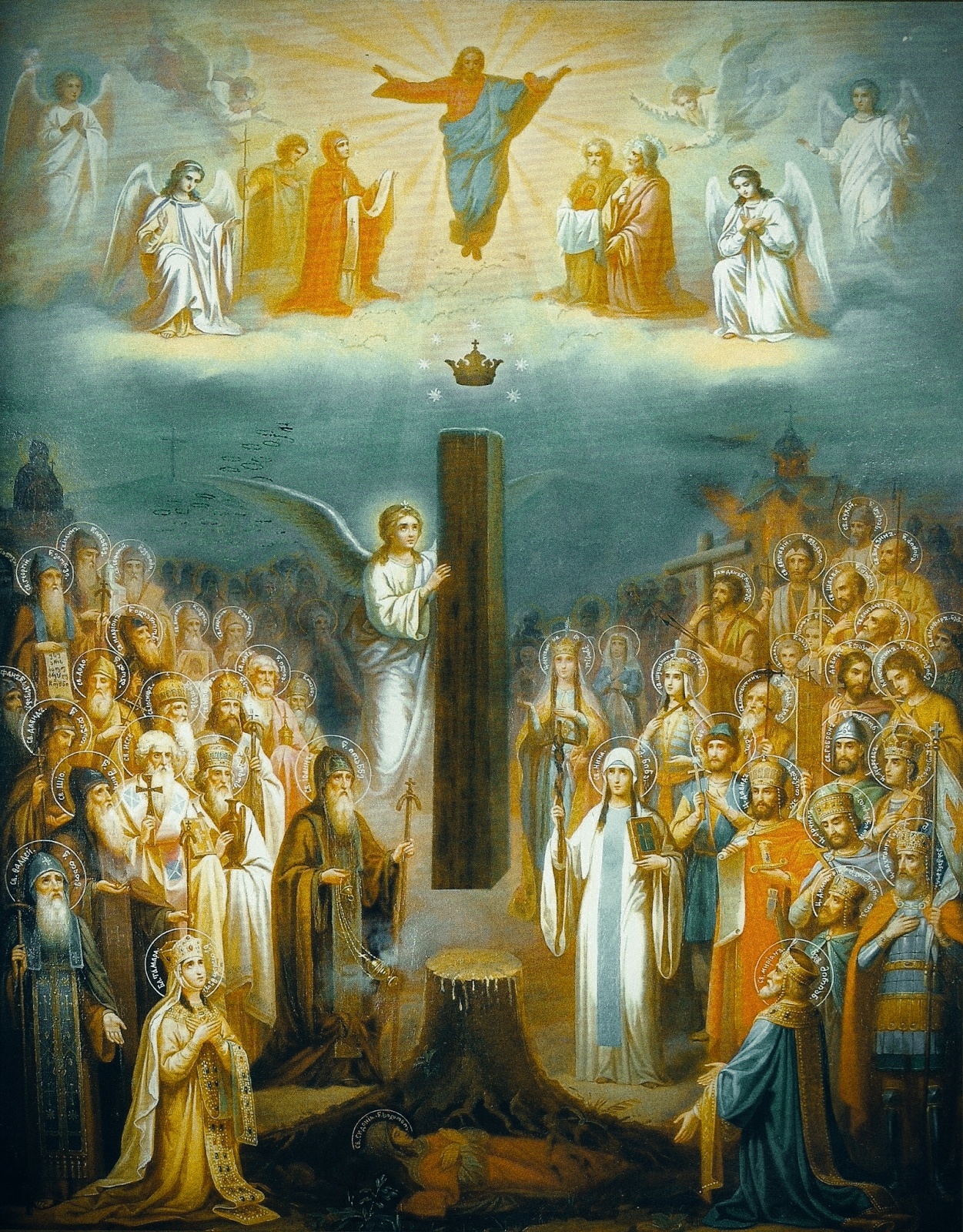
"The Glory of Iveria" by M. Sabinin remains one of the most revered Georgian Orthodox icons to this day.

Mikhail Pavlovich Sabinin (Russian: Михаил Павлович Сабинин, Georgian: მიხეილ პავლეს ძე საბინინი, monk Gobron, Georgian: გობრონ; 1845–1900) was a Russo-Georgian monk, historian of the Georgian Orthodox Church and icon painter.

He was born to the Russian priest from Tver, Pavel Sabinin, whose wife was Georgian. Educated at the Tiflis gymnasium in the 1860s, he then attended St. Petersburg Theologian Academy and attained to a magister degree for his work History of the Georgian Church until the End of the 6th Century ("История грузинской церкви до конца VI в." [СПб., 1877]), the first comprehensive treatment of the subject produced in Russian. He travelled in several regions of Georgia, studying monuments of Christian architecture, copying frescos and icons, recording legends and collecting manuscripts. In St. Petersburg, he was tonsured a monk and given the name Gobron after a 10th-century Georgian saint. In 1882, he published The Paradise of Georgia (საქართველოს სამოთხე; St. Petersburg, 1882), a voluminous lithographed edition of biographies of important Georgian Orthodox Christian saints. In the 1880s, he served at the famous Iviron Monastery on Mount Athos. In 1882 he published also The Passion of Eustathius of Mtskheta. Also in the 1880s he refurbished the chapel housing the relics of St. Nino at the Bodbe Monastery in Georgia.

In 1898, he clashed with the office of the Russian exarchate at Tiflis over his criticism of Russification and was removed from Georgia to Moscow where he died of pneumonia on May 10, 1900.

== See also ==
- List of Russian artists
- Eustathius of Mtskheta
