= Bacurius III =

6th-century Georgian king

King of Iberia
- Reign: ?-580
- Predecessor: Pharasmanes VI
- Successor: Guaram I (de jure) Hormizd IV (de facto)
- Died: 580
- Dynasty: Chosroid dynasty

Bakur III (Georgian: ბაკურ III, Latinized as Bacurius) (died 580) was the last Chosroid king (mepe) of Iberia (natively known as Kartli; ancient Georgia) upon whose death the Iberian monarchy was abolished by Sassanid Iran.

The name Bacurius is the Latin form of the Greek Bakour (Βάκουρ), itself a variant of the Middle Iranian Pakur, derived from Old Iranian bag-puhr ('son of a god'). The name "Bakur" is the Georgian (ბაკურ) and Armenian (Բակուր) attestation of Middle Iranian Pakur.

He succeeded his father, King P'arsman VI, as the king of Iberia. The date of his accession to the throne is unknown but he ruled as contemporary of Hormizd IV of Iran. Bakur's authority was rather limited and hardly extended beyond his fortress at Ujarma while the capital Tbilisi, and Inner Iberia was governed more directly by the Sassanids. When he died in 580, Hormizd IV took opportunity to abolish the kingship in Iberia. He was father of Adarnase I of Iberia.

Preceded by P'arsman VI	King of Iberia ?–580	Succeeded by Kingship abolished
