= Arsacid dynasty of Iberia =

Dynasty in modern Georgia (c. 189–284)

Arsacid არშაკიანი
- Dynasty
- Parent house: Arsacid dynasty of Parthia
- Country: Kingdom of Iberia
- Founded: 189
- Founder: Rev I
- Final ruler: Aspacures I
- Dissolution: 284

The Arsacid dynasty or Arshakiani (Georgian: არშაკიანი, romanized: arshak'iani), a branch of the Arsacid dynasty of Parthia, ruled the ancient Kingdom of Iberia (Kartli, eastern Georgia) from c. 189 until 284 AD. The Arsacid dynasty of Iberia was succeeded by the Chosroid dynasty.

== History ==
Once the Arsacids, in the person of Vologases II (r. 180-191), had consolidated their hold on the Armenian throne by 180, they gained momentum to interfere in Iberia. According to the medieval Georgian chronicles, the king of Armenia, whom Professor Cyril Toumanoff identifies with Vologases II, helped the rebellious nobles of Iberia overthrow his wife’s brother Amazaspus II of Iberia, last of the Pharnabazids, and replace Amazaspus with his son Rev I, whose reign (189-216) inaugurated the Arsacid dynasty in Iberia.

Even as the Arsacids set on the thrones of three Caucasian kingdoms – those of Armenia, Iberia, and Albania – the dynasty was dislodged, in 226, from power in its original homeland and the more powerful and dynamic Sassanid dynasty emerged as new masters of the Iranian Empire. Although the later Georgian chronicles documents this change of power, its account of that period is full of anachronisms and semi-legendary allusions, providing little or no details about the effect of Iranian resurgence on Arsacid Iberia. What we know of that period comes from Classical sources as well as Sassanid inscriptions.

By replacing the weak Parthian realm with a strong, centralized state, the Sassanids changed the political orientation of pro-Roman Iberia and reduced it to a tributary state. Shapur I (r. 242-272) placed a vassal, Amazaspus III (r. 260-265), on the throne of Iberia, possibly a rival or anti-king of Mihrdat II. In 284, with the death of Aspagur I, the Iberian Arsacid line ended, and the Sassanids capitalized on a civil strife in the Roman Empire to establish their candidate, Mirian III, of the Chosroid dynasty, on the throne of Iberia.

== Arsacid kings of Iberia ==
- Rev I, 189–216
- Vache (son), 216–234
- Bacurius I (son), 234–249
- Mithridates II (son), 249–265 (Amazaspus III during 260–265 was his anti-king)
- Aspacures I (son), 265–284
