= Trdat of Iberia =

King of Iberia, an ancient Georgian state

Trdat

King of Iberia
- Reign: 394–406
- Predecessor: Aspacures III
- Successor: Pharasmanes IV
- Dynasty: Chosroid dynasty

Trdat (Georgian: თრდატი, sometimes Latinized as Tiridates), of the Chosroid Dynasty, was the king (mepe) of Iberia (Kartli, eastern Georgia) from c. 394 to 406.

According to the Georgian chronicles, he was a son of Rev II, son of Mirian III, the first Christian king of Iberia and Salome. Trdat's brother was Sauromaces II of Iberia. He is reported to have succeeded, already in an advanced age, his relative and son-in-law, Varaz-Bakur II, and to have been forced to pay tribute to the Sassanids. The chronicles praise his piety and credit Trdat with the construction of churches at Rustavi and Nekresi. The church founded by Trdat at Nekresi is identified by the archaeologist Nodar Bakhtadze with a ruined basilica uncovered in 1998.

Preceded by Varaz-Bakur II	King of Iberia; 394–406	Succeeded by Parsman IV
