= Vezhan Buzmihr =

Vezhan Buzmihr (or Burzmihr, in Georgian sources as Buzmir) was an Iranian nobleman who served as the marzban of Sasanian Iberia. He was headquartered in Tbilisi and was succeeded as marzban by Arvand Gushnasp.

== Sources ==
- Mgaloblishvili, Tamila; Rapp, Stephen H. (2010). "17. Manichaeism in Late Antique Georgia?". Manichaeism In Late Antique Georgia?. Nag Hammadi and Manichaean Studies. Vol. 74. Brill. p. 280. doi:10.1163/ej.9789004189973.i-730.72. ISBN 9789004195790.
- Rapp, Stephen H. (2014). The Sasanian World through Georgian Eyes: Caucasia and the Iranian Commonwealth in Late Antique Georgian Literature. Ashgate Publishing, Ltd. ISBN 978-1472425522.
- Rayfield, Donald (2012). Edge of Empires: A History of Georgia. Reaktion Books. p. 51. ISBN 978-1780230702.
