= Piran Gushnasp =

Piran Gushnasp, also known by his baptized name of Grigor, was an Iranian commander from the House of Mihran. In the early 6th century, he was appointed as the new governor (marzban) of Iberia. Between 540-542 he converted to Christianity, renouncing Zoroastrianism and assuming the Christian name of Grigor. However, this made his family boycott all contact with him, and he was soon executed in 542 at Peroz-Shapur due to apostasy. A companion of Piran, Yazd-panah, was also executed.

== Sources ==
- Pourshariati, Parvaneh (2008). Decline and Fall of the Sasanian Empire: The Sasanian-Parthian Confederacy and the Arab Conquest of Iran. London and New York: I.B. Tauris. ISBN 978-1-84511-645-3.
- Greatrex, Geoffrey; Lieu, Samuel N. C. (2002). The Roman Eastern Frontier and the Persian Wars (Part II, 363–630 AD). New York, New York and London, United Kingdom: Routledge (Taylor & Francis). ISBN 0-415-14687-9.
- Jullien, Christelle (2008). "MARTYRS, CHRISTIAN". Encyclopaedia Iranica.
- Rapp, Stephen H. (2014). The Sasanian World through Georgian Eyes: Caucasia and the Iranian Commonwealth in Late Antique Georgian Literature. Ashgate Publishing, Ltd. p. 183. ISBN 978-1472425522.
- Rayfield, Donald (2012). Edge of Empires: A History of Georgia. Reaktion Books. p. 47. ISBN 978-1780230702.
