= Aspacures I =

King of Iberia (Kartli) from 265 to 284

King of Iberia
- Reign: 265–284
- Predecessor: Mihrdat II
- Successor: Mirian III
- Dynasty: Arsacid dynasty of Iberia

Aspagur I (Georgian: ასფაგურ I, Latinized as Aspacures), of the Arsacid dynasty, was a king (mepe) of Iberia (natively known as Kartli; ancient Georgia) from 265 to 284.

According to the medieval Georgian chronicles, Aspagur was either 23rd or 25th king of Iberia and, together with the Armenians, resisted the Sassanid Iranian expansion into the Caucasus. His reign probably coincided with the temporary reassertion of Roman control of the region under emperors Aurelian and Carus. He is reported to have been defeated by an Iranian invasion and died in exile in Alania. According to the chronicle Life of the Kings, he was last in his line, but his daughter, Abeshura, is claimed to have been married to Mirian III, who would succeed him on the throne and become the first Georgian king to espouse Christianity.

Preceded by Mihrdat II	King of Iberia; 265–284	Succeeded by Mirian III
