= Diarchy =

Form of government with dual co-rule

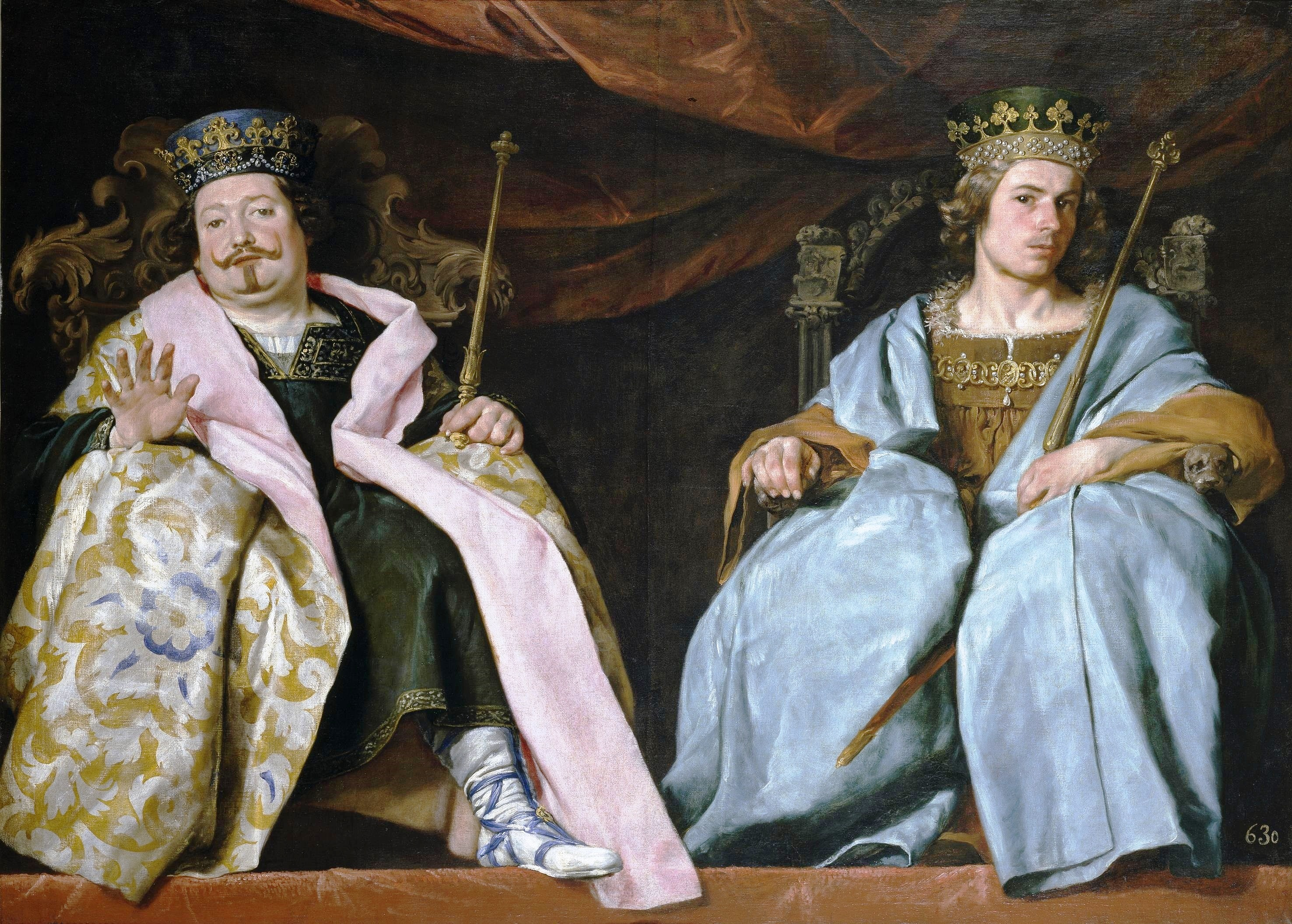
Kings of the Visigoths (c. 1641) by Alonso Cano

Diarchy (from Greek δι-, di-, "double", and -αρχία, -arkhía, "ruled"), (Note: Occasionally spelled dyarchy, as in the Encyclopaedia Britannica article on the colonial British institution) duarchy, or duumvirate (Note: from Latin duumvirātus, "the office of the two men". Occasionally in the mistaken form duovirate.) is a form of government characterized by co-rule, with two people ruling a polity together either lawfully or de facto, by collusion and force. The leaders of such a system are usually known as corulers.

Historically, diarchy particularly referred to the system of shared rule in British India established by the Government of India Acts 1919 and 1935, which devolved some powers to local councils, which had included native Indian representation under the Indian Councils Act 1892. 'Duumvirate' principally referred to the offices of the various duumviri established by the Roman Republic. Both, along with less common synonyms such as biarchy and tandemocracy, (Note: The pun 'tandemocracy' particularly refers to the Putin–Medvedev diarchy, as it is a calque of Russian tandemokratiya (тандемократия).) are now used more generally to refer to any system of joint rule or office. A monarchy temporarily controlled by two or more people is, however, usually distinguished as a coregency.

Corule is one of the oldest forms of government. Historical examples include the Pandyan dynasty of Tamilakam, Sparta's joint kingship, the Roman Republic's consuls, Carthage's Judges, and several ancient Polynesian societies. Systems of inheritance that often led to corule in Germanic and Dacian monarchies may be included as well, as may the dual occupants of the imperial title of the Inca Empire, or its system of succession.

Modern examples of diarchies are Andorra, whose co-princes are the president of France and the Bishop of Urgell in Catalonia; Eswatini that is jointly headed by a male and a female monarch, the Ngwenyama (king) and the Ndlovukati (Queen mother) respectively; Nicaragua, which has been led by two co-presidents (who are also husband and wife) since a constitutional amendment in 2025; and San Marino, which is led by two Captains Regent.

== Formal use ==
=== Current diarchies ===
==== Andorra ====
Andorra is a parliamentary co-principality. Its princes are (ex officio) the French president and the bishop of Urgell in Catalonia, Spain. Since 1962, the French president has been elected by universal suffrage within France. The bishop of the diocese of Urgell is appointed by the Roman Catholic pope.

==== Eswatini ====
The monarchy of Eswatini is traditionally headed by a male and a female monarch, the Ngwenyama (King, lit. 'lion') and the Ndlovukati (lit. 'she-elephant', usually the mother of the reigning Ngwenyama) respectively. In practice, the Ngwenyama effectively holds power as the executive and administrative head of state; the Ndlovukati's role is spiritual and more symbolic but may act as queen regent in the absence of a king. The functions of both the Ngwenyama and Ndlovukati are established in the constitution in accordance with tradition.

==== Nicaragua ====
In 2025, during the presidency of Daniel Ortega, the National Assembly approved multiple amendments to the Constitution of Nicaragua that included replacing the position of president with a diarchy led by Ortega and his wife, hitherto Vice President Rosario Murillo, as co-presidents.

==== Northern Ireland ====
Under the terms of the 1998 Good Friday Agreement intended to end the conflict in Northern Ireland, the first minister and deputy first minister serve as joint heads of the area's executive. Despite the latter office being called a deputy, both positions exercise identical executive powers. However, they are not heads of state.

==== San Marino ====
The captains regent (Italian: Capitani Reggenti) of San Marino are elected every six months by the Sammarinese parliament, the Grand and General Council. They serve as joint heads of state, and are normally chosen from opposing parties.

=== Historical diarchies ===
==== Sparta ====
The office of king in ancient Sparta was divided between two kings from separate dynasties, each holding a veto over the other's actions. However, the Spartan kings' powers and duties consisted mainly of leading the Spartan army on campaign (during which only one king would usually lead a given force) and certain religious functions, as well as having ex-officio seats in the Gerousia (Senate). Actual day-to-day public administration in Sparta was managed by the ephors.

==== Roman Republic ====
Following the overthrow of the Roman monarchy, the Romans established an oligarchic Roman Republic which divided supreme executive power (Latin: imperium) between two consuls, both elected each year and each holding a veto over the other's actions.

The historical duumviri were not rulers but magistrates, performing various judicial, religious, or public functions.

==== Kartli ====
According to the Conversion of Kartli, Leonti Mroveli, Prince Vakhushti of Kartli, Prince Teimuraz of Georgia and Pavle Ingorokva, there existed a dual power in Kartli at the time of the kings mentioned below:

11. Bartom II and Kʽartʽam
12. Pʽarsman I and Kaos
13. Azork and Armazel
14. Amazasp I and Derok
15. Pʽarsman II and Mirdat I

According to Cyril Toumanoff, the diarchs of Kartli in 370-378 were Sauromaces II and Mihrdat III.

==== Hungary ====
The Hungarians originally possessed a system of dual kingship, with religious authority vested in the kende and military authority vested in the war-chief (gyula). It is believed that when the kende Kurszán was killed c. 904 a little after the arrival of the Hungarians in Pannonia, his role was usurped by the war-chief Árpád, establishing the Hungarian monarchy. It is not known with certainty whether Árpád was originally the kende or the gyula.

==== Afghanistan ====
The Ghurid Empire was an established diarchy between Ghiyath al-Din Muhammad and Muhammad of Ghor. The diarchy lasted from 1173 to 1203 until the death of Ghiyath al-Din, leaving his brother, Muhammad sole ruler of the Ghurid empire.

==== Japan ====
During Japan's shogunate, the emperor was notionally a supreme spiritual and temporal lord who delegated authority for joint rule to the shōgun. In practice, the shōguns' power was so complete that they are usually considered de facto monarchs rather than viceroys or corulers.

==== Medieval Europe ====
A paréage was a feudal treaty recognizing the "equal footing" (Latin: pari passu) of two sovereigns over a territory. The most famous such arrangement was the 1278 treaty that established modern Andorra. Others include Maastricht, which was shared by the Duke of Brabant and the Prince-Bishop of Liège. After the establishment of the Dutch Republic, it became a condominium of Liège and the United Provinces, which administered it through the States General of the Netherlands until 1794.

==== Tibet ====
Between 1642 and 1751, political power in Tibet was shared between the 5th, 6th, and 7th Dalai Lamas who headed the realm's Buddhist state religion and various secular rulers known as desis. The growing power of the desis caused the 7th Dalai Lama to abolish the post and replace it with a council known as the Kashag, permitting him to consolidate his authority over the realm. A similar system arose in Bhutan, with the Wangchuck governor (penlop) of Trongsa becoming the Druk Desi and Druk Gyalpo in 1907. In contrast to Tibet, the dynasty eventually consolidated its power and now rules as the kings of Bhutan.

==== Russia ====
From 1619 to 1633, Tsar Michael of Russia ruled alongside his father, Patriarch Filaret of Moscow. Both were addressed as "Великий государь" (velikiy gosudar; "Great Sovereign"), held court together, and when they did not the ceremony was the same. While both were equal in theory, in practice Patriarch Filaret ruled, with Michael supporting whatever his father ordered.

Between the February Revolution in March 1917 and the October Revolution in November, political power in Russia was divided between the Russian Provisional Government and the Petrograd Soviet, a condition described by Vladimir Lenin as "dual power". He elaborated the situation into a dual-power doctrine, whereby communists collaborated with and then supplanted existing bourgeois forms of government.

==== England, Scotland and Ireland ====
Although the Kingdoms of England, Scotland and Ireland were monarchies, they became de facto diarchies in personal union during the co-rule of William II and III and Mary II. After the Glorious Revolution deposed James VII and II, his kingships were succeeded in 1689 by his daughter Mary and his son-in-law and nephew William, who jointly ruled England, Scotland and Ireland until Mary died in 1694, succeeded by William as the sole monarch.

==== Canada ====
The Province of Canada, which existed from 1841 to 1867, was governed by two joint premiers. Usually, one was chosen from the English-speaking Canada West and the other one from the French-speaking Canada East.

==== India ====
Named as the India Secretary for the Lloyd George ministry, Edwin Samuel Montagu made the "Grand Declaration" on 20 August 1917 that British policy would henceforth be "increasing association of Indians in every branch of the administration and the gradual development of self-governing institutions". Montagu and Viscount Chelmsford, the Governor-General of India, then made an extensive tour of the subcontinent in 1917 and 1918. The Montague–Chelmsford Report's recommendations formed the basis for the Government of India Act 1919 that established "diarchy" in British India.

Under that act, the executive was to be headed by a governor appointed by the Secretary of State, who could consult the Governor General. The governor was responsible to the Secretary of State for acts of omission and commission. He was to maintain law and order in the province and ensure that the provincial administration worked smoothly. In respect of transferred subjects, he was to be assisted by his ministers whereas reserved subjects were to be administered by the Governor General and his executive council.

The members of the Executive Council were to be appointed by the Secretary of State and were responsible to him in all matters. There were certain matters that he was to administer at his own discretion, in which he was responsible to the Secretary of State. Each councillor was to remain in office for a period of four years. Their salaries and service conditions were not subject to the vote of provincial legislature. All decisions in the council were to be taken by a majority of votes, the Governor being able to break ties.

==== Western Samoa ====
The 1960 constitution of Western Samoa declared paramount chiefs Malietoa Tanumafili II and Tupua Tamasese Meaʻole as joint heads of state when Western Samoa gained independence in 1962. However, it stipulated that should either of them leave office, the remaining occupant would continue as sole head of state, which occurred in 1963 on Tupua Tamasese's death.

==== Bolivia ====
Following a coup d'état in 1964, former Vice President René Barrientos rose to power as president of the military junta. The following year, faced with discontent from loyalists of General Alfredo Ovando Candía, Barrientos promulgated the co-presidency between himself and Ovando Candía. The pair ruled as dual presidents until 1966 when Barrientos resigned in order to run in that year's general election.

==== Israel ====
During the 2018–2022 Israeli political crisis, Israel's Basic Law: The Government underwent a major change. A system of two prime ministers, appointed at the same time by the Knesset, was established. According to the new method, there was an Alternate Prime Minister of Israel in addition to the standard Prime Minister of Israel. After a half of the government's term, the two prime ministers would change positions as part of a rotation government. During the term, the government's roles and duties were divided between the two prime ministers, each one of them entitled to remove ministers without the other's interference.

However, this system did not survive even until the first planned rotation and was abolished again after the formation of the thirty-seventh government of Israel at the end of 2022.

== Informal use ==
=== Bureaucracy ===
Shared power arrangements within a modern bureaucracy may also be known as a "diarchy" or "duumvirate". Examples include the joint authority of the Chief of the Defence Force and the Secretary of the Department of Defence over the Australian Defence Organisation.

=== Influential outsiders ===
The status of monarchs is sometimes impugned by accusations of corule when an advisor, family member, lover, or friend appears to have taken too great a hand in government. Lü Buwei in Chinese history and François Leclerc du Tremblay in France are famous examples of "éminences grises" who controlled much of their countries' policies. In British history, George VI's reign was mocked as a "split-level matriarchy in pants" owing to the supposed influence of his mother, Queen Mary and his wife Queen Elizabeth.

=== Informally shared power ===
Owing to Confucian notions of filial piety, Chinese and Japanese emperors were sometimes able to 'retire' but continue to exert great influence over state policy. In Indonesia, Sukarno and his vice president Mohammad Hatta were nicknamed the Duumvirate (Dwitunggal), with Sukarno setting government policy and rallying support and Hatta managing day-to-day administration. More recently, the great influence of Vladimir Putin over his successor Dmitry Medvedev was considered a duumvirate, or tandemocracy (see also Medvedev–Putin tandemocracy), until Putin's resumption of the office of president established him as the greater figure.

Within electoral politics, governments, coalitions and parties may sometimes have two fairly equal leaders, as with:

- The temporary First Whitlam Ministry of 5–19 December 1972, composed of Gough Whitlam and Lance Barnard, which was nicknamed the "duumvirate".
- Marama Davidson and James Shaw as joint leaders of the Green Party of Aotearoa New Zealand.

== In fiction ==
- In The Gondoliers by Gilbert and Sullivan, the fictional land of Barataria is ruled jointly for a while by two kings, who happen to be the gondoliers themselves.
- Umbar, in the works of J. R. R. Tolkien, was ruled by a duumvirate. In its earliest years, Gondor was also ruled jointly by two kings, the two sons of Elendil. He himself was king of its sister realm Arnor, and served as high king over both realms.
- The Omaticaya, the Na'vi clan at the center of the film Avatar, are traditionally led by a pair of married tribal chiefs. One of them, the husband, oversees political and military matters while the other one, the wife, is in charge of spiritual and otherwise ceremonial affairs.
- The orbital colony New New York, in the Worlds trilogy by Joe Haldeman, is jointly governed by an elected Policy Coordinator and Engineering Coordinator.
- The Federated Commonwealths of America, in A Different Flesh by Harry Turtledove, is modelled heavily on the Roman Republic, governed by two chief executives styled as Censors (although the offices are more akin to the position of Consul). With each one being able to veto the actions of the other, the election of two politically-opposed Censors was intended as a check on executive power. Censors serve a single non-renewable five-year term and (alongside commonwealth governors) become life-long-serving members of the Senate upon leaving office.
- In Avenue 5, it is suggested that the Office of President of the United States became a duumvirate comprising a human and an artificial intelligence (reminiscent of a virtual assistant).
- In My Little Pony: Friendship is Magic, the nation of Equestria where most of the series takes place is shown to be a diarchy. While the older Princess Celestia is depicted as ruling on her own in the first season of the series, she is later joined by her younger sister Princess Luna as a co-ruler.
- By the end of Legend of Korra, the Northern Water Tribe becomes a diarchy, ruled by the twins Desna and Eska, cousins to the title character.
- The city of Uthodurn, featured in Critical Role, is lorded over by a dual monarchy made up of a dwarven queen and an elven king, referred to as the Diarchy of Uthodurn.

== See also ==
- Monarchy, rule by a single person
- Coregency, temporary rule over a monarchy by two or more people
- Triumvirate, joint rule by three people
- Tetrarchy, joint rule by four people
- Decemviri, joint rule by ten people
