= Pacorus =

Pacorus is a male given name of Middle Iranian origin notably born by Parthians.

People bearing the name include:

Ordered chronologically.

- Pacorus I (died 38 BC), briefly King of Parthia, possibly as co-regent with his father Orodes II
- Pacorus II, King of Parthia (reigned 78–110)
- Pakor I (fl. 1st half of the 1st century), King of Persis
- Pakor II (fl. 1st half of the 1st century), King of Persis
- Pacorus of Media Atropatene, mid-1st century Parthian prince
- Pacorus of the Lazi, 2nd century king of the Lazi appointed by Antoninus Pius
- Pacorus of Armenia, King of Armenia (reigned 161–163)

== See also ==
- Pacores
- Bacurius (disambiguation), Latinized form of the given name
- Pacurius
