= 213 =

213 in various calendars
Gregorian calendar	213; CCXIII
Ab urbe condita	966
Assyrian calendar	4963
Balinese saka calendar	134–135
Bengali calendar	−381 – −380
Berber calendar	1163
Buddhist calendar	757
Burmese calendar	−425
Byzantine calendar	5721–5722
Chinese calendar	壬辰年 (Water Dragon); 2910 or 2703 — to — 癸巳年 (Water Snake); 2911 or 2704
Coptic calendar	−71 – −70
Discordian calendar	1379
Ethiopian calendar	205–206
Hebrew calendar	3973–3974
- Hindu calendars
Vikram Samvat	269–270
Shaka Samvat	134–135
Kali Yuga	3313–3314
Holocene calendar	10213
Iranian calendar	409 BP – 408 BP
Islamic calendar	422 BH – 421 BH
Javanese calendar	90–91
Julian calendar	213; CCXIII
Korean calendar	2546
Minguo calendar	1699 before ROC 民前1699年
Nanakshahi calendar	−1255
Seleucid era	524/525 AG
Thai solar calendar	755–756
Tibetan calendar	阳水龙年 (male Water-Dragon); 339 or −42 or −814 — to — 阴水蛇年 (female Water-Snake); 340 or −41 or −813

Year 213 (CCXIII) was a common year starting on Friday of the Julian calendar. At the time (in Rome), it was known as the Year of the Consulship of Aurelius and Calvinus (or, less frequently, year 966 Ab urbe condita). The denomination 213 for this year has been used since the early medieval period, when the Anno Domini calendar era became the prevalent method in Europe for naming years.

== Events ==
=== By place ===
==== Roman Empire ====
- Emperor Caracalla leaves Rome and expels some Germanic marauders from Gaul, while his mother, Julia Domna, rules the Empire. He defends the northern Rhine frontier against the Alamanni and the Chatti. Caracalla wins over the Germanic tribes on the banks of the River Main, and gives himself the title "Germanicus". It is probably while campaigning in Germania that he takes a liking to the caracalla, a Celtic or Germanic tunic from which he acquires the name by which he is known.

==== China (Han dynasty) ====
- Cao Cao, the prime minister of the Han dynasty, is titled Wei Gong (Duke of Wei) and given a fief of ten cities under his domain. This later becomes the Kingdom of Wei.
- Battle of Ruxu: Cao Cao clashes against Sun Quan.

== Births ==
- Gregory Thaumaturgus, Christian bishop (d. 270)
- Sun Lü, Chinese general and nobleman (d. 232)

== Deaths ==
- Tiberius Claudius Cleobulus, Roman politician
- Wei Kang (or Yuanjiang), Chinese politician
- Zhang Ren, Chinese general under Liu Zhang
- Zhang Song, Chinese official and adviser
