= Arvand Gushnasp =

6th-century Iranian nobleman

Arvand Gushnasp was an Iranian nobleman, who briefly served as the marzban (governor) of Sasanian Iberia from 540 to 541. He was headquartered in Tbilisi, and was succeeded as marzban by Vezhan Buzmihr.

According to the modern historian Stephen H. Rapp Jr, Arvand Gushnasp may well have been a member of the Mihranid clan, thus perhaps being a Parthian prince by origin, although "one who had come from Iran directly".

== Sources ==
- Lang, D. M. (1987). "ARVAND GUŠNASP". In Yarshater, Ehsan (ed.). Encyclopædia Iranica. Vol. II/7:ʿArūż–Aśoka IV. London and New York: Routledge & Kegan Paul. p. 679. ISBN 978-0-71009-107-9.
- Rapp, Stephen H. Jr (2014). The Sasanian World through Georgian Eyes: Caucasia and the Iranian Commonwealth in Late Antique Georgian Literature. Routledge. ISBN 978-1472425522.
