= Pharnavaz =

Pharnavaz (Georgian: ფარნავაზი) is a Georgian masculine given name.

Other forms of name Pharnavaz used in Georgian are: Pharnaoz or Pharna.

It may refer to:

- Pharnavaz I, Georgian king
- Pharnavaz II, Georgian king
- Prince Pharnavaz of Georgia, Georgian royal prince
- Pharnavaz Chikviladze, Georgian judoka
