= Stephen H. Rapp Jr =

American historian

Stephen H. Rapp Jr is an American professor and scholar of history, with a focus and primary research investigating the Roman Empire, ancient Iran, Armenia and Georgia. He is a professor of history at Sam Houston State University.

== Education and career ==
Rapp studied political science at Indiana University Bloomington, graduating in 1990. He went to the University of Michigan for graduate study in history, earning a master's degree in 1992 and completing his Ph.D. in 1997. He joined the Georgia State University faculty as an assistant professor in 1998, and became an associate professor there in 2004. He moved to Sam Houston State University in 2012, and was promoted to full professor in 2015.

== Books ==
Rapp's books include:

- The Sasanian World Through Georgian Eyes: Caucasia and the Iranian Commonwealth in Late Antique Georgian Literature (2014)
- Languages and Cultures of Eastern Christianity: Georgian (edited with Paul Crego, 2012)
- Studies in Medieval Georgian Historiography: Early Texts and Eurasian Contexts (2003)
