= Mepe =

Mode of address to a Georgian monarch

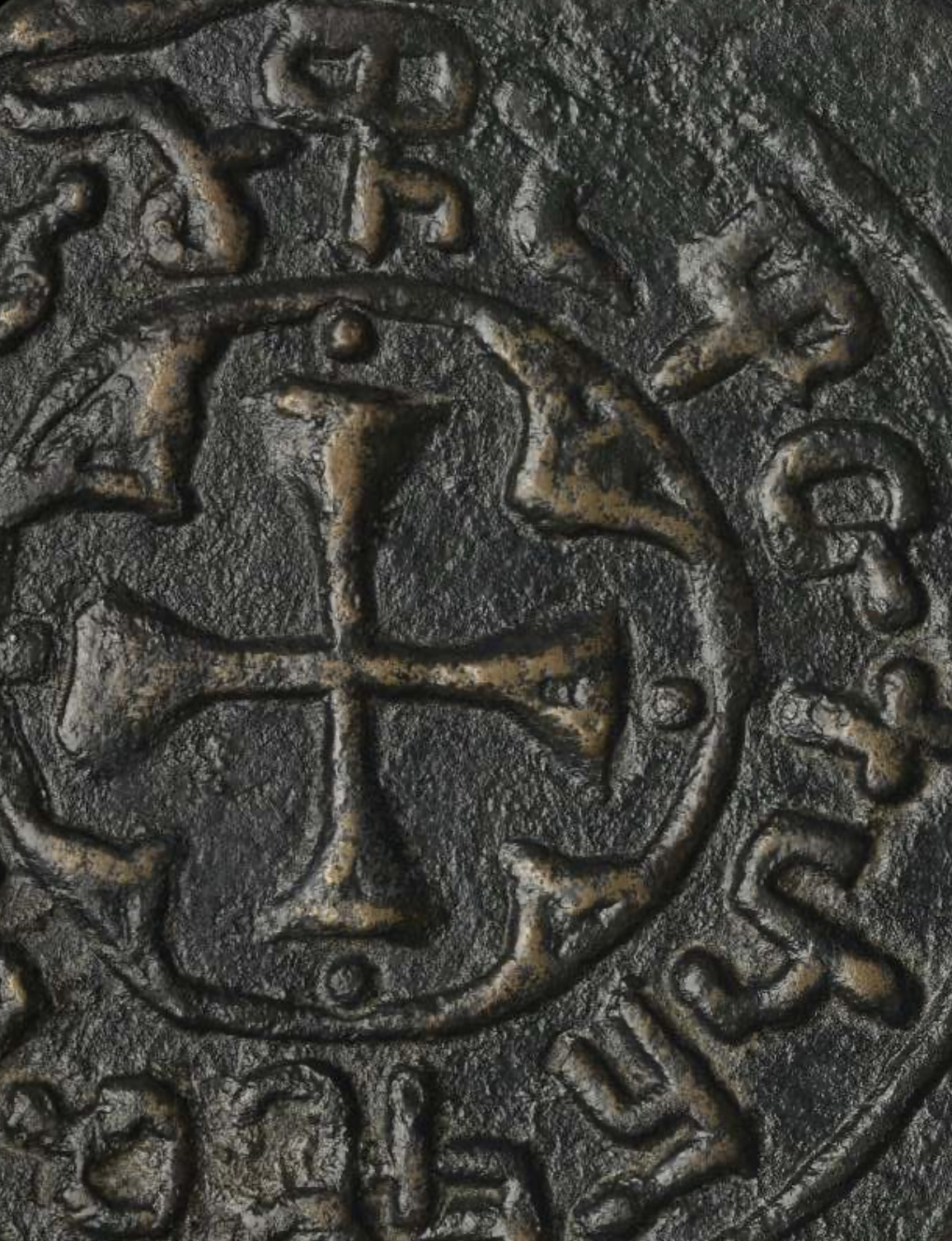
A coin of King David IV with Asomtavruli inscription reading ႫႴႤ (Note: The terms ႫႴ (mp), ႫႴႤ (mpe) and ႫႤႴႤ (mepe) were used simultaneously. Such abbreviations were common in Georgian.)ႠႴႧႵႰႬႩႾႧႱႾႧ (mpe~apt~k~rn~kkht~skht) meaning "King, [of the] Abkhazians, Iberians, Ranis, Kakhetians, Armenians".

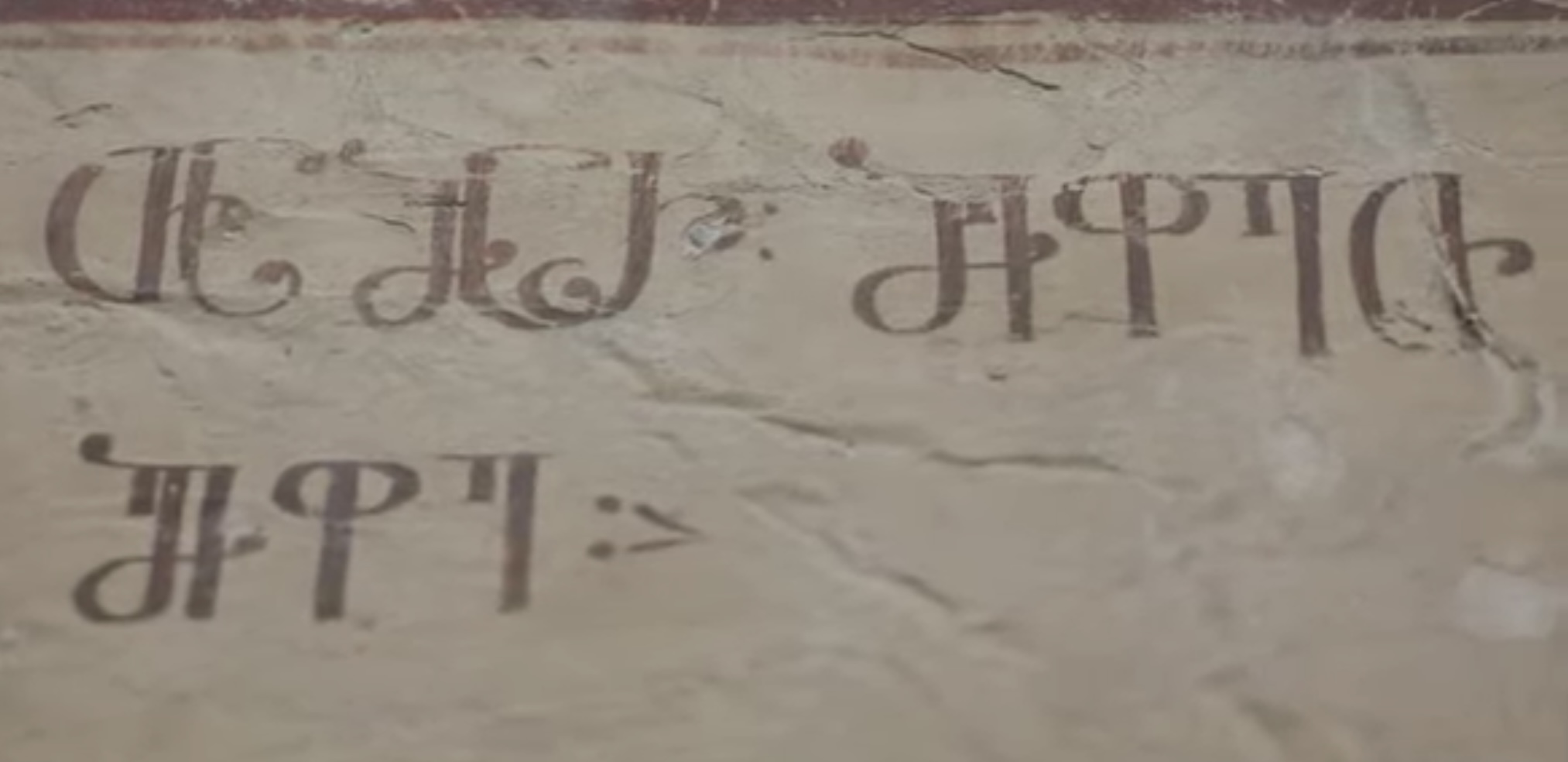
An Asomtavruli fresco inscription of Tamar at Bertubani Church of David Gareji reading ႧႠႫႠႰ ႫႤႴႤႧ ႫႤႴႤ (tamar mepet mepe) meaning "Tamar, King of Kings".

Mepe (Old Georgian: ႫႤႴჁ, romanized: mepē Georgian: მეფე [ˈmepʰe]; meh-PEH) is a royal title used to designate the Georgian monarch, whether it is referring to a king or a queen regnant. The title was originally a male ruling title.

== Etymology ==
The word is derived from Georgian word მეუფე (meupe) which literally means sovereign and lord. Some Georgian dialects have the term as ნეფე (nepe), all derived from common Proto-Kartvelian მფ/მეფე/მაფა (mp/mepe/mapa). Even though mepe has a female equivalent, დედოფალი (dedopali; lit. 'queen') it is only applied to the king's consort and does not have a meaning of a ruling monarch.

== History ==
The term mepe was utilized since pre-Christian beginnings with Azo, but the role would get more structured during the reign of Pharnavaz I in the 3rd century BC. His successors, the Pharnavazid (Note: The Pharnavazids were fascinated by the Persian structure of royal administration, yet cultivated close relations with the Hellenistic Seleucids. The pre-Christian Georgian kings modeled themselves in a same heroic garb as in the Iranian epic cycle and imagery, also incorporating several allusions to the Hebrew Bible and Classical Syriac sources. The pre-Christian Georgian rulers identified Persia as the "land of heroes and giants", an exalted status that was never bestowed upon Rome or Byzantium.) mepes would be titled goliath who would possess the pharnah (lit. 'royal radiance'), the divinely endowed glory believed by ancient Persians to mark only a legitimate ruler, accompanied with დიდებაჲ (didebay; lit. 'greatness') and სუე (sue; lit. 'fortune; destiny'). Georgian monarch's reign was known as მეფობაჲ (mepobay; lit. 'kingship'). Loss of pharnah and sue led to imminent death or overthrow of mepe.

In the late 6th century, the Sasanian Empire would abolish (Note: The Chosroids were dethroned immediately after the death of King Bakur III. Bakur's sons would remain in the mountainous region of Kakheti; their royal pedigree would rule the region as titular princes styled as mtavari.) the kingship of the Kingdom of Iberia, resulting in the interregnum stretching from c. 580 to 888 as a demoted principality. Despite the monarchy was in abeyance, and that royal governing disintegrated, the principality rulers would still continue to claim to be referred to as mepes and ჴელმწიფე (helmts'ipe; lit. 'sovereign'). After 888 (or 889) restoration under next successive dynasty (Note: The Bagratids restored the royal authority soon after they succeeded the Chosroids and seized the Principality of Iberia in 813. They brought rapid expansion and consolidation within Georgian polities. Bagrationi monarchs would base much of their culture modeling and competing intensely with the Byzantine emperors. They frequently claimed saintly status and linked themselves with the divine, eucharistic symbolism, had Davidic lineage pretensions, their royal superiority always depicted haloes and crowns and surrounded by the warrior saints. 12th century icon preserved in the collection of the Saint Catherine's Monastery on Mount Sinai shows King David IV, styled as "pious emperor", standing next to Saint George and receiving the crown from Jesus Christ. The Bagratid kings would expand their authority beyond the confines of Georgia itself, transforming the kingdom into an imperial power. Georgia's imperial "Byzantinization" would result in abandoning its traditional use of the Syro-Palestinian liturgy; in the presence of thousands of Georgian monks throughout Byzantine lands, including Syria, Palestine, Egypt, Cyprus, Anatolia, Bulgaria, on Mount Athos; and the Byzantino-Georgian exchange of diplomatic marriages.) of mepe Adarnase IV, the new kingdom would emerge as the fusion of many lands and territories, that would lead towards a total Georgian unification, culminating in 1008.

In the 12th century, the Bagrationi mepe David IV, who had established himself as the region's superlative political and military force, with his ambitious and sophisticated push for his kingdom's royal imagery promotion, the official style of a king would become imperial თჳთმპყრობელი (tuitmp'q'robeli; lit. 'absolute master' i.e. autokratōr) and მეფეთ[ა]მეფე (mepet[a]mepe; (Note: The first Georgian king to assume the title "mepet[a]mepe" was Gurgen of Iberia, but the term would become absolute and universal during and after David IV. Gurgen's title is elaborated by the Bagratid-commissioned chronicler Sumbat Davitis Dze, explaining Gurgen being a mepe, and a father, of another mepe. Gurgen ruled the Kingdom of the Iberians, while his son, Bagrat, led the Kingdom of the Abkhazians.) lit. 'King of Kings'), similar to the Byzantine βασιλεὺς βασιλέων (basileus basileōn) and Persian: شاهنشاه, romanized: shāhanshāh. David IV's royal projection of his grandiose title was partly aimed at a non-Georgian audience. The title King of Kings was later totally usurped and consistently used by Georgian monarchs, denoting sovereignty over several Persianate subjects such as Shirvanshahs, the Shaddadids and the Eldiguzids.

The royal cult of a monarch would reach its zenith with a female ruler, Tamar, whose execution of power would inaugurate the Georgian Golden Age, her being styled as Tamar, the mepe. Tamar was given the longest and more elaborate titles on the royal charters, listing all the peoples and lands that she ruled as a semi-saint mepetamepe. The Bagrationi mepe, with its royal legitimacy (Note: The Georgian kingship had stubborn and staunch devotion to rules of legitimism and the dynastic succession as a new mepe should have had a biological connection and/or matrimony with an existing family. The Pharnavazids, Chosroids and Bagratids were related through descent, intermarriage and adoption.) and ideological pillar, would rule Georgia for a millennium, from its medieval elevation down to the Russian conquest in the early 19th century.

== See also ==
- Caesar, Roman title
- Basileus, Greek title
- Shah, Persian title
- Tsar, Slavic title

== Bibliography ==
- Rapp, Stephen H. (2014) The Sasanian World through Georgian Eyes: Caucasia and the Iranian Commonwealth in Late Antique Georgian Literature, Ashgate Publishing, ISBN 978-1-4724-2552-2
- Rapp, Stephen H. (2003) Studies In Medieval Georgian Historiography: Early Texts And Eurasian Contexts; Peeters Bvba ISBN 90-429-1318-5
- Eastmond, A. (2017) Eastern Approaches to Byzantium: Papers from the Thirty-Third Spring Symposium of Byzantine Studies, University of Warwick, Routledge, ISBN 978-1-351-94213-3
- Eastmond, A. (1998) Royal imagery in medieval Georgia, Pennsylvania State University, ISBN 978-0-271-01628-3
- Rayfield, D. (2013) Edge of Empires: A History of Georgia, Reaktion Books, ISBN 9781780230702
- Bakhtadze, M. (2015) Georgian titulature of Tao-Klarjeti ruling Bagrationi dynasty, Ivane Javakhishvili Tbilisi State University, Institute of Georgian History Proceedings, IX, Tbilisi, Publishing Meridiani
- Klimov, G. (1998) Etymological Dictionary of the Kartvelian Languages; Walter de Gruyter GmbH; ISBN 978-3-11-015658-4
