= December 11 (Eastern Orthodox liturgics) =

Day in the Eastern Orthodox liturgical calendar

Eastern Orthodox liturgical calendar
December 10	December 11	December 12
December 11 O.S. ≍ December 24 N.S. December 11 N.S ≍ November 28 O.S.

An Eastern Orthodox cross

December 11 in Eastern Orthodox liturgical calendars is a feast day and a day of commemoration of saints and martyrs. Although some Orthodox churches use the Revised Julian Calendar and others use the traditional Julian calendar, the fixed commemorations for their respective December 11 are broadly the same, no matter which calendar is used. (Note: Despite the dates being the same, the days to which they refer typically differ by 13 days. The notation Old Style or O.S. is sometimes used to indicate a date in the traditional Julian Calendar (the "Old Calendar"). The notation New Style or N.S. indicates a date in the Revised Julian calendar (the "New Calendar").)

== Saints ==
- Martyrs Terence (Terentius), Vincent, Emilian, and Bebaia, by the sword.
- Martyrs Peter the Ascetic, and Acepsimas, in Persia (Note: Their memory is recorded in the Synaxarion of Hippolyte Delehaye, and in Parisian Codex 1578.)
- Monk-martyr Barsabas, Abbot of Ishtar, and ten companions, in Persia (342)
- Martyrs Aeithalas and Acepsius at Arbela in Assyria (354)
- Venerable Daniel the Stylite of Constantinople (490)
- Martyr Mirax of Egypt (c. 640)
- Saint Nikephoros II Phokas, Emperor of the Romans (969) (Note: His memory is recorded only in the Lavreotic Codex B 4f. 133, where there is also a complete Acolouthia (service) with Canons. They were published by Louis Petit in Byzantinische Zeitschrift Vol. XIII (1904) pp. 398–420 (see: Office inédit en l’honneur de Nicéphore Phocas); and by Dimitrievski in Kiev in 1911.)
- Saint Luke the New Stylite of Chalcedon (979)

== Pre-Schism Western saints ==
- Martyrs Victoricus, Fuscian, and Gentian (c. 287) (Note: Victoricus and Fuscian are described as early missionaries in France, martyred near Amiens. Gentian was an old man martyred while trying to protect them when they were arrested.)
- Martyrs Thrason, Pontian and Praetextatus, in Rome under Diocletian, for ministering to Christian prisoners awaiting martyrdom (302)
- Saint Eutychius, a martyr called San Oye either in Mérida or else in Cádiz in Spain (4th century)
- Saint Sabinus of Piacenza, Bishop of Piacenza in Italy and a close friend of Saint Ambrose, renowned for miracles (420)
- Saint Cían, hermit in Wales (6th century)
- Saint Peris, the patron saint of Llanberis in Wales (c. 6th century)
- Saint Fidweten (Fivetein, Fidivitanus), a monk and disciple of Saint Convoyon at Redon Abbey in Brittany (c. 888)

== Post-Schism Orthodox saints ==
- Venerable Nikon (Nicon) the Dry of the Kiev Near Caves (1101)
- Venerable Leontius, Monk of Monemvasia and Achaia (1452)
- Venerable Damaskinos.
- Venerable Nomon the Wonderworker of Cyprus.
- Saint Kuksha Velichko, Hieroschemamonk of Odessa (1964)

=== New martyrs and confessors ===
- New Hieromartyr Theophanes Ilminsky, Bishop of Perm and Solikamsk, (Note: See: (in Russian) Феофан (Ильменский). Википедии. (Russian Wikipedia).) and with him two priests and five laymen, martyrs (1918)
- New Hieromartyr Nicholas Vinogradov, Priest (1937) (Note: See: (in Russian) Виноградов, Николай Михайлович (священномученик). Википедии. (Russian Wikipedia).)
- New Hieromartyr John Bogoyavlensky, Priest (1941)

== Other commemorations ==
- Sunday of the Holy Forefathers of Jesus Christ (December 11–17)
- Synaxis of All Saints of Georgia

== Icon gallery ==
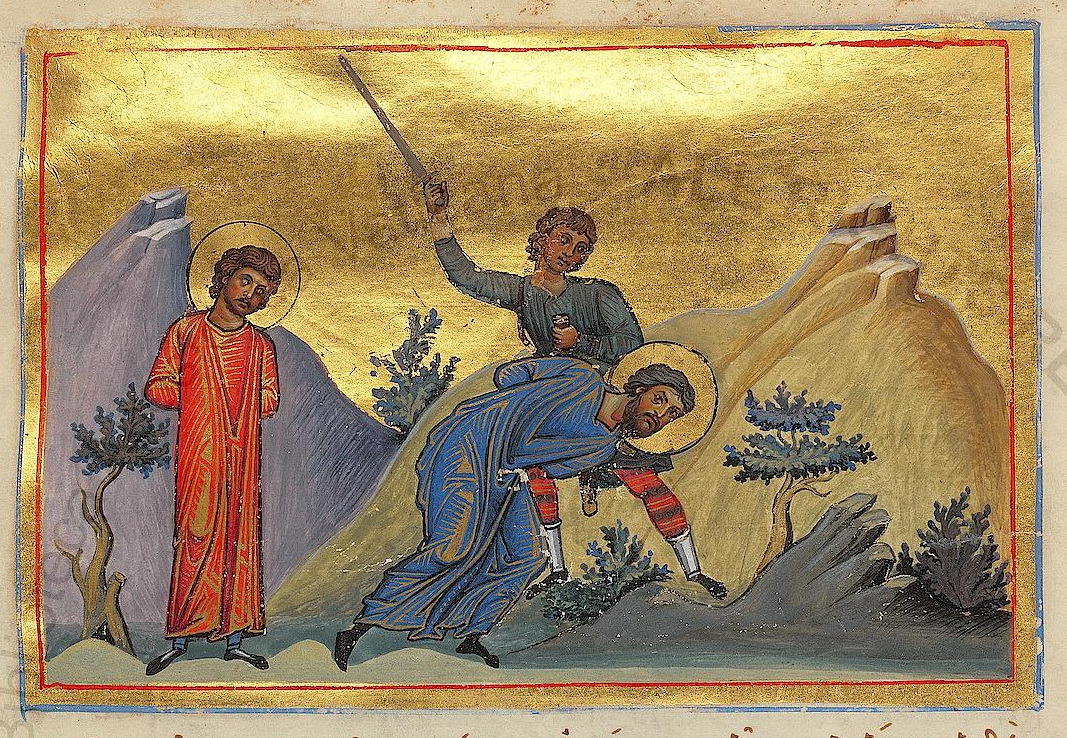
Martyrs Aeithalas and Acepsius.
(Menologion of Basil II, 10th century).

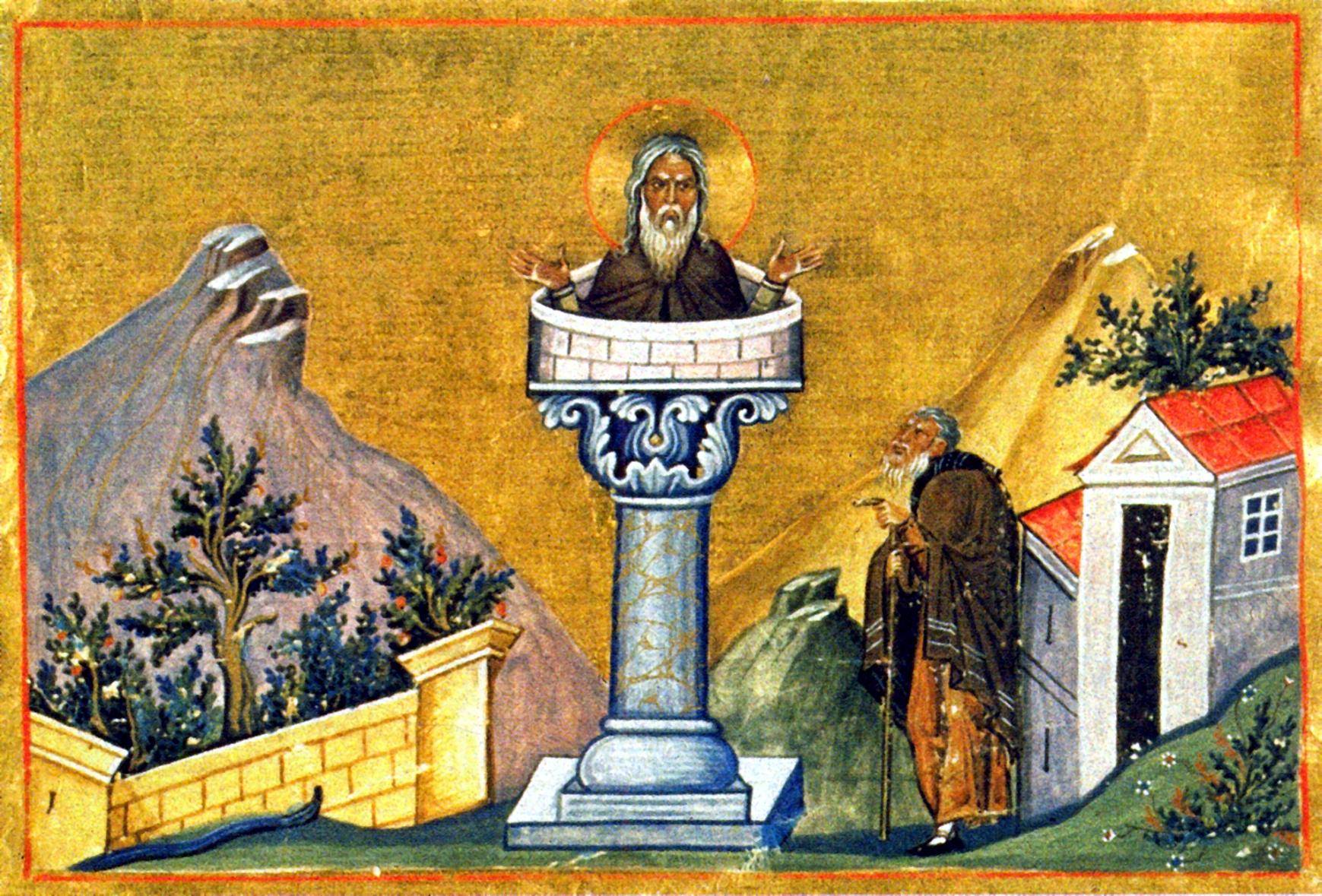
St. Daniel the Stylite.
(Menologion of Basil II, 10th century).

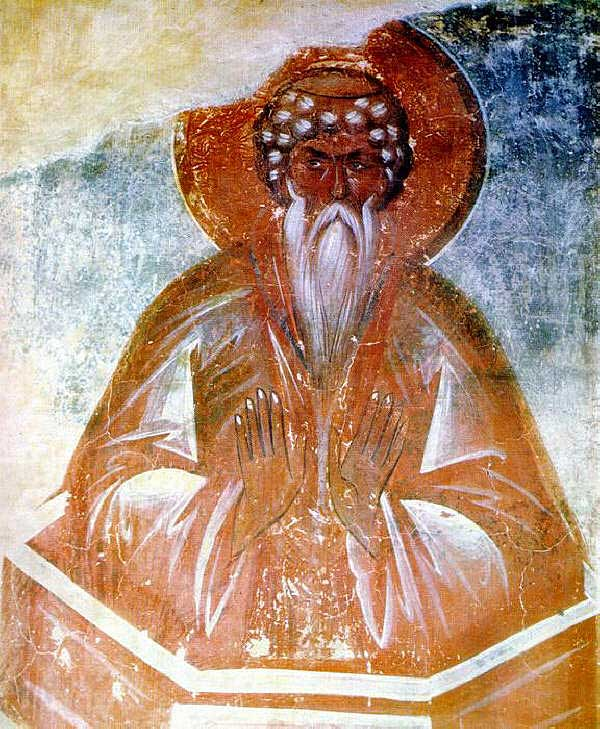
St. Daniel the Stylite. (Church of the Transfiguration, Veliky Novgorod, 1378).

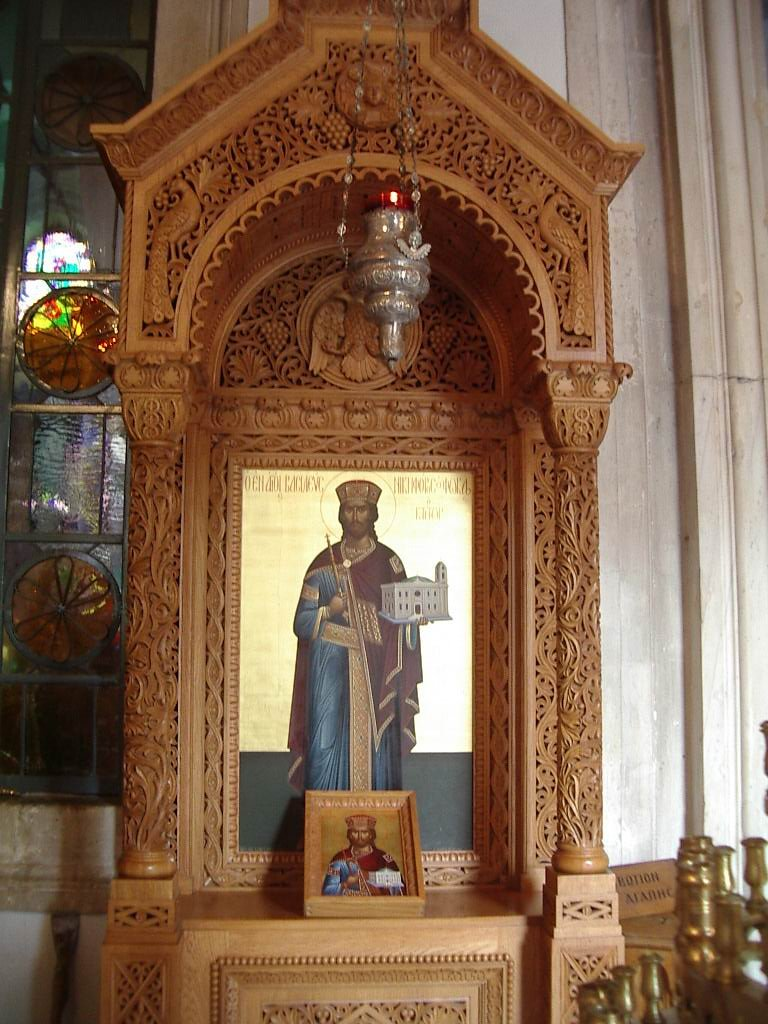
St. Nikephoros II Phokas.

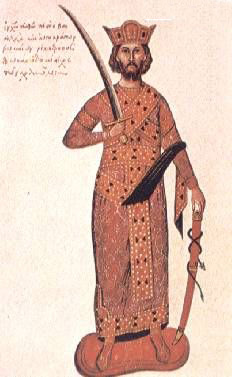
Medieval illumination representing Nikephoros II Phokas.

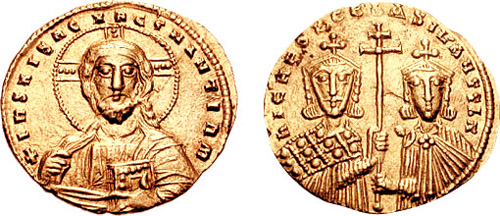
At right, Nikephoros II Phokas and his stepson Basil II.

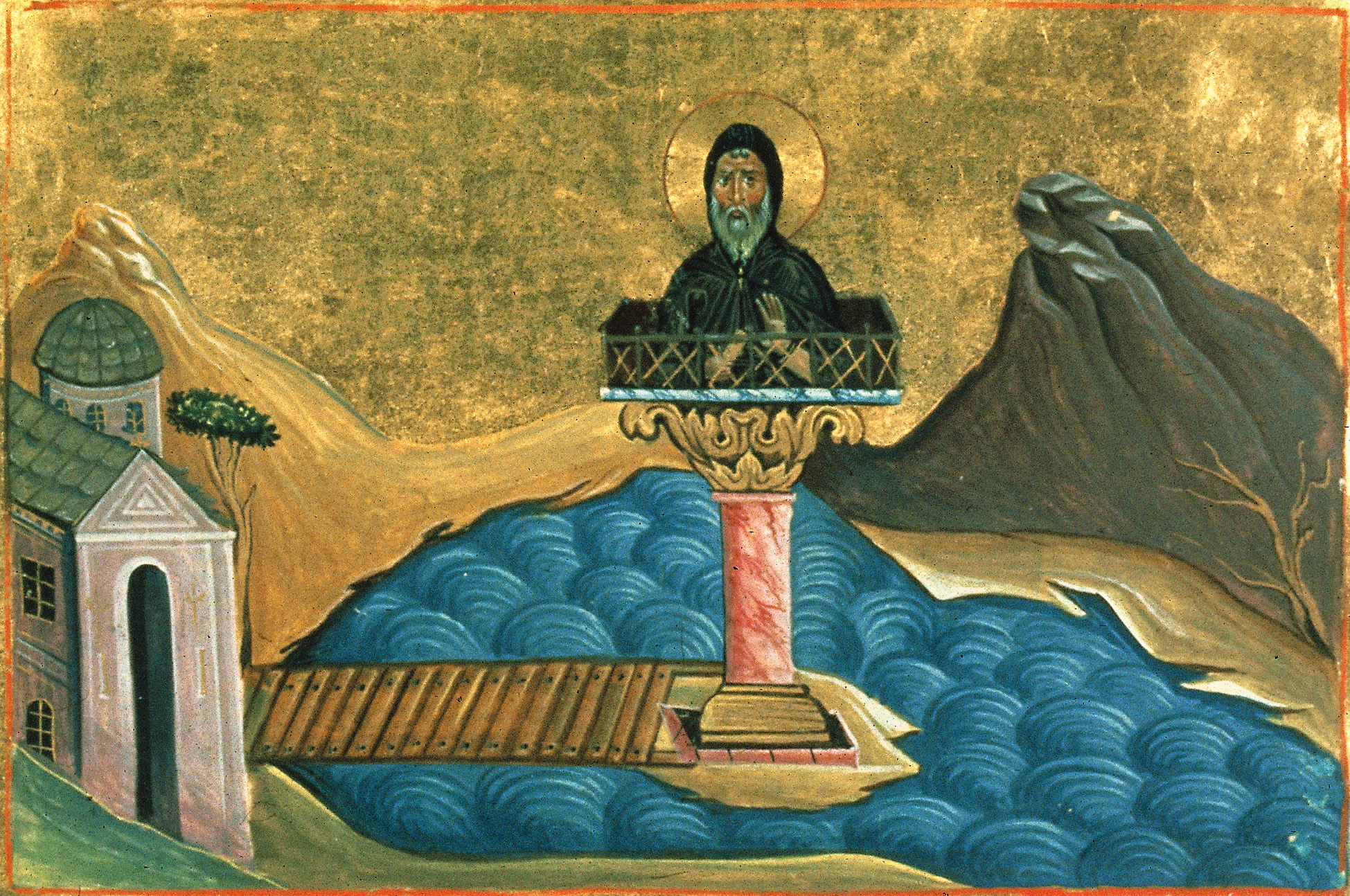
Saint Luke the New Stylite, of Chalcedon.
(Menologion of Basil II, 10th century).

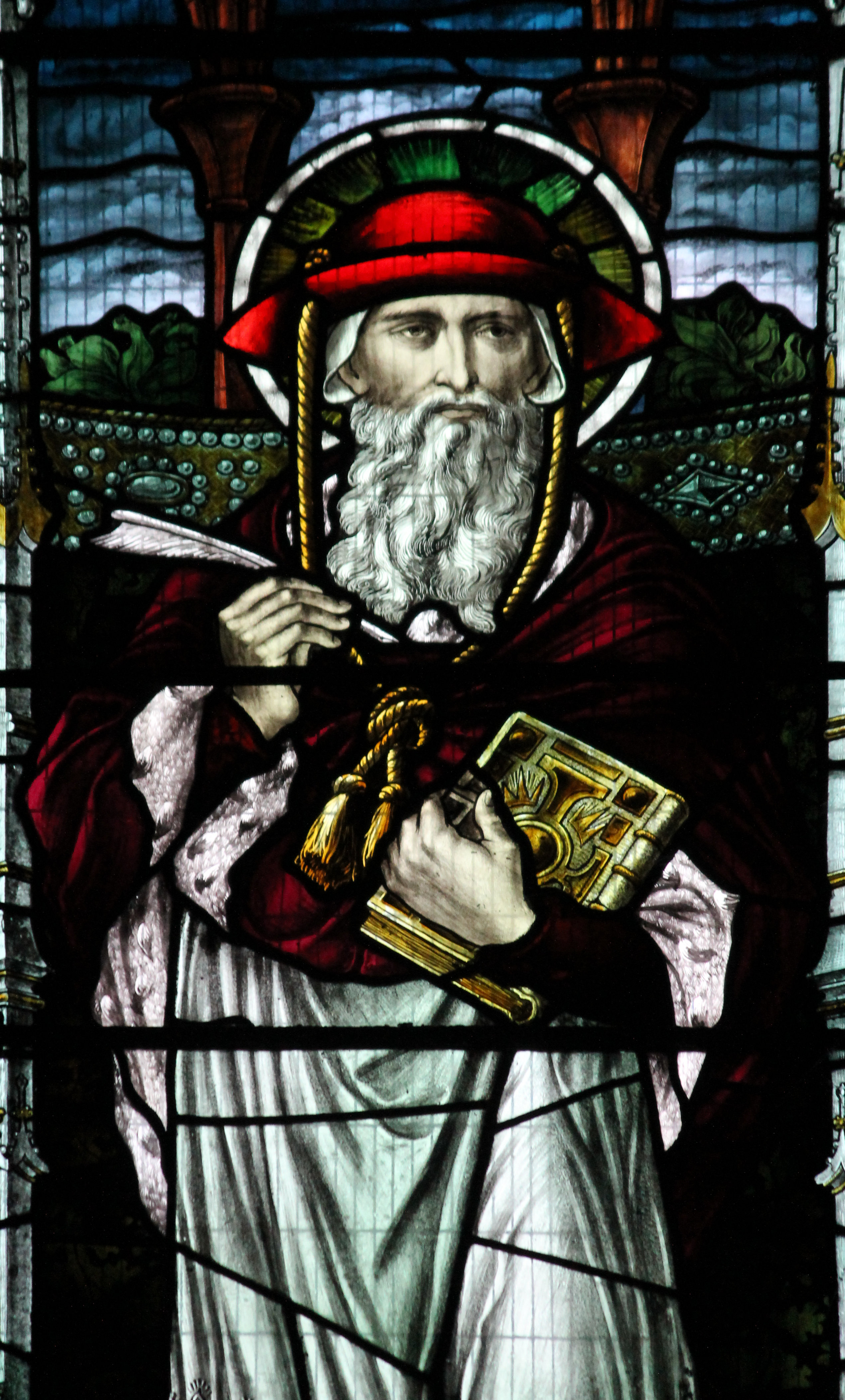
St. Peris, the patron saint of Llanberis in Wales.

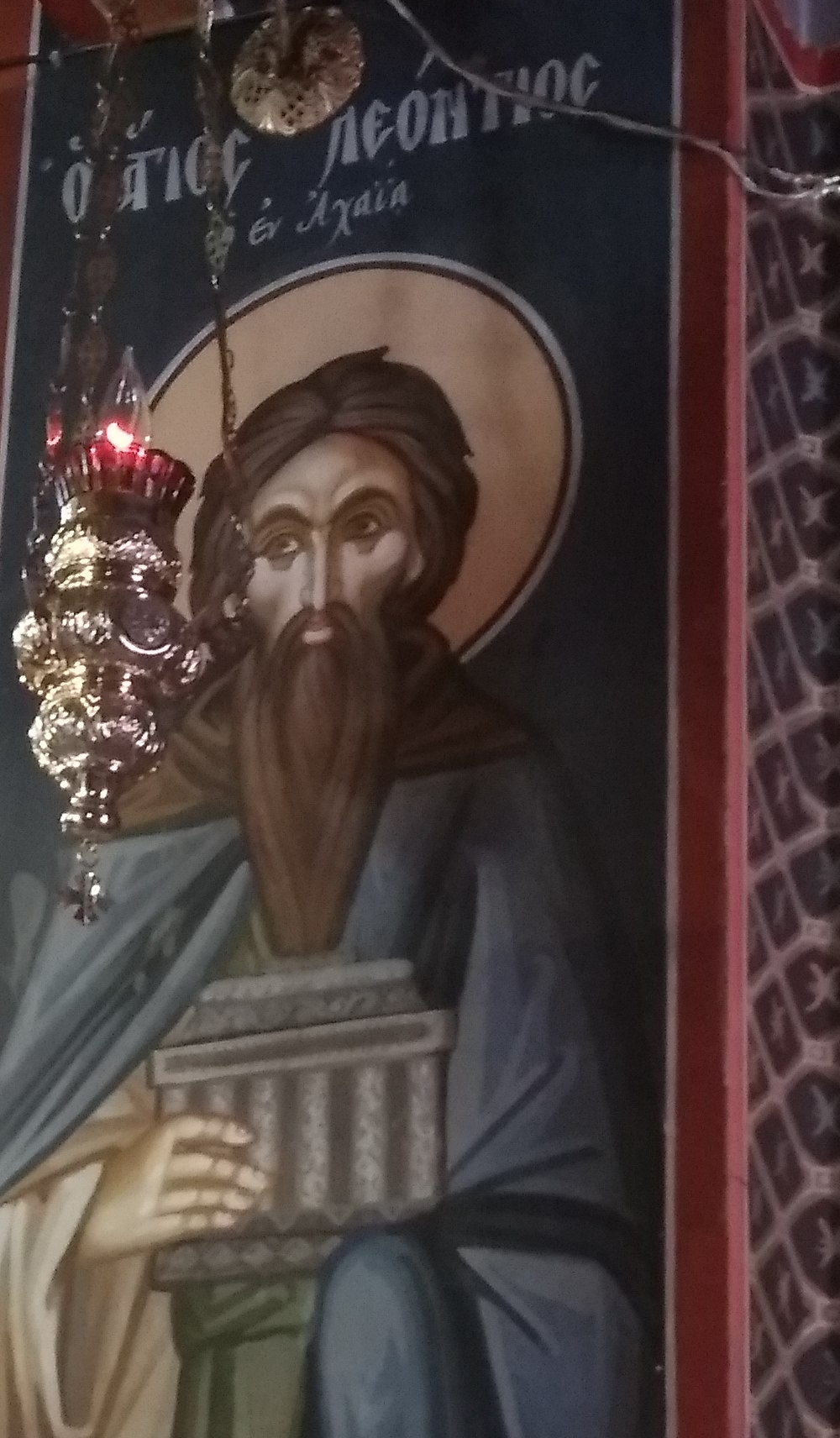
Venerable Leontius of Monemvasia.

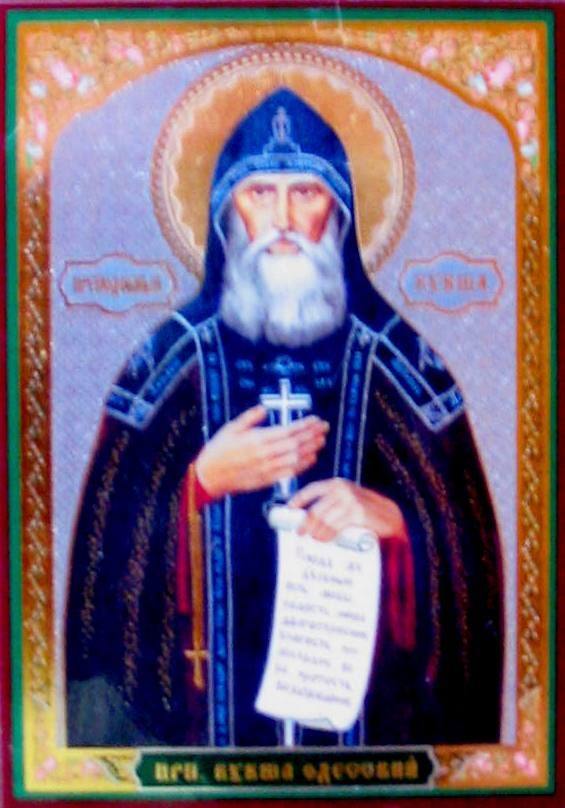
St. Kuksha of Odessa.

New Hieromartyr Theophanes Ilminsky, Bishop of Perm and Solikamsk.

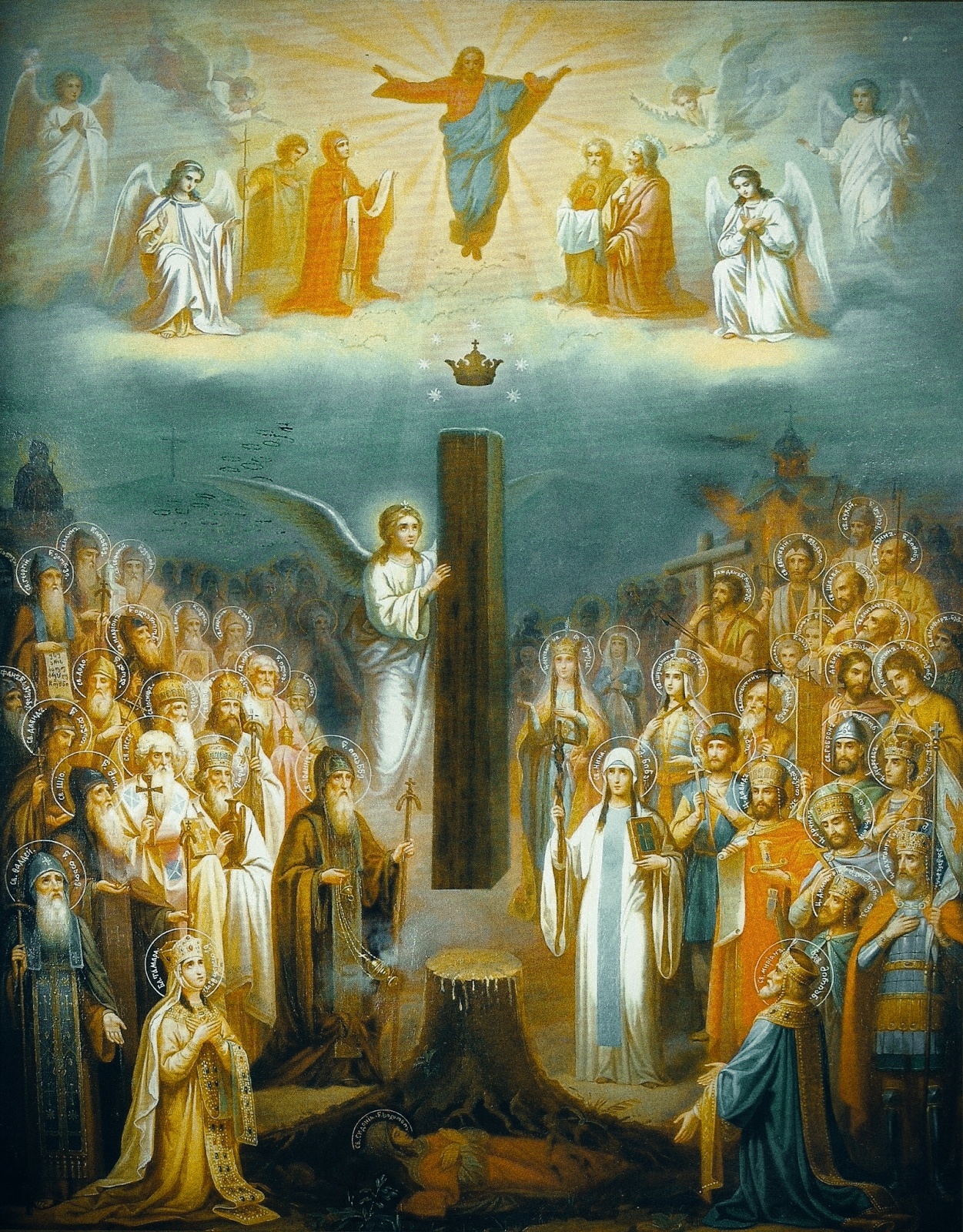
Synaxis of All Saints of Georgia
("The Glory of Iveria" icon, by M. Sabinin).

== Sources ==
- December 11/24. Orthodox Calendar (PRAVOSLAVIE.RU).
- December 24 / December 11. HOLY TRINITY RUSSIAN ORTHODOX CHURCH (A parish of the Patriarchate of Moscow).
- December 11. OCA - The Lives of the Saints.
- The Autonomous Orthodox Metropolia of Western Europe and the Americas (ROCOR). St. Hilarion Calendar of Saints for the year of our Lord 2004. St. Hilarion Press (Austin, TX). p. 92.
- December 11. Latin Saints of the Orthodox Patriarchate of Rome.
- The Roman Martyrology. Transl. by the Archbishop of Baltimore. Last Edition, According to the Copy Printed at Rome in 1914. Revised Edition, with the Imprimatur of His Eminence Cardinal Gibbons. Baltimore: John Murphy Company, 1916.

Greek Sources

- Great Synaxaristes: (in Greek) 11 ΔΕΚΕΜΒΡΙΟΥ. ΜΕΓΑΣ ΣΥΝΑΞΑΡΙΣΤΗΣ.
- (in Greek) Συναξαριστής. 11 Δεκεμβρίου. ECCLESIA.GR. (H ΕΚΚΛΗΣΙΑ ΤΗΣ ΕΛΛΑΔΟΣ).

Russian Sources

- (in Russian) 24 декабря (11 декабря). Православная Энциклопедия под редакцией Патриарха Московского и всея Руси Кирилла (электронная версия). (Orthodox Encyclopedia - Pravenc.ru).
- (in Russian) 11 декабря (ст.ст.) 24 декабря 2014 (нов. ст.). Русская Православная Церковь Отдел внешних церковных связей. (DECR).
