= December 24 (Eastern Orthodox liturgics) =

Day in the Eastern Orthodox liturgical calendar

Eastern Orthodox liturgical calendar
December 23	December 24	December 25
December 24 O.S. ≍ January 6 N.S. December 24 N.S ≍ December 11 O.S.

An Eastern Orthodox cross

December 24 in Eastern Orthodox liturgical calendars is a feast day and a day of commemoration of saints and martyrs. Although some Orthodox churches use the Revised Julian Calendar and others use the traditional Julian calendar, the fixed commemorations for their respective December 24 are broadly the same, no matter which calendar is used. (Note: Despite the dates being the same, the days to which they refer typically differ by 13 days. The notation Old Style or O.S. is sometimes used to indicate a date in the traditional Julian Calendar (the "Old Calendar"). The notation New Style or N.S. indicates a date in the Revised Julian calendar (the "New Calendar").)

== Feasts ==
- The Eve of the Nativity of Christ (Note: In Slavic practice, on the Eve of the Nativity of the Lord, the liturgical services consist of the Royal Hours with the Typika, Vespers, and the Divine Liturgy of Saint Basil the Great. At Vigil in the evening, Great Compline is followed by Matins.)

== Saints ==
- Venerable Nun-Martyr Eugenia of Rome, and with her:
  - Martyrs Philip her father, Protus, Hyacinth (Jacinth), Basilla, and Claudia (262)
- Martyrs Sossios and Theokleios (c. 286–305) (Note: They are not recorded in the Synaxarion of St. Nicodemus, however their memory is preserved in Parisian Codex 1621, with a few biographical details. They were martyred under Maximian and Magnentius (286–305). As Christians they were arrested by the ruler Baudus (who was hegemon of Adrianople in Macedonia), and because they were not persuaded to deny Christ, they were mercilessly tortured in the most horrible way. Eventually they were beheaded and thus took the imperishable crown of martyrdom.)
- Martyr Castulus (c. 307–323) (Note: He is not recorded in the Synaxarion of St. Nicodemus, however his memory is preserved in Parisian Codex 1621, with the following biographical summary: This saint was martyred during the reign of Licinius (307–323), to whom he was denounced as a Christian. After being arrested, they hanged him and flayed his skin. Then they handed him over to the ruler Zilikinthius, and because he also failed to this convince the Martyr to denounce Christ, they tortured him severely and in the end decapitated him.)
- Martyr Achaicus (Achaikos), by the sword
- Venerable Betimius (Bitimionus, Vitimionus) of Scetis (Scete) (5th century)
- Venerable Aphrodisius, Monk of Palestine (6th century)
- Venerable Antiochus (Antiochus Strategos, Antiochos Sabbaitis), Monk of the Great Lavra of St. Sabbas the Sanctified in Jerusalem, Palestine (635) (Note: Saint Nicodemus of the Holy Mountain hypothesized that this Saint is the one who was the known as "Pandektos" (i.e. that is, the author of the Pandects of Holy Scripture), who lived in the middle of the 7th century and descended from the Galatia, and was a monk in the Great Lavra of St. Sabbas the Sanctified in Jerusalem. In addition, Antiochos wrote about the Conquest of Jerusalem in 614, and lamented the murder of the monks of the Lavra of St. Sabbas by the invaders. A good study dealing with Antiochus was written by Archimandrite Kallistos (1910), and another by Ioannes Fokilides, in his work "The Holy Lavra of Savva the Sanctified" (1927). See also: Professor F.C. Conybeare. Antiochus Strategos, The Capture of Jerusalem by the Persians in 614 AD. English Historical Review 25 (1910). pp. 502–517.)
- Venerable Nicholas the Monk of Bulgaria (Nicholas the former soldier) (c. 802–811)

== Pre-Schism Western saints ==
- Martyrs Lucian, Metrobius, Paul, Zenobius, Theotimus and Drusus, in Tripoli in North Africa
- Hieromartyr Gregory of Spoleto, a priest martyred in Spoleto in Italy under Maximinian Herculeus (Note: "At Spoleto, the holy priest Gregory. In the time of the emperors Diocletian and Maximian, he was first beaten with rough clubs, and then after being exposed on the gridiron and imprisoned, was struck on the knees with iron carding instruments, burned on the sides with firebrands, and finally beheaded.")
- Saint Delphinus, Bishop of Bordeaux in France; he helped convert Saint Paulinus of Nola and was an untiring opponent of Priscillianism (404) (Note: "At Bordeaux, St. Delphinus, a bishop, who was renowned for holiness, in the time of Theodosius.")
- Saint Venerandus, born of a senatorial family in Clermont in Auvergne in France, he became bishop there from 385–423 (423)
- Saint Caranus (Carannus), a saint of the east of Scotland
- Saint Tarsila, an aunt of Saint Gregory the Great, sister of Saint Emiliana and niece of Pope Felix III; she led a life of seclusion and asceticism in her paternal home (581)
- Saint Mochua, Abbot of Timahoe (637)
- Saint Irmina, sister of Saint Adela, daughter of Dagobert II (King of the Franks) (708) (Note: Given in marriage at the age of fifteen. Her betrothed died on her wedding day. She then persuaded her father, Dagobert II, to build for her the convent of Oehren near Trier in Germany. She also built the monastery of Echternach for St. Willibrord (698). She reposed at the monastery of Weissenburg.)
- Saint Adela, daughter of Dagobert II (King of the Franks), first Abbess of Pfalzel near Trier in Germany (c. 730)
- Saint Alberic (Albert), Monk at Gladbach Abbey in Germany (10th century)
- Saint Bruno, a holy man at the monastery of Ottobeuren Abbey in Bavaria in Germany (1050)

== Post-Schism Orthodox saints ==
- Venerable Agapios the New of Dimitsana (1812) (Note: Agapios the Younger, in the world Antonios Antonopoulos, also known as Antonios Papantopoulos (Dimitsana, 1753 to 1812). He studied at the school of his native town Dimitsana, where his teachers were Agapios Leonardo and Gerasimos Gounas. When the school was closed during the Orlov Revolt, Agapios followed Gerasimos Gounas to Smyrna, where he continued his studies at the prestigious school of the city, under the scholar Ierotheos Dendrinos. In Smyrna he was tonsured a monk. Later he followed Gerasimos Gounas to Chios, and finally returned to his hometown Dimitsana, where in August 1781 he became the director of his old school. The famous School of Dimitsana owes its reputation primarily to Agapios the Younger, who for 32 years performed his duties as director of the school with unique diligence, hard work and honesty. Another characteristic of Agapios, was the simplicity and austerity of his life. We do not have any of his writings, however his influence as an instructor was the root from which many excellent teachers and clergy of the period came forth.)

=== New martyrs and confessors ===
- New Martyr Achmed (Ahmet) the Calligrapher, at Constantinople (1682) (see also May 3)
- Venerable New Hieromartyr Innocent Beda, Archimandrite of Voronezh (Innokenty Bida of Poltava) (1927–1928)
- New Hieromartyr Theophan Beatovich, Hieromonk of Kosjerev Monastery, Montenegro (1941)
- New Hieromartyr Sergius Mechev, Archpriest of Moscow (1941–1942)

== Icon gallery ==
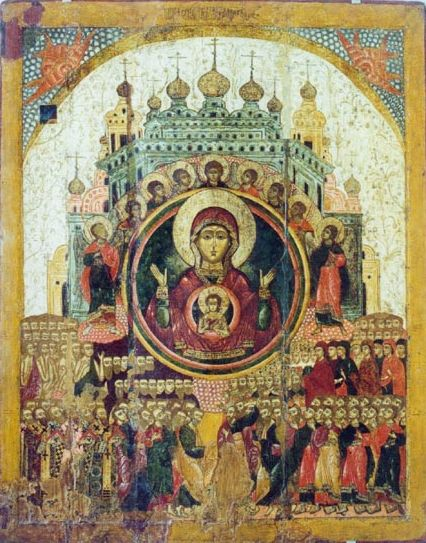
Russian Icon "All of Creation Rejoices in Thee".
(17th century) (Note: The hymn "In Thee rejoiceth ..." is a Troparion of St. John Damascene, in honor of Our Lady, the text of which is included in Oktoechos. In Orthodox worship it is used in the Liturgy of St. Basil the Great, which is served on Christmas Eve: "O Full of Grace, all creation rejoiceth in thee! The angelic hosts sing thy praises with all mankind: thou hallowed temple, noetical paradise, and the glory of all virgins. Of thee was God made flesh - our God before all ages - and became a child. Of thy body a throne He made; He made thy womb more spacious than the heavens. All creation rejoiceth in thee, O Full of Grace: glory be to Thee!")

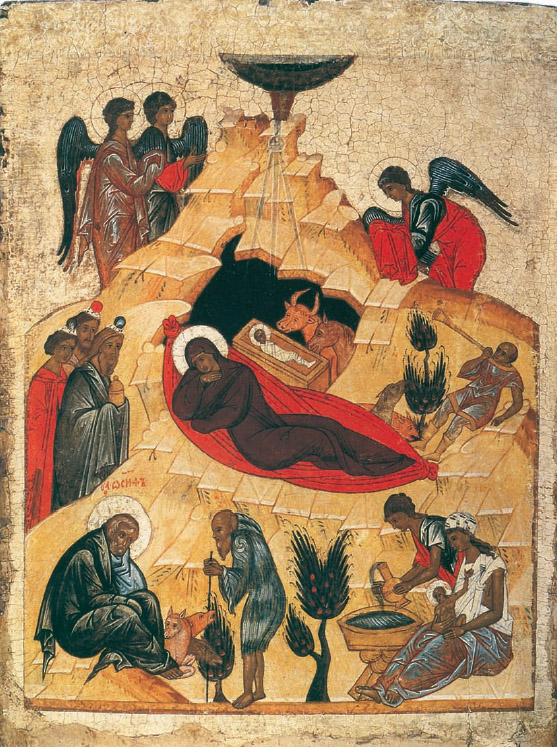
The Nativity (c. 1475).

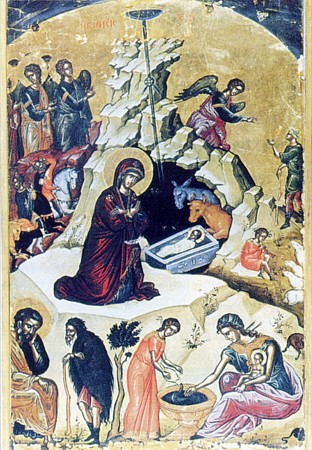
The Nativity (16th century)

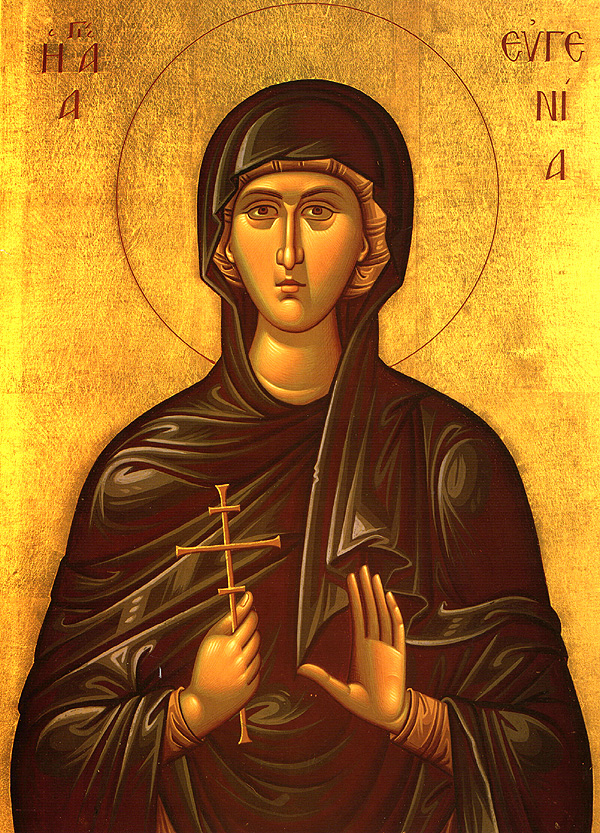
St. Eugenia of Rome.

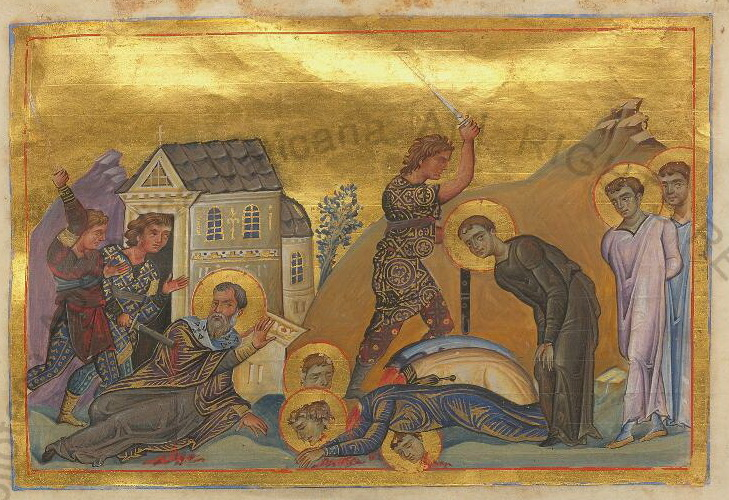
Martyrdom of St. Eugenia of Rome and others.
(Menologion of Basil II, 10th century).

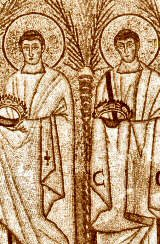
Saints Protus and Hyacinth.

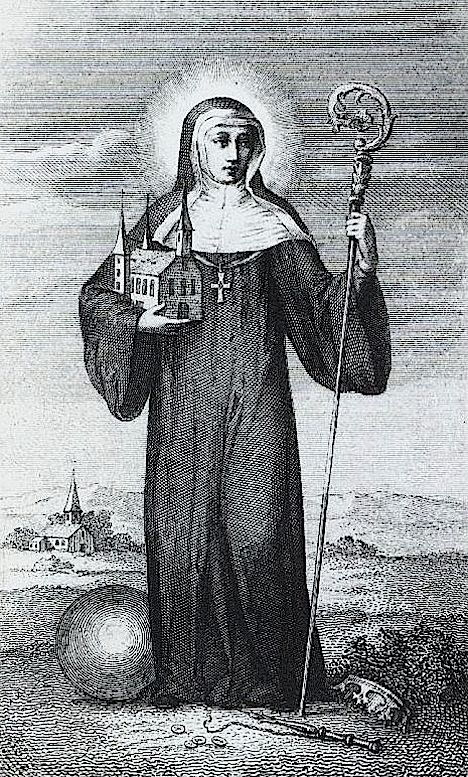
St. Irmina of Oeren.

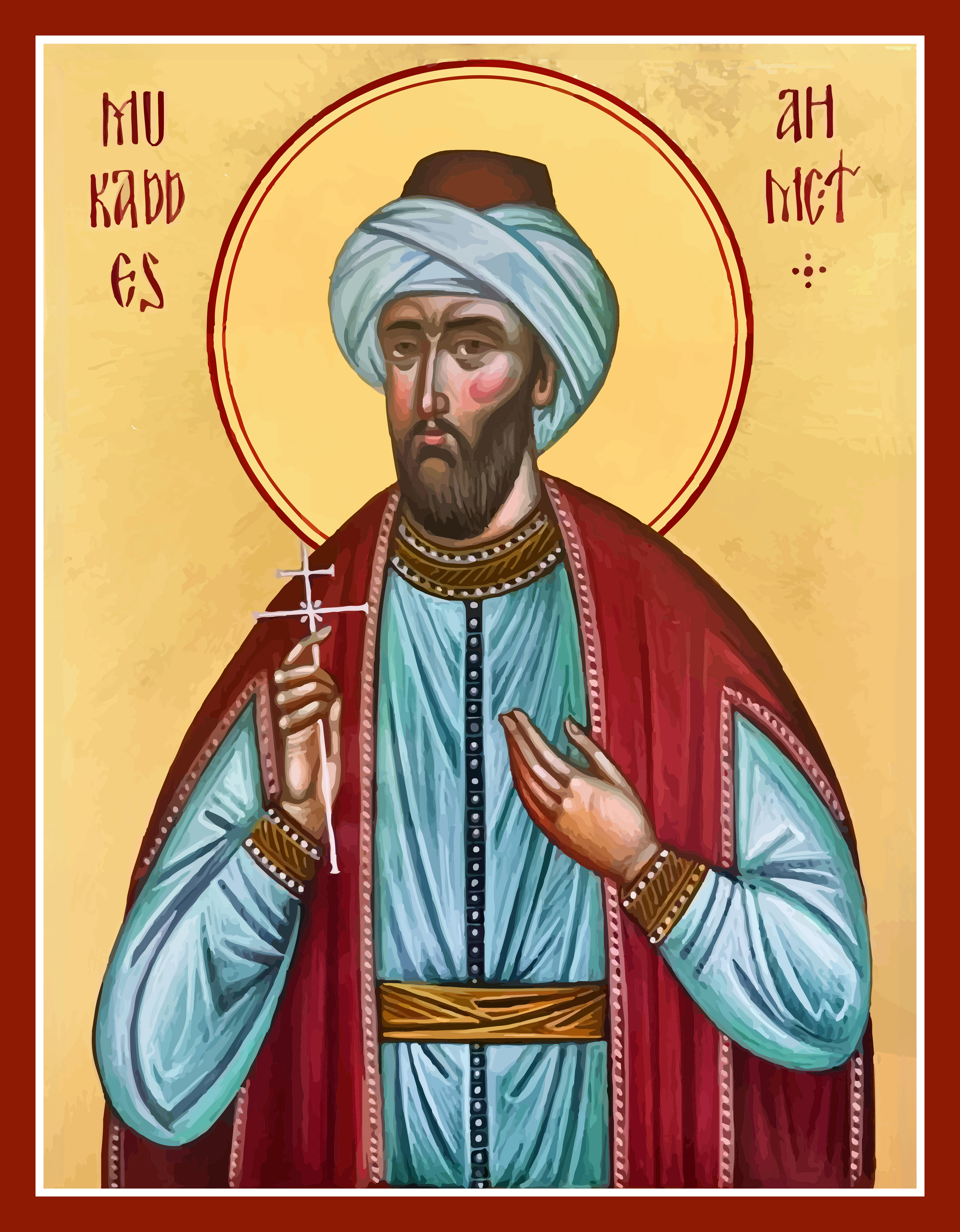
New Martyr Ahmet the Calligrapher.

New Hieromartyr Innocent Beda, Archimandrite of Voronezh.

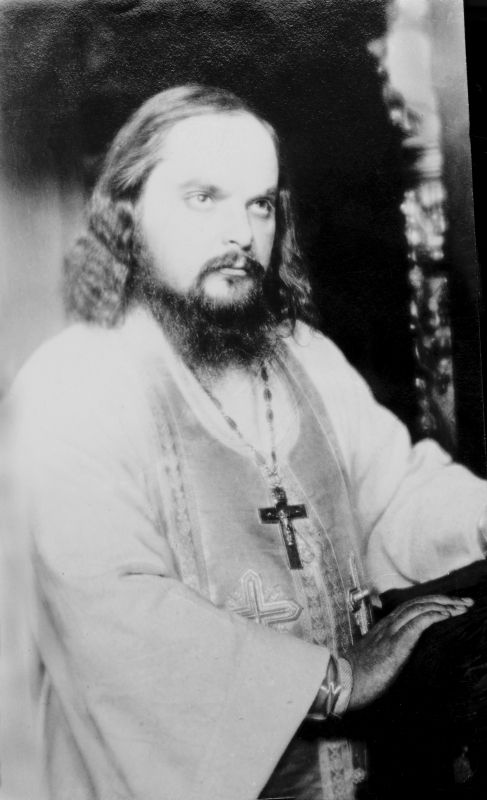
New Hieromartyr Sergius Mechev, Archpriest, of Moscow.

== Sources ==
- December 24/January 6. Orthodox Calendar (PRAVOSLAVIE.RU).
- January 6 / December 24. HOLY TRINITY RUSSIAN ORTHODOX CHURCH (A parish of the Patriarchate of Moscow).
- December 24. OCA - The Lives of the Saints.
- The Autonomous Orthodox Metropolia of Western Europe and the Americas (ROCOR). St. Hilarion Calendar of Saints for the year of our Lord 2004. St. Hilarion Press (Austin, TX). p. 2.
- December 24. Latin Saints of the Orthodox Patriarchate of Rome.
- The Roman Martyrology. Transl. by the Archbishop of Baltimore. Last Edition, According to the Copy Printed at Rome in 1914. Revised Edition, with the Imprimatur of His Eminence Cardinal Gibbons. Baltimore: John Murphy Company, 1916.

Greek Sources

- Great Synaxaristes: (in Greek) 24 ΔΕΚΕΜΒΡΙΟΥ. ΜΕΓΑΣ ΣΥΝΑΞΑΡΙΣΤΗΣ.
- (in Greek) Συναξαριστής. 24 Δεκεμβρίου. ECCLESIA.GR. (H ΕΚΚΛΗΣΙΑ ΤΗΣ ΕΛΛΑΔΟΣ).

Russian Sources

- (in Russian) 6 января (24 декабря). Православная Энциклопедия под редакцией Патриарха Московского и всея Руси Кирилла (электронная версия). (Orthodox Encyclopedia - Pravenc.ru).
- (in Russian) 24 декабря (ст.ст.) 6 января 2015 (нов. ст.). Русская Православная Церковь Отдел внешних церковных связей. (DECR).
