= Anthony-Rawḥ al-Qurashī =

Arab Christian martyr

Saint Anthony-Rawḥ al-Qurashī

Martyr
- Born: Rawḥ al-Qurashī possibly Damascus
- Died: December 25, 799 AD; Raqqa
- Venerated in: Pre-Congregation
- Canonized: Pre-Congregation

Anthony-Rawḥ al-Qurashī was an Arab Christian martyr and Saint of the late 8th century. The name al-Qurashī refers to the Quraysh tribe which he was descended from.

== Hagiography ==
Anthony, born Rawḥ al-Qurashī, was a Muslim nobleman from Damascus. He was a descendant of the Quraysh tribe which was the same tribe that the Islamic prophet Muhammad came from. Rawḥ lived in the abandoned monastery Dayr Murran that was dedicated to Saint Theodore on Mount Qasioun which had a functioning Church adjacent to it. Rawḥ would regularly sneak into the Church to steal the Eucharist and eat it and would even tear the crosses from their places, rip the altar cloths, and greatly harass the priest. One day, Rawḥ found the Church empty and decided to shoot the icon of St. Theodore above the altar with his bow. Rawḥ fired an arrow and it came within a foot of the icon but then suddenly turned back towards Rawḥ piercing him in his left hand which terrified him and knocked him unconscious. A few days later Rawḥ witnessed another miracle when he saw the Consecrated Host transform into a lamb during a Mass. That same night St. Theodore appeared to Rawḥ in a dream and chastised him for his behavior ordering him to embrace Christ and repent. Rawḥ was so moved by this vision that he set off to Jerusalem the next day to be baptized. However, the Patriarch Elias II of Jerusalem was afraid that by baptizing Rawḥ he would anger Muslim authorities so he sent him to the River Jordan to be baptized by a group of monks who submerged him, gave him a monastic cowl and the Christian name of Anthony.

When Anthony returned to Damascus his family mocked his coarse dress and turned him over to the Islamic judge after failing to bring him back to Islam. The judge berated Anthony saying "Shame on you, Rawḥ, why have you left your religion into which you were born, not to mention your esteem and nobility (ḥasabaka wa-sharafaka)?" When this did not convince Anthony either the judge sent him to Raqqa, the seat of the caliph Harun al-Rashid. Al-Rashīd also mocked Anthony for his monk's clothing, and after failing to convert him, ordered his execution. Anthony welcomed his sentence explaining that it would free him from his three greatest sins: having gone on hajj to Mecca, having sacrificed on ʿĪd al-Aḍḥā, and having killed Christians during raids against the Byzantines. Thus, Anthony was decapitated on Christmas Day 799 A.D.

According to Theodore Abu Qurrah:

In our own day there was a well-known martyr, from a family of the highest nobility among the outsiders, whose story is widespread. May he remember us in his prayers, he is called St. Anthony. He used to tell everyone he met that he came to believe in Christianity only because of a miracle he saw in connection with an icon that belonged to St. Theodore, the martyr.

== See also ==
- Abo of Tiflis
- Ahmet the Calligrapher
