= Abo of Tiflis =

Christian martyr (c.756–786)

Saint Abo of Tiflis
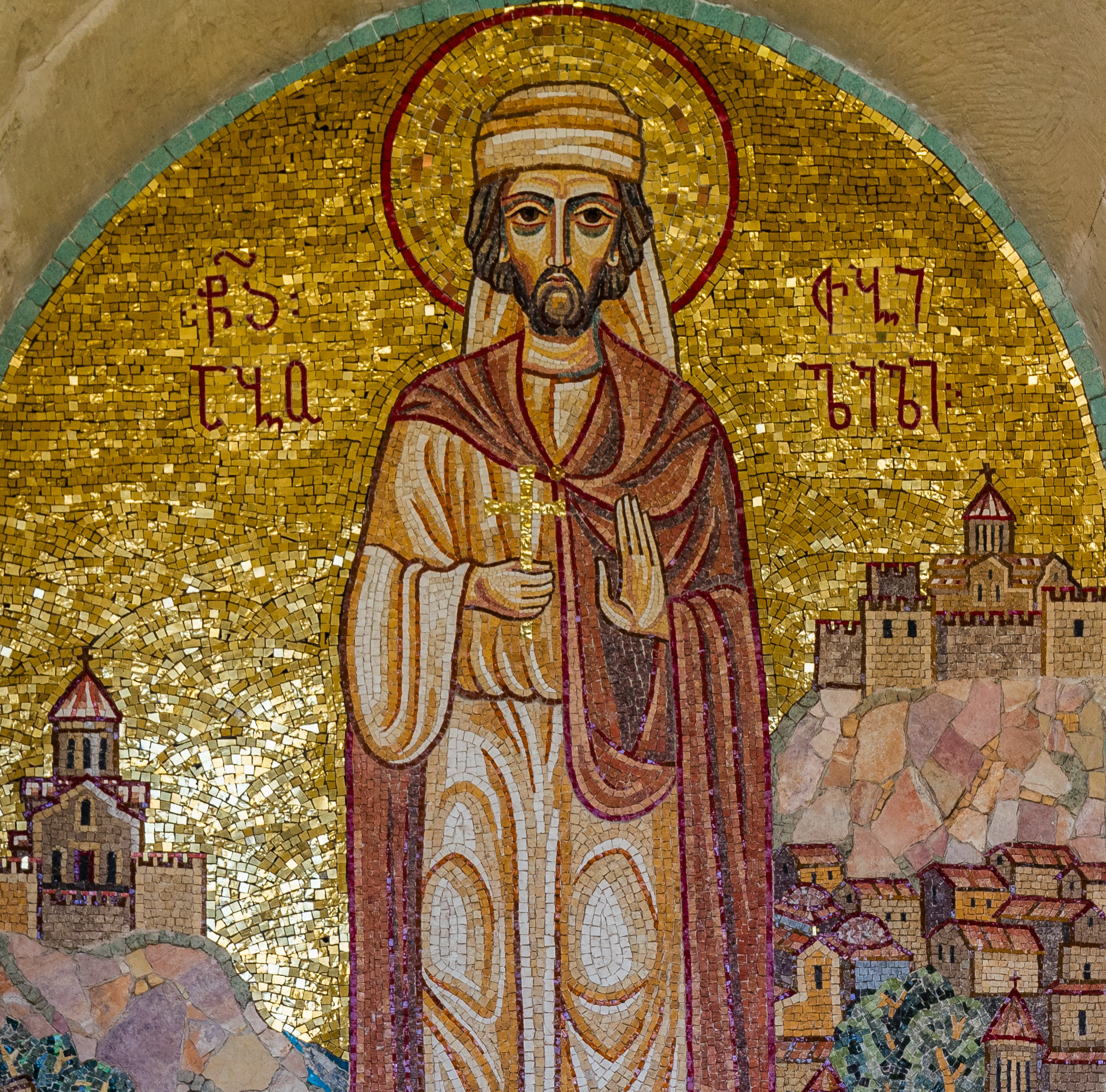
- St. Abo of Tiflis church in Tbilisi

Martyr
- Born: c. 756; Baghdad, Abbasid Caliphate
- Died: 6 January 786; Tbilisi, Emirate of Tbilisi
- Venerated in: Eastern Orthodox Church; Catholic Church
- Major shrine: Church of St. Abo, Tbilisi
- Feast: 8 January [O.S. 21 January]
- Attributes: Cross, martyr’s palm
- Patronage: Tbilisi

Abo of Tiflis (Arabic: أبو التفليسي, romanized: Abu al-Tiflisi; Georgian: აბო თბილელი, romanized: abo tbileli; c. 756 – 6 January 786) was a Christian martyr of Arab origin, who went on to practice his faith in what is now Tbilisi, the capital of present-day Georgia.

== Life ==
Arab by origin, Abo initially grew up as a Muslim in Baghdad. At the age of seventeen or eighteen, he found himself in Tbilisi, having followed Georgian Prince Nerses, the ruler of Kartli. Nerses, having been slandered before the Caliph, spent three years in confinement; freed by a new Caliph, he took Abo with him.

Abo's profession in Baghdad was that of a perfumer, in which he excelled as a maker of fine perfumes and ointments, the art evidently implying knowledge of chemistry. Upon his arrival to Eastern Georgia (Kartli), he converted to Christianity, which didn't happen immediately, but only after a committed soul-searching that involved heated quarrels even with Christian priests and bishops over the finer religious matters; those quarrels only consolidated him in his conviction that the truth was in Christianity. However, initially Abo was afraid to convert openly as eastern Georgia was under Arab rule; he only abandoned the Muslim habit of five-times prayers per-day and started praying in a Christian manner.

For political reasons, his prince had to seek shelter in Khazaria north of the Caspian Sea, an area which was not ruled by Muslims; Abo accompanied him, and was baptized there. From Khazaria, Nerses moved to the Abkhazia, that was also free from the Arab dominion, taking Abo with him. There, Abo zealously followed the Christian life of prayers and ascetic struggles, preparing himself for a future mission. Prince Nerses and his party returned to Tbilisi in 782, and Abo, notwithstanding the warning that it was not safe for him to go to Tbilisi, followed him.

For about three years, Abo openly confessed his Christian faith on the streets of Tbilisi - both fortifying by his example the Christians who attempted to escape Arab rule and trying to convert his Arab compatriots to Christianity. A series of threats and warnings failed to dampen his zeal. In 786, he was denounced as a Christian to the Arab officials in Tbilisi, and arrested. The judge attempted to persuade Abo to return to the faith of his ancestors. He confessed his faith at trial, was imprisoned, and executed on 6 January 786.

Ioane Sabanisdze, Georgian religious writer and Abo's contemporary, compiled the martyr's life in his hagiography The Martyrdom of Saint Abo.

== See also ==
- Ubayd Allah ibn Jahsh
- Anthony-Rawḥ al-Qurashī
- Abraham of Bulgaria
- Ahmet the Calligrapher

== Gallery ==
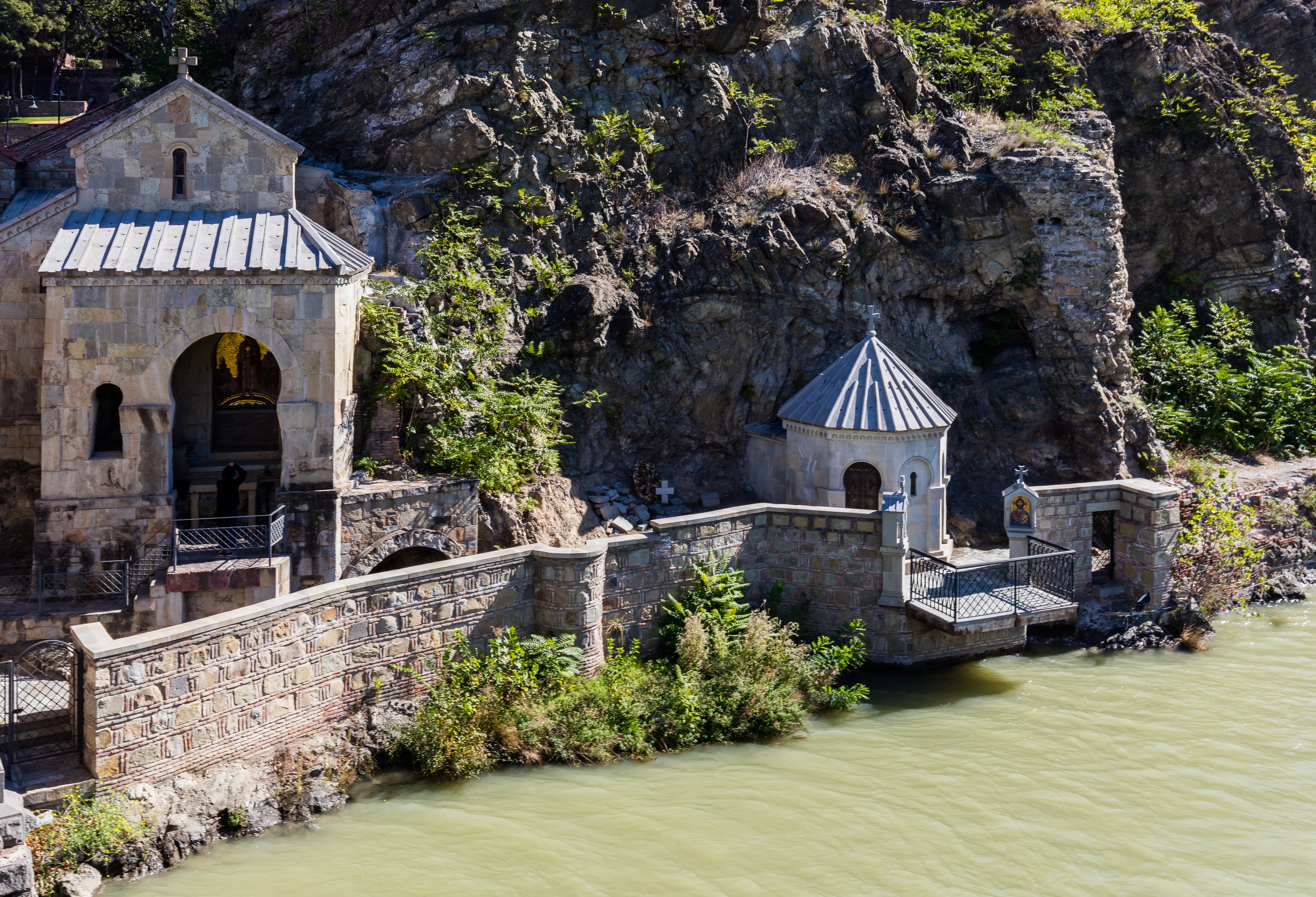
View of the church along Kura River.

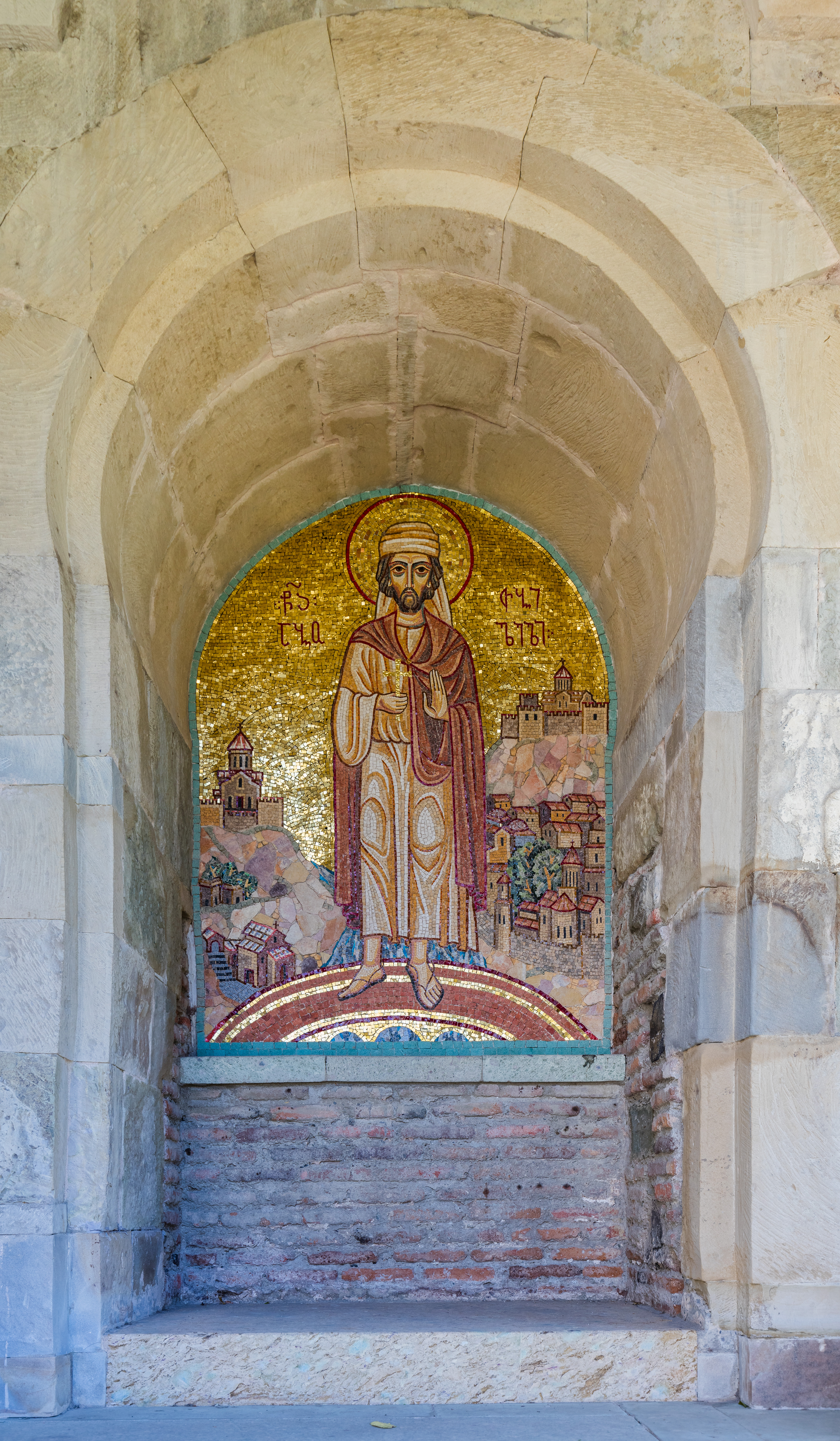
Small chapel with mosaic of Saint Abo.

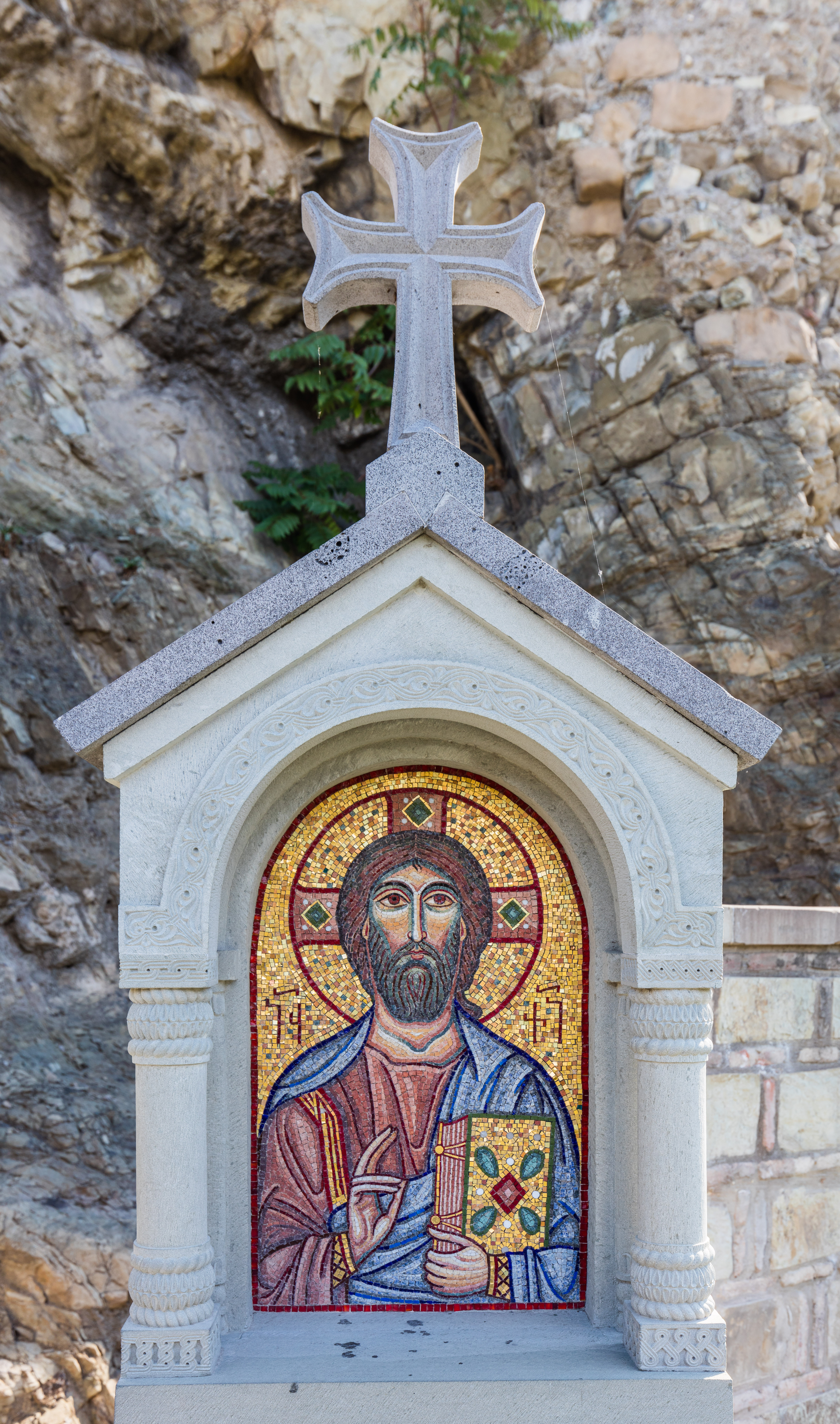
Mosaic of Christ at chapel of Saint Abo.

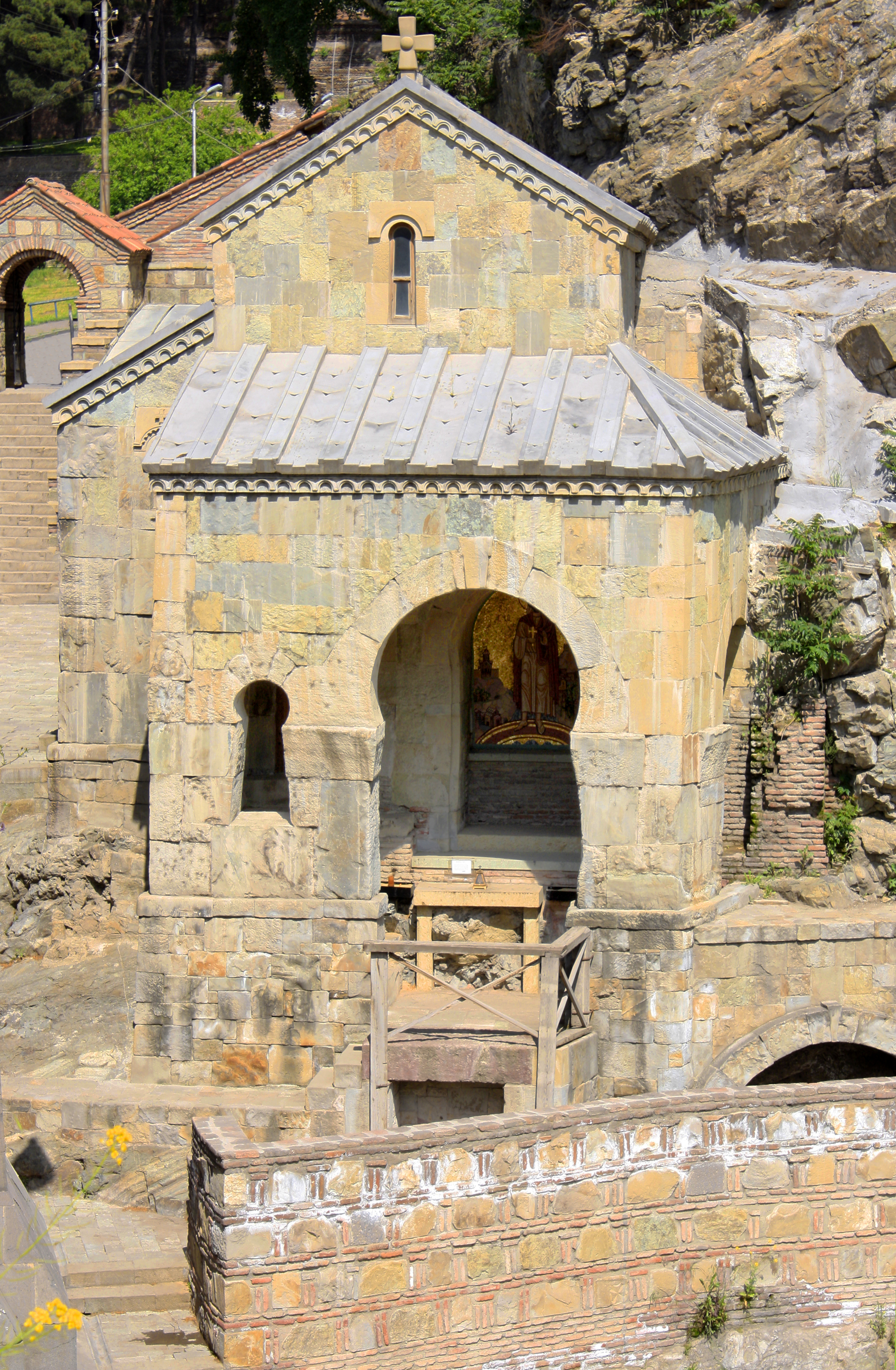
St. Abo of Tiflis church in Tbilisi.

== Sources ==
- Attwater, Donald; John, Catherine Rachel (1993). The Penguin Dictionary of Saints (3rd ed.). Penguin Books. ISBN 0-14-051312-4.
- Holweck, Frederick George (1924). A Biographical Dictionary of the Saints: With a General Introduction on Hagiology. B. Herder Book Company.
- Lang, David Marshall (1956). Lives and Legends of the Georgian Saints. Allen & Unwin.
- Rapp Jr., Stephen H. (2017). The Sasanian World through Georgian Eyes. Routledge.
- Thomson, Robert W. (1996). Rewriting Caucasian History. Oxford University Press.
- Toumanoff, Cyril (1963). Studies in Christian Caucasian History. Georgetown University Press.
