= Leontius (disambiguation) =

Leontius or Leontios (Λεοντιος) is a male name of Greek origin, popular in Byzantine Empire and in Orthodox countries.

Variations: French: Léonce, Italian: Leonzio, Spanish: Leoncio, Russian: Leontiy (Леонтий).

It may refer to:

== Saints ==
- Leontius (died 70–79), of Leontius, Hypatius and Theodulus
- Leontius of Camerino (d. c. 250), bishop of Camerino
- Leontius and Euprepius (d.c. 287 or c. 303 AD), brothers of Cosmas and Damian
- Leontius of Caesarea (died 337), bishop of Caesarea and saint
- Leontius of Autun (died c. 430), bishop of Autun and saint
- Leontius of Vanand (died 455), namesake of the Leontine martyrs
- Leontius of Fréjus (died 488), bishop of Fréjus and saint
- Leontius the Elder (d. c. 541), bishop of Bordeaux
- Leontius of Saintes, bishop of Saintes, 7th century
- Leontius of Constantinople, with Martyrs Julian, Marcian, John, James, Alexius, Demetrius, Photius, Peter, and Mary (d. 730), feast day August 9, Eastern Orthodox liturgics
- Leontius of Rostov (c. 1016 – c. 1073), Russian Orthodox bishop and saint, feast day May 23
- Leontius of Monemvasia and Achaia (1377–1452), Greek Orthodox ascetic and saint
- Leontius von Wimpffen of Tsarevo (1873–1919), Russian Orthodox bishop of Yenotayevka and hieromartyr
- Leontius Stasievich (1884–1972), Russian Orthodox archimandrite and New Confessor

== Others Church figures ==
- Leontius of Antioch or Leontius the Eunuch (4th century), Patriarch of Antioch 344–358
- Leontius of Trier (died 446), bishop of Trier
- Leontius, Bishop of Magnesia (fl. 451)
- Leontius of Byzantium (485–543), Byzantine theological writer
- Leontius I of Bordeaux, Archbishop of Bordeaux after 520
- Leontius II of Bordeaux, Archbishop of Bordeaux 542–564
- Leontius (archbishop of Lyon) (early 6th century)
- Leontius of Jerusalem (6th century), Byzantine theological writer historically confused with Leontius of Byzantium
- Leontios of Neapolis (7th century), bishop of Neapolis
- Łewond (fl. late 8th century), Armenian priest and historian
- Leontius of Damascus (fl. late 8th century), Syrian monk and writer
- Leontius of Bulgaria, Patriarch of Bulgaria c. 918 – c. 927
- Leontius I of Jerusalem, Patriarch of Jerusalem 911–928
- Leontius of Alexandria (11th century), Greek Patriarch of Alexandria 1052–1059
- Leontius of Ruisi (11th century), Georgian chronicler
- Leontius II of Jerusalem (died 1190), Patriarch of Jerusalem 1170–1190
- Leontius of Constantinople (died after 1190), Ecumenical Patriarch of Constantinople 1189
- Leontius Pilatus (died 1366), Greek Calabrian scholar
- Leontius Pełczycki (died 1595), Orthodox and Uniate bishop in Lithuania
- Leontius, Metropolitan of Belgrade, Metropolitan of Belgrade 1801–1813
- Leontios of Cyprus (1896–1947), Archbishop of Cyprus
- Leontius Turkevich (1876–1965), Metropolitan of the North American Diocese of the Russian Orthodox Church 1950–1965

== Rulers and warriors ==
- Domitius Leontius, politician of the Roman Empire in the 4th century AD.
- Leontius (usurper) (died 488), Byzantine usurper 484–488, sometimes Leontius I
- Leontius (general under Phocas) (7th-century), Byzantine general
- Leontius (d. 706), Byzantine emperor, sometimes Leontius II

== Others ==
- Leontios Machairas (c. 1380 – after 1432), historian in Cyprus
- Leontios Chatziapostolou (1894–1980), Greek lawyer and politician
- Leontios Petmezas (born 1965), Greek contemporary theorist, art historian, book critic, author, and journalist

== In philosophy ==
- Leontius son of Aglaion, an imaginary character in Plato's Republic used to convey a principle
