= December 23 (Eastern Orthodox liturgics) =

Day in the Eastern Orthodox liturgical calendar

Eastern Orthodox liturgical calendar
December 22	December 23	December 24
December 23 O.S. ≍ January 5 N.S. December 23 N.S ≍ December 10 O.S.

An Eastern Orthodox cross

December 23 in Eastern Orthodox liturgical calendars is a feast day and a day of commemoration of saints and martyrs. Although some Orthodox churches use the Revised Julian Calendar and others use the traditional Julian calendar, the fixed commemorations for their respective December 23 are broadly the same, no matter which calendar is used. (Note: Despite the dates being the same, the days to which they refer typically differ by 13 days. The notation Old Style or O.S. is sometimes used to indicate a date in the traditional Julian Calendar (the "Old Calendar"). The notation New Style or N.S. indicates a date in the Revised Julian calendar (the "New Calendar").)

== Feasts ==
- Forefeast of the Nativity of Christ (Note: The Forefeast of the Nativity of the Lord begins on December 20. From now on, most of the liturgical hymns will be concerned with the birth of the Savior.)

== Saints ==
- Holy Ten Martyrs of Crete (250): (Note: The Ten Holy Martyrs of Crete: Theodulus, Satorninus, Euporus, Gelasius, Eunician, Zoticus, Pompius, Agathopus, Basilides and Evarestus suffered for Christ during the 3rd century under the emperor Decius (249-251). The governor of Crete, named Decius just like the emperor, fiercely persecuted the Cretan Church. One time there were brought before him 10 Christians from various cities of Crete, who at the trial steadfastly confessed their faith in Christ and refused to worship idols. Over the course of 30 days they were subjected to cruel tortures, and with the help of God they all persevered, glorifying God. Before their death they prayed, that the Lord would enlighten their torturers with the light of the true faith. All the saints were beheaded.)
  - Theodulus, Saturninus, Euporus, Gelasius, Eunician, Zoticus, Pompeius (Pontius), Agathopus, Basilides, and Evaristus.
- Martyr Schinon (Skinus), by the sword.
- Saint Paul, Bishop of Neocaesarea, a father of the First Ecumenical Council (4th century)
- Saint Niphon, Bishop of Constantia, Cyprus (4th century)
- Saint Chrysogonos (Chrysogonus). (Note: St. Chrysogonos (Chrysogonus) is not recorded in the Synaxaria or in the bound Menaia. However his memory is preserved in the Sabaitic Codex 635, on this day, as follows: "Chrysogonus, Eparch of the city of Thessalonika". (Greek: «Χρυσογόνου ἔπαρχου πόλεως Θεσσαλονίκης»))
- Venerable David of Echmiadzin in Armenia (693)
- Saint Naum (Nahum) of Ochrid, Enlightener of the Bulgarians (910) (see also May 11 - Greek; and July 27)

== Pre-Schism Western saints ==
- Virgin Martyrs Victoria and Anatolia, two sisters martyred in Rome for refusing to marry pagans (250) (Note: "AT Rome, the holy virgin Victoria, a martyr, in the persecution of the emperor Decius. She had been promised in marriage to a pagan named Eugene, but because she refused to marry him and to offer sacrifice to idols, and because by working many miracles, she brought many virgins to the service of God, she was, at the request of her betrothed, stabbed in the heart with a sword by the executioner.")
- Martyrs Migdonius and Mardonius, high officials at the imperial court in Rome, under Diocletian (303) (Note: High officials at the imperial court in Rome. When persecution broke out under Diocletian in 303, they refused to renounce their Faith. Migdonius was burnt at the stake and Mardonius drowned in a well.)
- Saint Servulus, a righteous man who was a cripple, used to beg for alms at the door of the church of Saint Clement in Rome, sharing what he received with other beggars (c. 590) (Note: "At Rome, blessed Servulus, of whom St. Gregory writes, that a paralytic from his early years to the end of his life, he remained lying in a porch near St. Clement's Church, and being invited by the chant of angels, he went to enjoy the glory of Paradise. At his tomb, frequent miracles are wrought by Almighty God.")
- Saint Dagobert II, King of Austrasia in the east of France, was exiled to a monastery in 656, recalled in 675 and martyred by the tyrant Ebroin (679)
- Saint Mazota, leader of a group of nineteen holy virgins who went from Ireland to Scotland and founded a monastery at Abernethy on the Tay (7th century)
- Saint Egbert (Ecgberht) of Rathmelsigi Abbey and Ripon, who organised the mission to Frisia, Netherlands (729) (see also April 24 - Latin calendar)
- Saint Frithbert, successor of Saint Acca as Bishop of Hexham, where he served for thirty-four years (766) (Note: "ST. FRITHEBERT succeeded St. Acca as Bishop of Hexham, and ruled that diocese in great holiness of life during the long period of thirty-four years. He also administered the Church of Lindisfarne during the imprisonment of Cynewolf, the Bishop. St. Frithebert was called to his heavenly reward on the 23rd December, A.D. 766.")
- Saint Vintila, a monk who reposed as a hermit in Punxín in Galicia in Spain (890)

== Post-Schism Orthodox saints ==
- Saint Theoctistus (Feoktist), Archbishop of Novgorod (1310)
- Saint Antonina Diaconu, Nun from Tismana Monastery (2011) (Note: See: (in Romanian) Antonina Diaconu. Wikipedia. (Romanian Wikipedia).)

=== New martyrs and confessors ===
- New Hieromartyrs John Piankov and Nicholas Yakhontov, Priests (1918) (see also December 4)
- New Hieromartyr Paul Kratirov, Bishop of Starobelsk (1932)
- New Hieromartyr Basil Spassky, Priest, at Tver (1938)
- New Hieromartyr Macarius Mironov, Hieromonk of Zavidovskaya Gorka (Tver) (1938)
- New Hieromartyr John Smirnov, Hieromonk of Bolshoye Mikhailovskoye (Tver) (1938)

== Other commemorations ==
- Commemoration of the Consecration and re-dedication of the Church of Hagia Sophia (Holy Wisdom), by Saint Eutychius of Constantinople (562)
- Repose of Eldress Eudocia Rodionova of Leushino Monastery, Fool-for-Christ (1886) (Note: (in Russian) Webpage of the Leushino Monastery, now submerged under the waters of the Rybinsk Sea.) (Note: See: (in Russian) Леушинский Иоанно-Предтеченский монастырь. Википедии. (Russian Wikipedia).)

== Icon gallery ==
The Holy Ten Martyrs of Crete.
(Menologion of Basil II, 10th century).

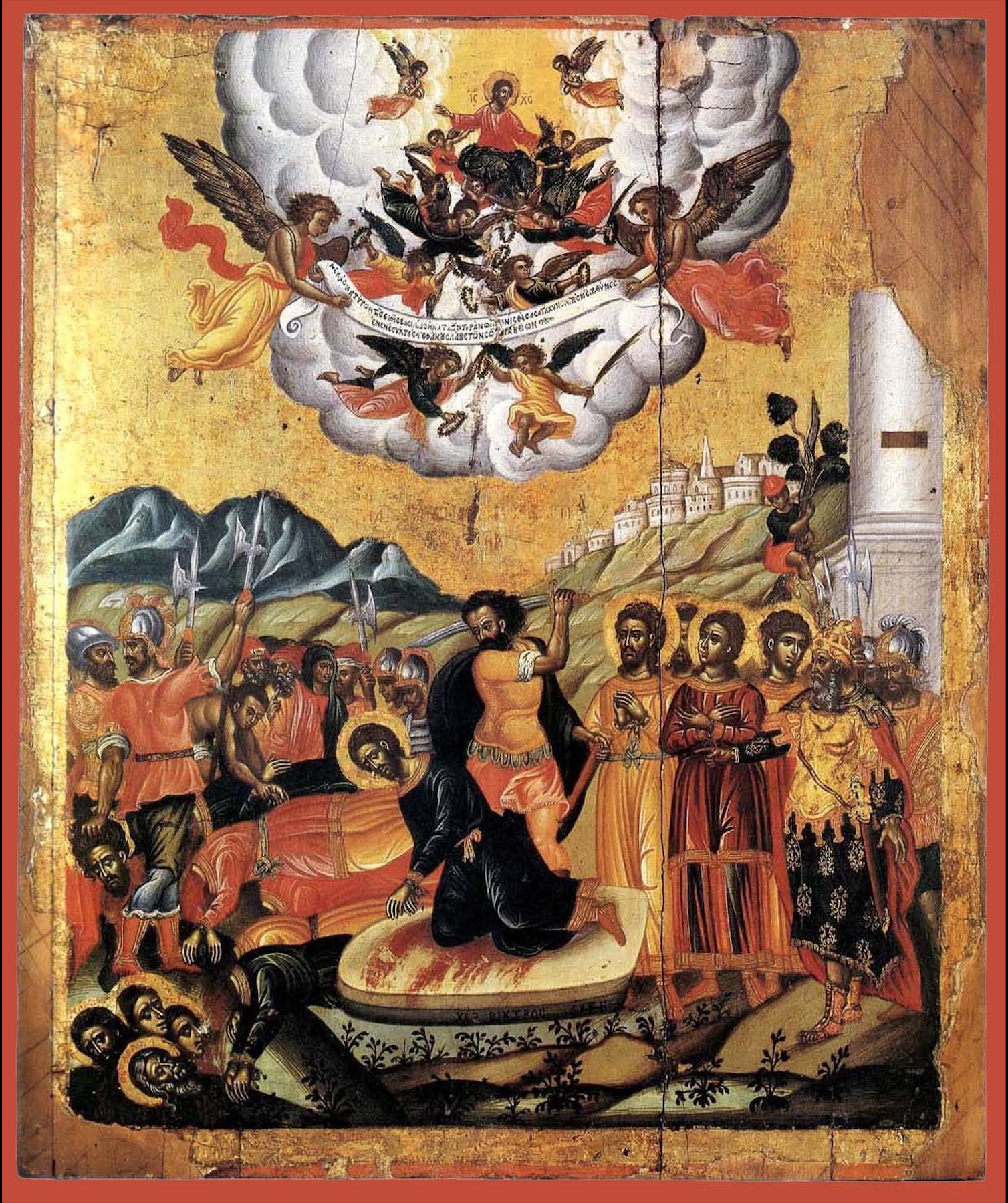
The Holy Ten Martyrs of Crete.

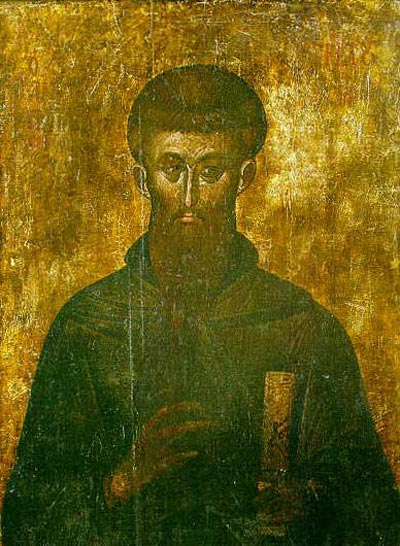
St. Naum of Ochrid.

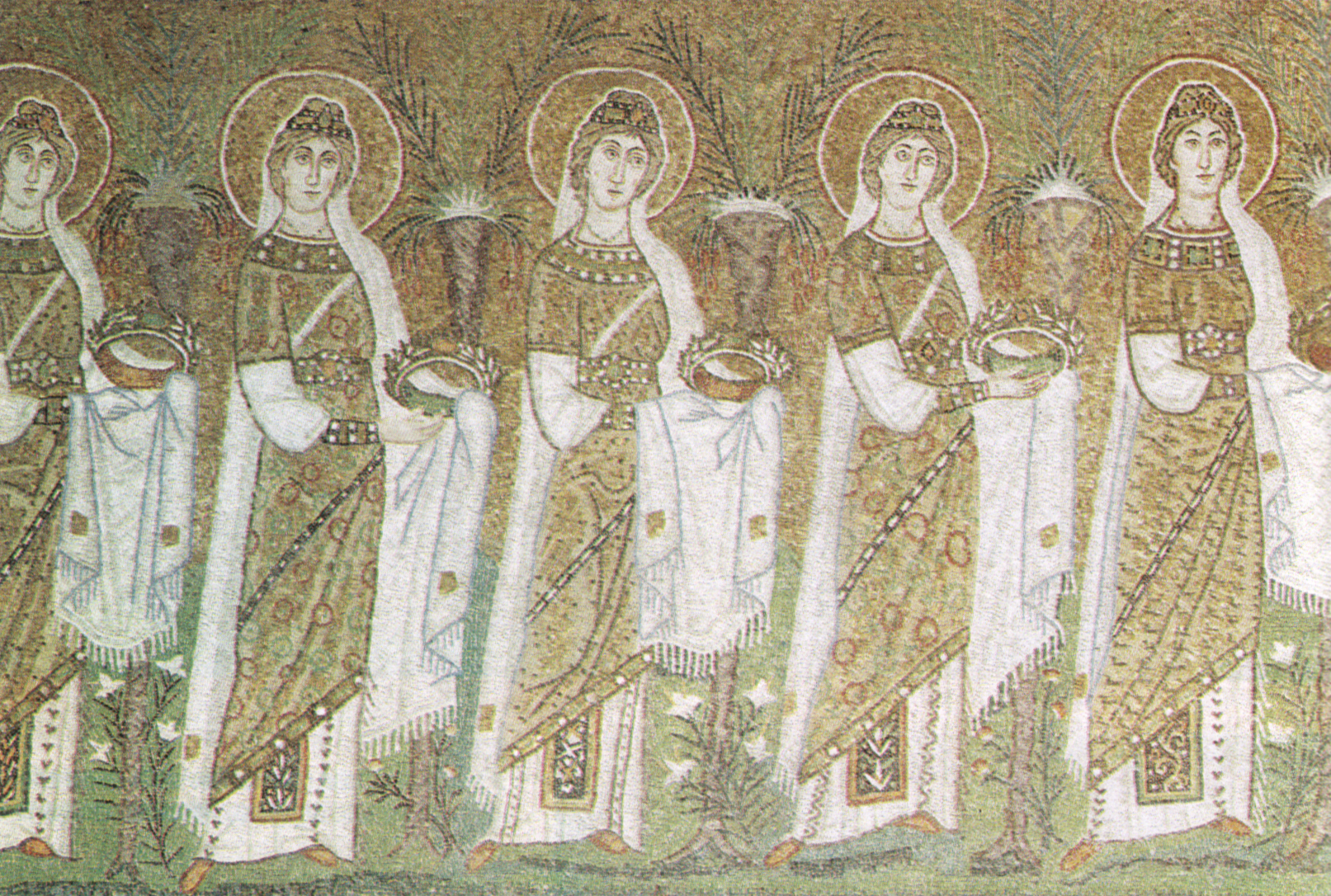
Victoria and Anatolia are portrayed amongst the mosaic Procession of Virgins in the Basilica of Sant'Apollinare Nuovo, Ravenna.

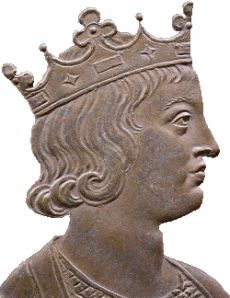
Bronze medallion of King Dagobert II, c. 1720.

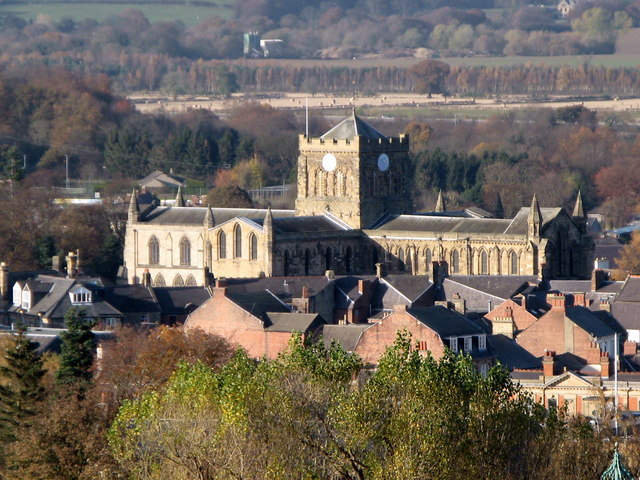
Hexham Abbey, where St. Frithubeorht was Bishop from 734 to 766.

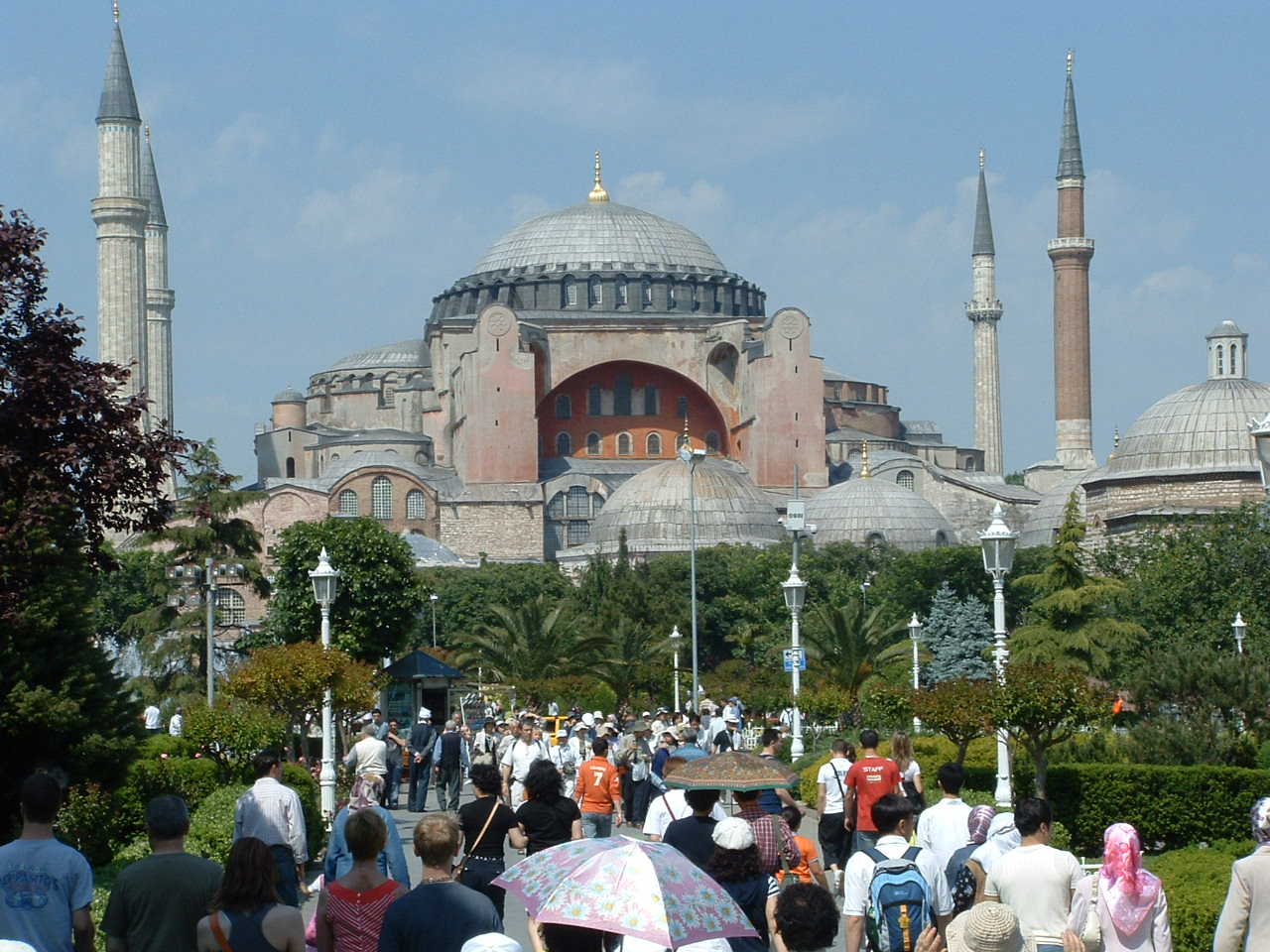
Hagia Sophia.

== Sources ==
- December 23/January 5. Orthodox Calendar (PRAVOSLAVIE.RU).
- January 5 / December 23. HOLY TRINITY RUSSIAN ORTHODOX CHURCH (A parish of the Patriarchate of Moscow).
- December 23. OCA - The Lives of the Saints.
- The Autonomous Orthodox Metropolia of Western Europe and the Americas (ROCOR). St. Hilarion Calendar of Saints for the year of our Lord 2004. St. Hilarion Press (Austin, TX). p. 2.
- December 23. Latin Saints of the Orthodox Patriarchate of Rome.
- The Roman Martyrology. Transl. by the Archbishop of Baltimore. Last Edition, According to the Copy Printed at Rome in 1914. Revised Edition, with the Imprimatur of His Eminence Cardinal Gibbons. Baltimore: John Murphy Company, 1916.

Greek Sources

- Great Synaxaristes: (in Greek) 23 ΔΕΚΕΜΒΡΙΟΥ. ΜΕΓΑΣ ΣΥΝΑΞΑΡΙΣΤΗΣ.
- (in Greek) Συναξαριστής. 23 Δεκεμβρίου. ECCLESIA.GR. (H ΕΚΚΛΗΣΙΑ ΤΗΣ ΕΛΛΑΔΟΣ).

Russian Sources

- (in Russian) 5 января (23 декабря). Православная Энциклопедия под редакцией Патриарха Московского и всея Руси Кирилла (электронная версия). (Orthodox Encyclopedia - Pravenc.ru).
- (in Russian) 23 декабря (ст.ст.) 5 января 2015 (нов. ст.). Русская Православная Церковь Отдел внешних церковных связей. (DECR).
