= Léonce =

- Gender: Both

Origin
- Region of origin: French speaking regions

Other names
- Related names: Léon, Léo

Léonce is a French unisex given name, form of Greek name Leontius . People with the name Léonce include:

- Léonce (actor) (1823–1900), French actor and singer
- Léonce Bekemans (born 1950), Belgian economist and scholar
- Léonce-Henri Burel (1892–1977), French cinematographer
- Léonce Corne (1894–1977), French film actor
- Léonce Lagarde (1860–1936), French colonial governor of French Somaliland and ambassador
- Léonce Perret (1880–1935), French film actor, director and producer
- Léonce Rosenberg (1879–1947), French art historian, art collector and publisher
- Léonce Verny (1837–1908), French officer and naval engineer
