= Gregory of Spoleto =

Saint Gregory of Spoleto
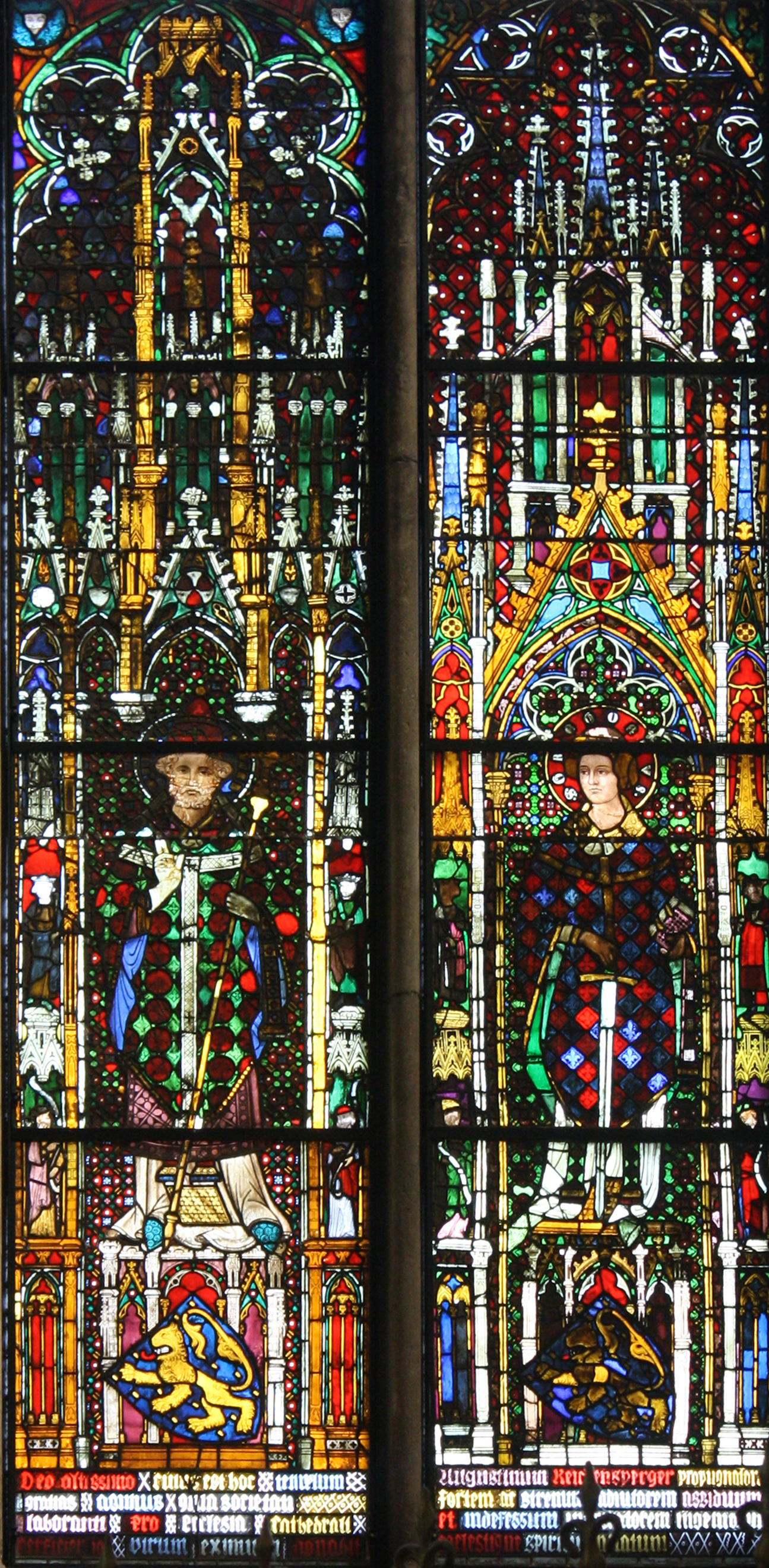
- Born: 3rd century
- Died: 24 December 304
- Venerated in: Roman Catholic Church
- Feast: 24 December

Saint Gregory of Spoleto was a priest and martyr of the city of Spoleto, Italy.

It happened that Flaccus, a general of the forces, arrived at Spoleto with an order from the Emperor Maximian to punish all the Christians. An information was laid before him, that Gregory seduced many from honoring the gods and the emperors. Soldiers were immediately dispatched to bring him bound before the tribunal.

After a lengthy period of torture, he was beheaded on 24 December 304. According to pious tradition, after his death his remains were to be fed to the wild animals kept for public games. However, a Christian woman (whose name is not known) bought them back for a considerable sum of money and had them properly prepared for burial. At the request of the Holy Roman Emperor, Otto I, Gregory's body was sent to Cologne, Germany with the relics of Saints Felix and Nabor. In 993, some of Gregory's relics were transferred to the cathedral in Trier, Germany by the bishop, Egbert.

His feast day is listed in the Roman Martyrology as 24 December but he is also commemorated on other days in different locations. For example, his feast is kept on 23 December in Cologne, 22 December in Spoleto, and 2 January in Trier.

== Sources ==
- Holweck, F. G., A Biographical Dictionary of the Saints. 1924.
