= Mirax of Egypt =

Egyptian Eastern Orthodox saint

Mirax
- Venerated in: Eastern Orthodox Church, Eastern Catholic Churches
- Feast: December 11

The martyr Mirax (fl. 7th century) was raised by Christian parents in the city of Tanis, Egypt. He renounced his faith to enter the service of an emir, to the great grief of his family. Mirax's parents resorted to prayer with great devotion for their son to convert back. Mirax returned to his family and, after much counsel, decided to publicly declare his return to the Christian faith. Consequently, Saint Mirax was tortured, beheaded, and his body cast into the sea.

Saint Mirax is celebrated by the Eastern Christian Churches on 11 December.

== See also ==
- Anthony the Great
- Mary of Egypt
- Forty Martyrs of Sebaste
- Coptic Orthodox Church
