= Leontius of Monemvasia =

Eastern Orthodox saint

Saint Saint Leontius of Monemvasia
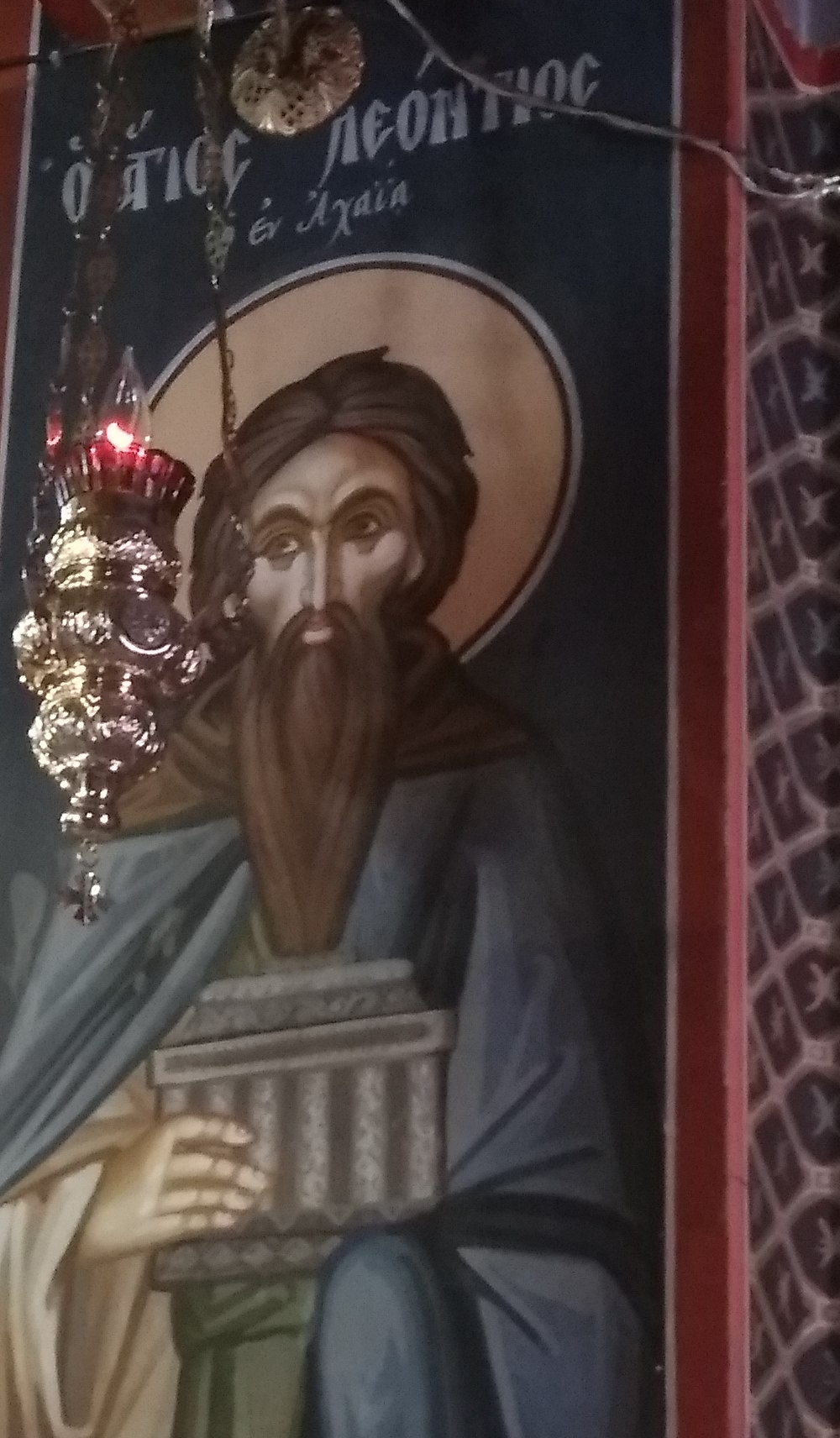
- Saint Leontios of Monemvasia
- Born: 1377; Monemvasia
- Died: 11 December 1452; Taxiarchon Monastery, Achaea
- Venerated in: Eastern Orthodox Church
- Canonized: 15th century
- Major shrine: Monastery of the Pammegiston Taxiarchon (the All-Great Taxiarchs, the Holy Archangels) in Achaea, Greece
- Feast: 11 December

Saint Leontius of Monemvasia or Saint Leontius of Achaia (Greek: Άγιος Λεόντιος o Μονεμβασιώτης ή Ὅσιος Λεόντιος ὁ ἐν Ἀχαΐᾳ), was an Eastern Orthodox Saint born in Monemvasia in 1377 and lived in asceticism in the region of north Peloponnese in the 15th century. Details about his life are known mainly from his first biographer, who, according to some scholars, is the Byzantine philosopher and Ecumenical Patriarch of Constantinople, Gennadius Scholarius.

The biography entitled in Greek "Ἐγκώμιον τοῦ ὁσίου Λεοντίου τοῦ ἐν Ἀχαΐᾳ, οὗ ἡ μνήμη τελεῖται τῇ ια´ τοῦ Δεκεμβρίου μηνός" is found in the manuscript Gr. II, 186 (=1180) of the Biblioteca Marciana.

Saint Leontios was born into an aristocratic family. His mother Theodora was a daughter of the emperor Andronikos II Palaiologos and his father Andrew was the governor of the Peloponnese. He went to Constantinople for higher studies in Philosophy and Science, but later, he returned to Monemvasia and became a monk. It started with the visit to Mount Athos, where he stayed for some time, living an ascetic life. Later, he realized that he should go to north Peloponnese to a specific area close to the modern city of Aigio, in the Achaea region.

On arriving close to Klokos Mountain, he built a small church dedicated to the holy Archangels, and he lived in an inaccessible place, continuing his ascetic life. With the support of his uncles Thomas Palaiologos and Demetrios Paleologos, who were impressed by the saintliness of their nephew's life, he established the monastery of the Archangels Michael and Gabriel (known as the Monastery of Pammegiston Taxiarchon).

The Palaiologos family donated relics of Saints to the monastery, the most important associated with the Holy Passion of the Lord (small portions of the True Cross, the Crown of Thorns, the Sponge, and the Purple Robe of the Lord). Today, the Honorable Body of Saint Leontios is kept in a special shrine in the church of the Holy Archangels inside the monastery. There is a church in his name in the town of Aigio and another in Monemvasia.

== Gallery ==
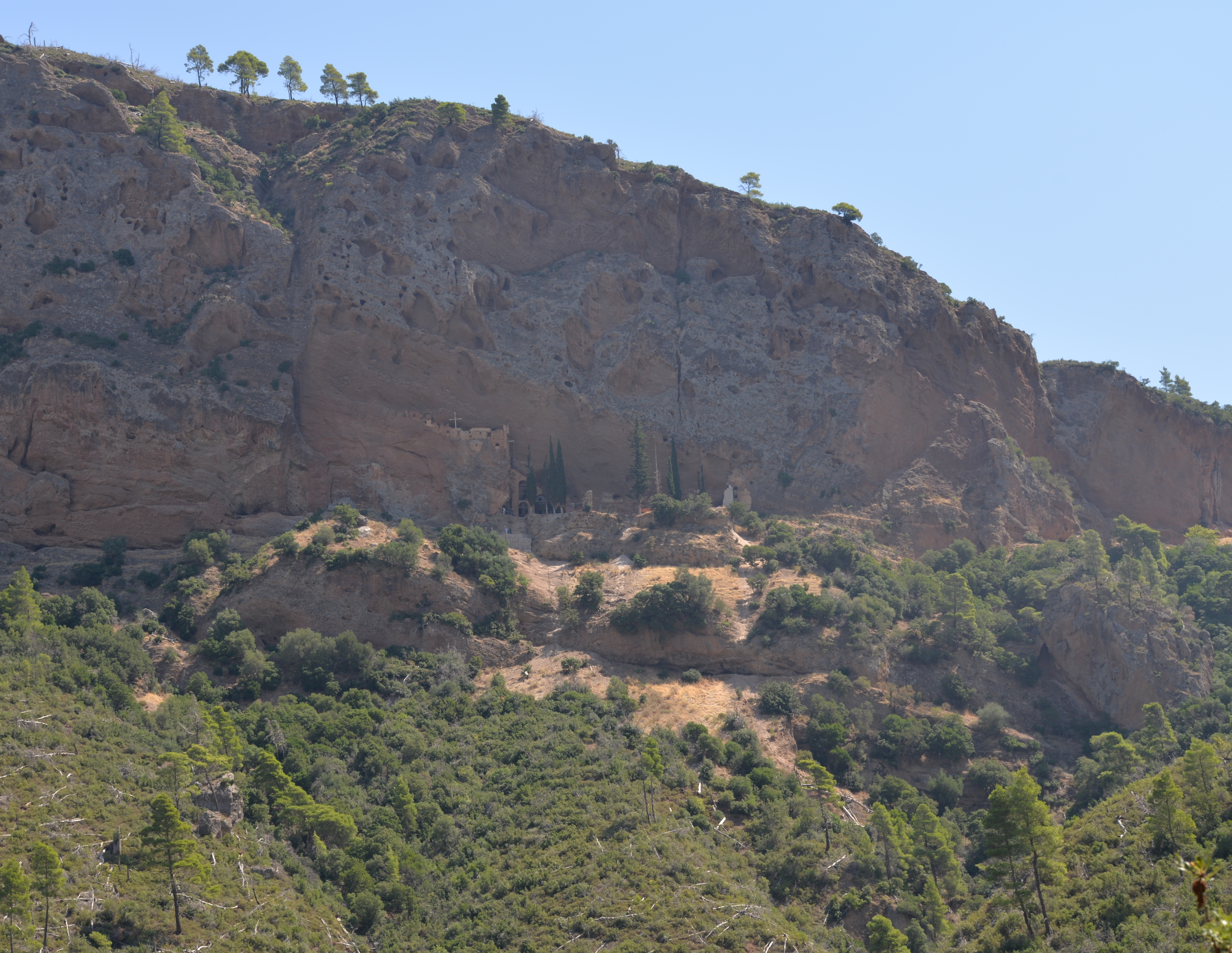
View of the old monastery of the Holy Archangels (Pammegiston Taxiarchon) established by Saint Leontios, as seen from where today lies the monastery of Pammegiston Taxiarchon.

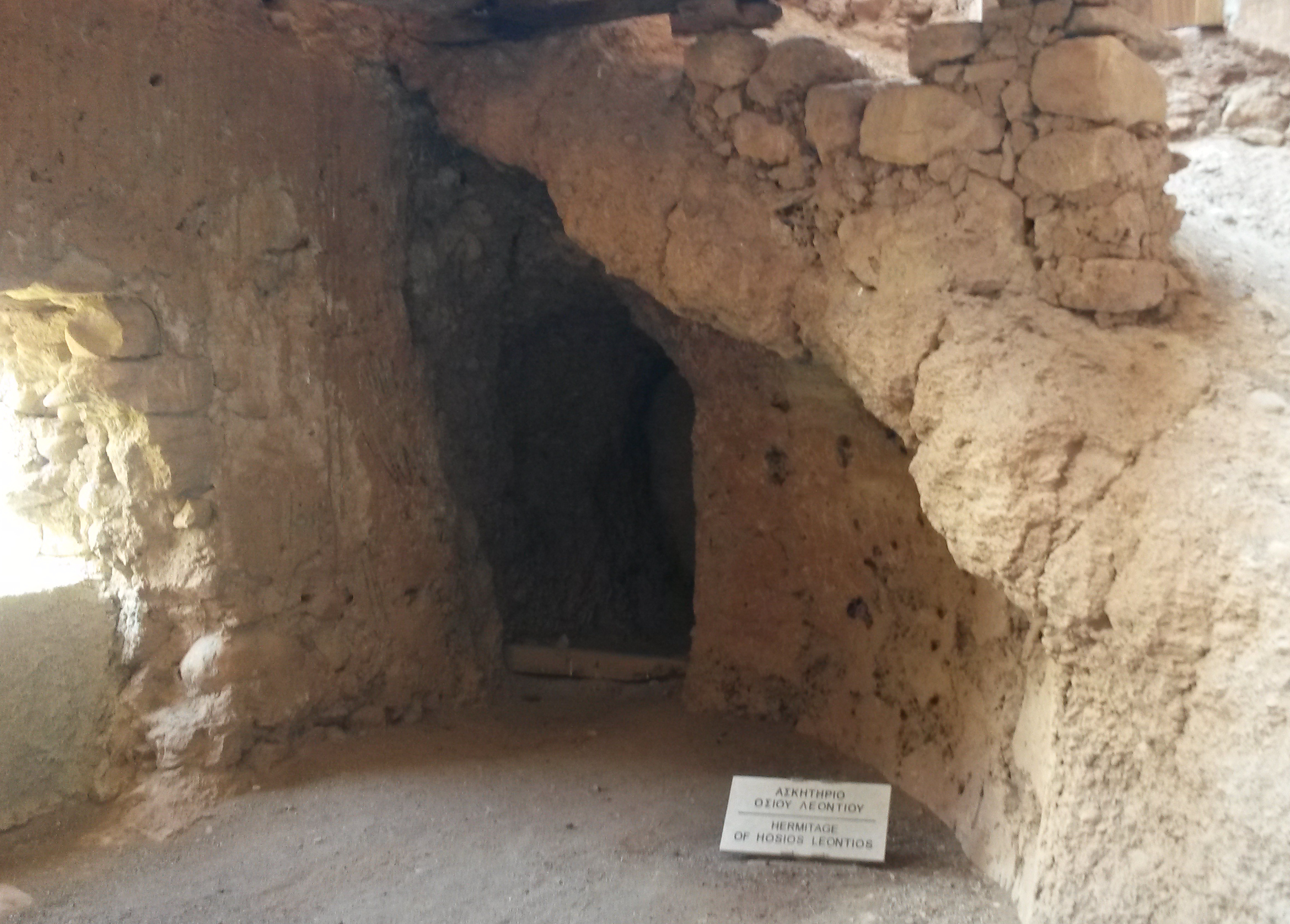
Hermitage of Saint Leontius, a tiny cave in the rock where the old monastery was built.

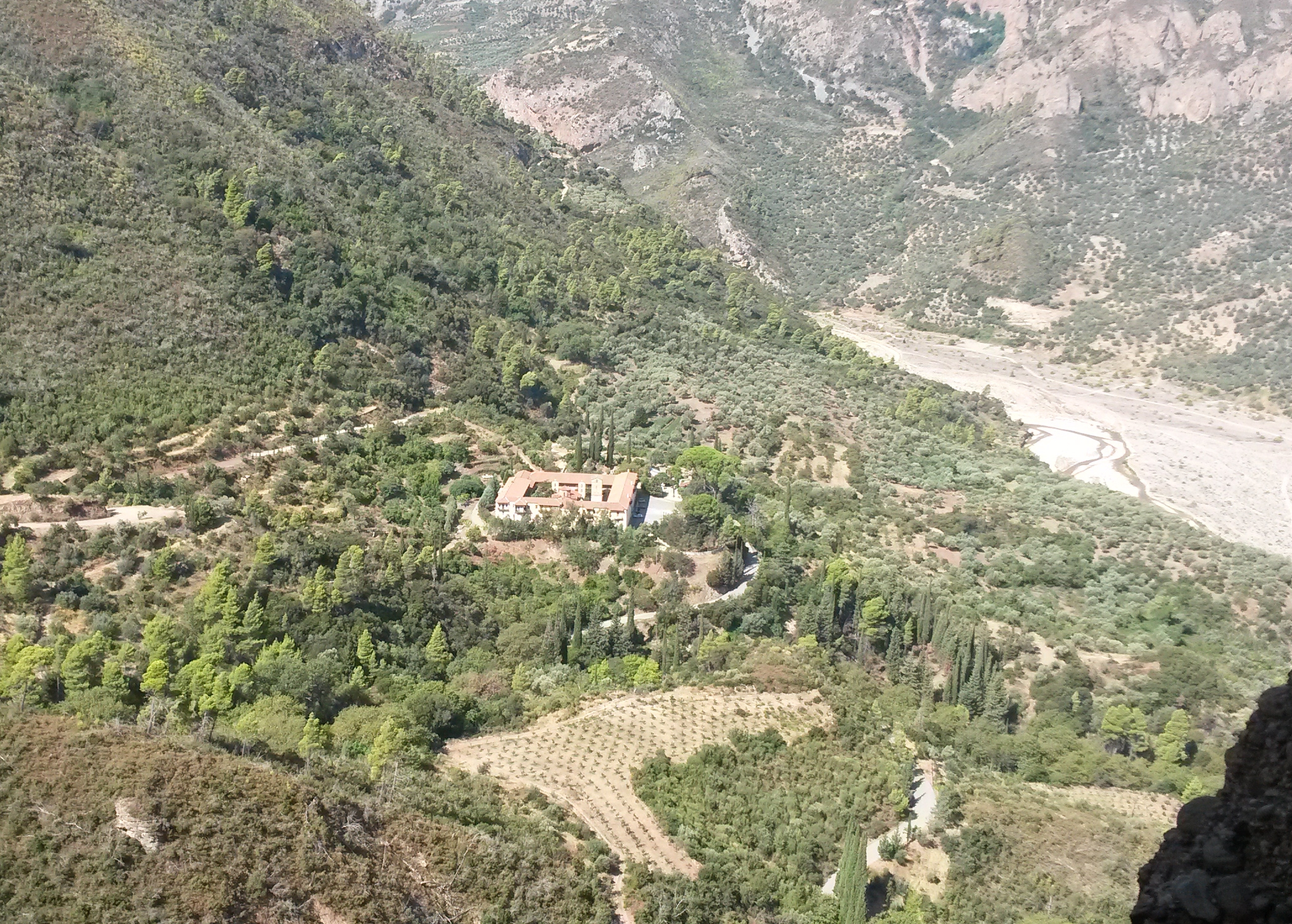
Greek Orthodox Monastery of the Holy Archangels (Pammegiston Taxiarchon), Aigialeia, Greece. View from the rock of the hermitage of Saint Leontius. The Honorable Body of Saint Leontius is kept inside the monastery church.
