= Ahmet the Calligrapher =

Turkish martyr and saint (died 1682)

Saint Ahmet the Calligrapher
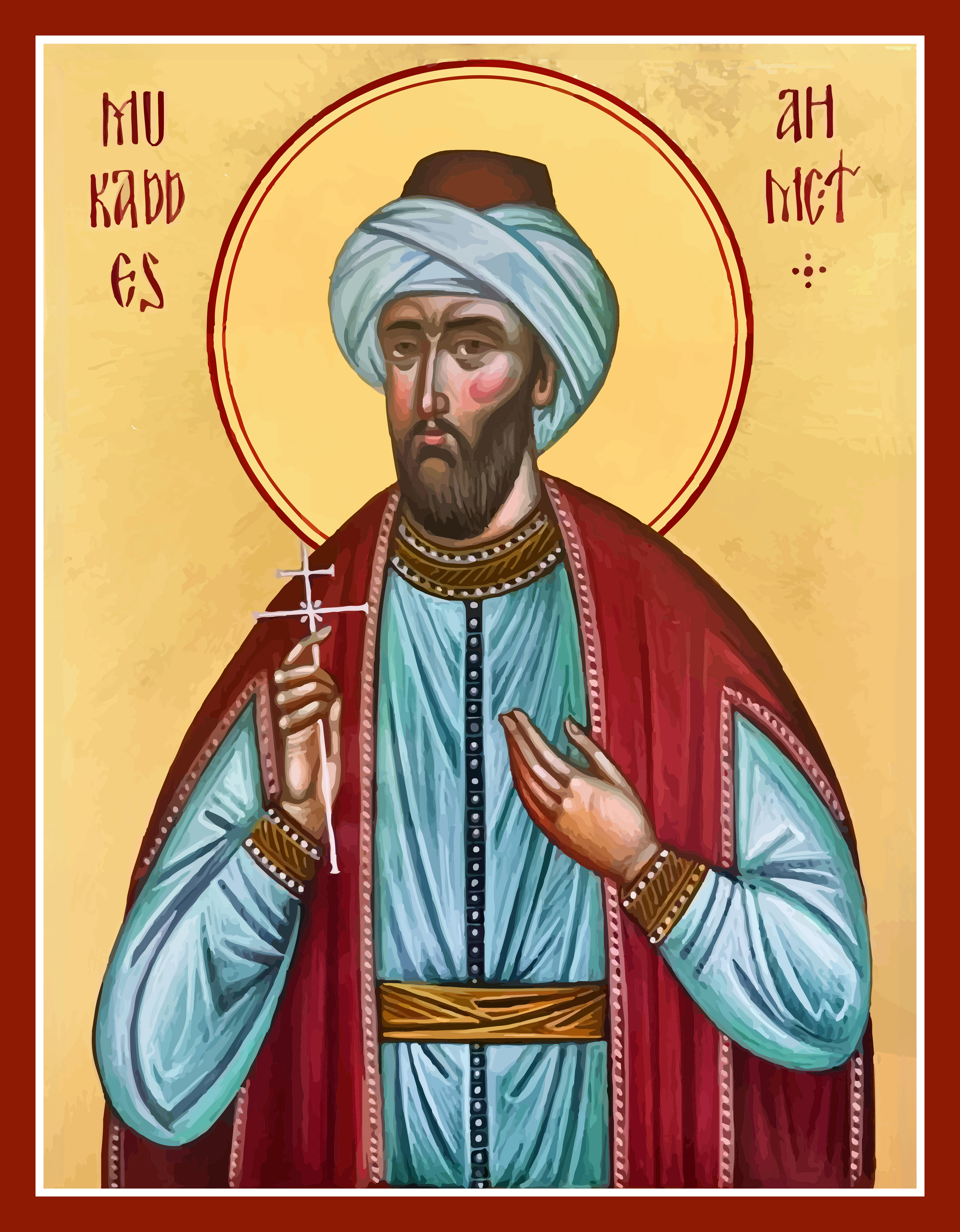
- Icon of Saint Ahmet the Calligrapher
- Born: Constantinople, Ottoman Empire
- Died: 3 May 1682
- Venerated in: Eastern Orthodox Church
- Feast: 24 December (Julian calendar), 3 May

Ahmet the Calligrapher (Turkish: Hattat Ahmet; died 3 May 1682) was an Ottoman Turkish official venerated as a Christian saint. According to Christian sources, he converted to Christianity and was martyred on 3 May 1682; thus, he is commemorated as a martyr on this day. The only mentions of him are in Christian hagiographies.

== Life ==
Ahmet lived in Constantinople during the 1600s and was an official in the Ottoman Turkish government before his conversion.

Ahmet owned two Russian slaves, a concubine and an old woman, whom he allowed to attend one of the Greek Orthodox churches in Constantinople. In time Ahmet began to notice that when his pious Russian slaves returned from church they were far more gracious and loving than they were before going. Intrigued by this, Ahmet obtained permission to attend the Ecumenical Patriarch's celebration of the Divine Liturgy in Constantinople. Due to his status and identity, his request was not refused, and he was given a discreet place at the Church.

During the Divine Liturgy, Ahmet saw that when the Ecumenical Patriarch blessed the faithful with his trikiri and dikiri his fingers 'beamed' light onto the heads of the faithful Christians, but not his own. Amazed by this miracle, Ahmet requested and received Holy Baptism.

Whatever happened during this period, one day a group of arguing officials asked Ahmet for his opinion of their dispute, to which he replied that there is nothing better than the Christian faith.

For this he was put before the Sultan, Mehmed IV, and qadi. After torture and a few chances to return to Islam he was subsequently beheaded on 3 May 1682.

He is celebrated on 24 December/6 January in Eastern Orthodoxy under the name of Christódoulos (Greek: Χριστόδουλος).

== Sources ==
- This article incorporates text from a free content work. Licensed under CC-SA 2.5. Text taken from Ahmed the Calligrapher, Orthodox Wiki, Orthodox Wiki.

== Bibliography ==
- Yurij Maximov, "Svjatye Pravoslavnoj Tcerkvi, obrativshiesja iz islama." Moscow, 2002
- "Hagiographies of the Saints", 24 December, Justin Popović
- "Hagiographies of the Saints", 3 May, Justin Popović
- Ahmed the Calligrapher (ΑΠΟ ΤΟ ΒΙΟ ΤΟΥ AΓΙΟΥ ΑΧΜΕΤ ΤΟΥ ΝΕΟΜΑΡΤΥΡΟΣ.) (in Greek)
- Saint Ahmed the Calphas the Neomartyr (Άγιος Αχμέτ ο Κάλφας ο Νεομάρτυρας) (in Greek)
