= Dedisimedi of Mukhrani =

Georgian noblewoman

Dedisimedi

Princess consort of Samtskhe
- Tenure: c. 1545–1573
- Died: c. 1595
- Spouse: Kaikhosro II Jaqeli (m. 1545; died 1573)
- Issue: Qvarqvare IV; Mzetchabuk; Manuchar II; Ivane-Tvalmshvenieri; Helen; Tamar; Saba-Janko; Basil; Beka-Pavle III
- House: Mukhrani
- Father: Bagrat, Prince of Mukhrani
- Mother: Helen
- Religion: Georgian Orthodox Church

Dedisimedi (Georgian: დედისიმედი; died c. 1595) was a Georgian noblewoman of the House of Mukhrani, a collateral branch of the royal Bagrationi dynasty. She was princess consort of Samtskhe as wife of Kaikhosro II Jaqeli (r. 1545–1573) and regent for her son Qvarqvare IV Jaqeli (r. 1573–1581). She played a leading role in a civil war that plagued Samtskhe from 1576 to 1578. After the Ottoman takeover of her principality, Dedisimedi retired to Kartli, leaving the government to her son, Manuchar II Jaqeli, who continued to rule as an Ottoman pasha.

== Family background and name ==
Dedisimedi was born into the princely family of Mukhrani, the Mukhranbatoni, a collateral branch of the royal house of Kartli. The sources differ as to her parents. The 16th-century Chronicle of Meskhian Psalter as well as the 18th century Georgian historian Prince Vakhushti and a church inscription from Vale suggest that Dedisimedi's father was Bagrat, son of King Constantine II. In contrast, Vakhushti's contemporaneous editor of the Georgian Chronicles, Beri Egnatashvili, makes her, erroneously, daughter of Bagrat's son Ashotan and, hence, sister of Saint Ketevan the Martyr.

As Egnatashvili claims, on her marriage into the Jaqeli family she was given the name Dedisimedi—literally, "a mother's hope"—already known in the family earlier: so was named a consort of Qvarqvare IV Jaqeli, who died in 1489. When relating events in her widowhood, one of the editions of the Georgian Chronicles refers to the dowager princess as "Deborah, formerly Dedisimedi". This gave rise to a hypothesis that, at some point of her life and probably after her husband's death in 1573, Dedisimedi might have become a nun under the name of Deborah. Many modern scholars such as K. Sharashenidze and Sh. Lomsadze have dismissed such a possibility on account of her energetic involvement in war and politics.

== Marriage ==
Dedisimedi married Prince Kaikhosro II Jaqeli, a 22-year-old Atabeg of Samtskhe, in 1545. Kaikhosro's rule over Samtskhe, one of the breakaway states of the Kingdom of Georgia, was marred by incessant Iranian–Ottoman rivalry over the territory, uneasy relations with neighboring Georgian polities, and internecine feuds. Installed through the Ottoman intervention, Kaikhosro ended up his reign, watching the western part of his principality being assimilated by the Ottomans and the eastern moiety—where he preferred to stay—being subjected to Iran. He died while visiting the court of Shah Tahmasp I at Qazvin in 1573.

Not much is known about Dedisimedi's life during the turbulent years of Kaikhosro's rule. In a period of ascendancy of the Muslim empires, she patronized Christianity and rebuilt the Church of Theotokos of Vale in the years of 1561–1563. She is also credited to have been one of the authors of the Chronicle of the Meskhetian Psalter, a fragmented account of the 1561–1587 events in Samtskhe (Meskheti) attached to a Psalter manuscript.

== Regency ==
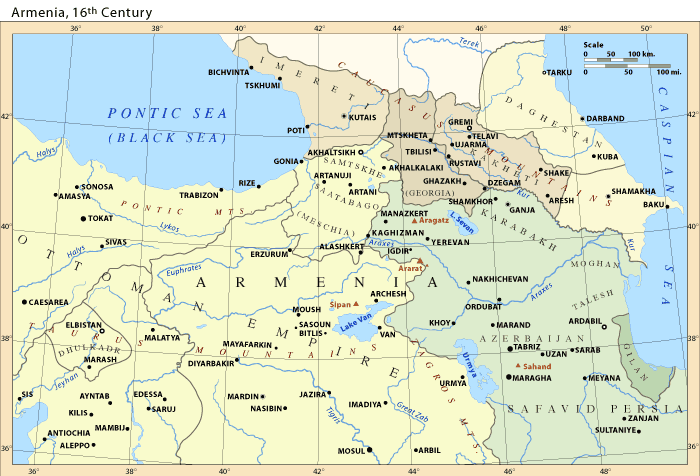
The Caucasus in the 16th century.

On the death of Kaikhosro, Qvarqvare IV, the eldest of his eight children with Dedisimedi, succeeded to the principate of Samtskhe. Since he was still young and inexperienced, the actual government of the country was taken over by Dedisimedi and the nobleman Varaza Shalikashvili, whose sister was a favorite wife in Shah Tahmasp's harem.

In 1574, the Kakhetian nobleman Cholokashvili—in a quest to divert the shah's attention from the affairs of Kakheti—successfully spread rumors to convince Dedisimedi of Shalikashvili's perfidy. The princess dowager—described by the historian Vakhushti as imperious, jealous, and cruel—had Shalikashvili murdered on charges of plotting with the Iranians. Shah Tahmasp reacted to the killing of his brother-in-law and ally by invading Samtskhe. Dedisimedi and her sons were put into flight to the mountains of Adjara and many of their castles were conferred on the murdered Shalikashvili's Islamized son, Kokola (Mahmud Khan). As the shah left, Dedisimedi was able to resume her reign, but an uprising and an attempt on Qvarqvare IV followed. From 1576 through 1578, civil war raged through eastern Samtskhe between the Jaqeli faction and the aristocratic opposition led by Kokola Shalikashvili, leaving towns such as Tmogvi in ruins. Dedisimedi was personally involved in fighting, directing operations at Queli and Tmogvi.

Eventually, the Jaqeli prevailed, but the decimated country became an easy target for the powerful thrust of the Ottoman army under Lala Mustafa Pasha's command in August 1578. The nobles of Samtskhe submitted after a token resistance and Lala Pasha made a common cause with Dedisimedi's more able and calculating son Manuchar, a co-regent with his mother. The Jaqeli accepted Ottoman suzerainty. Lala Pasha met Dedisimedi at her base at Okros Tsikhe (Altunkal'a) and politely made it clear that her elder sons should become Muslims. In 1579, both Qvarqvare and Manuchar repaired to Constantinople and the latter pompously converted to Islam under the name of Mustafa. Following Qvarqvare's death in 1581, Manuchar-Mustafa became an Ottoman governor of a reduced Samtskhe, that is, pasha of Childir.

Dedisimedi left the Ottoman-occupied Samtskhe in 1585 and retired to Akhaldaba, in Kartli, where Manuchar, having revolted from the Ottoman authority, had also taken refuge. Early in 1586, Manuchar acceded to the Ottoman demands and sent Dedisimedi and her grandson, Kaikhosro, son of Qvarqvare IV, to Samtskhe. Thereafter, she disappears from the contemporary historical records, save for the Ottoman fiscal documents of 1595, listing the estates formerly belonging to her in Samtskhe.

== Children ==
Dedisimedi had eight children with Kaikhosro II:

- Qvarqvare IV Jaqeli (c. 1546/47–1581), Atabeg of Samtskhe (r. 1573–1581);
- Mzetchabuk (March 1549 – 11 January 1572), who married Rodam, daughter of George II Gurieli, in 1572;
- Manuchar II Jaqeli (1550–1614), Atabeg of Samtskhe (r. 1581–1614);
- Ivane-Tvalmshvenieri ("the Fair-Eyed");
- Helen (died before 1561);
- Tamar (born 18 April 1561), who married Kaikhosro Oravzhandashvili in 1572, Vakhtang I Gurieli in 1583, and Manuchar I Dadiani in 1592 (or 1598);
- Saba-Janko (29 April 1563 – 20 March 1575);
- Basil (12 August 1564– 3 September 1579), twin brother of Beka-Pavle; he was a monk from childhood;
- Beka-Pavle III Jaqeli (Sefer Pasha) (12 August 1564–1635), twin brother of Basil and Pasha of Childir (1625–1635).
