= Kaikhosro II Jaqeli =

Atabeg of Samtskhe
- Reign: 1545–1573
- Predecessor: Interregnum
- Successor: Qvarqvare IV
- Born: 13 February 1522
- Died: 29 September 1573 (aged 51); Qazvin, Safavid Iran
- Spouse: Dedisimedi of Mukhrani (m. 1545)
- Issue Among others: Qvarqvare IV Jaqeli; Manuchar II Jaqeli; Beka III Jaqeli
- House: Jaqeli
- Father: Qvarqvare III Jaqeli
- Religion: Eastern Orthodox Church

Kaikhosro II Jaqeli (Georgian: ქაიხოსრო II ჯაყელი; 13 February 1522 – 29 September 1573), of the House of Jaqeli, son of Qvarqvare III, was prince of Samtskhe (styled with the hereditary title of atabeg), ruling nominally in 1545–1573. Invested as a puppet ruler by the Ottomans in 1545, Kaikhosro II's tenure was marred by incessant Iranian–Ottoman rivalry, as well as uneasy relations with neighboring Georgian polities, and internecine feuds. The western part of his principality became quickly assimilated by the Ottomans and formed into a paşalık, while the eastern part came under Iranian suzerainty. In 1570, as a result of continued Ottoman aggression, Kaikhosro was forced to seek direct assistance from his suzerain king Tahmasp I (r. 1524–1576) at the Iranian royal court, where he died three years later as well.

== Biography ==
During the first decades of the 16th century, which were marked by political turmoil, the Samtskhe lords found themselves dispossessed of their territories. Kaikhosro, then still an infant, was smuggled by Otar Shalikashvili to the Ottoman court at Istanbul in order to request help to reclaim his principality. In 1536, the Ottoman army came, did nothing to help reinstate the atabeg, but went back with more loot than they could carry. Subsequently, Samtskhe ceased to exist for a period of ten years — all of its lands were divided between Rostom Gurieli, Bagrat III of Imereti, and Luarsab I. At the same time, the Ottomans pursued an active policy of Islamisation in the southwest.

In 1545, during the Ottoman-Safavid War of 1532-155, Samtskhe was under the attack of the main army of then incumbent Ottoman ruler Suleiman the Magnificent (r. 1520–1566). Eventually, the Ottomans, assisted by Otar Shalikashvili, managed to overrun Samtskhe; Kaikhosro II was subsequently invested as a puppet atabeg by the Ottomans. In the same year, Kaikhosro (then aged 22) married Dedisimedi, a Georgian noblewoman of the House of Mukhrani. Ottoman aggression in Samtskhe alarmed Kaikhosro II; he subsequently appealed to then incumbent Iranian Safavid king Tahmasp I to drive the Ottomans off, and to assist him in regaining Javakheti (ever since the Samtskhe principality was disbanded, it had fallen under the rule of Luarsab I). In January 1547, Tahmasp I occupied the town of Akhalkalaki, despite a "severe winter", followed shortly by Javakheti and Lower Kartli. The Iranian army, however, was "decimated" by Luarsab I's mercenaries, and shortly after by those of Bagrat III of Imereti and Levan of Kakheti (who helped Luarsab I). Eventually though, both Bagrat III and Levan were paid off by Tahmasp I.

Later in 1547, when the Ottoman threat flared up again, Tahmasp I summoned the kings of Imereti and Kakheti in order to secure tribute and military support from them. Kaikhosro II ended up watching the western part of his principality being assimilated by the Ottomans and formed into a paşalık, while the eastern moiety—where he preferred to stay—being subjected to Iran. The Ottomans would later periodically raid this eastern part of Samtskhe, which was under Iranian suzerainty; as a result, they managed to drive Kaikhosro in 1570 to the Iranian royal court at Qazvin, where he begged then incumbent king Tahmasp I to intervene. Kaikhosro II died three years later, in 1573, at Qazvin. He was succeeded by the eldest of his eight children with Dedisimedi, known by his dynastic name of Qvarqvare IV. However, since he was still young and inexperienced, the actual government of the country was taken over by his widow Dedisimedi and the nobleman Varaza Shalikashvili, whose sister was a favorite wife in king Tahmasp I's harem.

== Family ==
Kaikhosro II was married to Dedisimedi, daughter of Bagrat, Prince of Mukhrani. Their children were:

- Qvarqvare IV Jaqeli (c. 1546/47–1581), Atabeg of Samtskhe (r. 1573–1581);
- Mzetchabuk (March 1549 – 11 January 1572), who married Rodam, daughter of Rostom Gurieli, in November 1570;
- Manuchar II Jaqeli (1550–1614), Atabeg of Samtskhe (r. 1581–1614);
- Ivane-Tvalmshvenieri ("the Fair-Eyed");
- Helen (died before 1561);
- Tamar (born 18 April 1561), who married Kaikhosro Oravzhandashvili in 1572, Vakhtang I Gurieli in 1583, and Manuchar I Dadiani in 1592 (or 1598);
- Saba-Janko (29 April 1563 – 20 March 1575);
- Basil (12 August 1564– 3 September 1579), twin brother of Beka-Pavle; he was a monk from childhood;
- Beka-Pavle III Jaqeli (Sefer Pasha) (12 August 1564–1635), twin brother of Basil and Pasha of Childir (1625–1635).

== Sources ==
- Mikaberidze, Alexander (2015). Historical Dictionary of Georgia (2 ed.). Rowman & Littlefield. p. 379. ISBN 978-1442241466.
- Rayfield, Donald (2013). Edge of Empires: A History of Georgia. Reaktion Books. ISBN 978-1780230702.
- Sharashidze, Kristine (1961). სამხრეთ საქართველოს ისტორიის მასალები XV–XVI სს [Materials on the History of Southern Georgia, 15th–16th Centuries] (in Georgian). თბილისი: საქართველოს სსრ მეცნიერებათა აკადემია.
- Toumanoff, Cyril (1976). Manuel de Généalogie et de Chronologie pour l'histoire de la Caucasie chrétienne (Arménie, Géorgie, Albanie) [Manual of Genealogy and Chronology of Christian Caucasian History (Armenia, Georgia, Albania)] (in French). Rome: Edizioni Aquila.
- Brosset, Marie-Félicité (1856). Histoire de la Georgie depuis l'antiquite jusqu'au 19. siecle (in French). Vol. 5. l'acad. Imper. des sciences.

Kaikhosro II Jaqeli Jaqeli
Preceded by Qvarqvare III	Atabeg of Samtskhe; 1545-1573	Succeeded by Qvarqvare IV
