= Qvarqvare IV Jaqeli =

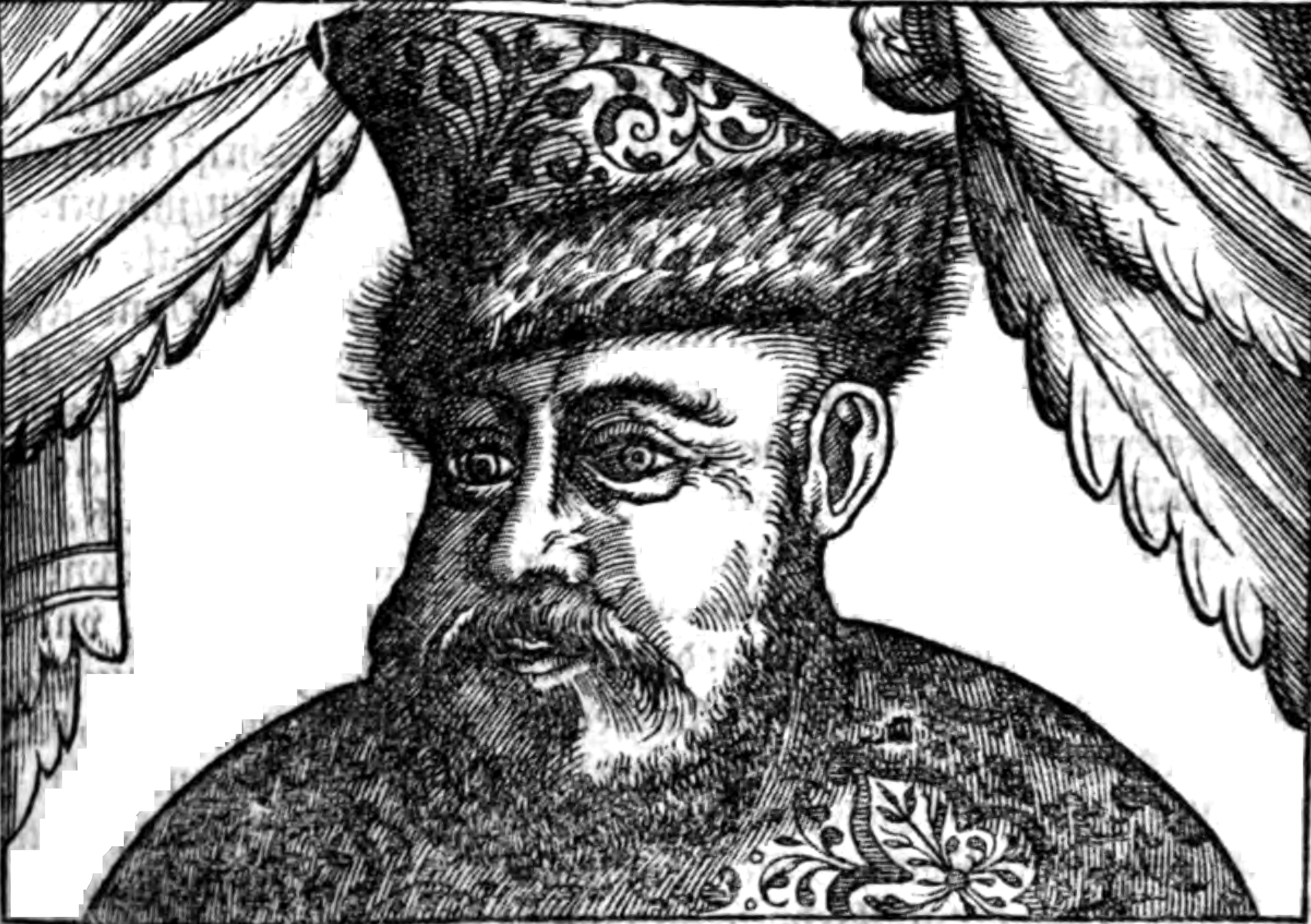
- Portrait of Qvarqvare from the book written by Salomon Schweigger

Atabeg of Samtskhe
- Reign: 1573–1581
- Predecessor: Kaikhosro II
- Successor: Manuchar II
- Regent: Dedisimedi
- Born: c. 1547/48
- Died: 1581
- Spouse: Marekhi Dadiani (m. 1564)
- Issue: Kaikhosro; Tinatin
- Dynasty: Jaqeli
- Father: Kaikhosro II Jaqeli
- Mother: Dedisimedi of Mukhrani
- Religion: Orthodox Christianity

Qvarqvare IV Jaqeli (Georgian: ყვარყვარე IV ჯაყელი; c. 1547/48 – 1581) was a Georgian Prince and Atabeg of Samtskhe-Saatabago, ruling nominally in 1573–1581.

== Biography ==
He was member of the Jaqeli family and the son of Kaikhosro II Jaqeli. During his nominal reign Meskhetian lords revolted several times against Jaqelian rule. Uprisings were suppressed by Ottomans. In 1578 Ottomans started new war against Safavid Persia for the hole territory of Caucasus. Lala Mustafa Pasha invaded Georgia. Qvarqvare IV obeyed him. Pasha had decided to send Qvarqvare and his younger brother Manuchar to Constantinople for recognizing Ottoman absolute rule in Samtskhe. Qvarqvare left the government to his mother, Dedisimedi and went to the capital of the Ottoman Empire. In 1579 by the order of Sultan Murad III Ottomans divided Samtskhe-Saatabago into eight Sanjaks and established Childir Eyalet on the lands of Meskheti. Qvarqvare IV was appointed as Christian ruler of Childir Eyalet, but his brother Manuchar converted to Islam under the name of Mustafa and became the Ottoman Pasha. Qvarqvare died in 1581 and was succeeded by his Muslim brother Manuchar II.

== Family ==
In 1564, Qvarqvare married Marekhi, daughter of Levan I Dadiani, Prince of Mingrelia. After Qvarqvare's death, Marekhi married Levan of Imereti in 1586. Qvarqvare and Marekhi had two children:

- Kaikhosro (born 1573);
- Tinatin (died 1628), who married Mamia II Gurieli, Prince of Guria.

== Sources ==
- Mikaberidze, Alexander (2015). Historical Dictionary of Georgia (2 ed.). Rowman & Littlefield. ISBN 978-1442241466.
- Rayfield, Donald (2013). Edge of Empires: A History of Georgia. Reaktion Books. ISBN 978-1780230702.
- Toumanoff, Cyril (1976). Manuel de Généalogie et de Chronologie pour l'histoire de la Caucasie chrétienne (Arménie, Géorgie, Albanie) [Manual of Genealogy and Chronology of Christian Caucasian History (Armenia, Georgia, Albania)] (in French). Rome: Edizioni Aquila.

Qvarqvare IV Jaqeli Jaqeli
Preceded by Kaikosro II	Prince of Meskheti; 1573-1581	Succeeded by Manuchar II
