= Tsriokhi =

Former Village in present-day Akhaltsikhe Municipality

Sanakanape Fortress

Tsriokhi (Georgian: წრიოხი) was a village in present-day Akhaltsikhe Municipality, in the Samtskhe–Javakheti region of Georgia. The village was depopulated following the 1944 deportation of Muslims from the Meskheti region and was officially abolished by a decree issued in 1949.

== History ==
The name Tsriokhi (წრიოხი) means "barren" in Georgian. The area in which Tsriokhi was located, a Georgian settlement, came under Ottoman rule in 1578. In the Ottoman detailed tax register of 1595, the village is recorded as "Ziriokh" (زيريوخ). At that time, it consisted of 15 Christian households. The heads of households liable for taxation bore Georgian names, including Enuka, Makhara, Vardzel, Gvinia and Gogicha. Wheat, barley, rye, millet and lentils were cultivated in the village, while beekeeping and viticulture were also practised. Sheep and pigs were raised, and the village had one watermill.

Tsriokhi came under the control of the Russian Empire following the Russo-Turkish War of 1828–1829. Under the Treaty of Adrianople, signed between the Ottoman Empire and Russia at the end of the war, the village was situated in an area where a population exchange based on religious affiliation was envisaged. Nevertheless, the village appears to have remained inhabited. In a demographic and ethnic survey conducted by the Tiflis Governorate in 1870, the village was recorded as "Tsrioh" (Цріохъ). It was located in Akhaltsikhe Uyezd, within the Tiflis Governorate of the Russian Empire. Its population consisted of 220 people living in 32 households, including 106 men and 114 women. The inhabitants were recorded as Sunni Georgians. The village had an old Orthodox church, a mosque and a ruined fortress called Sakanape (საკანაფე).

The village was also recorded as "Tsriokh" (Цріохъ) in the 1886 Russian census. At that time, it was part of the Atskuri uchastok of Akhaltsikhe Uyezd. According to the census, it had 51 households and a population of 364, comprising 185 men and 179 women. The inhabitants were again recorded as Georgians.

During the 1930s, Tsriokhi was part of the Atskuri village soviet in Akhaltsikhe District. In 1944, its inhabitants were deported to Central Asia. On 2 August 1949, the village was officially abolished by a decision of the Supreme Soviet of the Georgian SSR, on the grounds that its inhabitants had moved elsewhere. On 2 August 1949, the village of Oskeria was abolished on the grounds that its inhabitants had moved elsewhere.

The Sanakanape Fortress, located in the former village area, survives in a ruined state. The fortress is also mentioned in the 1595 Ottoman detailed register.
