= Church of Theotokos of Vale =

Church of Theotokos of Vale ვალეს ღვთისმშობლის ეკლესია (in Georgian)
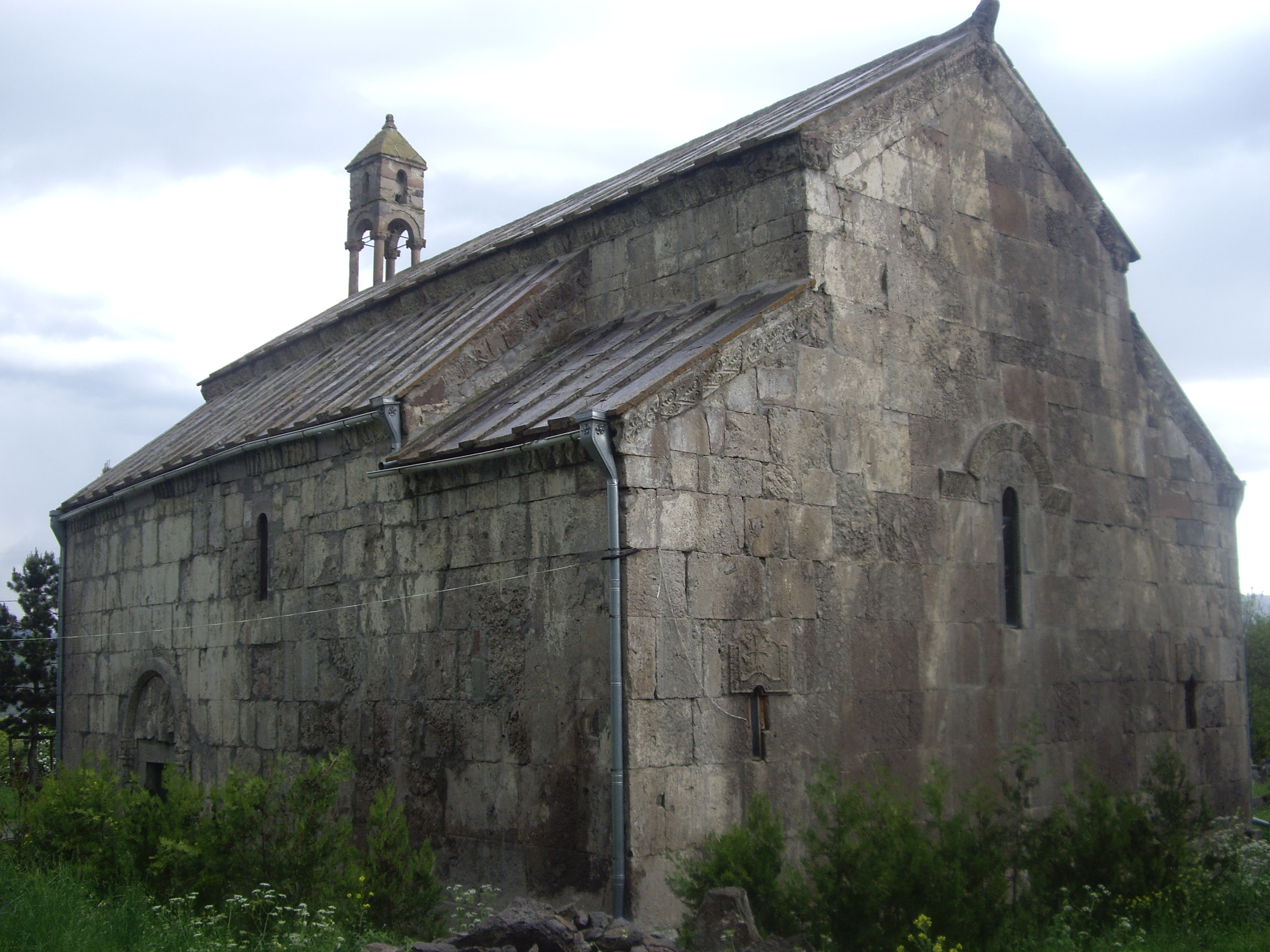
- Church of the Theotokos of Vale

- Location within Samtskhe-Javakheti Location within Georgia

Religion
- Affiliation: Georgian Orthodox
- Province: Samtskhe–Javakheti

Location
- Location: (Georgia (country)) Samtskhe–Javakheti, Georgia
- Interactive map of Church of Theotokos of Vale ვალეს ღვთისმშობლის ეკლესია (in Georgian)
- Coordinates: 41°36′59″N 42°51′59″E

Architecture
- Type: Church
- Completed: 16th century

The Church of the Theotokos of Vale (Georgian: ვალეს ღვთისმშობლის ეკლესია, vales ghvtismshoblis eklesia) is a medieval Georgian Orthodox church at the town of Vale in the Samtskhe-Javakheti region in the south of Georgia, built in honor of the Theotokos (St. Mary).

== History ==
The extant edifice is a 16th-century monument, a three-nave basilica, a result of remodeling of an earlier, late-10th-century domed church, of which parts of lavish decor such as relief sculptures of laymen, clergy, and equestrian saints as well as cornices and window frames survive. The naves are separated by two pairs of arches. A bell-tower on the roof is an 18th or 19th-century addition. A 16th-century Georgian inscription on the pylon in Asomtavruli script reveals that the church was built de novo in 1561-1564 by Dedisimedi, princess-consort of the Principality of Samtskhe, of which Vale was part.

The church has three entrances and windows at each side. The facades are clad with ashlars, originally remaining on the western and eastern walls. Decorations are found above each window of the eastern facade, and around the entrances. The western portal is framed with columns and arches. Its architrave stones presumably depict St. George and St. Demetrius, with ornamentation above them. The tympanum of the southern entrance contains relief of the Christ with presumably the donator. Above them, depictions of equestrians and women. The northern facade has a relief with lions. Numerous reliefs with animals and angels can also be found on the cornice.
