= Beka III Jaqeli =

Pasha of Childir
- Reign: 1625–1635
- Predecessor: Manuchar III
- Successor: Yusuf I
- Born: 12 August 1564
- Died: 1635 (aged 70–71)
- Issue: Yusuf I Jaqeli
- House: Jaqeli
- Father: Kaikhosro II Jaqeli
- Mother: Dedisimedi of Mukhrani
- Religion: Islam (formerly Georgian Orthodox Church)

Beka III Jaqeli (Georgian: ბექა III ჯაყელი; 12 August 1564 — 1635), also known by his second name Pavle (Georgian: პავლე) and later as Sefer Pasha (Georgian: საფარ ფაშა; Turkish: Sefer Paşa), was a Georgian Pasha of Childir Eyalet from 1625 to 1635.

== Biography ==
Beka was born on 12 August 1564, his second name was Pavle, and he and his twin brother, Basil, were the youngest children of Kaikhosro II Jaqeli and Dedisimedi of Mukhrani. Basil had been a monk since childhood and died in 1579.

Beka came to power after poisoning his nephew Manuchar III, the last Christian ruler of Samtskhe-Saatabago, which was then fully incorporated as the Childir Eyalet. After this, Beka III went to Istanbul, to the court of Sultan Murad IV. He converted to Islam, a prerequisite for the position, called himself Sefer Pasha and returned to the Childir Eyalet. His conversion and rule as Pasha solidified Ottoman control and accelerated the process of Islamization in the region of Samtskhe. Sefer Pasha died in 1635 and was succeeded by his son, Yusuf I, as Pasha of Childir.

== Sources ==
- Mikaberidze, Alexander (2015). Historical Dictionary of Georgia (2 ed.). Rowman & Littlefield. ISBN 978-1442241466.
- Rayfield, Donald (2012). Edge of Empires: A History of Georgia. Reaktion Books. ISBN 978-1780230702.
- Sharashidze, Kristine (1961). სამხრეთ საქართველოს ისტორიის მასალები XV–XVI სს [Materials on the History of Southern Georgia, 15th–16th Centuries] (in Georgian). თბილისი: საქართველოს სსრ მეცნიერებათა აკადემია.

Beka III Jaqeli Jaqeli
Preceded by Atabeg of Samtskhe; Manuchar III	Pasha of Childir; 1625–1635	Succeeded by Pasha of Childir; Yusuf I
