= Yusuf I Jaqeli =

Pasha of Childir
- Reign: 1635–1647
- Predecessor: Beka III Jaqeli (Sefer Pasha)
- Successor: Rostom Pasha
- Died: 1647
- Issue: Rostom Pasha Jaqeli
- House: Jaqeli
- Father: Beka III Jaqeli
- Religion: Islam

Yusuf I Jaqeli, also known as Yusuf Pasha (Georgian: იუსუფ I ჯაყელი; Turkish: Yusuf Paşa; died 1647) was a Georgian ruler of Childir Eyalet and vassal of the Ottoman Empire from 1635 to 1647, member of the Jaqeli family and the son of Beka III Jaqeli, better known as "Sefer Pasha". In 1635, after his father's death Ottomans guaranteed Jaqeli family the Meskhetian throne, if they convert to Islam. Yusuf with his family and relatives became Muslim and started ruling Childir. He took appearance in the Ottoman-Safavid war. In 1647 Yusuf I died by unknown illness, leaving the throne to his son, Rostom.

== Sources ==
- Mikaberidze, Alexander (2015). Historical Dictionary of Georgia (2 ed.). Rowman & Littlefield. ISBN 978-1442241466.
- Rayfield, Donald (2013). Edge of Empires: A History of Georgia. Reaktion Books. ISBN 978-1780230702.

Yusuf I Jaqeli Jaqeli
Preceded by Beka III Jaqeli	Pasha of Childir; 1635–1647	Succeeded by Rostom Pasha
