= Kvetera Church =

Church in Kvetera, Georgia

Kvetera Church კვეტერის ეკლესია
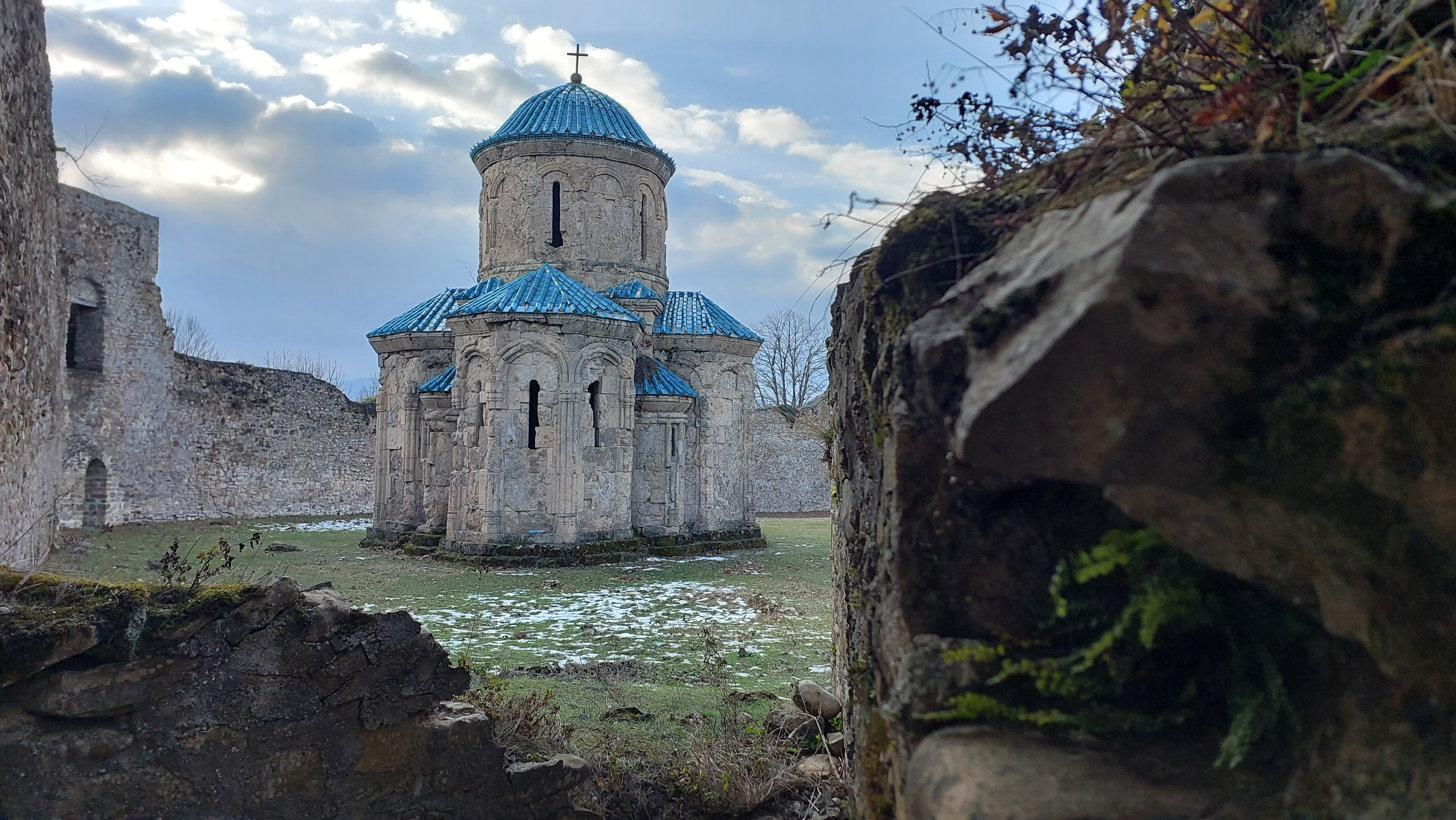
- Kvetera Church

- Location within Georgia

Religion
- Affiliation: Georgian Orthodox Church
- Region: Caucasus
- Status: Abandoned

Location
- Location: Approximately a 1.5 km from the hamlets of Vedzebi, Naduknari, Sabue, and 9 km from Akhmeta, Kakheti Province (Mkhare), Georgia
- Coordinates: 42.0561°N 45.0994°E

Architecture
- Type: Domed radial tetraconch plan
- Style: Georgian; Church
- Completed: Early 10th century
- Dome: 1

Kvetera Church (Georgian: კვეტერის ეკლესია, romanized: k'vet'eris ek'lesia) is a Georgian Orthodox church in a historic fortified town of Kvetera in Kakheti.

Kvetera Church was built in the early part of the 10th century. It is a relatively small church and resembles the Georgian cross-dome style of architecture. The dome rests on a round tympanum and rises over the central square pace. The Projections end in an apse, which have niches between them. The facade of the church is not designed with many ornaments which is typical for Kakhetian churches. Most of the facade is decorated with symmetrical arches.

Kvetera used to be one of the centers of the Principality of Kakheti. According to Prince Vakhushti of Kartli, Kvetera dates back at least to the 8th century AD. It is also mentioned in a written document from the 11th century.

== Gallery ==
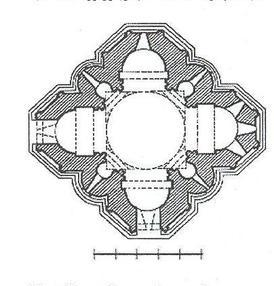
Plan of the church

Church and fortified walls.

== See also ==
- Tsinandali
- Gremi
