= Kakhetian pig =

Breed of pig

Kakhetian
- Other names: Georgian: კახური, kakhuri
- Country of origin: Georgia
- Distribution: Kakheti

Traits

The Kakhetian pig (Georgian: კახური ღორი, romanized: k'akhuri ghori) is a local pig breed from Kakheti, the eastern province of Georgia.

== Overview ==
Kakhetian pig is one of the oldest sorts of European origin, which was received in the nomadic conditions as the result of European wild pig domestication, with the national selection. Herd uses well forest fruits, pastures and seed cultures. It is black, sometimes dark grey or reddish. The sucking pigs are stripy like their wild ancestors. The stripes at the age of 3 months disappear. More often it has straight and coarse bristle, sometimes curly. Its fuzz is well developed. This sort is characterized by a medium-size long head, well developed moving snout and short standing ears. It has a flat, narrow, enough deep and short body, convex back, tall and strong legs, indrawn and short stomach, underdeveloped udder, the number of nipples -10-12. The prompt mass of the male is 100-120kg. and of female – 60-80kg. Meat quality is high. The pure weight of lean meat is 63-65%, of fat – 20-21%. Such composition of meat and fat is desirable for specialized bacon sorts. Kakheti pig is preserved only in the mountainous zone of East Georgia, where nomadic pig breeding is extended most of all. Its productivity is 6-8 sucking pigs. The pregnant pigs sometimes disappear in the forest to born their sucking pigs and after birth, they return to the herd. Rarely they don’t return and become wild. Kakheti pig is pure sort due to immunogenetical investigation. The same data are given by learning the construction of the cranium. Phenotype and genotype data directly prove their origin from their wild ancestors.
