= Manuchar II Jaqeli =

Prince of Samtskhe

Atabeg of Samtskhe
- Reign: 1581–1607
- Predecessor: Qvarqvare IV Jaqeli
- Successor: Manuchar III Jaqeli
- Born: 1550
- Died: 1614 (aged 63–64)
- Spouse: Helen of Kartli
- Issue: Manuchar III Jaqeli; Tinatin
- Dynasty: Jaqeli
- Father: Kaikhosro II Jaqeli
- Mother: Dedisimedi of Mukhrani
- Religion: Orthodox Christianity

Manuchar II Jaqeli (Georgian: მანუჩარ II ჯაყელი; 1550 – 1614), of the House of Jaqeli, was prince of Samtskhe (styled with the hereditary title of atabeg) and the pasha of its capital Akhaltsikhe from 1581 to 1607 (de facto only up to 1587). Later, when he was removed from power by the Ottomans, he fled to Safavid Iran, where he served at the Safavid court until his death, and continued to claim the title of atabeg of Samtskhe.

== Biography ==
Manuchar was the son of Kaikhosro II Jaqeli by his wife Dedisimedi of Mukhrani, and served as the regent of Samtskhe between 1576 and 1578. He was married to a daughter of Simon I of Kartli, named Helen (fl. 1583–1609). During his regency, he sided with the Ottomans. Manuchar II was present at the Battle of Çıldır, where he watched the Ottomans win from a nearby mountaintop. After the battle ended, Manuchar descended, and handed over the keys of the nearby castles, while at the same time he looked on the thousands of captured men of the combined Safavid-Georgian army being executed on the spot. Subsequently, the Ottomans took the rest of Samtskhe, and divided it into eight sanjaks. Manuchar II was appointed head of one these sanjaks, that of Khakhuli.

Later, when the Ottomans found themselves stalled in Kartli due to the fierce resistance of Simon I (Shahnavaz Khan), Manuchar and the rest of his family were brought to Erzurum by Lala Mustafa Pasha. There, Manuchar offered the Ottomans his support if they were to take Shirvan, as long as Samtskhe would be kept semi-autonomous. The Ottomans however refused, and appointed Manuchar's brother Kvarkvare IV as the new atabeg of Samtskhe. Manuchar subsequently travelled to the Ottoman court in Istanbul, converted to Islam, adopted the name Mustafa, and was appointed pasha of Akhaltsikhe in 1579 by the Ottomans, though he was not yet in control of it. In 1581, he drove his older brother Qvarqvare IV away, who had been ruling Samtskhe as a puppet of his "imperious" mother Dedisimedi since his father's death in 1573, and ruled eastern Samtskhe as pasha of Childir.

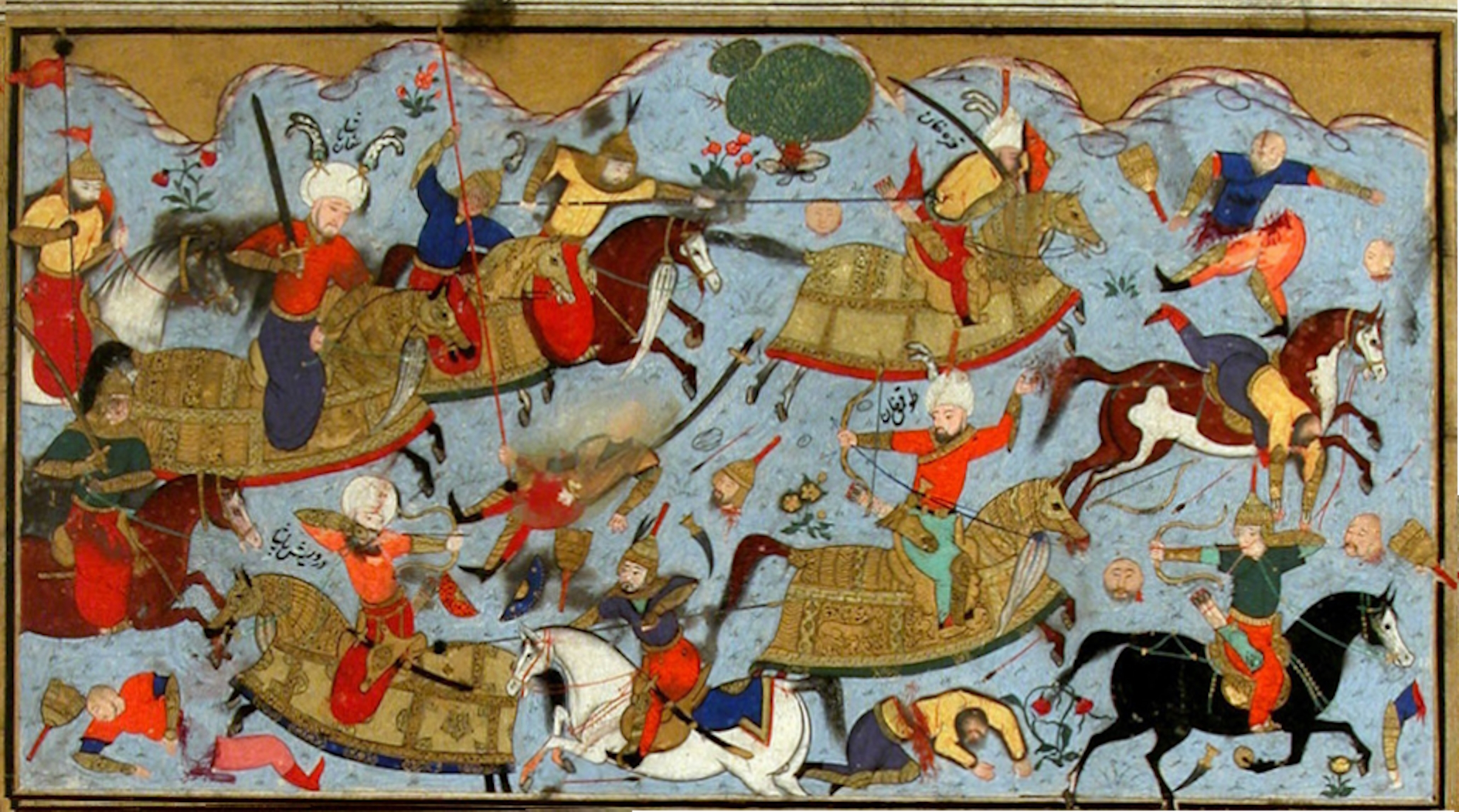
Manuchar II attended the Battle of Çıldır between Ottomans and Safavids (and fellow Georgians) from a nearby mountaintop during the Ottoman–Safavid War (1578–1590).

Even though Manuchar, now known as Mustafa Pasha, chose to support the Ottomans, he had a double agenda, and maintained secret communications with the Georgian nobility, and especially with Simon I, who, after his initial struggle against Safavid Iran, actively fought against the Ottoman encroachment and expansion in Georgia. At the Mukhrani Field, an Ottoman force aided by Manuchar as well as men from Guria, Mingrelia and Imereti, fought the Safavid-Georgian force of Simon I and Ali-Qoli Khan, and were defeated. Manuchar was subsequently blamed for the catastrophe, and a military council discussed the option of having him executed. Aware of the dangerous situation, Manuchar got involved in a deadly skirmish while asking for new orders in the tent of the pasha of Tbilisi, who had taken refuge in Samtskhe. The pasha was badly wounded, and the Ottomans retreated from Samtskhe to Kars shortly after. Manuchar subsequently renounced Islam and joined Simon I's anti-Ottoman efforts. Dismayed, the Ottomans appointed another Muslim Georgian to rule Samtskhe, but soon after the Ottoman sultan sent apologies to Manuchar, and re-confirmed him as atabeg in 1582, which he were to stay till 1585. In the ensuing years, Manuchar assisted Simon in several battles against the Turks, including the battle near the Khrami river.

In 1587, the Ottoman sultan planned to deal once and for all with the issue related to Simon I and Manuchar II of Samtskhe; one of his armies took Akhaltsikhe, which Manuchar was unable to defeat. Manuchar subsequently fled to Iran, where he served at the Safavid court until his death in 1614. In 1590, in order to buy time, the Safavids decided to recognize all of Georgia as an Ottoman possession, which therefore also sealed Samtskhe's fate for the time being. When in 1608 Luarsab II of Kartli gained the Iranian approval to attack the Ottomans in Samtskhe, the war was prompted by Manuchar II's wife Helen. She hoped to see her son become the next atabeg of Samtskhe, with Iranian and Kartlian help. This would eventually be accomplished, and their son succeeded as Manuchar III.

== Family ==
Manuchar II Jaqeli married Helen (fl. 1583–1609), daughter of Simon I of Kartli, on 24 March 1583. They had two children:

- Manuchar III Jaqeli (1591–1625), last Atabeg of Samtskhe from 1607 to 1625;
- Tinatin (died 1610), who married Rostom of Imereti in 1597.

== Sources ==
- Mikaberidze, Alexander (2015). Historical Dictionary of Georgia (2 ed.). Rowman & Littlefield. ISBN 978-1442241466.
- Papuashvili, Tamar (10 December 2020). "The Childiri Battle According To Şecâ'atnâme" (PDF). 2nd Intertational Conference on Research in Social Sciences and Humanities: 55. doi:10.33422/2nd.icrsh.2020.12.08.
- Rayfield, Donald (2012). Edge of Empires: A History of Georgia. Reaktion Books. ISBN 978-1780230702.
- Toumanoff, Cyril (1976). Manuel de Généalogie et de Chronologie pour l'histoire de la Caucasie chrétienne (Arménie, Géorgie, Albanie) [Manual of Genealogy and Chronology of Christian Caucasian History (Armenia, Georgia, Albania)] (in French). Rome: Edizioni Aquila.

Manuchar II Jaqeli Jaqeli
Preceded by Qvarqvare IV	Prince of Meskheti; 1581-1607	Succeeded by Manuchar III
