= Manuchar III Jaqeli =

Atabeg of Samtskhe
- Reign: 1607–1625
- Predecessor: Manuchar II
- Successor: Beka III (Sefer Pasha)
- Born: 1591
- Died: 1625 (aged 33–34)
- Dynasty: Jaqeli
- Father: Manuchar II Jaqeli
- Mother: Princess Helen of Kartli
- Religion: Orthodox Christianity

Manuchar III Jaqeli (Georgian: მანუჩარ III ჯაყელი; 1591–1625), of the House of Jaqeli, was the last atabeg of the principality of Samtskhe, nominally ruling between 1607 and 1625.

== Biography ==
Manuchar was the son of Manuchar II Jaqeli and his wife, Helen, daughter of Simon I of Kartli. As a child, he accompanied his father, Manuchar II Jaqeli, when the latter settled at the Safavid Iranian court, then located at Qazvin. Later, when the Iranian royal court had already been moved to Isfahan, his mother Helen had been making efforts in order for her son to be able to succeed as the next atabeg. She discussed the matter at court with then incumbent Safavid Shah Abbas I (r. 1587–1529), Alexander II of Kakheti, as well as the Portuguese diplomat Antonio de Gouvea. With Manuchar III living at the court, Helen herself received "virtually nothing" from Abbas I, although she had offered him sovereignty over Samtskhe.

Having been confirmed in 1607 as ruler of Samtskhe by Abbas I, Manuchar III continued to fight the Ottomans in a similar fashion to his father. However, he ceased his activities in 1608, when due to the circumstances, he was forced to flee to Kartli. Following his father's death in 1614, Manuchar III now officially claimed the title of atabeg of Samtskhe and made active efforts to incite anti-Ottoman sentiments in the area. Later, in 1624, he battled against the Ottoman pasha of Erzurum; shortly after, he moved to Kartli once again. There, he supported Giorgi Saakadze against the Iranians, and was reputable at the Battle of Marabda. In 1625, he resumed relations with the Ottomans, who subsequently confirmed him as atabeg of Samtskhe; when he actually returned to Samtskhe however, he was killed (poisoned) by his own uncle Beka Jaqeli, better known as Sefer Pasha.

Manuchar III was the last Christian ruler of Samtskhe; upon his death in 1625, the Ottomans completely incorporated the western part of the principality of Samtskhe as a pashalik. In 1639, by the Treaty of Zuhab, they also gained the eastern part, which had been under Safavid control. The members of the House of Jaqeli, who had been at the head of the principality for centuries, converted to Islam, and remained in power as hereditary pashas in the Ottoman service.

== Sources ==
- Floor, Willem (2001). Safavid Government Institutions. Costa Mesa, California: Mazda Publishers. ISBN 978-1568591353.
- Mikaberidze, Alexander (2015). Historical Dictionary of Georgia (2 ed.). Rowman & Littlefield. ISBN 978-1442241466.
- Rayfield, Donald (2012). Edge of Empires: A History of Georgia. Reaktion Books. ISBN 978-1780230702.
- Suny, Ronald Grigor (1994). The Making of the Georgian Nation. Indiana University Press. ISBN 978-0253209153.

Manuchar III Jaqeli Jaqeli
Preceded by Manuchar II	Prince of Meskheti; 1607-1625	Succeeded by Pasha of Childir; Beka III (Sapar Pasha)
