= Vale, Georgia =

Vale ვალე
- Town
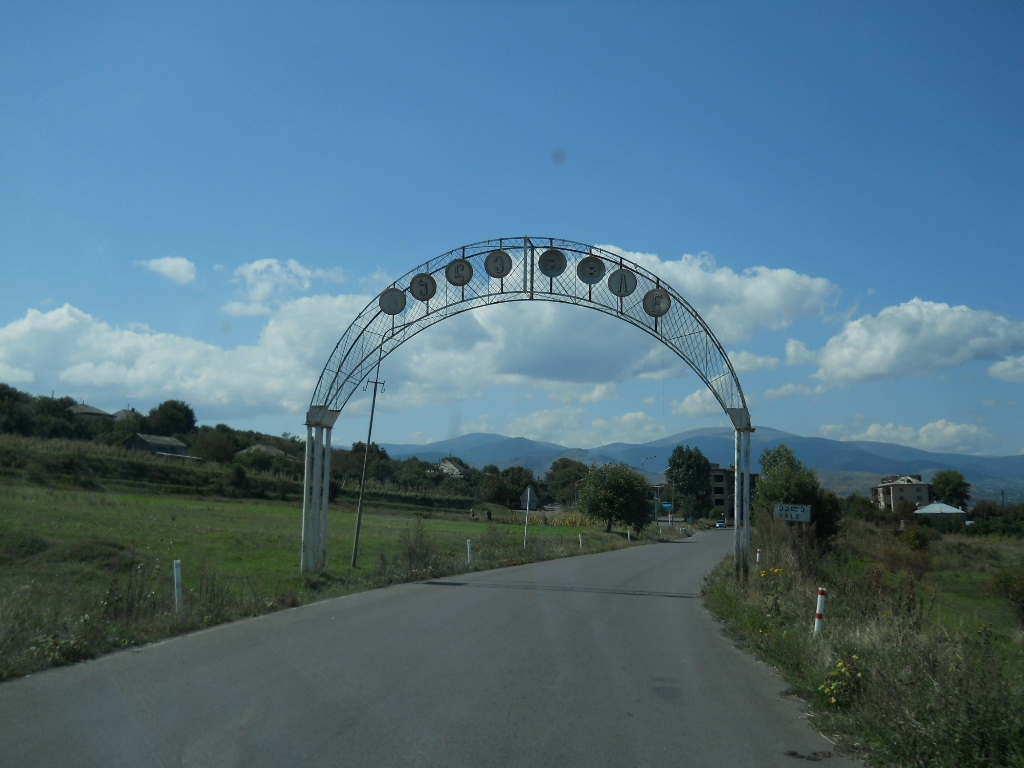

- Location within Georgia Location within Samtskhe-Javakheti
- Coordinates: 41°37′0″N 42°52′40″E
- Country: Georgia (country)
- Mkhare: Samtskhe-Javakheti
- District: Akhaltsikhe

Population (2024)
  - Total: 5,019
- Time zone: UTC+4 (Georgian Time)

Vale (Georgian: ვალე) is a town in southwestern Georgia, 12 km (7 mi) from the city of Akhaltsikhe, Samtskhe-Javakheti region, at the border with Turkey. According to the 2014 census it has a population of 3,646. Vale is a border crossing point into the Turkish village of Türkgözü, in Posof district.

The town is situated on the right bank of the Potskhovi River (a tributary to the Mtkvari), on the slopes of the Lesser Caucasus at 1,000-1,200 m above sea level.

Vale is first recorded as a village in the 10th century. It emerged as a center of lignite industry in the Soviet era and acquired town status in 1962.

Vale houses a medieval Georgian Church of the Theotokos originally built in the 10th century, but reconstructed as a three nave basilica in the 16th century. The town is a home to a sizable Armeno-Georgian Catholic community.

== See also ==
- Samtskhe-Javakheti
