= Okros Tsikhe =

- ოქროს ციხე
- Adigeni Municipality, Samtskhe-Javakheti, Georgia
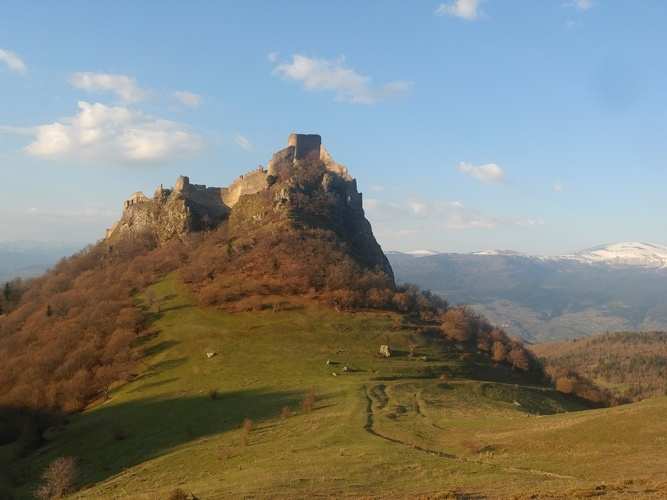
- Okros Tsikhe

Site information
- Type: Fortress

Location
- Coordinates: 41.708438°N 42.762623°E

Immovable Cultural Monument of National Significance of Georgia
- Official name: Okros Tsikhe
- Designated: November 7, 2006; 19 years ago
- Reference no.: 293
- Item Number in Cultural Heritage Portal: 9079
- Date of entry in the registry: October 3, 2007; 18 years ago

Okros Tsikhe (Georgian: ოქროს ციხე, literally, "the golden fortress") is a medieval fortress in the Adigeni Municipality, in Georgia's southern region of Samtskhe-Javakheti, north of the village of Shoqa. It is located in the historical Kvabliani valley, on an inaccessible rocky mount. The fortress featured prominently in the Georgian–Ottoman encounters of the 16th century and was also known by the Turkish equivalent of its name, Altunkal'a. In 2007, Okros Tsikhe was inscribed on the list of Georgia's Immovable Cultural Monuments of National Significance.

== Architecture ==
The Okros Tsikhe fortress is one of the largest medieval fortifications in Georgia. Its thick walls are built of massive crudely trimmed blocks of stone, standing to a height of 10 meters. The citadel tops a rocky ridge of the mount and its ramparts—reinforced with large towers—steeply descent on both southern and northern slopes. Its plan is complex, with several levels following the irregular rocky surface and artificial walls blending with the rocky wall.

== History ==
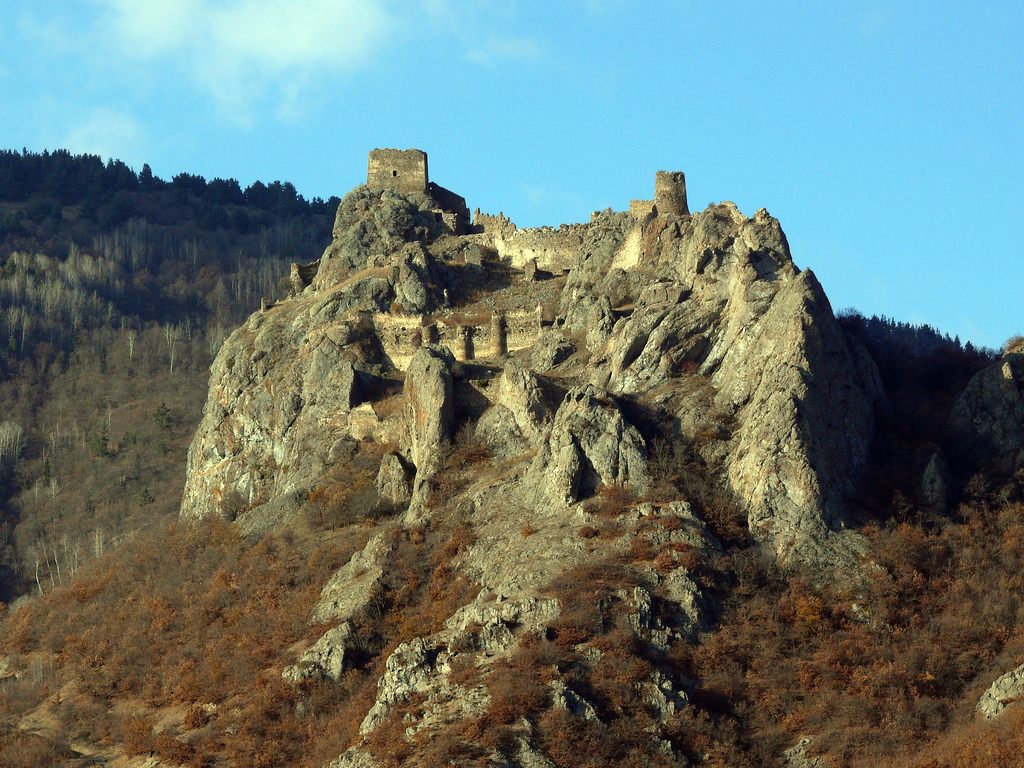
Hind view of Okros fortress and the surrounding cliffs.

The Okros Tsikhe fortress was built in the late 13th or early 14th century and was one of the principal fortifications in possession of the Jaqeli dynasty of the Principality of Samtskhe. Owing to its dominant position in the Kvabliani valley, the fortress played a prominent role in the defense of Samtskhe against the invading Ottoman army during Lala Mustafa Pasha's Caucasian campaign in 1578. It was where the princess Dedisimedi had entrenched herself before negotiating a peace agreement with the Ottoman commander. After the final Ottoman conquest of the province, the fortress was known by its Turkish name, Altunkal'a, and served as the center of the homonymous district (liva). It served as a functional fortification till the end of the 18th century.
