= Childir Eyalet =

Administrative division of the Ottoman Empire from 1578 to 1845

Eyālet-i Čildir
- Eyalet of the Ottoman Empire
- 1578–1845
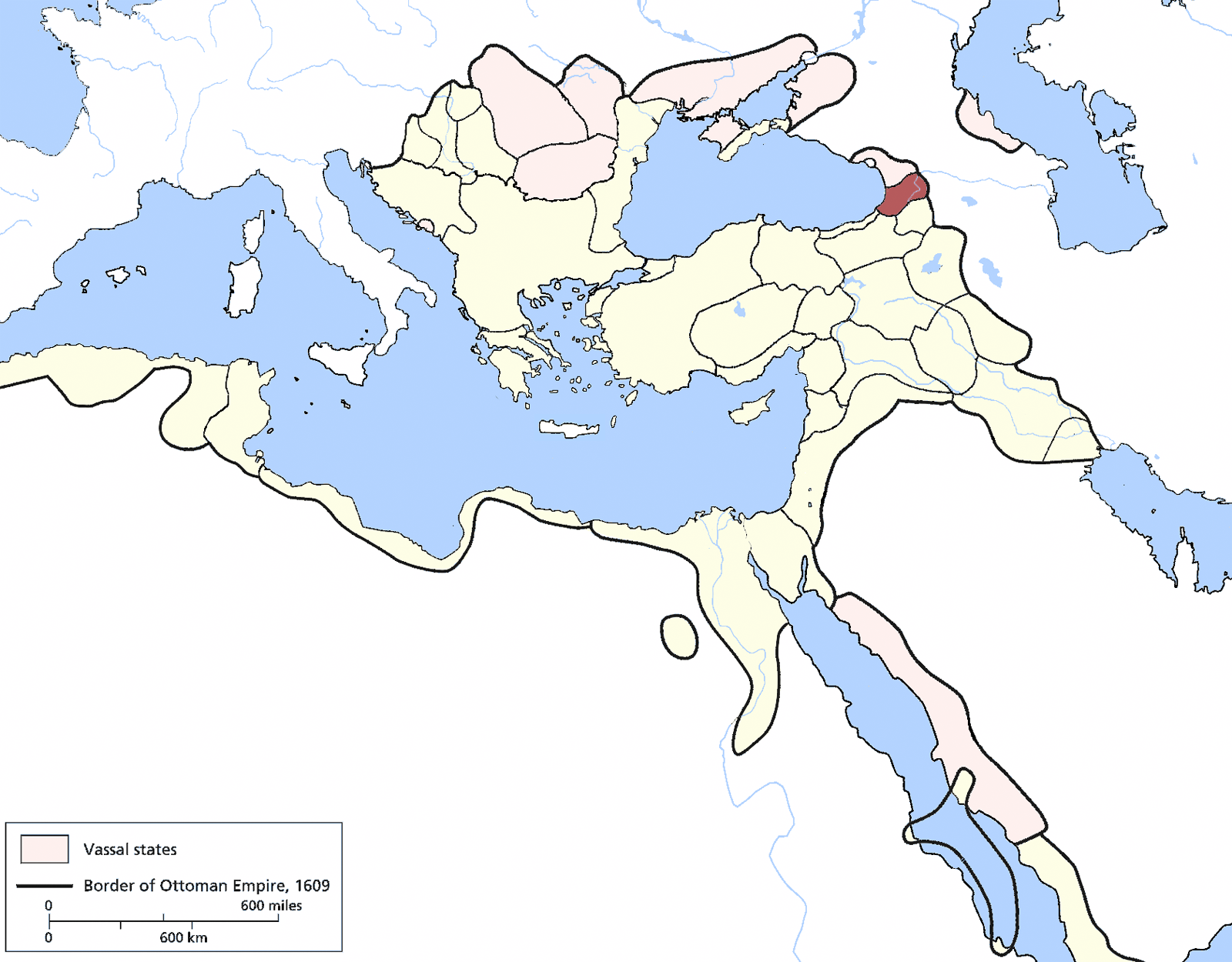
- The Childir Eyalet in 1609
- Capital: Çıldır 1578–1628; Ahıska 1628-1829; Oltu 1829-1845
- History
  - Battle of Çıldır: 1578
  - Disestablished: 1845
Preceded by
Principality of Guria
Principality of Meskheti
Succeeded by
Trabzon Eyalet
Kars Eyalet
Tiflis Governorate
- Today part of: Georgia; Turkey

The Eyalet of Childir (Ottoman Turkish: ایالت چلدر, romanized: Eyālet-i Çıldır) or Akhalzik (Note: Other variants of this name include Akalzike (from Malthe Conrad Bruun (1822). Universal geography, or A description of all the parts of the world. p. 121.)) was an eyalet of the Ottoman Empire in the Southwestern Caucasus. The area of the former Çıldır Eyalet is now divided between Samtskhe-Javakheti and the Autonomous Republic of Adjara in Georgia and provinces of Artvin, Ardahan and Erzurum in Turkey. The administrative center was Çıldır between 1578 and 1628, Ahıska between 1628 and 1829, and Oltu between 1829 and 1845.

== History ==
Samtskhe was the only Georgian principality to permanently become an Ottoman province (as the eyalet of Cildir). In the eighty years after the Battle of Zivin, the region was gradually absorbed into the empire.

The Ottomans took the Ahıska region from the Principality of Meskheti, a vassal state of Safavid dynasty. In 1578, when the new province was established, they appointed the former Georgian prince, Minuchir (who took the name of Mustafa after converting to Islam) as the first governor. This eyalet expanded after taking the Adjara region from the Principality of Guria in 1582. From 1625 onwards the entire eyalet was a hereditary possession of the now-Muslim Jaqeli atabegs of Samtskhe, which administered it as hereditary governors, with some exceptions, until the mid-18th century. After 1639, the Jaqeli Pashas of Childir were charged with reining in the kings of Imereti.

During the Russo-Turkish War (1828–1829), Russians occupied much of the province. The administrative centre was moved from Akhaltsikhe, which was ceded to Russia, to Oltu.

By the Treaty of Adrianople, much of the pashalik was ceded to Russia, and became part of the Russian Akhalzik uezd (district) of Kutaisi Governorate. The remaining, smaller inner part was united with the eyalet of Kars (later part of Eyalet of Erzurum) in 1845 and its coastal areas were united with Trabzon Eyalet in 1829.

== Governors ==
- 1579 - 1582: Manuchar II Jaqeli (Mustafa Pasha)
- 1582 - 1585: Hüsrev Pasha
- 1585 - c.1596: Ahmed Pasha
- c.1596 - 1603: Hızır Pasha
- 1603 - 1614: Karakash Ahmed Pasha
- 1614 - 1625: Manuchar III Jaqeli (son of Manuchar II)
- 1625 - 1635: Beka III Jaqeli (Sefer Pasha, brother of Manuchar II)
- 1635 - 1647: Yusuf Pasha (son of Sefer Pasha)
- 1647 - 1659: Rüstem Pasha (son of Yusuf Pasha)
- 1659 - 1679: Arslan Mehmed Pasha (son of Yusuf Pasha)
- 1679 - 1690: Yusuf II (son of Arslan)
- 1690 - 1701: Selim Pasha (son of Arslan)
- 1701 - 1722: Ishak Pasha (son of Yusuf II)
- 1722 - 1725: Şehsuvarzade Mehmed Pasha
- 1725 - 1732: Ishak Pasha (again)
- 1732 - 1744: Yusuf III (son of Ishak)
- 1744 - 1748: Ishak Pasha (again)
- 1748 - 1759: Haji Ahmed Pasha (son of Ishak)
- 29 December 1759 - 24 January 1761: Vezir Ibrahim Pasha
- 25 January 1761 - 9 March 1767: Hasan Pasha (son of Yusuf III)
- 10 March 1767 - 27 October 1767: Silahdar İbrahim Bey
- 28 October 1767 - 24 June 1770: Vezir Seyyid Numan Pasha
- 25 June 1770 - 4 January 1771: Vezir Mehmed Pasha
- 5 January 1771 - 18 January 1790: Suleyman Pasha (grandson of Ishak Pasha)
- 9 April 1791 - 10 August 1792: Ishak II, who oversaw the completion of the Ishak Pasha Palace (son of Hasan Pasha)
- 11 August 1792 - 21 July 1796: Mehmed Şerif Pasha (son of Suleyman Pasha)
- 22 July 1796 - 13 January 1797: Kör Yusuf Ziyaüddin Pasha
- 14 January 1797 – 1801: Mehmet Sabit Pasha (son of Hasan Pasha)
- 1801 - 1 November 1802: Mehmed Şerif Pasha (again)
- 1802 - 1809: Selim Khimshiashvili (Selim Pasha)
- 1810 - 1811: Mehmed Şerif Pasha (again)
- 1811 - June 1815: Selim Pasha (again)
- 3 September 1816 - 25 April 1818: Lütfullah Pasha
- 26 April 1818 - March 1821: Benderli Ali Pasha
- March 1821 - April 1824: Seyyid Ahmed Pasha
- April 1824 - 14 February 1825: Haji Salih Pasha
- 15 February 1825 – 1829: Kadirzade Osman Pasha

== Administrative divisions ==
Sanjaks of the Eyalet in the 17th century:

1. Sanjak of Oulti (Oltu)
2. Sanjak of Harbus
3. Sanjak of Ardinj (Ardanuç)
4. Sanjak of Hajrek (Hanak)
5. Sanjak of Great Ardehan
6. Sanjak of Postkhu
7. Sanjak of Mahjil (Macahel)
8. Sanjak of Ijareh-penbek
- Hereditary sanjaks:
1. Sanjak of Purtekrek (Yusufeli)
2. Sanjak of Lawaneh (Livane/Artvin)
3. Sanjak of Nusuf Awan
4. Sanjak of Shushad (Şavşat)

Sanjaks of Childir Eyalet in 1682-1702

1. Sanjak of Nısf-ı Livâne and Pertekrek
2. Sanjak of Oltı
3. Sanjak of Ardanuc
4. Sanjak of Şavşad
5. Sanjak of Pertekrek
6. Sanjak of Great Ardahan
7. Sanjak of Nısf-ı Livâne
8. Sanjak of Mahcil
9. Sanjak of Petek
10. Sanjak of Upper Adjara
11. Sanjak of Lower Adjara
12. Sanjak of Emir Hoy
13. Sanjak of Astere
14. Sanjak of Posthov
15. Sanjak of Hartus
16. Sanjak of Altun Kale
17. Sanjak of Astıha
18. Sanjak of Çıldır
19. Sanjak of Ahalkelek
20. Sanjak of Keskim
21. Sanjak of Hacerek
22. Sanjak of Adjara

Sanjaks between 1721 and 1740:

1. Sanjak of Nısf-ı Livâne and Pertekrek
2. Sanjak of Oltı
3. Sanjak of Şavşad
4. Sanjak of Pertekrek
5. Sanjak of Great Ardahan
6. Sanjak of Mahcil
7. Sanjak of Upper Adjara
8. Sanjak of Emir Hoy
9. Sanjak of Posthov
10. Sanjak of Hartus
11. Sanjak of Altun Kale
12. Sanjak of Astıha
13. Sanjak of Mamervan
14. Sanjak of Çıldır
15. Sanjak of Ahalkelek

== See also ==
- Jaqeli
- Meskhetian Turks
