= Ivane II Jaqeli =

Atabeg of Samtskhe
- Reign: 1391–1444
- Predecessor: Beka II; Aghbugha I
- Successor: Aghbugha II
- Born: 1370
- Died: 1444 (aged 73–74)
- Issue: Aghbugha II Jaqeli; Qvarqvare II Jaqeli
- Dynasty: Jaqeli
- Father: Beka II Jaqeli
- Religion: Orthodox Christianity

Ivane II Jaqeli (Georgian: ივანე II ჯაყელი) (1370 – 1444) was a Georgian prince (mtavari) and longest-reigning Atabeg of Samtskhe from 1391 to 1444. His father was Beka II, the great-grandson of Beka I Jaqeli. In 1395, after Aghbugha I's death, Ivane took absolute power. Ivane was an energetic ruler. In 1390s he was fighting against Tamerlane to defend Meskhetian lands, but in 1400 economically weakened Ivane surrendered to the Turco-Mongolian forces. In early 1410s Ivane created separatist factions against Bagrationi dynasty. He wanted to gain independence for the Meskhetian church, but faced opposition of Georgian clergy. In 1414 King Alexander I had defeated Ivane II at the battle of Aspindza. Atabeg was captured by royal servants. By the order of King he committed the oath of allegiance and returned to his throne. In his last years elderly Ivane had left most of the powers of Principality in the hands of his two sons, Aghbugha and Qvarqvare.

Ivane II Jaqeli Jaqeli
Preceded by Beka II and Aghbugha I	Prince of Meskheti; 1391-1444	Succeeded by Aghbugha II
