= Zarzma Monastery =

Orthodox Christian monastery in Zarzma, Georgia

Zarzma Monastery of Transfiguration Georgian: ზარზმის მონასტერი
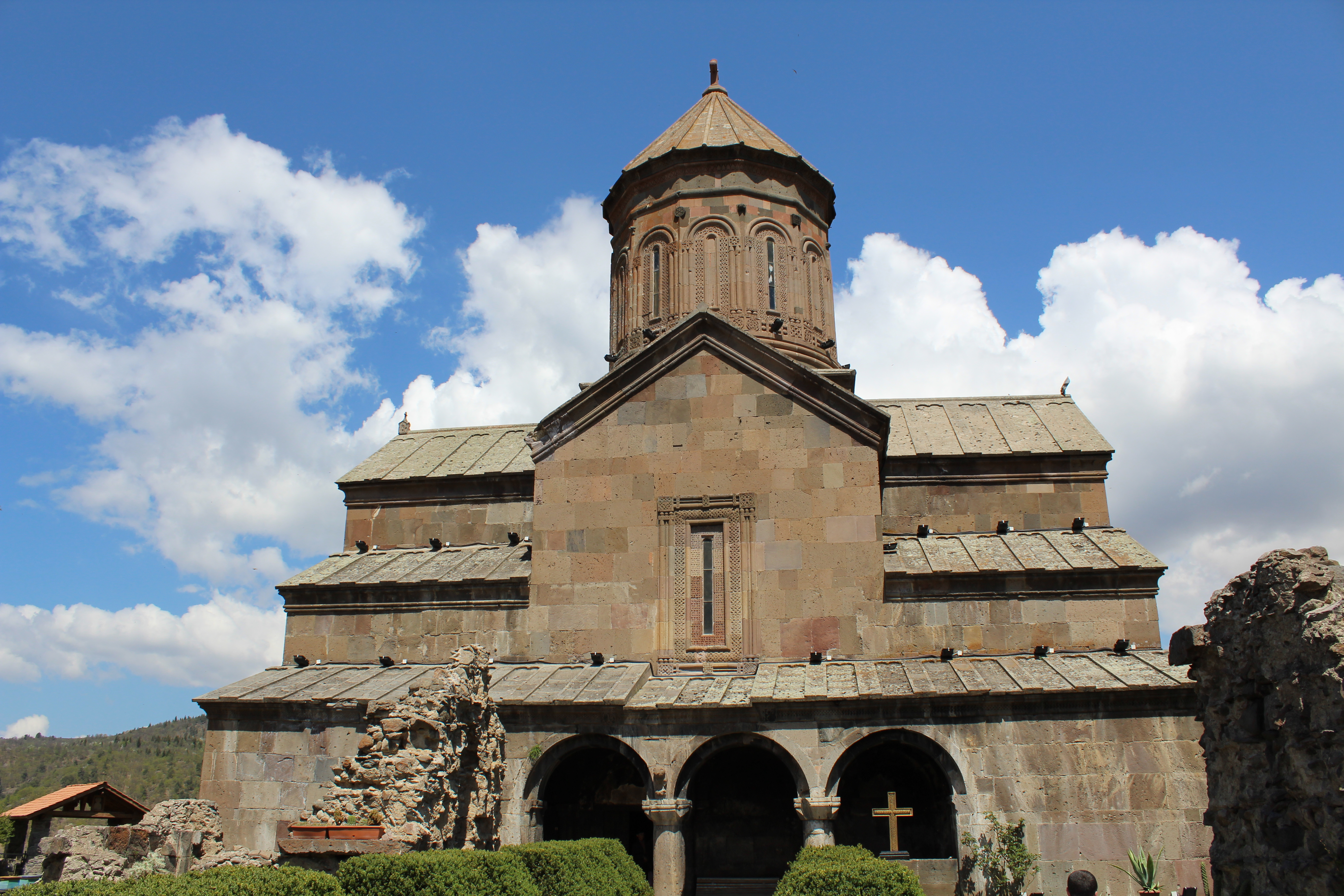
- The monastic church of Transfiguration at Zarzma

- Location within Georgia Location within Samtskhe-Javakheti

Religion
- Affiliation: Georgian Orthodox Church

Location
- Location: village of Zarzma in Adigeni Municipality, Samtskhe-Javakheti region, Georgia
- Coordinates: 41°40′47″N 42°39′14″E

Architecture
- Type: Church
- Style: cross-in-square
- Completed: Church: 8th century, renovated 14th century.
- Dome: 1
- Immovable Cultural Monument of National Significance of Georgia
- Official name: Zarzma Monastery
- Designated: November 7, 2006; 19 years ago
- Reference no.: 265
- Item Number in Cultural Heritage Portal: 24646
- Date of entry in the registry: October 3, 2007; 18 years ago

The Zarzma Monastery of Transfiguration (Georgian: ზარზმის მონასტერი, zarzmis p'erists'valebis monasteri) is a medieval Orthodox Christian monastery located at the village of Zarzma in Samtskhe-Javakheti region, southwest Georgia.

The Zarzma Monastery is nested in the forested river valley of Kvabliani and its tributary Dzindze in the Adigeni municipality, 30 km west of the city of Akhaltsikhe. It is the complex of a series of buildings dominated by a domed church and a belfry, one of the largest in Georgia.

== History ==
The earliest church on the site was probably built in the 8th century (6th or 7th century in other sources), by the monk Serapion of Zarzma whose life is related in the hagiographic novel by Serapion's pupil, Basil of Zarzma. According to his source, the great nobleman Giorgi Chorchaneli made significant donation – including villages and estates – to the monastery. It is said that the monastery main church was built by architect Garbaneli. The extant edifice dates from the early years of the 14th century, however. Its construction was sponsored by Beka I, Prince of Samtskhe and Lord High Mandator of Georgia of the Jaqeli family. The bell tower is from the same period. What has survived from the earlier monastery is the late 10th-century Georgian inscription inserted in the chapel's entrance arch. The inscription reports the military aid rendered by Georgian nobles to the Byzantine emperor Basil II against the rebellious general Bardas Sclerus in 979. In 1544, the new patrons of the monastery – the Khursidze family – refurnished the monastery. In 1577 they also transformed the bell tower, which became a church. The murals suffered significant destruction during the Ottoman rule.

After the Ottoman conquest of the area later in the 16th century, the monastery was abandoned and lay in disrepair until the end of the 19th – beginning of 20th century, when it was reconstructed by the architect and artist duet V.F. Svin'in and A.S. Slavtsev, but some of the unique characteristics of the design were lost in the process.

Currently, the monastery is functional and houses a community of Georgian monks. It is also the site of pilgrimage and tourism.

== Architecture ==
The monastery complex is dominated by the main church. In addition it contains the bell tower from the southwest, with a chapel, four smaller churches from the east, north and south of the main church.

The main church has the cross-in-square plan. It has two entrances, southern, with portal, and western. The portal is unusually stretched along the wall. The dome tholobate contains twelve windows, half of them false, as common at that time. Another interesting feature can be seen on the interior pillars. Their moulding is made of baguettes, separated by horizontal stripes. The western choirs are false, decorative.

The walls are covered in rectangular quadras. The façades of the church are polychromous, as typical for the period, richly decorated and the interior is frescoed. The exterior decorations, again as typical for the 14th century churches, are made around the doors and windows. The dominant motif is cross. Especially richly decorated is the eastern façade.

Apart from the religious cycles of the murals there are a series of portraits of the 14th-century Jaqeli family as well as of the historical figures of the 16th century. The lower southern wall includes: Sargis I, Beka I, Sargis II, Qvarqvare I. On the northern wall are depicted Bagrat III of Imereti, Serapion Khurtsisdze, Georgi Chorchaneli, two unknown persons named Arab and Kurtsik, and Simon Gurieli of Svaneti. Catholicos Eufime is depicted in front of the Christ.

A smaller replica of the Zarzma church, known as Akhali Zarzma ("New Zarzma") is located in the same municipality, near Abastumani. It was commissioned by Grand Duke George Alexandrovich, a member of the Russian imperial family, from the Tbilisi-based architect Otto Jacob Simons who built it between 1899 and 1902, marrying a medieval Georgian design with the contemporaneous architectural forms. Its interior was frescoed by the Russian painter Mikhail Nesterov.

The bell tower originally was part of the fortification wall, and its ground floor served as entrance to the monastery. The upper floor is an octagon with eight arches. It holds the belfry.

Other churches belong to the hall type.

== See also ==
- Chulevi Monastery
- Sapara Monastery
