= Beka II Jaqeli =

Atabeg of Samtskhe
- Reign: 1361–1391
- Predecessor: Qvarqvare I
- Successor: Shalva; Aghbugha I Ivane II
- Born: 1332
- Died: 1391 (aged 58–59)
- Issue: Ivane II Jaqeli
- Dynasty: Jaqeli
- Father: Qvarqvare I Jaqeli
- Religion: Orthodox Christianity

Beka II Jaqeli (Georgian: ბექა II ჯაყელი) (1332 – 1391) was a Georgian prince (mtavari) and ruler of Samtskhe from 1361 to 1391. He was appointed as Atabeg by his paternal relative, Georgian king Bagrat V. From 1372 he ruled Meskheti with his brother Shalva. Shalva died in 1389 and was replaced by his son, Aghbugha I. Beka II's authority in Samtskhe was lost during Timur's invasion of Georgia. After Timur's devastating campaigns, Beka II turned away from king Bagrat and surrendered to the enemy. He died in 1391, leaving Atabeg's throne to his son, Ivane, who shared power with Aghbugha until 1395. The Jaqeli dynasty lasted via Beka II's descendants.

Beka II Jaqeli Jaqeli
Preceded by Qvarqvare I	Prince of Meskheti; 1361-1391	Succeeded by Shalva, Aghbugha I and Ivane II
