= Aghbugha I Jaqeli =

Yaresan

Atabeg of Samtskhe
- Reign: 1389–1395
- Predecessor: Beka II; Shalva
- Successor: Ivane II
- Born: 1356
- Died: 1395
- Dynasty: Jaqeli
- Father: Shalva Jaqeli
- Religion: Orthodox Christianity

Aghbugha I Jaqeli (Georgian: აღბუღა I ჯაყელი) (1356–1395) was a Georgian prince (mtavari) and Atabeg of Samtskhe from 1389 to 1395. Aghbugha was a Son of Prince Shalva. After his father's death Aghbugha was appointed as a co-ruler (he ruled with his uncle Beka II) of Meskheti by Georgian king Bagrat V. During 1381–1386 he renewed The book of laws which was established by his Great-great-grandfather, Beka Jaqeli. This book firstly was called "Aghbugha's law", then "Book of laws set by Beka-Aghbugha".

Aghbugha I Jaqeli Jaqeli
Preceded by Beka II and Shalva	Prince of Meskheti; 1389-1395	Succeeded by Ivane II
