= Aghbugha II Jaqeli =

Atabeg of Samtskhe
- Reign: 1444–1451
- Predecessor: Ivane II
- Successor: Qvarqvare II
- Born: 1407
- Died: 1451 (aged 43–44)
- Dynasty: Jaqeli
- Father: Ivane II Jaqeli
- Religion: Orthodox Christianity

Aghbugha II Jaqeli (Georgian: აღბუღა II ჯაყელი; 1407–1451) was a Georgian prince (mtavari) and Atabeg of Samtskhe from 1444 to 1451. He was a member of Jaqeli family, son of the energetic and separatist ruler Ivane II Jaqeli. In 1444, after his father's death Aghbugha was appointed as Atabeg by Georgian king Vakhtang IV, son of Alexander I The Great. Aghbugha's reign lasted for only 7 years. In this period He was fighting against his rebellious and arrogant brother Qvarqvare. In 1447 Aghbugha asked George VIII for help. Georgian king conducted military campaign against Qvarqvare, defeated and imprisoned him. After this Aghbugha reinstated power. He died in 1451 and was succeeded by his brother Qvarqvare II as the new atabeg.

Aghbugha II Jaqeli Jaqeli
Preceded by Ivane II	Prince of Meskheti; 1444-1451	Succeeded by Qvarqvare II
