= Sargis II Jaqeli =

Georgian prince

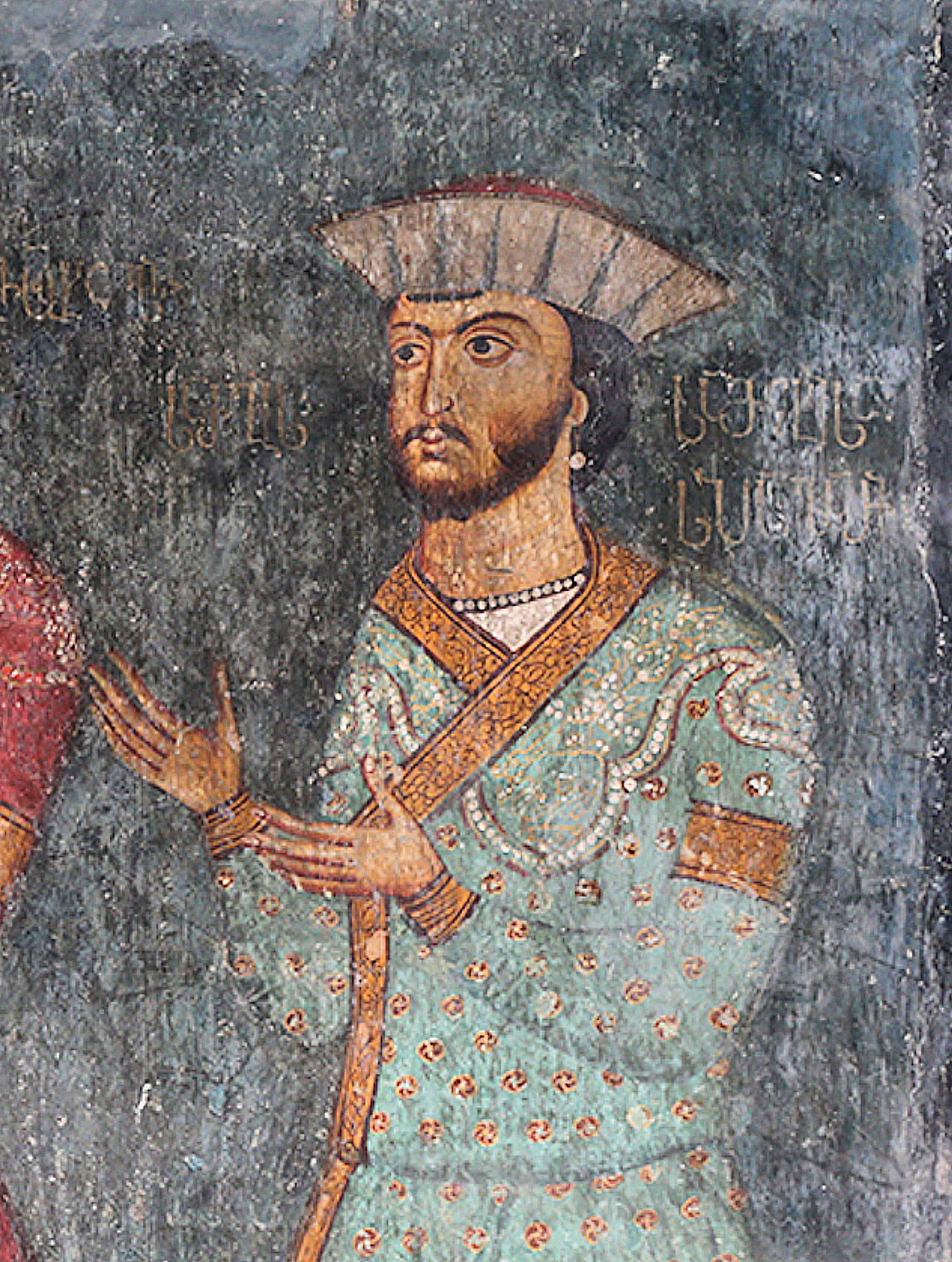
- Fresco of Sargis II Jaqeli from the Sapara Monastery.

Atabeg of Samtskhe
- Reign: 1308–1334
- Predecessor: Beka I
- Successor: Qvarqvare I
- Born: 1271
- Died: 1334 (aged 62–63)
- Issue: Qvarqvare I Jaqeli
- Dynasty: Jaqeli
- Father: Beka I Jaqeli
- Religion: Orthodox Christianity

Sargis II Jaqeli (Georgian: სარგის II ჯაყელი) (1271 – 1334) was a Georgian prince (mtavari) and ruler of Principality of Samtskhe from 1308 to 1334.

== Biography ==
He was a son of Prince Beka I Jaqeli. During his father's reign Sargis participated in many campaigns. In 1290s Azat Mousa, leader of the Anatolian Turkoman tribes, attacked Samtskhe. Beka Jaqeli appointed Sargis as a commander of army and ordered him to stop Turks near village Vashlovani. Around 1303, Sargis defeated Turkoman tribes and expelled them from Meskhetian lands.

In 1308, after his father's death, Sargis ascended the Atabeg's throne. He was made Amirspasalar and Atabeg of the Kingdom of Georgia by his nephew, King George V "the Brilliant". After Sargis II's death, his son Qvarqvare became a new Prince of Meskheti, also the vassal of Georgian kingdom.

Sargis II Jaqeli Jaqeli
| Preceded by Beka I | Prince of Meskheti; 1308-1334 | Succeeded by Qvarqvare I |
