= Qvarqvare I Jaqeli =

Georgian prince

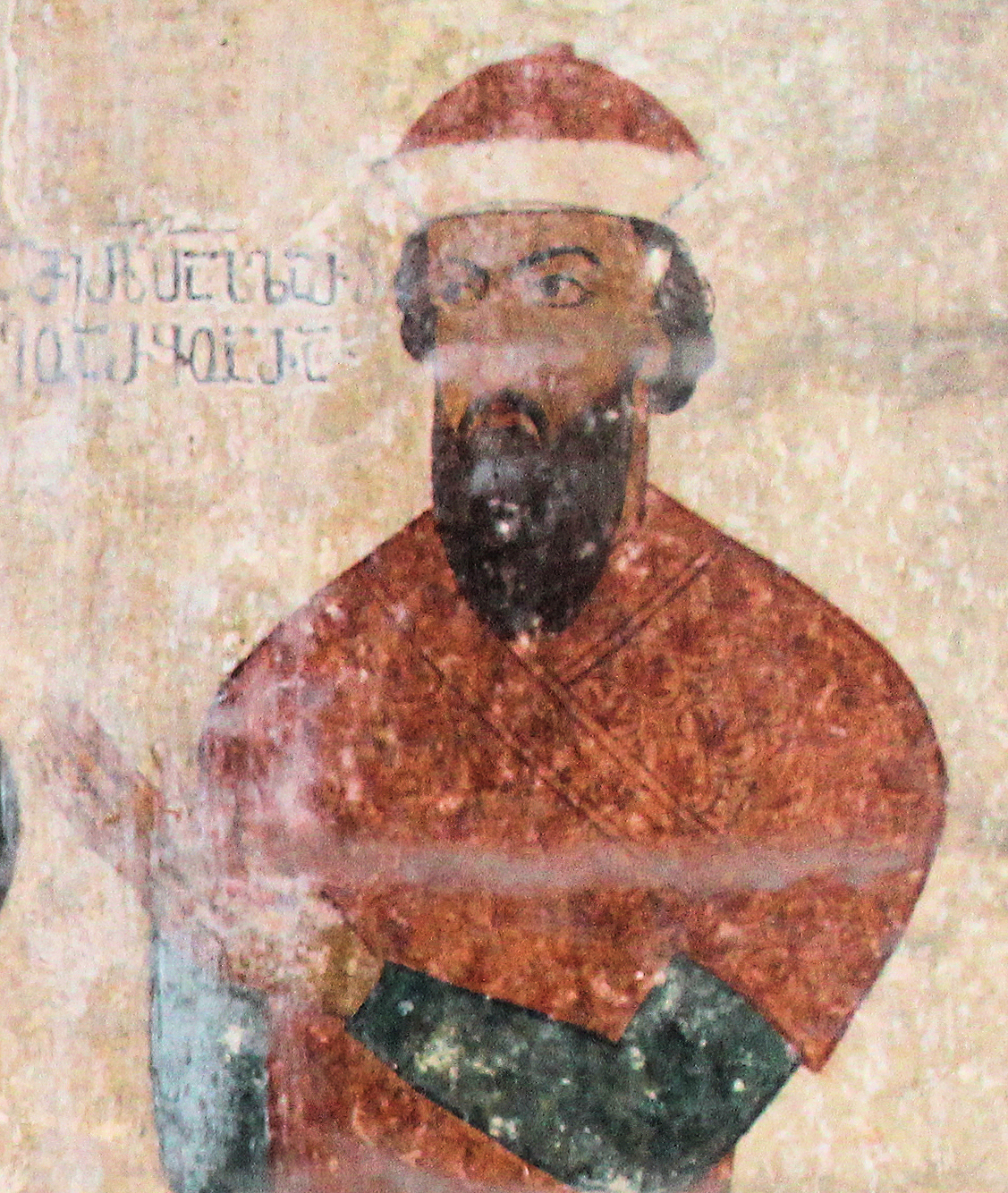
- Fresco of Qvarqvare from Zarzma Monastery

Atabeg of Samtskhe
- Reign: 1334–1361
- Predecessor: Sargis II
- Successor: Beka II
- Born: 1298
- Died: 1361 (aged 62–63)
- Issue: Beka II Jaqeli; Shalva Jaqeli
- Dynasty: Jaqeli
- Father: Sargis II Jaqeli
- Religion: Orthodox Christianity

Qvarqvare I Jaqeli (Georgian: ყვარყვარე I ჯაყელი) (1298 – 1361) was a Georgian prince (mtavari) and ruler of Samtskhe during 1334-1361.

His father was Atabeg Sargis II Jaqeli, the son of Beka I Jaqeli. In 1334, after his father's death, Qvarqvare became George V The Brilliant's vassal and was appointed as Atabeg of Samtskhe by King.

== See also ==
- House of Jaqeli
- Kingdom of Georgia

Qvarqvare I Jaqeli Jaqeli
Preceded by Sargis II	Prince of Meskheti; 1334-1361	Succeeded by Beka II
