= Botso Jaqeli =

Georgian nobleman

Botso Jaqeli (Georgian: ბოცო ჯაყელი; fl. 1184–1191) was a Georgian nobleman of the Jaqeli family, the first to have the rank of eristavi ("duke") of Samtskhe. He lost his positions for having joined an aristocratic revolt against Queen Tamar of Georgia.

Botso's parentage is not known. His father could have been either Murvan Jaqeli of an inscription from the Agara monastery, near Akhaltsikhe, or Memna, mentioned by Stepanos Orbelian as a participant of the 1178 revolt against George III of Georgia. Botso Jaqeli's namesake and possible grandfather is recorded as eristavt-eristavi ("duke of dukes") in a Georgian stone inscription from the Ali monastery, now in Turkey, and marzpan ("margrave") in a note attached to the 12th-century Gelati Gospels manuscript. According to the historian Cyril Toumanoff, Botso's successor as duke of Samtskhe, Ivane-Qvarqvare Jaqeli, was his brother. Botso's possible sister, Kravay, was married to the nobleman Samdzivari and was responsible for negotiating the surrender of Qutlu Arslan's rebellious party to Queen Tamar.

Botso Jaqeli appears as eristavi ("duke") and spasalar ("constable") of Samtskhe, an important frontier region in southwest Georgia, in the reign of Queen Regnant Tamar. Around 1187, Botso, together with Guzan, duke of Tao, repelled an attack from Saltukid Erzurum and Sham into the provinces of Shavsheti and Klarjeti. Around 1191, Botso joined the likes as Vardan Dadiani and Guzan of Tao in a failed coup in favor of Tamar's disgraced husband, George the Rus'. Botso's subsequent fate is not clear; he seems to have been deprived by Tamar of his patrimonial castle of Jaqi as well as of his possession and command of Samtskhe for these dignities then appear as belonging to Ivane-Qvarqvare Jaqeli, Botso's kinsman and, according to Toumanoff, his possible brother.

Botso's sons and descendants were known as Botsosdze. His elder son, Memna, also known as Ivane, was killed, being in charge of the defense of Tbilisi against the Khwarazmian army in 1226. A younger son, Botso (died c. 1283), also took part in this battle, commanding the last stand at Isani. This Botso was married to Vaneni, daughter of Ivane Abuserisdze, duke of Adjara, and sister of the scholar Tbeli Abuserisdze. The Botsosdze are last heard of with Shalva in the 1260s. By 1516, their estates in Samtskhe appear in possession of the Oladashvili family.

== Notes ==
Botso Jaqeli House of Jaqeli
Regnal titles
Preceded by New creation	Duke of Samtskhe c. 1184–1191	Succeeded by Ivane I Jaqeli
