= Ivane I Jaqeli =

Georgian nobleman

Ivane-Qvarqvare Jaqeli-Tsikhisjvareli (Georgian: ივანე-ყვარყვარე ჯაყელი-ციხისჯვარელი; died c. 1247) was a Georgian nobleman of the Jaqeli family, who served as eristavi ("duke") and spasalar ("constable") of Samtskhe in the early 13th century. Rising to prominence thanks to his loyal service to Queen-Regnant Tamar of Georgia, Ivane Jaqeli's long career spanned pivotal years in the history of medieval Georgia, through the "Golden Age" to the crisis and decline under the Mongol hegemony.

== Biography ==
Ivane, otherwise known as Qvarqvare, first appears in the medieval Georgian chronicles as bearing the surname Tsikhisjvareli, derived from the territorial epithet "of Tsikhisjvari". During a revolt of Queen Tamar's disgraced husband, George the Rus', around 1191, Ivane was one of the few nobles of Samtskhe who remained loyal to the queen. He might have become duke and constable of Samtskhe after the previous occupant of these offices, Botso Jaqeli, fell out of favor with Tamar for having supported George's attempted coup. Ivane was Botso's kinsman, member of the family cognate with that of Botso, or even his brother.

By 1220, under Tamar's successor, George IV Lasha, Ivane, in addition to his tenure in Samtskhe, was also Mechurchletukhutsesi ("Lord High Treasurer") at the Georgian court. When the Mongol armies moved in for the final conquest of Georgia in 1236, Ivane offered them stiff resistance and fought on until Queen Rusudan consented to a truce, in contrast to most Georgian grandees, who either surrendered without fighting or fled the Mongol advance to safer areas. The queen herself had escaped to western Georgia and did not return to the capital until being convinced to do so by the leading nobles of the kingdom, Ivane included, around 1243.

After Rusudan's death in 1245, while the Georgians were waiting for her successor to be confirmed by the Mongol Great Khan, the Mongols divided Georgia into several administrative units, tumens, run by local aristocracy. It is not known whether Ivane was at the head of any of these tumens, but during this period of interregnum he was the one whom the nobles of Georgia's southwestern marches, such as Tao, Klarjeti, Kola, and Artaani, solicited support against the invading Anatolian Turks. At the head of 10,000 troops, Ivane won a victory at the Avni plain and sent his grandsons—Ivane-Papa and Sargis—to chase the retreating Turks beyond the Georgian borders and seize Oltu, which was probably under Ayyubid control at this point. Further conquests are mentioned by the Arabic chronicler Baybars al-Mansuri, who states that the Georgians, apparently meaning the Jaqeli, profited from the Mongol invasion of Anatolia to take hold of Babrawan (Georgian Marmovani, modern Narman, south of Oltu), Washlawan (Georgian Vashlovani, of unknown location in Tao), and Bayburt.

Shortly afterwards, Ivane participated in a failed plot to overthrow the Mongol hegemony. In 1247, Ivane was among those nobles, who, alarmed by a protracted interregnum, sought out and brought back to Georgia the exiled prince David, son of the late king George IV. Ivane-Qvarqvare might have died around that time, outliving his son Beka, who was killed in a battle with the Mongols in 1220 or 1221, and, possibly, the eldest grandson Ivane (also known as Papa). The next known duke of Samtskhe was Ivane-Qvarqvare's younger grandson, Sargis I Jaqeli.

== Notes ==
Ivane I Jaqeli House of Jaqeli
Regnal titles
Preceded by Botso Jaqeli	Duke of Samtskhe c. 1191–1247	Succeeded by Sargis I Jaqeli
