= Chulevi Monastery =

Georgian Orthodox monastery near Adigeni, Georgia

Chulevi Monastery of St. George Georgian: ჭულევის მონასტერი
- The monastic church of Chulevi monastery

- Location within Georgia Location within Samtskhe-Javakheti

Religion
- Affiliation: Georgian Orthodox Church

Location
- Location: near the town of Adigeni in the historic province of Samtskhe, Georgia
- Coordinates: 41°42′14″N 42°42′08″E

Architecture
- Type: Church
- Completed: Church: 14th century.
- Dome: 1

The Chulevi monastery of St. George (Georgian: ჭულევის მონასტერი) is a 14th-century Georgian Orthodox monastic church located in Georgia's southwest region of Samtskhe-Javakheti.

The Chulevi monastery sits on the left bank of the Kvabliani river, near the town of Adigeni in the historic province of Samtskhe. The monastery is alternatively known as Chule (ჭულე) or Chulebi (ჭულები). The site was home to a monastic community already in the 11th century, but it was in the latter part of the 14th century that the current edifice was constructed to become a major religious and cultural center in south Georgia. An inscription in the medieval Georgian asomtavruli script reveals the name of the artist Arsen who frescoed the interior of Chulevi in 1381. The murals depict, inter alia, a group portrait of the local princely house of Jaqeli, patrons of the monastery.

The Chulevi monastery shares a series of common features with the contemporary and nearby located churches of Zarzma and Sapara such as the typically elongated overall plan and the interior space, rectangular shape with no projections, a dome resting upon the walls of the altar and two cross-shaped pillars, the dome tholobate containing twelve windows with half of them false.

At the same time, Chulevi is an example of decline in Georgian architecture and monumental painting due to two hundred years of Mongol dominance.

After the Ottoman conquest of the area, the Chulevi monastery declined and had been completely abandoned by 1595. The locals, still Christian at that time, saved the bells and some other church items by burying them in the adjacent wood. The bells were accidentally discovered in the 1980s and donated to the Akhaltsikhe local museum but were eventually turned over to the monastery once it was restored to the Georgian Orthodox Church in October 1999.

A team of Russian architects attempted, unsuccessfully, to repair the church in 1935/36 and several architectural details were lost in the process. Another attempt at rehabilitation was made in the 1970s and 1980s but was then interrupted. It was not until 2003 that systematic reconstruction fieldworks were launched and the monastery has largely been repaired since then.

== See also ==
- Zarzma monastery
- Sapara Monastery
