= Kravay Jaqeli =

Kravay Jaqeli (Georgian: კრავაჲ ჯაყელი) was a Georgian noble and a leading "aznauri" of the Jaqeli family, Botso's possible sister, Kravay, was married to the nobleman Samdzivari and was responsible for negotiating the surrender of Qutlu Arslan's rebellious party to Queen Tamar.

== Bibliography ==
- Bakhtadze, Mikheil (2010). Austrian History Yearbook 1966 ჯაყელთა საგვარეულოს ისტორია XI-XV საუკუნეებში [History of the Jaqeli family from the 11th to the 15th century] (in Georgian). Tbilisi: Artanuji. ISBN 9789994055456.
- Toumanoff, Cyrille (1990). Les dynasties de la Caucasie Chrétienne: de l'Antiquité jusqu'au XIXe siècle: tables généalogiques et chronologique [Dynasties of Christian Caucasia from Antiquity to the 19th century: genealogical and chronological tables] (in French). Rome.
