= Qvarqvare II Jaqeli =

Atabeg of Samtskhe
- Reign: 1451–1498
- Predecessor: Aghbugha II
- Successor: Kaikhosro I
- Born: 1416
- Died: 1498 (aged 81–82)
- Issue: Kaikhosro I Jaqeli; Mzetchabuk Jaqeli; Manuchar I Jaqeli
- Dynasty: Jaqeli
- Father: Ivane II Jaqeli
- Religion: Orthodox Christianity

Qvarqvare II Jaqeli or Kvarkvare II Jaqeli (Georgian: ყვარყვარე II ჯაყელი) (1416 – 1498) was a Prince of Samtskhe-Saatabago, styled Atabeg of Samtskhe or Prince of Meskheti during 1451–1498. He was a member of the Jaqeli family, the son of Ivane II Jaqeli. In 1440s Qvarqvare rebelled against his brother, Aghbugha II, but his revolts were suppressed by Georgian nobles. Despite this, a few years later he succeeded Aghbugha, who died in 1451. Qvarqvare, like his father fought against Royal house of Georgia for independence of Samstkhe. In 1465 he defeated Georgian King George VIII at the battle near Paravani lake. Qvarqvare captured king George and imprisoned him in Akhaltsikhe. After this fact, Principality of Samtskhe separated from Georgia. He also participated in the Georgian civil war, after which United Georgia fell. Qvarqvare's independent reign was marked by warfare with the powerful Muslim states that surrounded the principality. The Ağ Qoyunlu launched major attacks in 1466, 1476-1477 and 1485 and from 1479 the Ottoman Empire started to encroach on the territories. Qvarqvare also had a number of victories. Armenian sources record that in 1479 he ravaged the land around Erzurum, reducing the city to tributary status.

Qvarqvare II Jaqeli Jaqeli
Preceded by Aghbugha II	Prince of Meskheti; 1451-1498	Succeeded by Kaikhosro I
