= Turkish–Georgian war =

Turkish–Georgian war may refer to:

- Georgian–Seljuk wars (11th-12th century)
- Georgian campaign against the Eldiguzids (13th century)
- Khwarazmian–Georgian wars (13th century)
- Azat Mousa's invasion of Georgia (14th century)
- Timurid invasions of Georgia (1386–1403)
- Turkoman invasions of Georgia (15th century)
- Ottoman invasion of Imereti (1509)
- Ottoman invasion of Guria (1547)
- Georgian Expedition (1549) [tr]
- Lala Mustafa Pasha's Caucasian campaign (1578)
- Ottoman invasion of western Georgia (1703)
- part of the Caucasus campaign of World War I during 1918
- Turkish invasion of Georgia (1921), when Turkey intervened during the Soviet invasion of Georgia
