= Astragalus aspindzicus =

Aspindzian astragalus

Conservation status
- Vulnerable (IUCN 3.1)

Scientific classification
- Kingdom: Plantae
- Clade: Tracheophytes
- Clade: Angiosperms
- Clade: Eudicots
- Clade: Rosids
- Order: Fabales
- Family: Fabaceae
- Subfamily: Faboideae
- Genus: Astragalus
- Species: A. aspindzicus

Binomial name
- Astragalus aspindzicus Manden. & Chinth.

Synonyms
- Astragalus sevangensis subsp. aspindzicus (Manden. & Chinth.) Sytin

Species of legume

Astragalus aspindzicus, the Aspindzian astragalus, is a species of milkvetch that is endemic to the Meskheti region in southern Georgia.

== Distribution and habitat ==
It can be found on dry stony places in the mid montane zone, between elevations of 1,500–1,800 m. It is threatened by agriculture and road construction.
