= Sargis I Jaqeli =

Georgian ruling prince

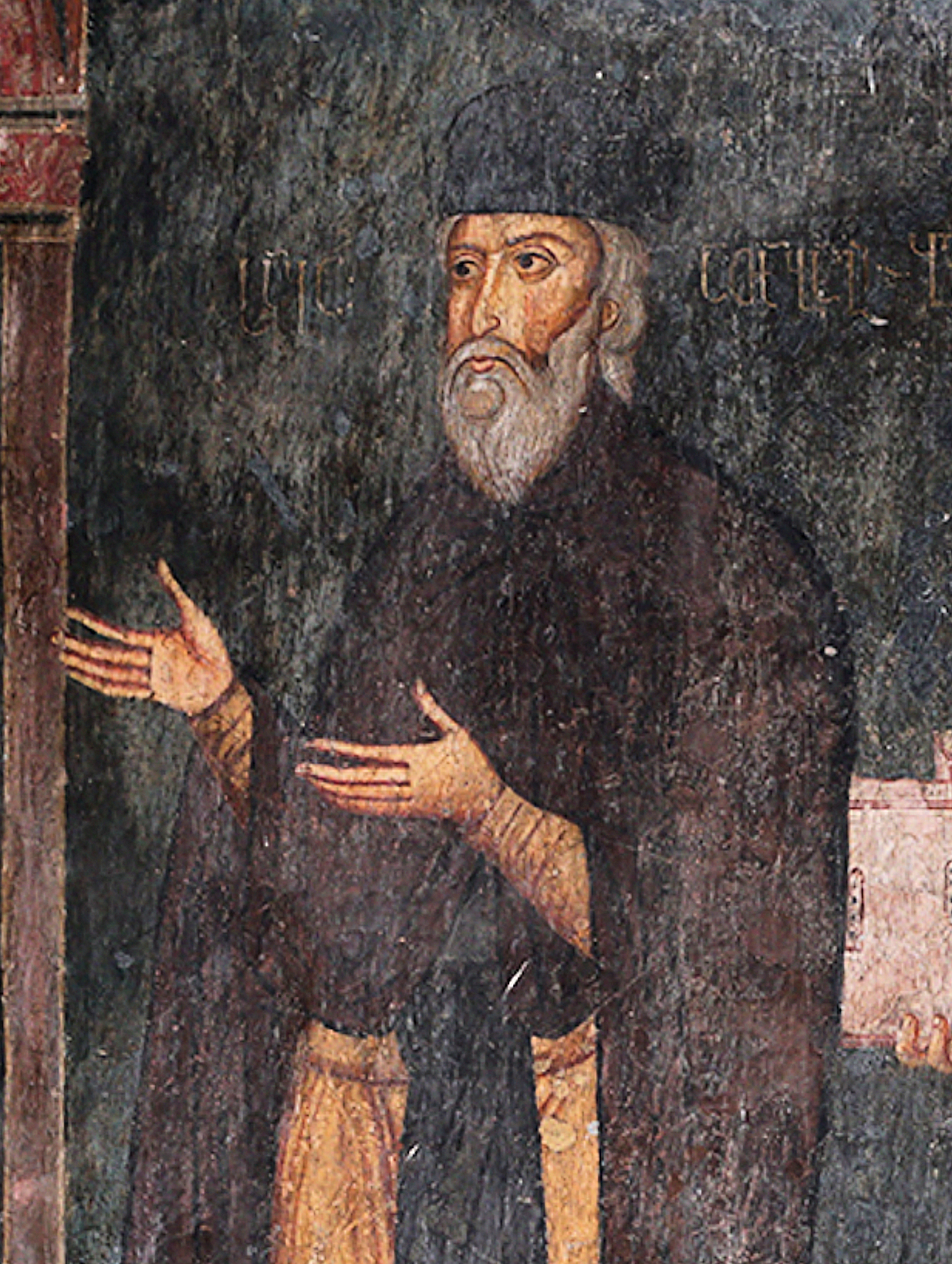
- Fresco of Sargis I Jaqeli from the Sapara Monastery.

Atabeg of Samtskhe
- Reign: 1268–1285
- Successor: Beka I
- Died: 1285
- Issue: Beka I Jaqeli
- Dynasty: Jaqeli
- Father: Beka Jaqeli
- Religion: Orthodox Christianity

Sargis I Jaqeli (Georgian: სარგის I ჯაყელი; died 1285) was a Georgian ruling prince (mtavari) of the House of Jaqeli who became the first sovereign Prince of Samtskhe in 1268.

Sargis was a son of Beka Jaqeli, killed in battle with the Mongols in 1220, and grandson of Ivane I Jaqeli, eristavi ("duke") and spasalar ("constable") of Samtskhe. He had an older brother, Ivane also known as Papa, with whom Sargis fought the invading Anatolian Turkish forces under their grandfather's command around 1245. By that time, the Kingdom of Georgia had come under the Mongol political hegemony and had been in decline.

Sargis then appears in the historical records as the spasalar of Samtskhe, apparently succeeding his grandfather Ivane, who might have died around 1247. Sargis served loyally to King David VII of Georgia, who revolted from the overlordship of the Mongol Il-Khans and placed his forces under Jaqeli's command in 1260. In December 1260, captaining a force of 8,000 rebels, Sargis engaged some 20,000 troops led by the Mongol general Arghun Aqa in the environs of Tashiskari and Akhaldaba. While an initial vanguard encounter of 1,500 Georgians with Arghun's 6,000 horsemen was a success, the rebels were eventually routed when the main forces engaged in fighting after Arghun was dissuaded by a loyal Georgian, Kakha Toreli, from retreating. Sargis fell back to the rebel king David's headquarters in Atsquri, but he succeeded in beating off Arghun's attack on his patrimonial fortress of Tsikhisjvari in May 1261. Subsequently, David VII and Sargis gave up the struggle and joined David VI, David VII's cousin and co-king in western Georgia.

In 1262, Sargis accompanied David VII to the Il-Khan court. He is reported to have pleaded himself guilty of a revolt in order to save his royal suzerain from Hulagu Khan's rage, citing corruption of the Il-Khan tax officials as a pretext. Around the same time, he took part in the Il-Khan's struggle against the rival Mongol ruler Berke of the Golden Horde, and reputedly saved Hulagu's life during a battle. The khan decided to reward Sargis's service by granting him the city of Karin, an honor blocked by jealous Georgian rivals who were able to convince the malleable king David of Jaqeli's treachery. Sargis was imprisoned on his return to Tbilisi, but quickly released through the Il-Khan's intervention. Having felt betrayed, Sargis broke with the Georgian court, but remained a faithful vassal to the Il-Khans and obtained from Hulagu the status of injü, that is, "crown land" in 1266. This meant that Samtskhe became virtually independent of the Georgian crown and was placed under the direct Il-Khan suzerainty. Sargis’s association with the Georgian court was not completely severed, however, as we hear of him having the dignity of Lord High Treasurer under Demetrius II of Georgia (r. 1270–1289). The ailing aged prince Sargis ended his life in retirement in the Sapara Monastery under the name Saba, being succeeded by his son Beka I Jaqeli. Beka built a church at the monastery and dedicated it to St. Saba, when the father was still alive.

Sargis I Jaqeli Jaqeli
Preceded by New Creation	Prince of Meskheti; 1268-1285	Succeeded by Beka I
