= Meskhetians =

Ethnographic subgroup of Georgians

Meskhetian or Meskhian Georgian: მესხები meskhebi
- Distribution of the Meskhetian dialect

Total population
- c. 89,995 - 100,000

Regions with significant populations
- Georgia; Samtskhe-Javakheti: 77 498 or 48,3 % (2014)

Languages
- Meskhetian dialect of Georgian language

Religion
- Predominantly † Georgian Orthodox Church; Catholic, Jewish and Muslim minority.

Meskhians (Georgian: მესხები, Meskhebi) are an ethnographic subgroup of Georgians who speak the Meskhetian dialect of the Georgian language. Meskhetians are the indigenous population of Meskheti, a historical region in southern Georgia. Today they are mainly followers of Georgian Orthodox Church, while part of them are Catholics.

== History ==
Several authors have connected Meskhetians or Meskhians to Mushki tribe or Moschoi (Μόσχοι) in Greek sources, who were an Iron Age people of Anatolia. Meskhian tribes came to the fore, gradually moving northeast and forming their settlements in the very heart of Kartli. Mtskheta, the ancient capital of Iberia (literarily means "town of Meskhs") was one such settlement, deriving its name from the ethnonym "Meskhians". According to the Cyril Toumanoff, Moschians were the early proto-Georgian tribe which played a leading role in the consolidation of Iberian tribes largely inhabiting eastern and southern Georgia.

Between 9th-11th centuries Mesketi, also known as Tao-Klarjeti, was governed by the Bagrationi dynasty and the region played a crucial role in the unification of the Georgian principalities into a single Georgian state in 1008. Meskheti gave many prominent people to the Georgia: such as Shota Rustaveli, who is considered to be the preeminent poet of the Georgian Golden Age and one of the greatest contributors to Georgian literature. Rustaveli is the author of The Knight in the Panther's Skin, which is considered to be a Georgian national epic poem.

Thereafter, the kingdom of Georgia declined and eventually disintegrated under hegemony of various regional powers, including the Mongols, Timurids, Black and White Sheeps. After the Mongol invasion of Georgia, Meskhetian princes gained virtual independence from the Georgian crown and established Principality of Samtskhe under the Mongol patronage.

By the Peace of Amasya (1555), Principality of Samtskhe was divided into two, with the Safavids keeping the eastern part and the Ottomans gaining the western part. In 1578, the Ottomans performed a successful invasion into additional Georgian territories not under their control, triggering the Ottoman-Safavid War of 1578-1590. By 1582, the Turks were in possession of the eastern part of Meskheti as well. The Georgian population of Meskheti was temporarily displaced to inner regions of Georgia such as Imereti and Kartli.

Following the Russo-Turkish War of 1828, much of the historic Meskheti was liberated from Turks and reunited with the Georgian mainland, this time under Russian Imperial rule. A significant number of Georgians, including notable military figures like Roman Bagration, participated in the campaign to reclaim these lands from the Ottomans.

== Notable Meskhetians ==
- Shota Rustaveli (c.1160—after c. 1220), medieval Georgian poet and author of The Knight in the Panther's Skin.
- Anthim the Iberian (1650—1716), Georgian theologian, scholar, calligrapher and philosopher.
- Michel Tamarati (1858-1911), Georgian Roman Catholic priest and historian.
- Vano Merabishvili, Georgian politician and former Prime Minister of Georgia from 4 July to 25 October 2012.

== See also ==
- Meskhetian Turks
- Samtskhe–Javakheti
- Meskheti

== Sources ==
- Floor, Willem (2001). Safavid Government Institutions. Costa Mesa, California: Mazda Publishers. ISBN 978-1568591353.
- Khazanov, Anatoly Michailovich (1995). After the USSR: Ethnicity, Nationalism and Politics in the Commonwealth of Independent States. University of Wisconsin Press. ISBN 0-299-14894-7.
- Mikaberidze, Alexander (2015). Historical Dictionary of Georgia (2nd ed.). Lanham, Maryland: Rowman & Littlefield. ISBN 9781442241466.
