= Azat Mousa's invasion of Georgia =

Invasion of Georgia c. 1302

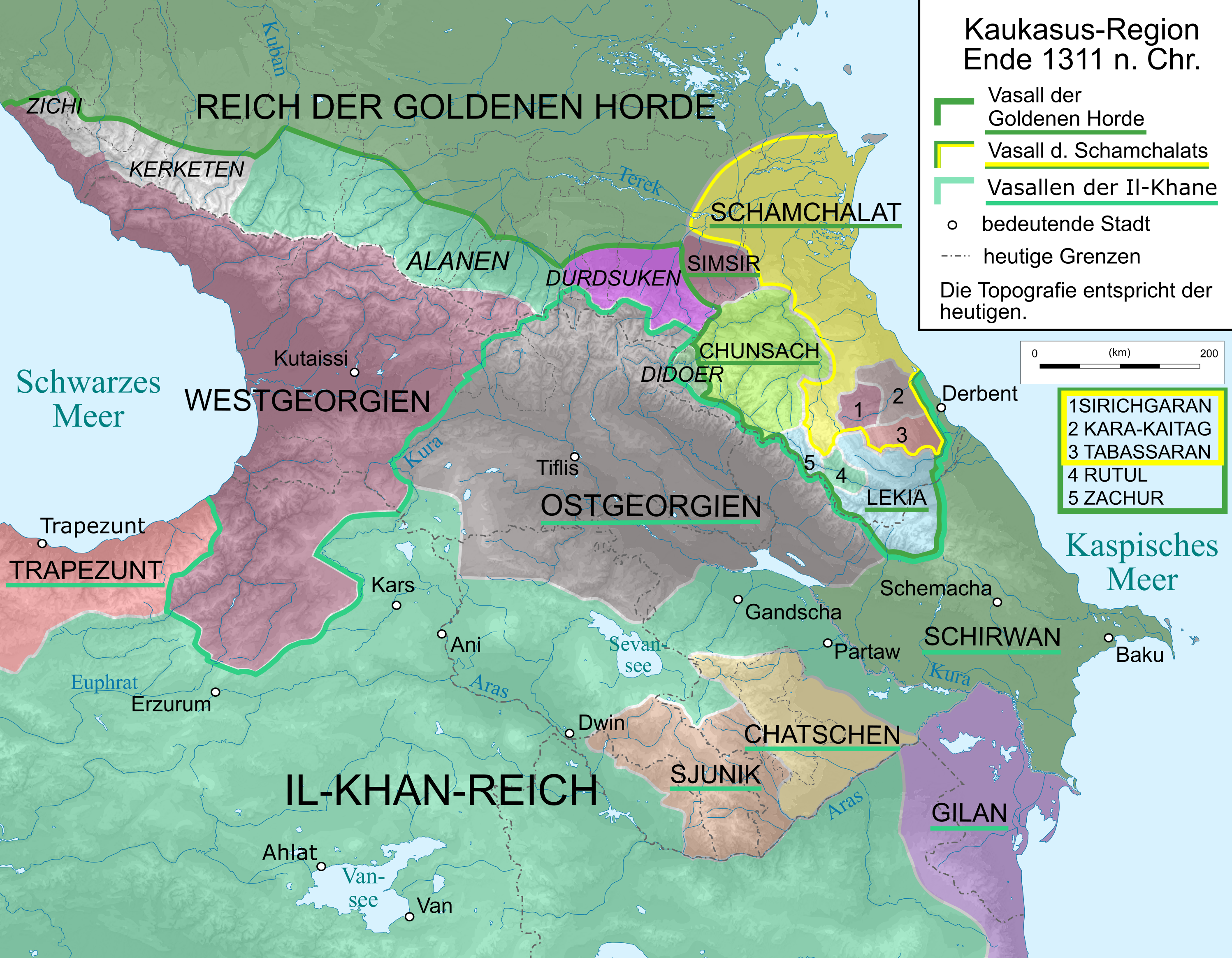
- Georgia after the invasion.
Date	c. 1302-1303
Location	Tao-Klarjeti, Kingdom of Georgia
Result	Georgian victory

Belligerents
Sultanate of Rum: Chepni tribes	Principality of Samtskhe

Commanders and leaders
Azat Mousa	Beka I of Samtskhe; Sargis II of Samtskhe; Taqa Panaskerteli

Azat Mousa's invasion of Georgia took place from c. 1302 to 1303. The invasion was initiated by group of Turkoman tribes led by Azat Mousa, it is likely that they were connected with the Chepni clan, the main nomadic tribe in the hinterland of Pontus.

== History ==
By 1298, the Turkomans had become a serious threat to the Empire of Trebizond, advancing east as far as the Georgian border and laying waste to territories including Speri and Bayburt. One of the leaders of these Turkoman hordes was Azat Musa, probably associated with the Chepni tribe in the depths of Pontus. In 1298-1299, Rashid al-Din Hamadani reported that nomadic Turkoman flooded the “mountains of Trebizond” (probably referring to the Pontic Alps) and the regions of Erzincan and Bayburt.

Around 1301 or 1302, Alexios II of Trebizond defeated a Turkoman invasion. The Turks continued their seasonal movement into the Georgian territory. When Azat-Mousa reached Tao and Basiani, he devastated them and took captives, later he moved to impassable Murghuli and Nigali valley, where his army was beaten off by the sons of noble Kherkhemeli. In about 1302, duke of Tao, Taqa Panaskerteli defeated the Turkomans at Tortomi Castle, but was unable to drive them from his lands. The Turks grew yet more furious, and devastated Tao. News of these events reached prince Beka I of Samtskhe, who summoned all his subjects and set out against the Turks.

Next year, the Turks started to return. Beka called all his subjects and gathered about 12,000 men, and set out against the Turks. The Turks entered the Parkhali Mountains, where they set up a camp, and sent 10,000 horsemen to plunder in Vashlovani. A fierce battle took place, and the Turks fled, and a great number of them were destroyed. Beka quickly advanced towards Speri and Bayburd. They captured the town, except for the fortress. When it became impossible to stand Beka's siege, they sent him an envoy and agreed to pay tribute.
