= Shah Verdi Khan =

Shah Verdi Khan was the last atabeg of Lesser Luristan of the Khorshidi dynasty.

Shah Verdi Khan was the husband of a Safavid princess who was the daughter of Prince Badi al-Zaman Mirza who is the son of Prince Bahram Mirza who is the son of Shah Ismail I

Around the start of the 17th century Verdi Khan revolted against the tribute he was assessed by Shah Abbas I. This led to Abbas invading Luristan and removing Verdi Khan from power.

== Sources ==
- Don Juan of Persia: A Shi'ah Catholic. trans. by G. Le Strange. (Kessinger Publishing, 2003) p. 216.
