= Sapara Monastery =

Georgian Orthodox monastery near Akhaltsikhe, Georgia

Sapara Monastery Georgian: საფარის მონასტერი
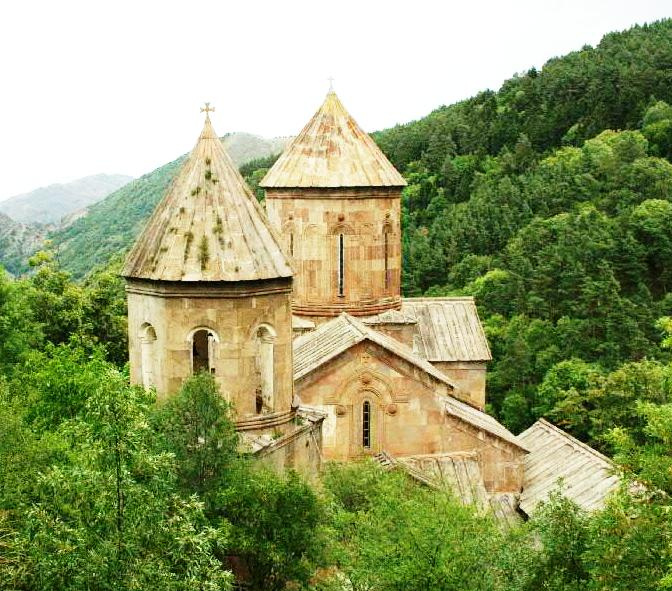
- Sapara Monastery, St. Saba church

- Location within Georgia Location within Samtskhe-Javakheti

Religion
- Affiliation: Georgian Orthodox Church

Location
- Coordinates: 41°36′08″N 43°01′49″E

Architecture
- Type: Church
- Completed: Church: 9th century, renovated ?.
- Dome: 1

Sapara Monastery (Georgian: საფარის მონასტერი) is a Georgian Orthodox monastery in the Akhaltsikhe District of Samtskhe-Javakheti region, Georgia.

== History ==
It has existed from at least the 9th century, and has numbered among its monks many important figures in Georgian ecclesiastical history. At the end of the 13th century Sapara became a possession of the Jakeli family, whose leader, Sargis Jakeli, was adept at staying on good terms with the Mongols, which enabled Samtskhe to enjoy a peace unusual for the time. When he grew old, Sargis took monastic orders and changed his name to Saba. His son Beka built the largest of the 12 churches here, St Saba's Church, named after the saint whose name his father had adopted, one of the most architecturally important churches of its time. The 14th-century frescoes inside are of high quality.

From the end of the 16th century until the beginning of the 17th century the Sapara Monastery became empty due to the expansion of Ottoman Empire policy into Samtskhe and during this process the monastery's icons and other treasures were taken to more protected areas of Georgia.

== Architecture ==
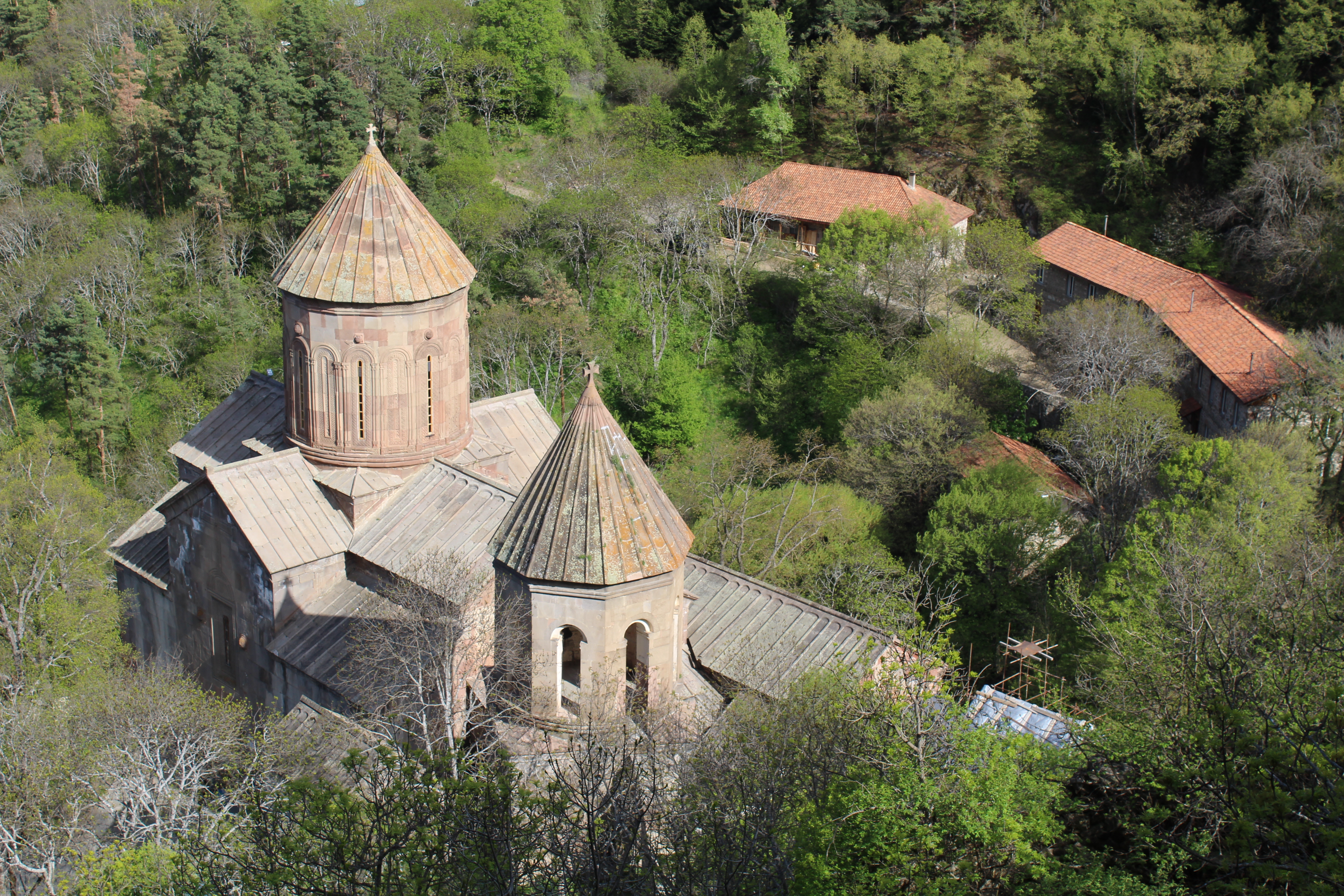
Arial View

Set in a green forested canyon, the monastery is contrastingly distinguished by its pink and yellow stones. The ensemble is composed of church buildings and remnants of a palace and fortifications walls. The most important is the cross-in-square temple of St. Saba. Another significant church is St. Mary's Assumption Church.

=== St. Mary's Assumption Church ===
This was the earliest church in the ensemble, built, probably, in the 10th century. The large hall church has two entrances: original, western, and northern, which was opened after the construction of St. Saba's Church. The western part, unusually for hall churches, has two floors. Its eastern part contains the apse with the conch. The fragments of frescos date to the beginning of 14th century. The facades are decorated by reliefs.

=== St. Saba's Church ===
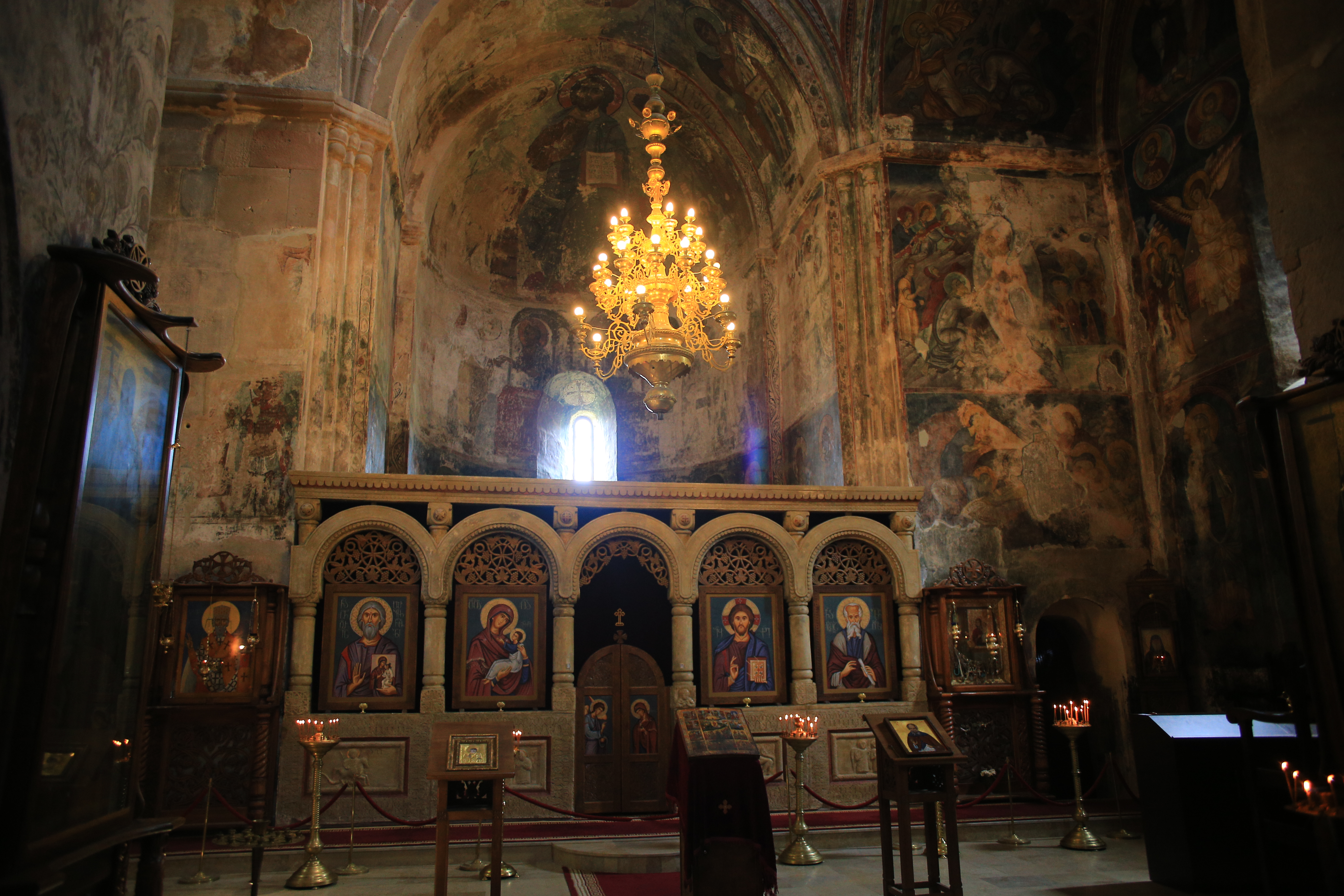
Interior

Best example of the 13th century temple architecture in Georgia, this church also survived in rather good condition till modern times. Ordered to be constructed by Beka I Jaqeli, it was built by architect Peresasdze. His name can be found on the western window arch of the portal. Due to complex relief and little space he had to build a wall from the southern side.

The church probably had three entrances. Currently only the northern and western remain. The eastern facade is distinguished by contrastingly produced square altar part.

Within the church the apse is flanked by the prothesis and sacristy on the ground floor, and the crypts on the upper.

An archaic feature is the presence of choirs in the upper floor of the western part. The upper floor is connected with the entire space by the arches.

The interior is illuminated rather weakly by four windows, one in each arm of the cross, and eight windows in the dome tholobate.

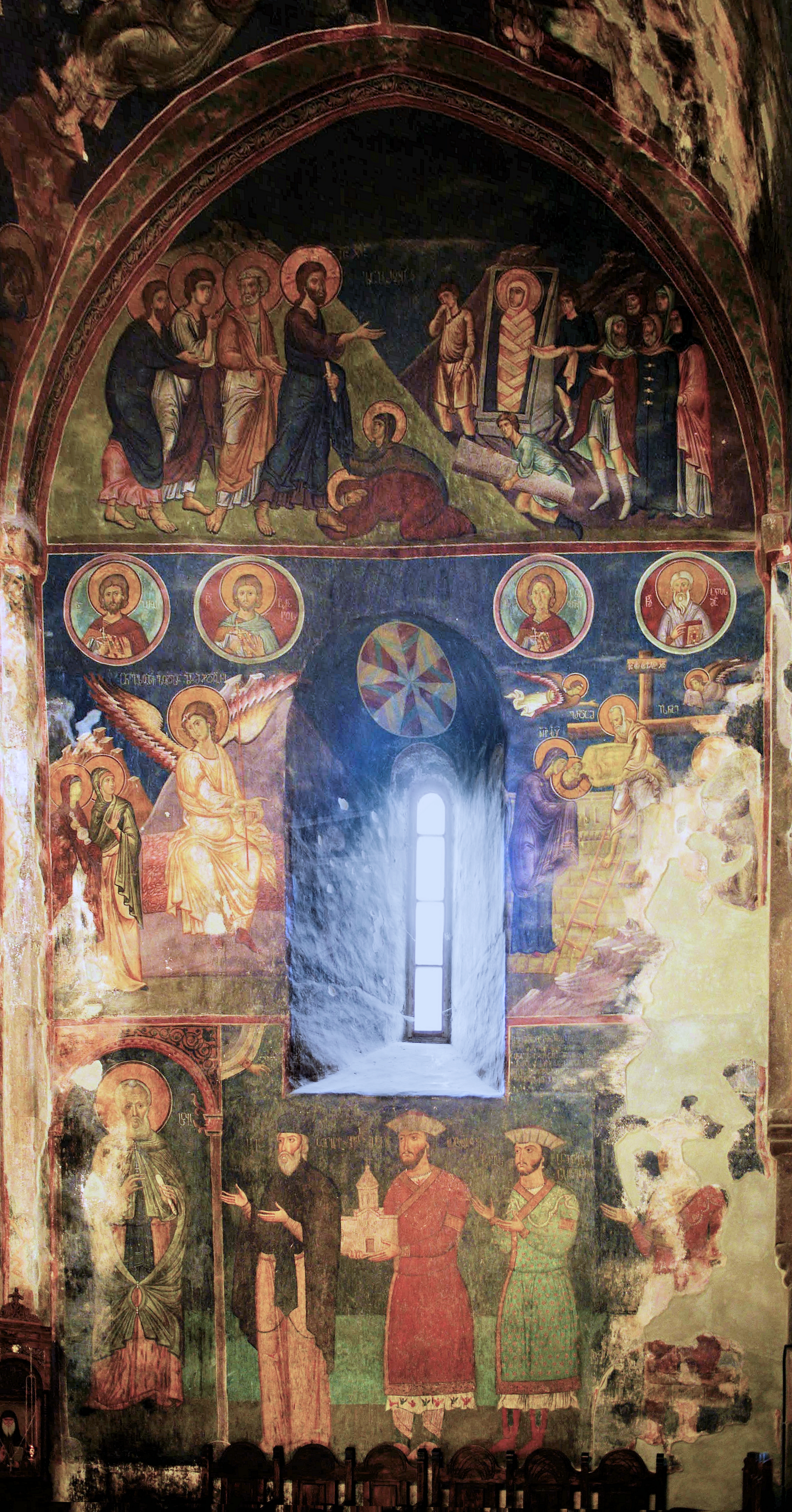
Mural

The mural have signs of development through the church history: variation in the manner, colours, width of contours. The murals of the southern wall are probably the oldest, from the 14th century. Generally following the traditions of that period, special accent is made on space and tonality with a number of planes.

The lower part of the southern wall depicts St. Saba and Jaqeli rulers of Samtskhe: Sargis I, Beka I, Sargis II and Kvarkvare. Above them the Great Feasts, also depicted on the northern wall. The western wall contains numerous Biblical scenes. Among them healings, miracles and the Last Judgement. The apse, in addition to bishops and deacons, depicts the Deesus and Eucharist. The vaults are decorated by the medallions of evangelists. Further up, the tholobate contains eight disciples. Above them, in the dome, the Ascension.

The exterior decoration is rich as well. Polychromatic red-violet cladding is typical for the period, as well as the dipped window decorations. It is rather hard to explore the eastern facade, hanging over a precipice; thus poor decoration. Southern facade has ornamentation around the entrance and the windows, particularly the central window. Entering from the northern portal, its tympanum contains a cross with two medallions, carrying birds. An ornamentation flanks the entrance. The eastern portal and the upper facade both have rich and harmonic ornamentation.

The heavy dome contains sixteen windows on the tholobate - eight true and eight false, a feature that will become common in later churches.

Its bell tower is one of the oldest built in Georgia. Its cubic first floor contain depictions of the members of Lasuridze family, and, thus, served as their tomb. The belfry is on the upper floor.

== See also ==
- Chulevi monastery
- Zarzma monastery
- Balda Monastery of St. Mary's Assumption
