= Samtskhe-Saatabago =

Principality

Samtskhe-Saatabago სამცხე-საათაბაგო
- 1266–1625
- Flag according to Vakhushti Coat of arms

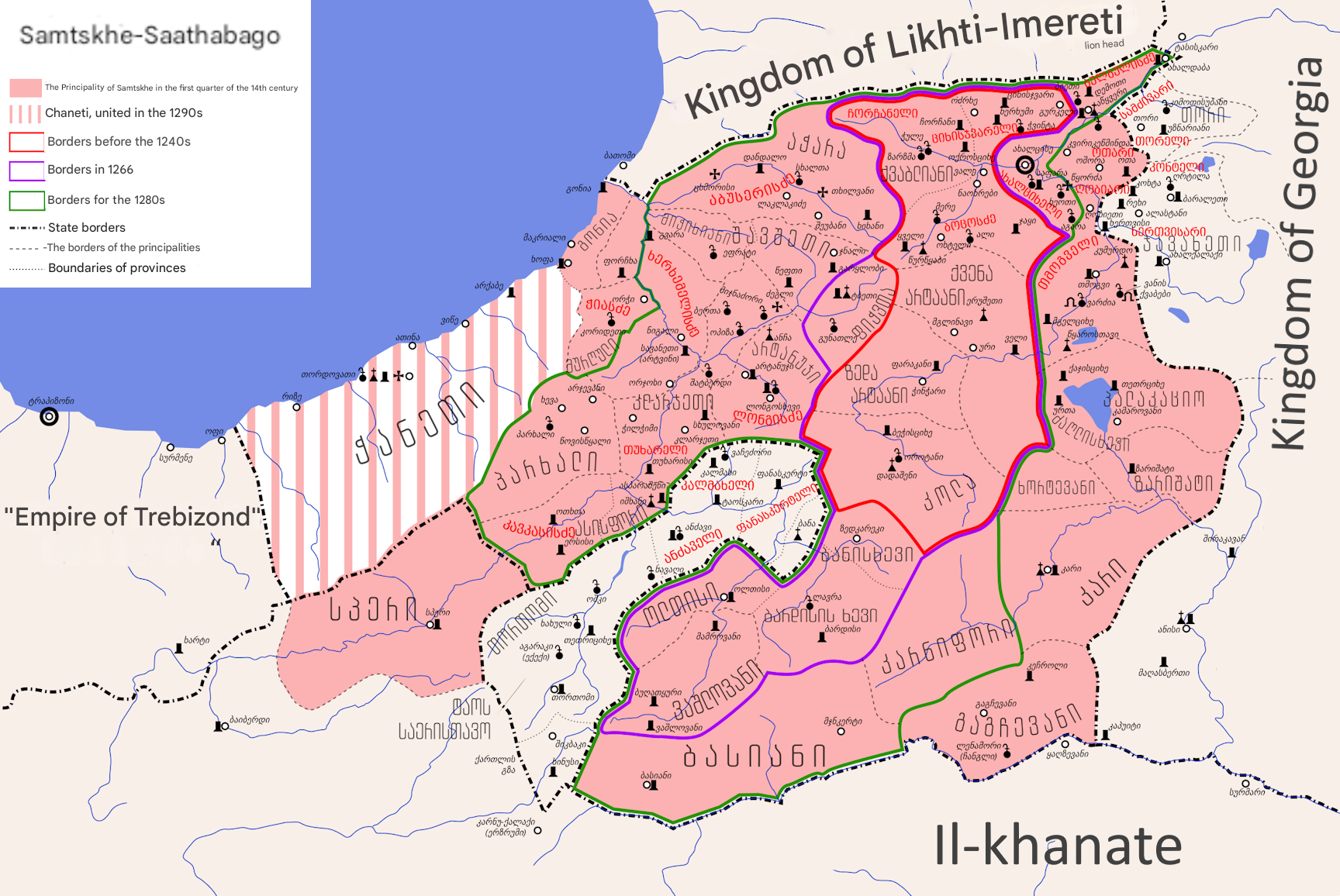
- boundaries of the Samtskhe-Saatabago in the 2nd half of the 13th and the 1st quarter of the 14th centuries.
- Capital: Akhaltsikhe; 41°38′20″N 42°59′10″E
- Common languages: Georgian
- Religion: Eastern Orthodox Christianity
- Government: Principality
- Prince of Meskheti
  - 1260–1285: Sargis I (first)
  - 1607–1625: Manuchar III (last)
- Historical era: Late Middle Ages
  - Established: 1266
  - Vassal of Mongol Empire: 1266–1334
  - Reunited with Kingdom of Georgia: 1334–1535
  - Peace of Amasya: 1555
  - Disestablished: 1625
Preceded by	Succeeded by
Kingdom of Georgia	Childir Eyalet
- Today part of: Armenia; Georgia; Turkey

The Samtskhe-Saatabago or Samtskhe Atabegate (Georgian: სამცხე-საათაბაგო), also called the Principality of Samtskhe (სამცხის სამთავრო), was a Georgian feudal principality in Zemo Kartli, ruled by an atabeg (tutor) of Georgia for nearly three and a half centuries, between 1268 and 1625. Its territory consisted of the modern-day Samtskhe-Javakheti region and the historical region of Tao-Klarjeti.

== History ==
=== Duchy of Samtskhe ===
By the early 13th century, members of the House of Jaqeli were one among many powerful marcher lords, and certainly not the most significant. The title atabeg, by which the Jaqelis would later be known, was as yet reserved for the Mkhargrdzelis, the Armenian family that controlled Ani. The rise of the Jaqeli line was intimately bound up with the Mongol invasion of Georgia. In this initial phase of conquest, most of the Georgian and Armenian nobles, who held military posts along the frontier regions submitted without any serious opposition or confined their resistance to their castles while others preferred to flee to safer areas. Queen Rusudan had to evacuate Tbilisi for Kutaisi, leaving eastern Georgia in the hands of atabeg Avag Mkhargrdzeli and Egarslan Bakurtsikheli, who made peace with the Mongols and agreed to pay them tribute. The only Georgian great noble to have resisted was Ivane I Jaqeli, prince of Samtskhe. His extensive possessions were fearfully devastated, and Ivane had to finally, with the consent of Queen Rusudan, submit to the invaders in 1238.

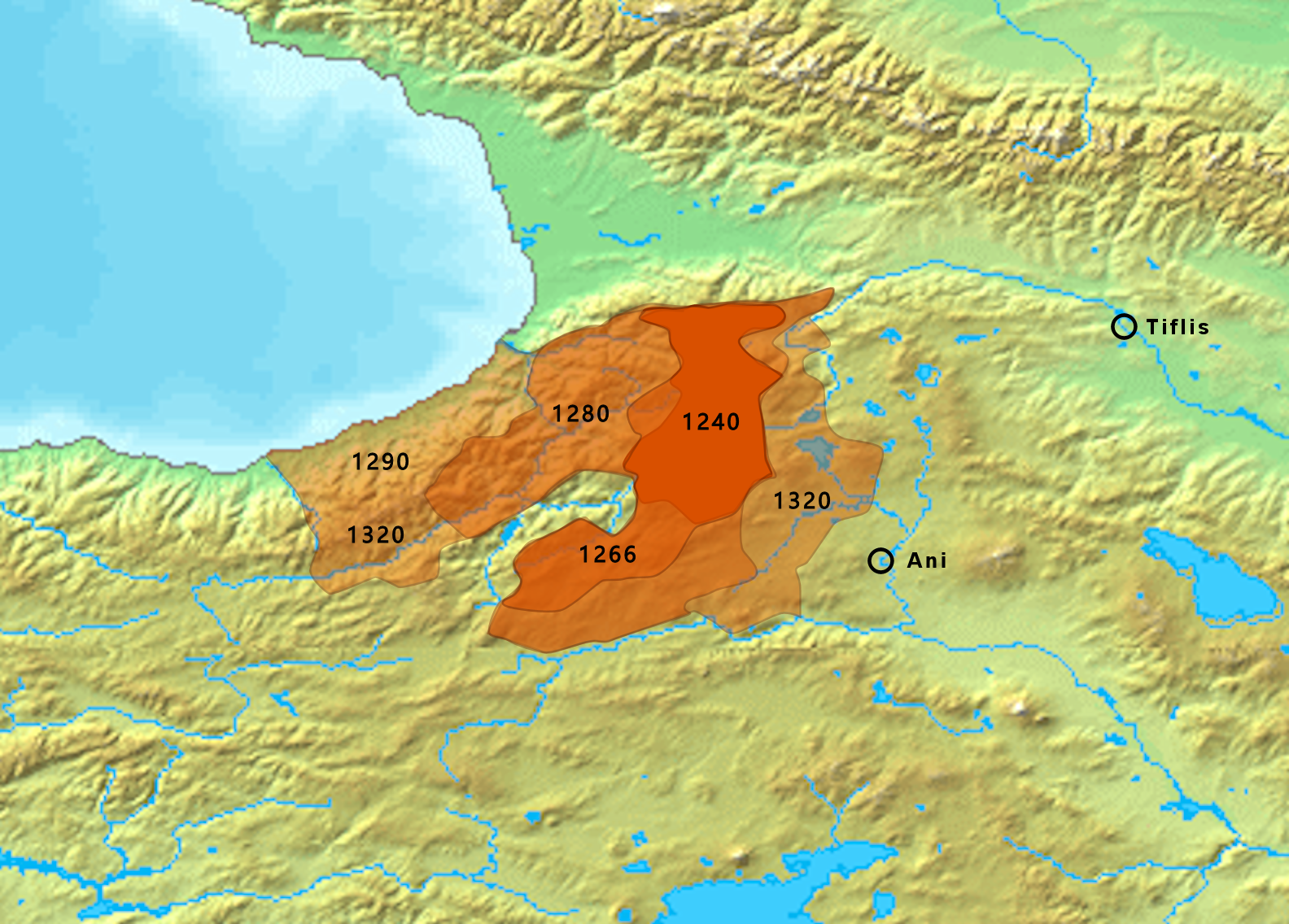
Map of Samtskhe (1240-1320), during the rule of the House of Jaqeli.

Taking advantage of Georgia's weakness, Turkmen incursions started to south-western Georgia. The population of Tao, Klarjeti and Kola called on Qvarqvare, lord of Samtskhe, to assist them against the Turkmens. Qvarqvare subsequently sent his grandson Sargis to seize Oltisi. Although an Arabic chronicler Baybars al-Mansuri states that the Georgians took advantage of the Mongol invasion of Anatolia (1243) to seize the castles of Babrawan, Washlawan, and Bayburt. By the mid-13th century, the Jaqelis realm thus incorporated most of the mountainous areas of north eastern Anatolia south of the Black Sea coast up to the edge of the plain of Erzurum. The Jaqelis' lands became a stronghold of opposition to Mongol rule.

Sargis I Jaqeli and David VII of Georgia "Ulu" rebelled against their Mongol overlords, a huge army of Mongols led by Arghun Noyan attacked the southern Georgian province of Samtskhe, defeated the king and his spasalar (general) Sargis Jaqeli, but could not capture the rebels’ main strongholds and left the country in June 1261. Nevertheless, the forces were unequal and David Ulu had to take refuge at his cousin, David VI Narin’s court at Kutaisi. In 1262, he had to make peace with the Mongols and returned to Tbilisi, effectively splitting the country into two parts with both rulers titled as kings of Georgia.

=== Establishment of the Princedom ===
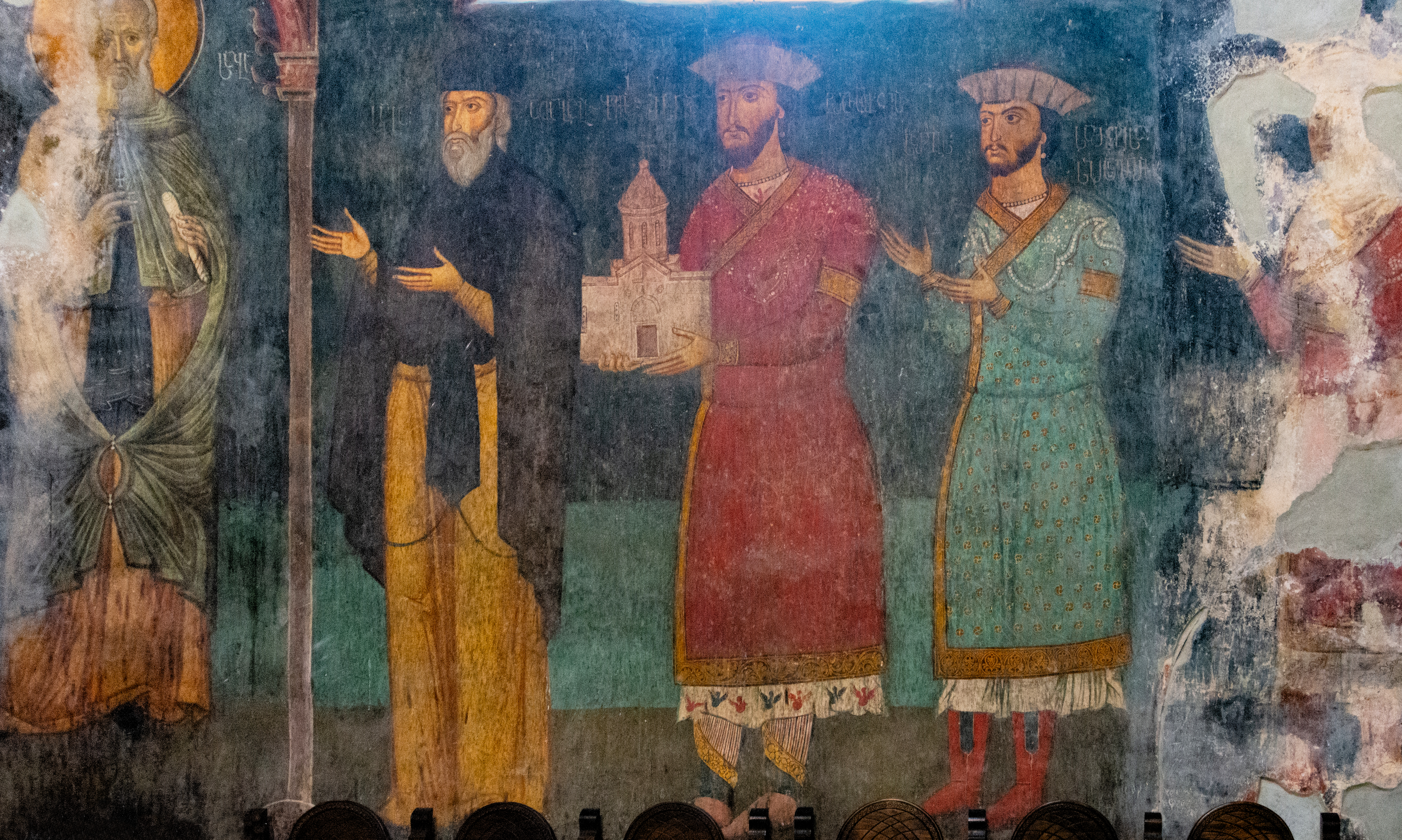
A group portrait of Princes Jaqeli (from left to right: Sargis I Jaqeli (Sabas), Beka, Sargis, and Kvarkvare). Sapara monastery, 14th c

By the Ilkhan request, David Ulu's army was dispatched to defend the fortifications of Siba against the Golden Horde in 1263. In 1265, the Georgian forces serving as a vanguard of the Ilkhanid army, defeated Berke, Khan of the Golden Horde, and expelled his troops from Shirvan. Sargis Jaqeli distinguished himself in battle against the Horde, even saving Hulagu's life, for which Hulagu offered him rich rewards, including the city of Erzurum. David Ulu subsequently persuaded Hulegu to revoke that award on the basis that it would make Sargis too powerful. As a result of a dispute with the royal court, the province of Samtskhe seceded and submitted directly to the Ilkhan rule in 1266. Thus, Georgia further disintegrated to form three separate political entities. Samtskhe managed to remain a culturally developed part of Georgia as well as maintaining territorial integrity, sometimes even expanding along its borders.

Despite being independent, Samtskhe still maintained some kind of relations with Georgia and Beka himself was given a title of Mandaturukhutsesi (Mandator) by Georgian king. At the time of Beka's rule, the Turks became more active the Southwest borders, from the Sultanate of Rum. After a series of invasions, he managed to fend off the attacks. Beka was a supporter of maintaining Georgian political influence over the Empire of Trebizond. For this cause, he married off his daughter Jiajak to the Trapezuntine Emperor Alexios II, who granted him Lazia. Another daughter of Beka, - Natela, became the consort of Demetrius II of Georgia and bore him a son and the successor to the throne. After the execution of Demetrius, future king George V was raised by his grandfather at his court.

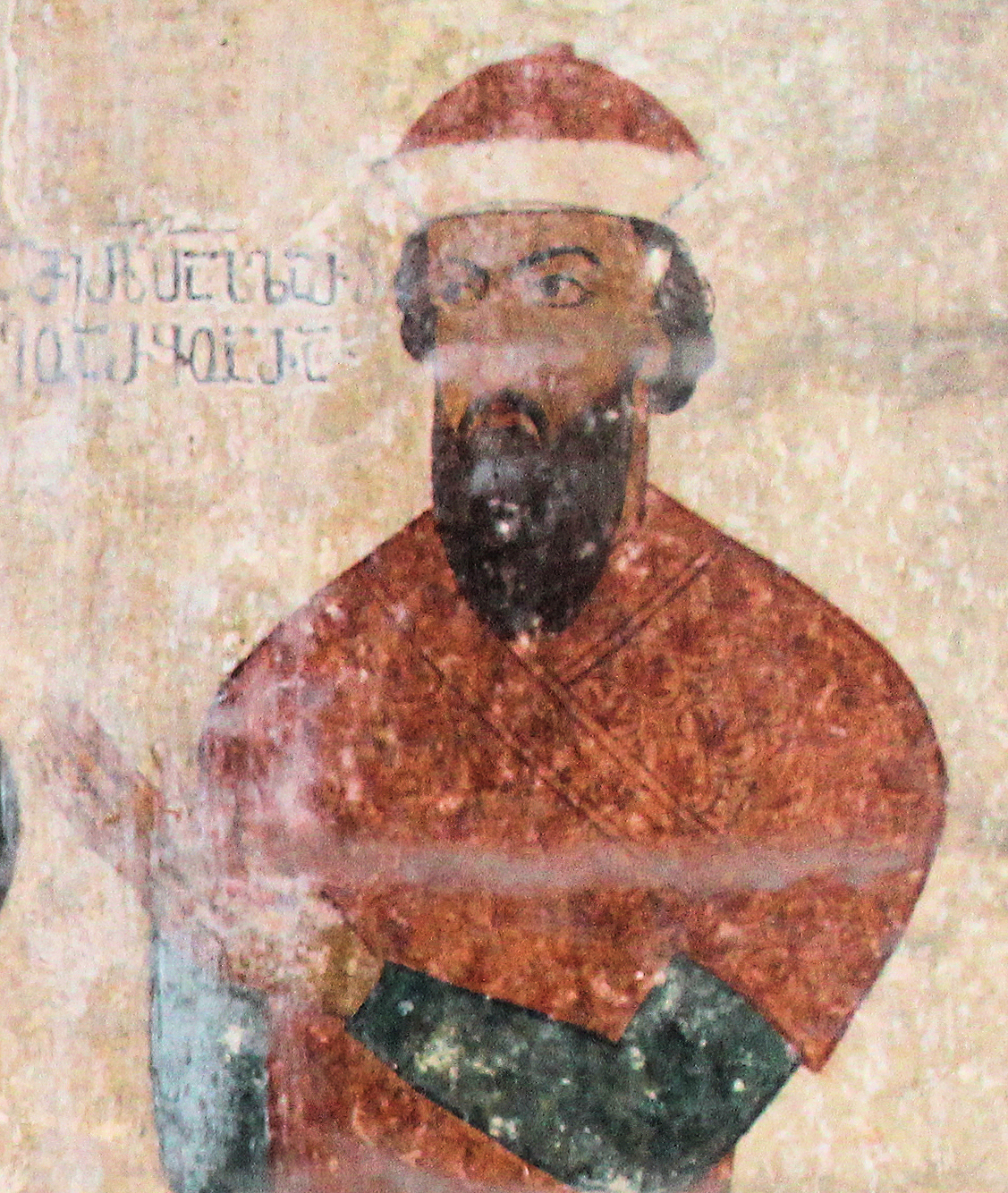
Qvarqvare I Jaqeli (r.1334–1361)

In 1334 George V of Georgia reasserted royal authority over the virtually independent principality of Samtskhe, ruled by his cousin Qvarqvare I Jaqeli. George granted the Jaqelis their title of atabeg, not only appropriate for their role in raising him but also a title of great prestige.

=== Timurid invasions ===
Between 1386 and 1403 Timur launched a series of campaigns against Georgia. The official history of Timur's reign, Zafarnama, represents this campaign as a jihad. Samtskhe was in the frontline of these attacks. Timur set out from Kars and assailed Akhaltsikhe. From there, he marched against Tbilisi which the Georgian king Bagrat V had fortified. The city fell on November 21, 1386, and King Bagrat V was captured and converted to Islam at sword point. Bagrat was given some 12,000 troops to reestablish himself in Georgia whose government was run by Bagrat's son and co-ruler George VII during his father's absence at Timur's court. The old king, however, entered in secret negotiations with George who ambushed Bagrat's Islamic escort, and freed his father.

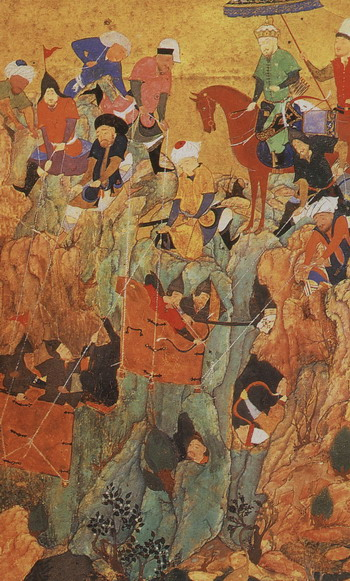
Timur's army attacks the survivors of the town of Nerges, in Samtskhe-Saatabago, in the spring of 1396. Garrett Zafarnama (c. 1480)

In the spring of 1387, Timur returned in Georgia to take revenge, however, Khan Tokhtamysh’s reappearance in Iran forced Timur to temporarily withdraw. As soon as the Golden Horde was defeated, Timur returned to attack Georgia again. In 1394, he dispatched four generals to the province of Samtskhe, with orders to apply the Islamic law of ghaza (i.e. the systematic raiding of non-Muslim lands). Timur launched a further attack on possessions of Ivane II Jaqeli in 1399. The attack on Samtskhe was followed by an expedition into Tao that reached as far as Panaskert, where a great battle between Timur and the Georgians took place.

In late 1401, Timur invaded Georgia once again. George VII had to sue for peace, and sent his brother with the contributions. Timur was preparing for a major confrontation with the Ottoman dynasty and apparently wished to freeze the currently prevailing situation in Georgia. Thus, he made peace with George on condition that the king of Georgia supplied him with troops and granted the Muslims special privileges. Timur nonetheless undertook some preventive measures and attacked the Georgian garrison of Tortumi, demolishing the citadel and looting the surrounding area. Once the Ottomans were defeated, Timur, back to Erzurum in 1402, decided to punish the king of Georgia for not having come to present his congratulations on his victory. Ivane Jaqeli, however, arrived with gifts, which offered Timur a good cause for keeping on reasonable terms with the rulers of Samtskhe.

=== Turkmen invasions ===
After the devastating invasions by Timur and subsequent enfeeblement of the Kingdom of Georgia, it soon faced a new threat. Timurid hegemony was not to last, for on Timur's death in 1405, the Kara Koyunlu re-established their empire. They took advantage of the temporary weakness of Georgians and launched attacks against them, apparently in which, George VII was killed. In response Constantine I engaged Turkomans at the Battle of Chalagan, in which he was defeated and executed. Alexander I who sought to strengthen and restore his declining Kingdom, faced constant invasions by the tribal Turkomans. They sacked Akhaltsikhe several times, the first under Qara Yusuf in 1414, the second under Jahan Shah in 1444, whose forces met those of Alexander's successor, King Vakhtang IV at Akhaltsikhe, but the fighting was inconclusive and Jahan Shah returned to Tabriz. With the decline of the Kara Koyunlu after Jahan Shah's defeat at the hands of Uzun Hasan in 1467, the Aq Qoyunlu became the major power in eastern Anatolia.

=== Secession from Georgia ===
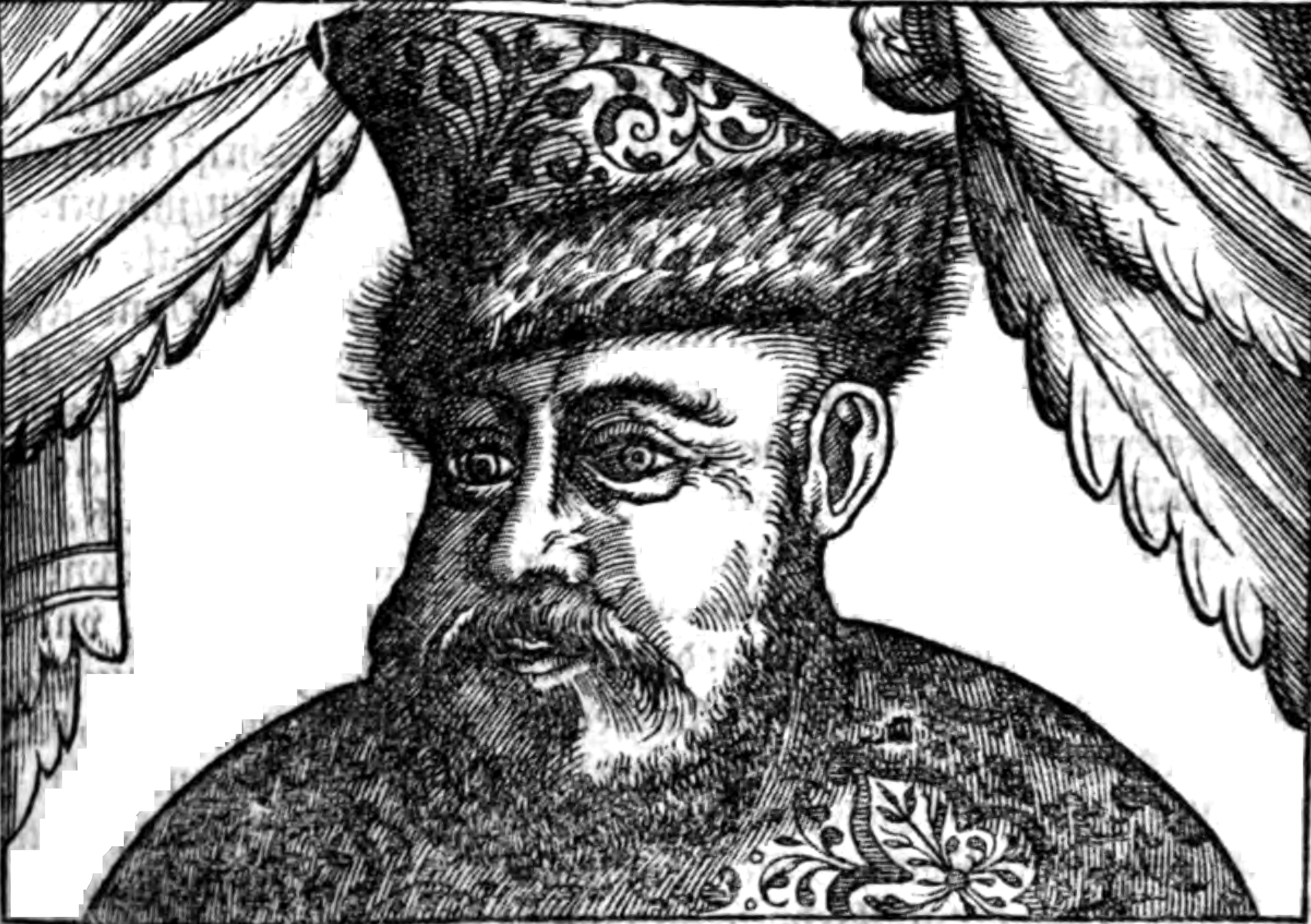
Portrait of Qvarqvare IV Jaqeli (1554 – 1581) from the book written by Salomon Schweigger

The political split of the Kingdom of Georgia was speeded up by the Qvarqvare II Jaqeli, like his father he fought against Royal house of Georgia for the independence of Samstkhe. In 1462 Qvarqvare II Jaqeli called against the king of Georgia Uzun Hasan, the leader of the Aq Qoyunlu. In 1465 he defeated Georgian King George VIII at the battle near Paravani lake and separated from Georgia. He also participated in the Georgian civil war, after which United Georgian monarchy fell. Qvarqvare's independent reign was marked by warfare with the powerful Muslim states that surrounded the principality. The Aq Qoyunlu launched major attacks in 1466, 1476–1477 and 1485 and from 1479 the Ottoman Empire started to encroach on the territories. In 1479 he ravaged the land around Erzurum, reducing the city to tributary status. Unlike his father Kaikhosro I held peace with the other Georgian kingdoms (Kartli, Kakheti and Imereti). Kaikhosro with King Alexander I of Kakheti and Constantine of Kartli agreed to assist first Safavid shah Ismail to destroy Aq Koyunlu rule in Persia.

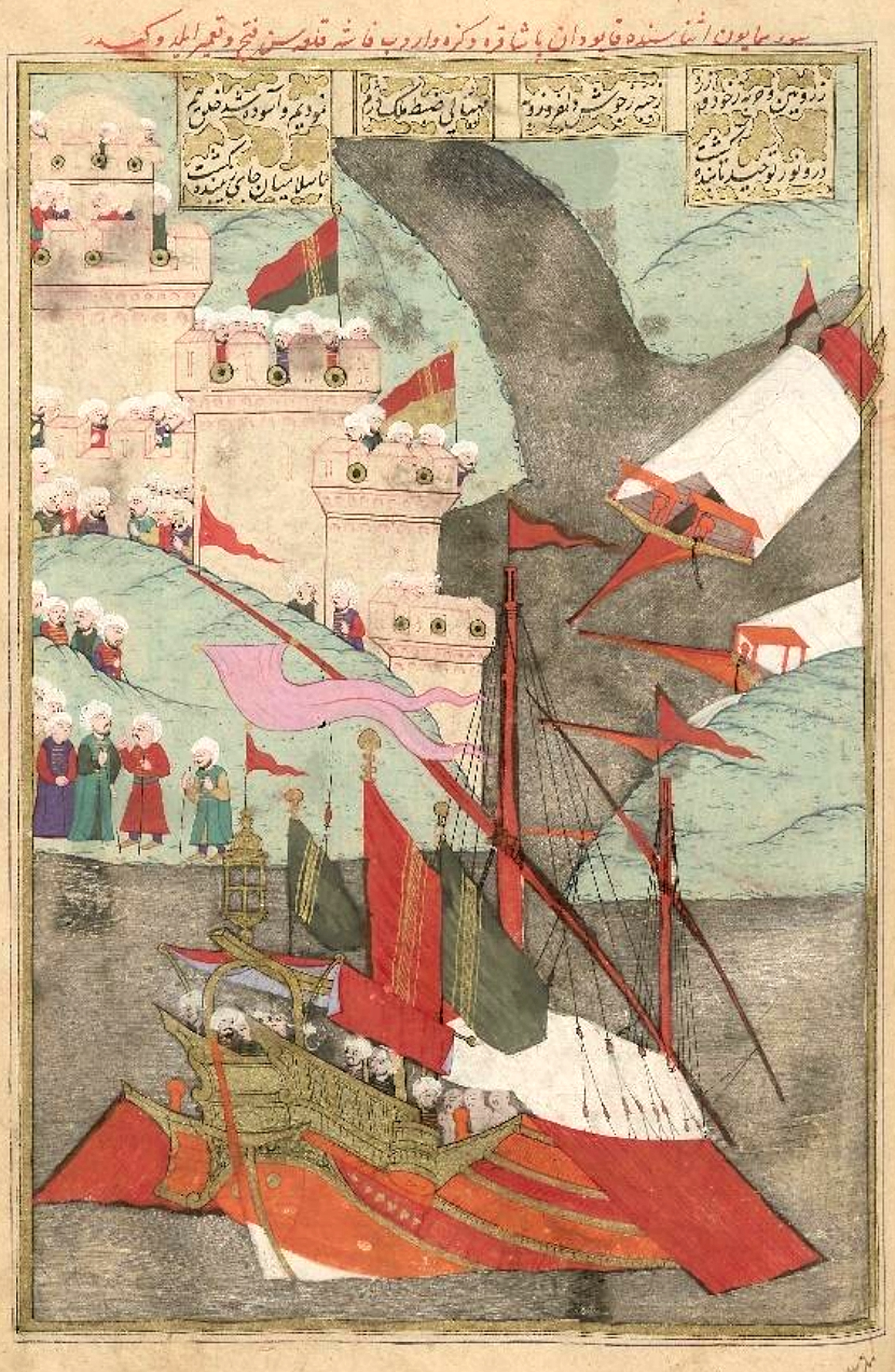
Ali Pasha's conquest of Poti (Faş) Castle and repair of the castle in 1578-1579 during the Ottoman–Safavid War (1578–1590). Şahanşahname (TSKM B.200, 1592)

When Qvarqvare II's son Kaikhosro I died two years after he ascended the throne, and was succeeded by his equally pious brother Mzetchabuk, like his father and grandfather, Mzetchabuk demanded the separation of the Meskhetian church from the Georgian Orthodox church. Atabeg Mzetchabuk Strived to strengthen Samtskhe. He nominally obeyed Ottoman sultan Selim I and with his help Adjara came fully under Meskhetian rule. In 1515 old Mzetchabuk abdicated and became a monk, received a monastic name Jacob. After Mzetchabuk Atabeg's title would be given to his nephew Qvarqvare, the son of Kaikhosro I, but Mzetchabuk's younger brother Manuchar rebelled against him. During his brief reign Manuchar sent many gifts to the Ottoman sultan Selim I and claimed himself as an admirer of Ottomans. In 1518 the new revolt started. Prince Qvarqvare with the help of Safavid troops attacked Samtskhe. Manuchar was overthrown and Qvarqvare became the new ruler of Meskheti. After this Manuchar asked his suzerain Sultan Selim for help of which Sultan Selim then gave him a huge army. Manuchar had tried to restore himself as Atabeg, but was defeated by Qvarqvare's forces at the battle near Erzurum.

Samtskhe-Saatabago was abolished in years 1535-1545 and carved up between the Kingdoms of Kartli and Imereti

During Qvarqvare III's reign Persian influence on Samtskhe was growing day by day. Because of that Ottomans greatly damaged the country and especially its southwestern region. Meskhetian lords had recognized that under Qvarqvare's rule Samtskhe would finally turn to the Enemy's hands. They made an alliance with the Georgian kings, Bagrat III of Imereti and Luarsab I to end up Jaqelian rule and protect Samtskhe from dominant Muslim empires (Ottomans and Safavids). In 1535 King Bagrat III with help of prince Rostom Gurieli and Odishian allies invaded Samtskhe. He defeated and captured Qvarqvare III at the Battle of Murjakheti near Akhalkalaki. Georgians had annexed Principality of Samtskhe. Qvarqvare died in prison, while Rostom was awarded his share of Samtskhe: Adjara and Lazeti, long sought after by the Gurieli dynasty. A few years later, Qvarqvare's survived youngest son Kaikhosro II requested Ottomans to expel Imeretian and Kartlian forces from Samtskhe. The Ottomans retaliated with a major invasion: Bagrat and Rostom were victorious at Karagak in 1543, but decisively defeated, in 1545, at Sokhoista. Samtskhe became vassal of the Ottoman Empire. Qvarqvare III's descendants ruled Samtskhe-Saatabago (until 1628) and then Childir Eyalet until 1820s.

== Princes/Atabegs of Samtskhe ==
Atabeg/Prince	Reign	Notes
1. Sargis I	1268–1285	
2. Beka I	1285–1306	
3. Sargis II	1306–1334	
4. Qvarqvare I	1334–1361	
5. Beka II	1361-1391	(ruled with Shalva during 1372–1389)
6. Shalva	1372–1389	(co-ruler with Beka II)
7. Aghbugha I	1389–1395	(ruled with Beka II and Ivane II)
8. Ivane II	1391–1444	(from 1391 to 1395 ruled with Aghbugha I)
9. Aghbugha II	1444–1451	
10. Qvarqvare II	1451–1498	
11. Kaikhosro I	1498–1500	
12. Mzetchabuki	1500–1515	
13. Manuchar I	1515–1518	
14. Qvarqvare III	1518–1535	
15. Kaikhosro II	1545–1573	
16. Qvarqvare IV	1573–1581	
17. Manuchar II	1581–1607	
18. Manuchar III	1607–1625	
