= Beka I Jaqeli =

Georgian ruling prince

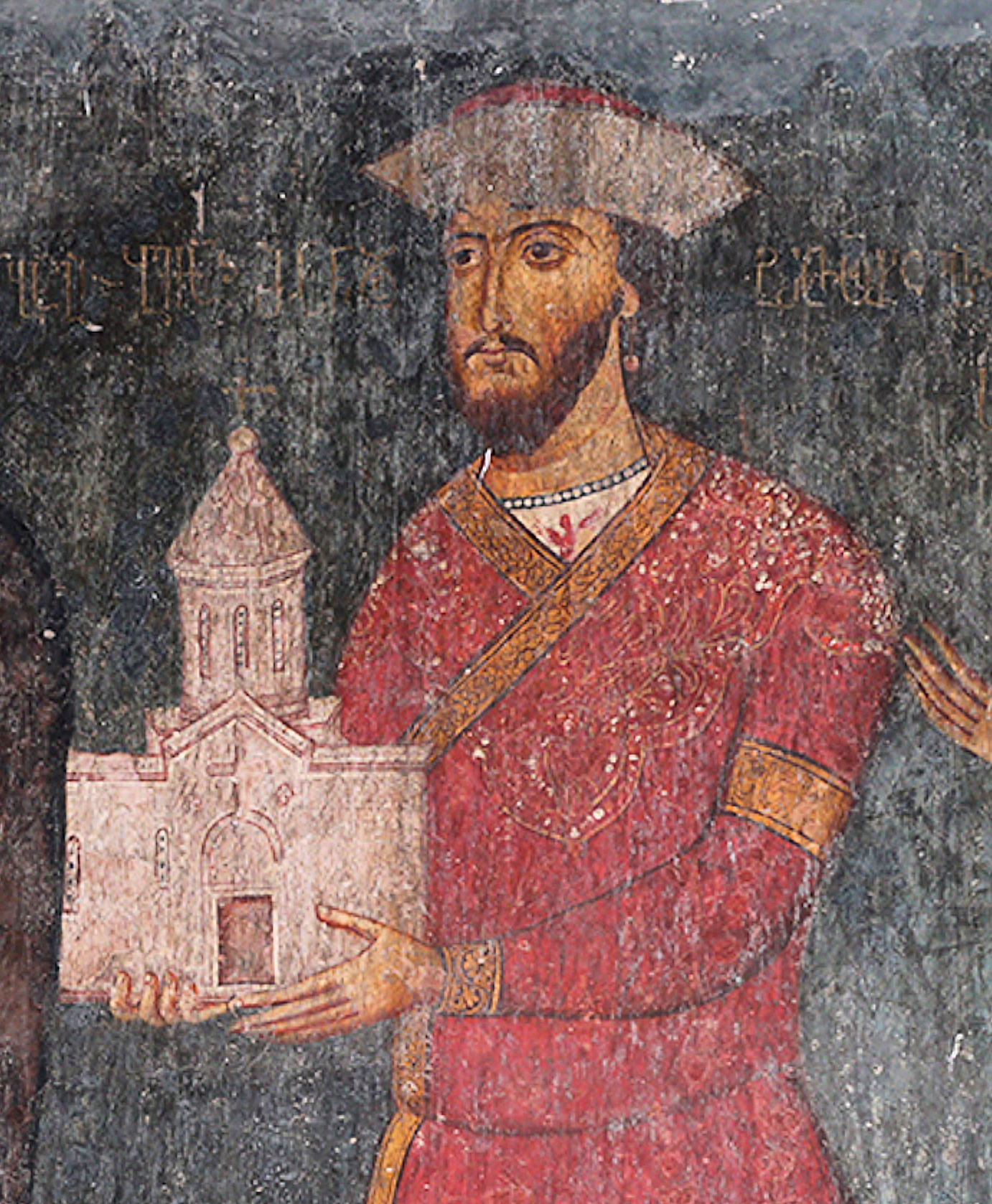
- Fresco of Beka I Jaqeli from the Sapara Monastery.

Atabeg of Samtskhe
- Reign: 1285–1308
- Predecessor: Sargis I Jaqeli
- Successor: Sargis II Jaqeli
- Born: c. 1242
- Died: 1308
- Spouse: Vakhakhi
- Issue: Sargis II; Qvarqvare; Shalva; Natela; Jiajak
- House: Jaqeli
- Father: Sargis I Jaqeli
- Religion: Georgian Orthodox Church

Beka I Jaqeli (Georgian: ბექა I ჯაყელი) (c. 1242 – 1308), of the House of Jaqeli, was a Georgian prince who ruled over (mtavari) the southern Georgian province of Samtskhe from 1285 to 1308.

== Biography ==
His principality included Samtskhe, Adjara, Shavsheti, Klarjeti, Lazia (Chaneti), Tao, Kola, Artaani and most of Javakheti. His realm stretched from Tashiskari (modern Khashuri District) to Karnu-kalaki (now Erzurum) and the Black Sea. During his reign, Samtskhe-Saatabago existed as a politically independent entity from the Georgian Kingdom.

Following the Mongol invasions of Georgia, the Jaqeli became vassals of the Ilkhanate, and Beka paid regular tributes to them. Paintings of the House of Jaqeli during the period show them wearing clothes decorated with the cloud collars made of pearl embroidery, a design of Mongol Ilkhanate origin.

Despite being independent, Samtskhe still maintained some kind of relations with Georgia and Beka himself was given a title of Mandaturukhutsesi (the elder - first in rank - Mandator) by Georgian king.

At the time of Beka's rule, the Turks became more active the Southwest borders, from the Sultanate of Rum. After a series of invasions, he managed to fend off the attacks.

Beka was a supporter of maintaining Georgian political influence over the Empire of Trebizond. For this cause, he married off his daughter Jiajak to the Trapezuntine Emperor Alexios II. Another daughter of Beka, - Natela, became the consort of Demetrius II of Georgia and bore him a son and the successor to the throne. After the execution of his father Demetrius by Mongols, future king George V was raised by his grandfather at his court.

== Family ==
Beka I Jaqeli was married to Vakhakhi. The children of Beka were:

- Sargis II, Atabeg of Samtskhe from 1308 to 1334.
- Qvarqvare.
- Shalva.
- Natela, who married Demetrius II of Georgia, and was the mother of George V of Georgia.
- Jiajak, who married Alexios II of Trebizond.

== Bibliography ==
- Toumanoff, Cyril (1976). Manuel de Généalogie et de Chronologie pour l'histoire de la Caucasie chrétienne (Arménie, Géorgie, Albanie) [Manual of Genealogy and Chronology of Christian Caucasian History (Armenia, Georgia, Albania)] (in French). Rome: Edizioni Aquila.

Beka I Jaqeli Jaqeli
Preceded by Sargis I	Prince of Meskheti; 1285-1308	Succeeded by Sargis II
