= House of Jaqeli =

Georgian ruling dynasty (800–1829 AD)

Jaqeli ჯაყელი
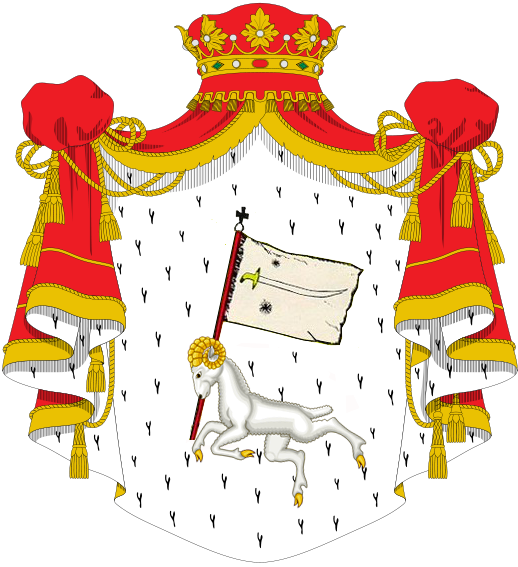
- Parent house: Chorchaneli
- Country: Meskheti (Georgia)
- Founded: 9th century
- Founder: Beshken Jaqeli
- Final ruler: Yusup III Jaqeli
- Titles: Prince Jaqeli; Mtavari of Samtskhe
- Estate: Principality of Samtskhe

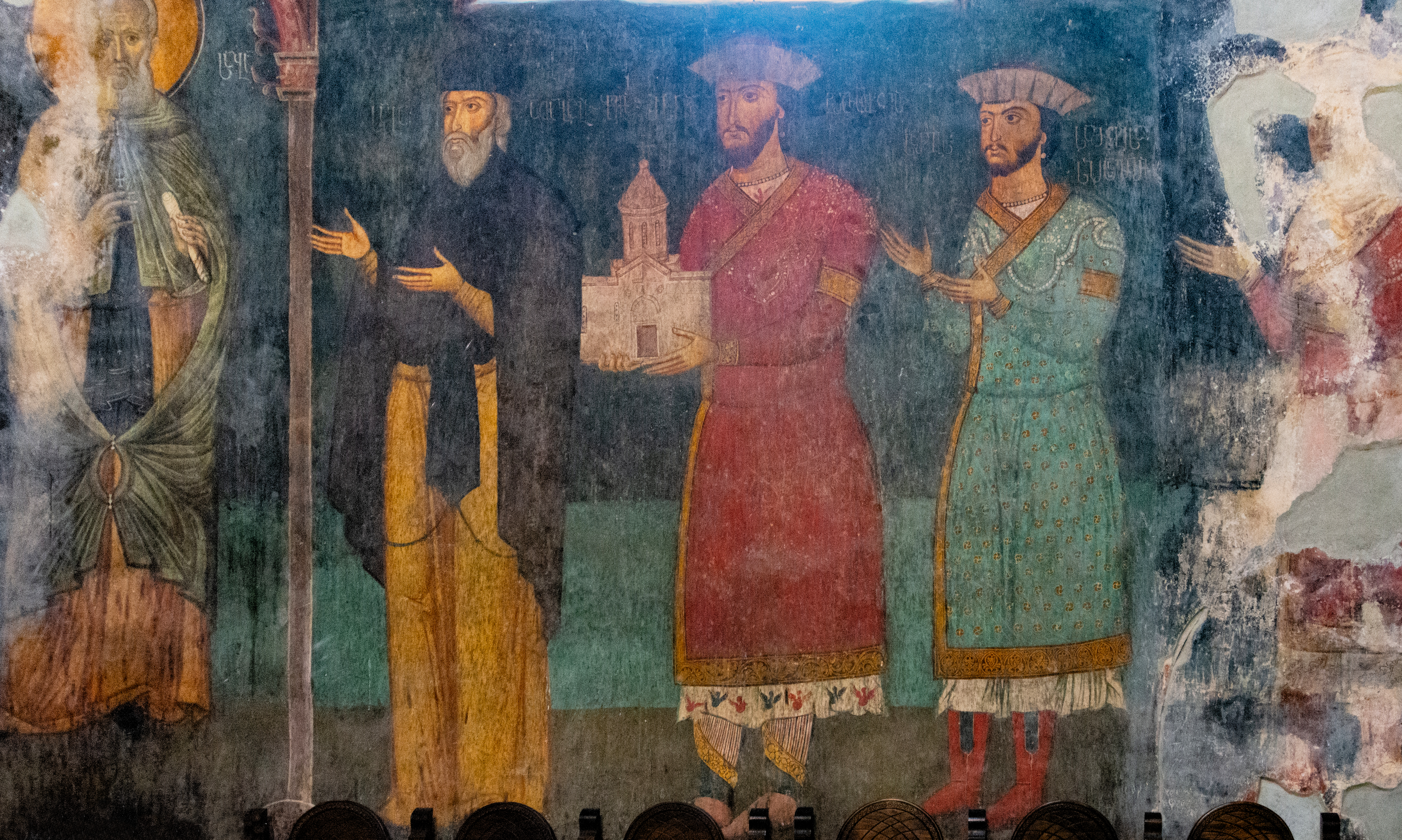
A group portrait of Princes Jaqeli (from left to right: Sargis I Jaqeli (Sabas), Beka, Sargis, and Kvarkvare). Sapara monastery, 14th c

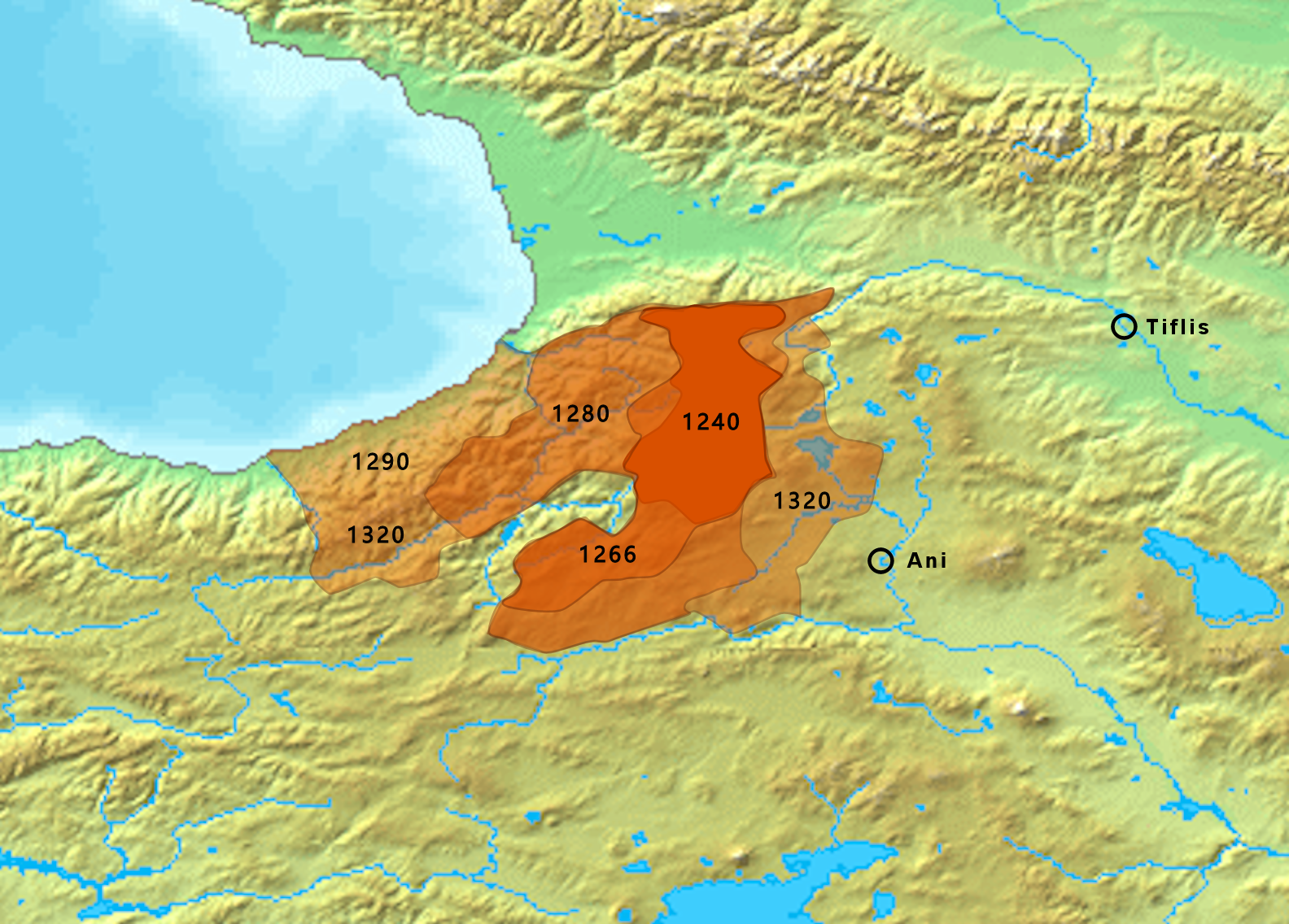
Map of Samtskhe (1240-1320), during the rule of the House of Jaqeli.

The House of Jaqeli (Georgian: ჯაყელი) was an old Georgian princely family (mtavari) and a ruling dynasty of the Principality of Samtskhe, an offshoot of the House of Chorchaneli.

== History ==
"Jaqeli", literally meaning "of/from Jaqi", was originally a territorial epithet. The family received this name from the castle of Jaqi on the Jaqis-tsqali, one of the left affluents of the Mtkvari (Kura) (now in Turkey). The Jaqeli traced their origin to the late 9th-century nobleman Beshken, of the Chorchaneli, whose descendants possessed the valleys of Jaqi, Postkhovi (modern Posof, Turkey), and Uraveli (near Akhaltsikhe, Georgia). The title "Jaqeli" first appears in the names of Beshken I, lord (eristavi) of Tukharisi, and Murvan, lord of Q'ueli and Beshken's possible son. Beshken II, Murvan's possible son, died fighting the Seljuk Turks in Javakheti in 1118. From the 1050s to the 1190s, the Jaqeli took part in several feudal uprisings against the Bagratid kings of Georgia.

Eventually, under the queen Tamar of Georgia (1184-1213), the family, in the person of Botso, fell in dishonor, and the title of Jaqeli as well as most of their possessions passed to their relatives of the House of Tsikhisjvari (Tsikhisjvreli), also a Chorchaneli offshoot. The dispossessed family of Botso Jaqeli came to be known as Botsosdze, last heard of with Memna, who died during the defense of Tbilisi against the Khwarezmid ruler Jalal ad-Din Manguberdi in 1226; and with his brother Botso.

With Ivane-Qvarqvare of Tsikhisjvari (fl. c. 1195-1247), enfeoffed by Queen Tamar of Botso's titles and possessions, the new line of the Jaqeli dynasty emerged. It attained, in the person of Sargis I (r. c. 1260-1285), to the hereditary principate of Samtskhe, and became de facto independent of the kings of Georgia under the protectorate of Mongol Ilkhanate in 1268. The residence of Jaqeli was established in Sapara, located in the Samtskhe–Javakheti region of Georgia.

In 1334, King George V of Georgia brought Samtskhe within the Georgian realm again, and bestowed his maternal uncle Sargis II Jaqeli (r. 1306-1334) with the dignity of atabag, which would become hereditary in the Jaqeli line down to the 17th century. Henceforth, the principality was known as Samtskhe-Saatabago, the latter part of this compound word meaning "of the atabags".

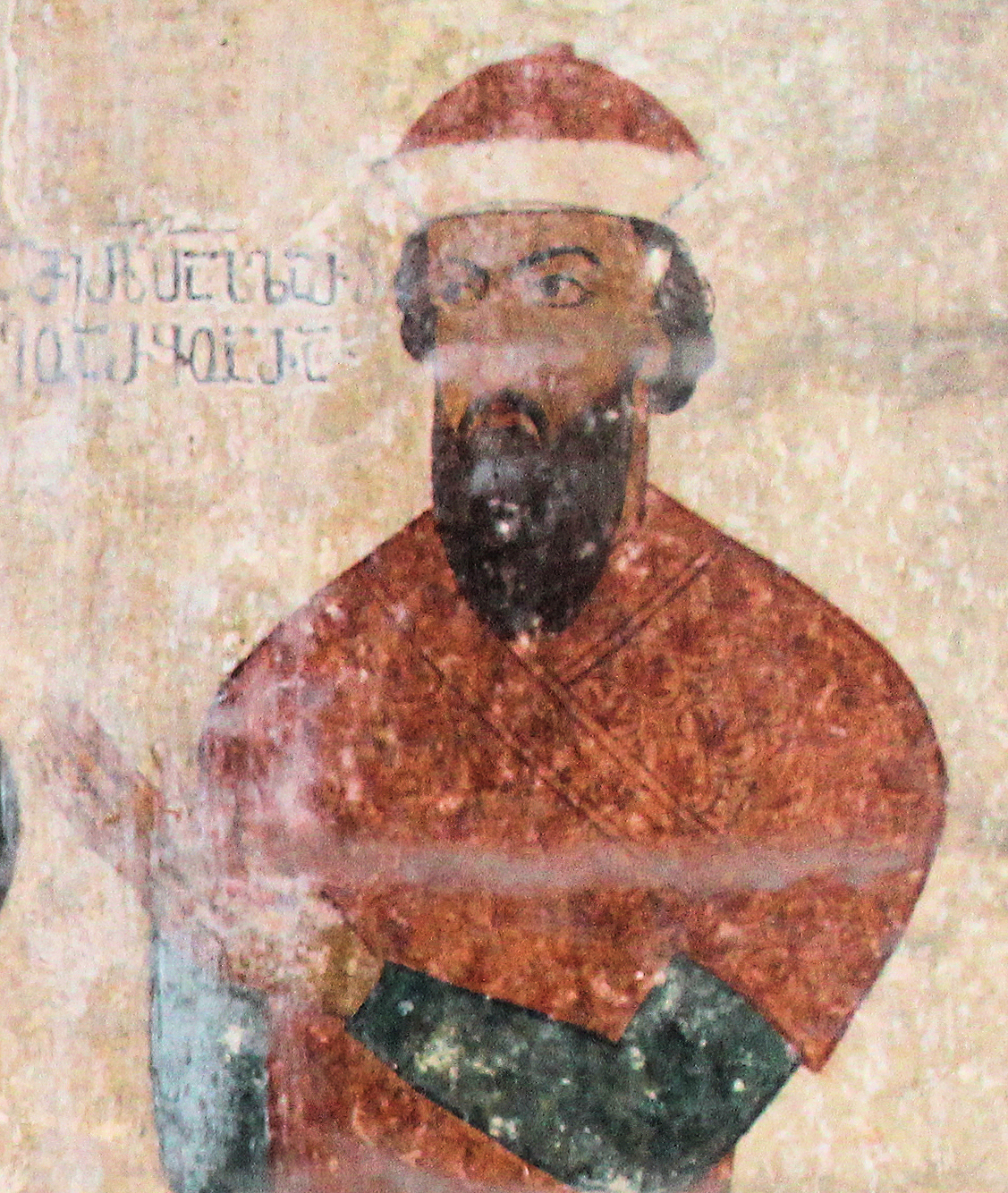
Qvarqvare I Jaqeli (r.1334–1361)

By the mid-15th century, the Jaqeli family had finally succeeded in reducing the rival noble families into vassalage or in driving them out of Samtskhe. By 1490/1491, when the Georgian kingdom finally dissolved into a number of weak and rivaling polities, the Jaqelis were among the most active contending factions, "not without responsibility for the failure to maintain the political unity of the nation", as the British scholar William Edward David Allen puts it. Beginning from 1578, Samtskhe became a target of Ottoman expansion, and the Jaqeli atabags, after a futile resistance, conveniently apostatized to Islam, and were made hereditary pashas of Akhaltsikhe, a position which they retained, with some brief intermissions, within the family throughout the unceasing wars between the Ottomans, the Iranian dynasties and the Georgian rulers down to the eventual Russian conquest in 1829 (see Battle of Akhalzic). A cadet branch, from the Kvabliani valley, accepted the Russian rule and assumed the surname of Atabekov-Kvabliansky.

Presently, there are 1526 people in Georgia of Jaqeli family.

== Genealogy ==
Genealogy of Jaqeli family

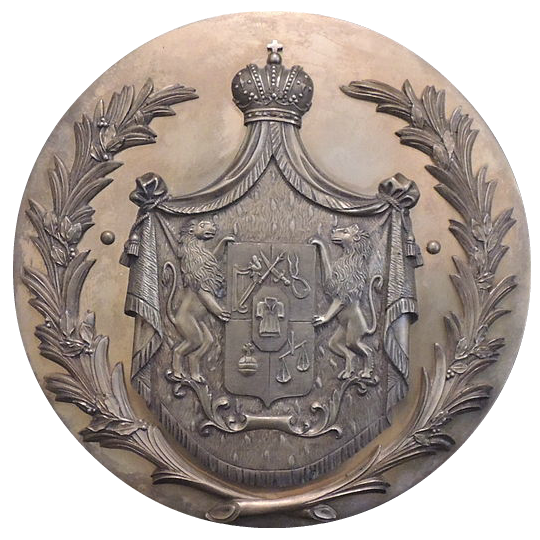
House of Jaqeli
Beshken
Memna
Beka
Sargis I Jaqeli
Beka I Jaqeli
Demetrius II of Georgia | Natela Jaqeli | Sargis II Jaqeli | Jiajak Jaqeli
George V of Georgia | Qvarqvare I Jaqeli
Bagrationi dynasty family tree | Ivane Jaqeli
Qvarqvare II Jaqeli
Kaikhosro I Jaqeli
Qvarqvare III Jaqeli
Kaikhosro II Jaqeli
Manuchar II Jaqeli
Manuchar III Jaqeli
Rostom I Jaqeli
Aslan I Jaqeli
Salim I Jaqeli
Isaq I Jaqeli
Yusup III Jaqeli

== See also ==
- Samtskhe-Saatabago
- Eyalet of Childir
- Meskhetians
