= Atabeg =

Hereditary title of nobility of Turkic origin

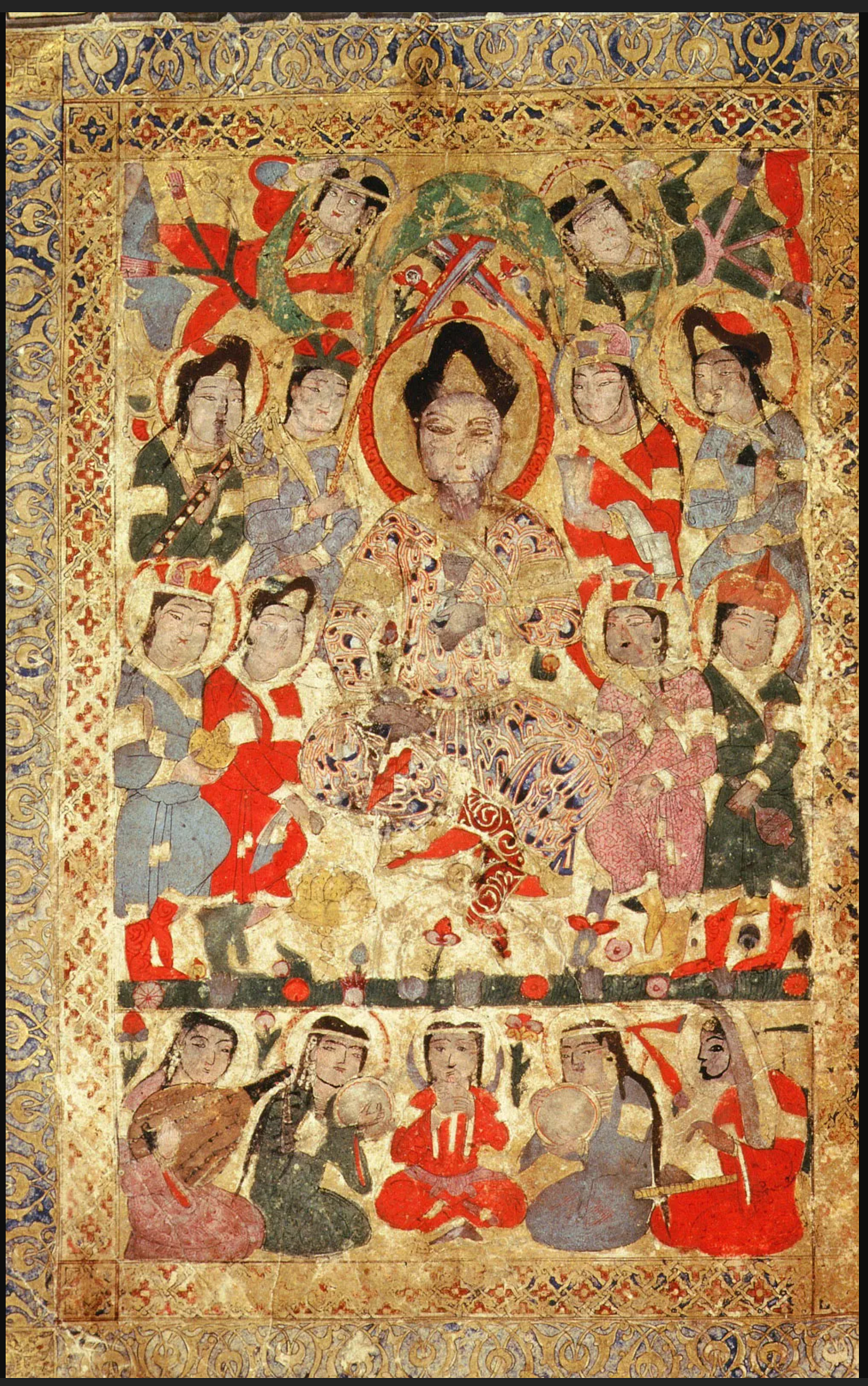
Badr al-Din Lu'lu' was atabeg for the Zengid dynasty from 1211 to 1234. Kitāb al-aghānī fronstispiece, Mosul, 1218–1219. Vol IV. Cairo, Egyptian National Library, Ms Farsi 579

Atabeg, Atabek, or Atabey is a hereditary title of nobility of Turkic origin, indicating a governor of a nation or province who was subordinate to a monarch and charged with raising the crown prince. The first instance of the title's use was with early Seljuk Turks who bestowed it on the Persian vizier Nizam al-Mulk. It was later used in the Kingdom of Georgia, first within the Armeno-Georgian family of Mkhargrdzeli as a military title and then within the house of Jaqeli as princes of Samtskhe.

== Title origins and meanings ==
The word atabeg is a compound of the Turkic word ata, "ancestor", or "father" and the word beg or bey, "lord, leader, prince". Beg is stated in some sources as being of Iranian origin (as in the compound Baghdad from bag/beg "lord" and dad "given"). However, according to Gerhard Doerfer, the word beg may have possibly been of Turkic origin – the origin of the word still remains disputed to this day. The term has no relation to the separate Turkic word elteber, despite their similar meanings and appearance.

The title Atabeg was common in the Seljuk rule of West Asia starting in the 12th century. It was also common in Mesopotamia (Iraq). When a Seljuk prince died, leaving minor heirs, a guardian would be appointed to protect and guide the young princes. These guardians would often marry their wards' widowed mothers, thus assuming a role similar to a surrogate father's. Amongst the Turkmen tribes, as in Persia, the rank was senior to a khan.

The title Atabeg was also in use for officers in Mamluk Egypt; some of them were proclaimed sultan before the incorporation into the Ottoman Empire. After the end of Seljuk rule, the title was used only intermittently.

When describing the Atabegs of Azerbaijan, the Ildeniz (Ildegoz) dynasty, the title Atabeg-e-Azam (Great Atabeg) was used, to denote their superior standing, power and influence on the Seljuk sultans.

In Persian, the style Atabek-e-Azam was occasionally used as an alternative title for the Shah's Vazir-e-Azam (Grand Vizier), notably in 1834–35 for Abol-Qasem Qa'em-Maqam, in 1848–51 for Amir Kabir, in 1906–07 for Mirza Ali Asghar Khan Amin al-Soltan, and finally in 1916 for a Qajar prince, Major-General Abdol Majid Mirza.

== List of Atabeg dynasties and other dynasties who used the title ==
- Ahmadilis (Atabegs of Maragha) (of Turkic origin)
- Eldiguzids (Atabegs of Azerbaijan) (of Kypchaq Turkic origin)
- Salghurids (Atabegs of Fars) (of Turkmen origin)
- Hazaraspids (Atabegs of Luristan) (of Iranian origin)
- Atabegs of Yazd (of Iranian origin)
- Zengids (Atabegs of Mosul) (of Turkmen origin)

== Atabeg dynasties ==
=== In West Asia ===
Beginning in the 12th century, the atabegs formed a number of dynasties, and displaced the descendants of the Seljukid emirs in their various principalities. These dynasties were founded by emancipated Mamluks, who had held high office at court and in camp under powerful emirs. When the emirs died, they first became stadtholders for the emirs' descendants, and then usurped the throne of their masters. There was an atabeg dynasty in Damascus founded by Toghtekin (1103–1128).

Other atabeg "kingdoms" sprang up to the north east, founded by Sokman (Sökmen), who established himself at Kaifa in Diyarbakır about 1101, and by his brother Ilghazi. The city of Mosul was under Mawdud ibn Altuntash, and was later ruled by atabegs such as Aksunkur and Zengi. Zengi became Atabeg of Mosul in 1128 and soon established himself as an independent ruler of much of northern Mesopotamia and Syria (including Aleppo).

The northern part of Luristan, formerly known as Lurikuchik ('Little Luristan'), was governed by independent princes of the Khurshidi dynasty, styled atabegs, from the beginning of the 17th century when the last atabeg, Shah Verdi Khan, was removed by Persian Shah Abbas the Great and the government of the province given to Husain Khan, the chief of a rival tribe. Husain, however, was given the gubernatorial title of vali instead of atabeg. The descendants of Husain Khan retained the title.

Great Luristan, in the southern part of Luristan, was an independent state under the Fazlevieh atabegs from 1160 until 1424. Its capital was Idaj, now only represented by mounds and ruins at Malamir.

=== In the Caucasus ===
In the Kingdom of Georgia, atabeg (Georgian: ათაბაგი, romanized: atabagi) was one of the highest court titles created by Queen Tamar of Georgia in 1212 for her powerful subjects of the Mkhargrdzeli family. The atabeg of Georgia was a vizier and a Lord High Tutor to Heir Apparent. Not infrequently, the office of atabeg was combined with that of amirspasalar (commander-in-chief). In 1334, the title became hereditary in the Jaqeli family who ruled the Principality of Samtskhe. Therefore, this entity came to be denominated as Samtskhe-Saatabago, the latter element meaning "of the atabags".
