= Mtavari =

Feudal Georgian title

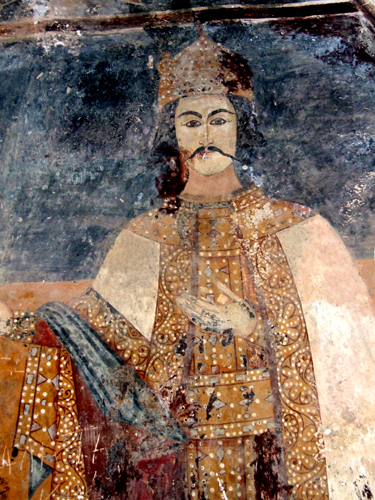
Mtavari Levan II.

Mtavari (Georgian: მთავარი) was a feudal title in Georgia usually translated into English as Prince or Duke.

== History ==
The earliest instances of the use of mtavari are in the early Georgian hagiographic texts dated to the 5th century. From the 11th to the 14th centuries, the title mtavari, along with tavadi, was synonymous with eristavi, and all referred to one of the upper nobles, a prince. Throughout the Golden Age of the Kingdom of Georgia (12th-13th centuries), the title gradually changed from conditional to hereditary tenure, a process completed only at the end of the 15th century. In the 15th century the term mtavari was applied only to the five ruling princes of western Georgia (Samtskhe, Mingrelia, Guria, Svaneti, and Abkhazia), whose autonomous powers were finally eliminated under Imperial Russia.

== See also ==
- List of Georgian princes (mtavars)
