= Meskheti =

Coordinates: 41°35′N 43°16′E

Meskheti/Samtskhe მესხეთი/სამცხე
- Historical Region
- Map highlighting the historical region of Meskheti in Georgia
- Country: Georgia
- Mkhare: Samtskhe-Javakheti
- Capital: Akhaltsikhe
- Meskheti is not an official subdivision of the Georgia; it constitutes a historical region only.

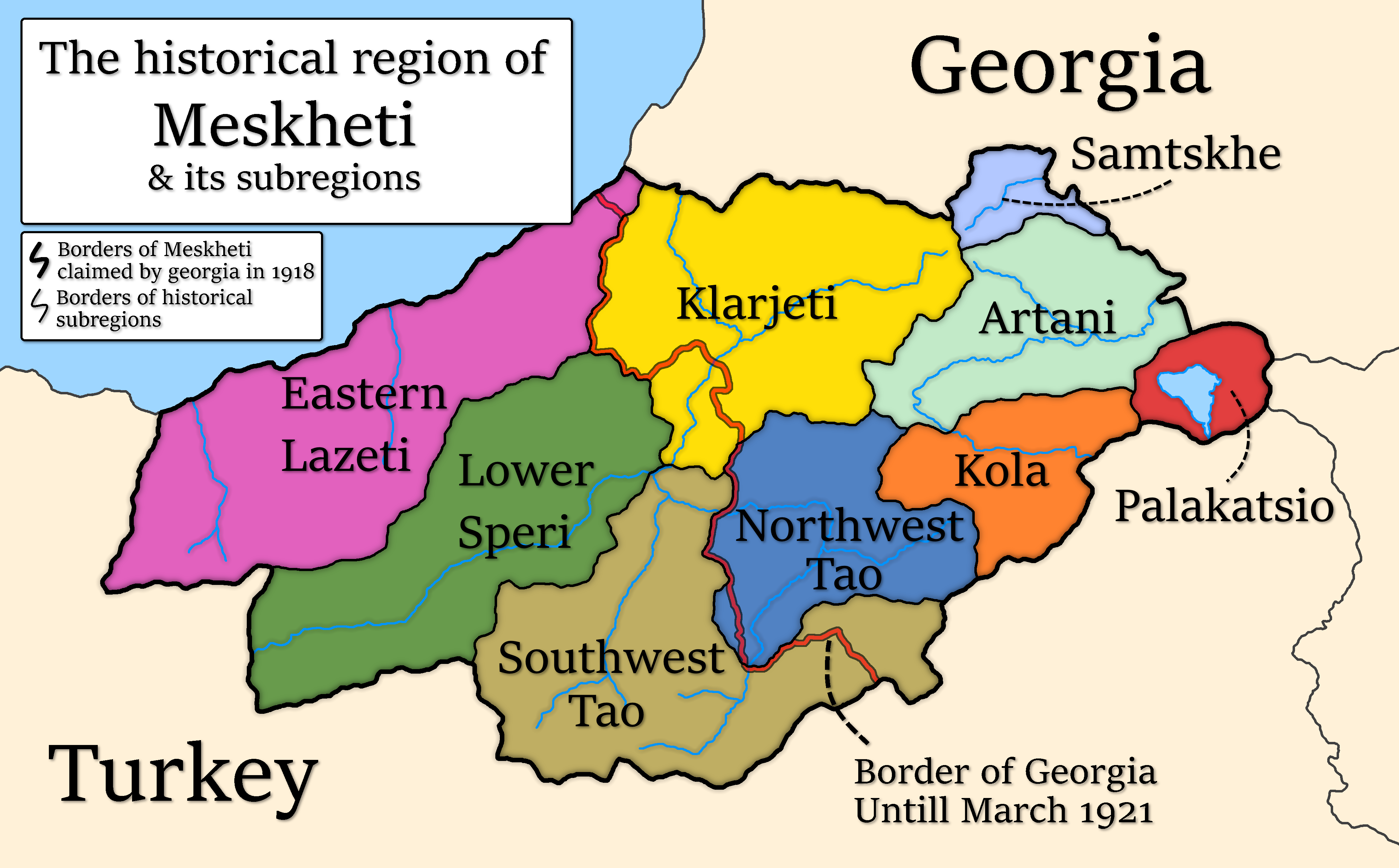
Map of The historical Georgian region of Meskheti, showing the subregions, the former border of Georgia and large rivers.

Meskheti (Georgian: მესხეთი [me̞s̪χe̞t̪ʰi], Turkish: Meshetya) or Samtskhe (Georgian: სამცხე [s̪ämt̪͡s̪ʰχe̞]), also known as Moschia in ancient sources, is a mountainous area in southwestern Georgia.

== History ==
Historical Meskheti in the 8th-10th centuries

The ancient tribe of Meskhetians were among the earliest known inhabitants of the modern Samtskhe-Javakheti region.

Between the 2nd millennium BC and the 4th century BC, Meskheti was part of the kingdom of Diauehi. It subsequently became part of the Kingdom of Iberia, remaining so until the 6th century.

From the 10th to the 15th centuries, the region was part of the Kingdom of Georgia. In the 16th century, it became part of the independent Principality of Samtskhe until it was occupied and annexed by the Ottoman Empire.

From 1829 to 1917, the region was part of the Tiflis Governorate, and from 1918 to 1921, it was briefly part of the Democratic Republic of Georgia. From 1921 to 1990, it was part of the Soviet Union, as the Georgian SSR.

Today, Meskheti is part of the Samtskhe-Javakheti region, together with Javakheti and Tori.

== Demographics ==
=== Ethnic groups ===
==== Georgians ====
Meskhetians or Meskhs (Meskhi) are an ethnographic subgroup of Georgians who speak the Meskhetian dialect of the Georgian language, which, among Georgia's regional dialects, is relatively close to Standard Georgian. Meskhetians are the indigenous population of Meskheti, a historical region in southern Georgia. Today, they are predominantly followers of the Georgian Orthodox Church, while some are Catholics. Today, approximately 70,000 Georgians live in the region.

==== Meskhetian Turks ====
Meskhetian Turks are the former inhabitants of the Meskheti region of Georgia along the border with Turkey. They were deported to Central Asia during November 15–25, 1944 by Joseph Stalin and settled within Kazakhstan, Kyrgyzstan, and Uzbekistan. Of the 120,000 forcibly deported in cattle-trucks a total of 10,000 perished. In 1989, they were forced to flee Central Asia due to pogroms. Today they are dispersed over a number of other countries of the former Soviet Union. There are 500,000 to 700,000 Meskhetian Turks in exile in Azerbaijan and Central Asia. Most Meskhetian Turks are Sunni Muslims.

== See also ==
- History of Georgia
- Culture of Georgia
- Meshech

== Literature ==
- Takaishvili, Ekvtime (1907). არქეოლოგიური ექსპედიცია კოლა-ოლთისში და ჩანგლში (in Georgian). Tflis.
- Lomsadze, Shota (1975). სამცხე ჯავახეთი (XVIII ს. შუაწლებიდან XIX საუკუნის შუა წლებამდე). Tbilisi.
- Muskhelishvili, David (1983). "მესხეთი". Georgian Soviet Encyclopedia (in Georgian). Vol. 6. Tbilisi. pp. 601–602.
- Nozadze, Viktor (1989). საქართველოს აღდგენისათვის ბრძოლა მესხეთის გამო (PDF) (in Georgian). Tbilisi: Union of Georgian Theatre Workers.
