= Abastumani (disambiguation) =

Abastumani is a small town in Georgia.

Abastumani may also refer to:

- Abastumani (Adigeni municipality), a village in Adigeni municipality, Georgia
- 1390 Abastumani, a minor planet
