= Didi Zanavi =

Didi Zanavi დიდი ზანავი
- Village
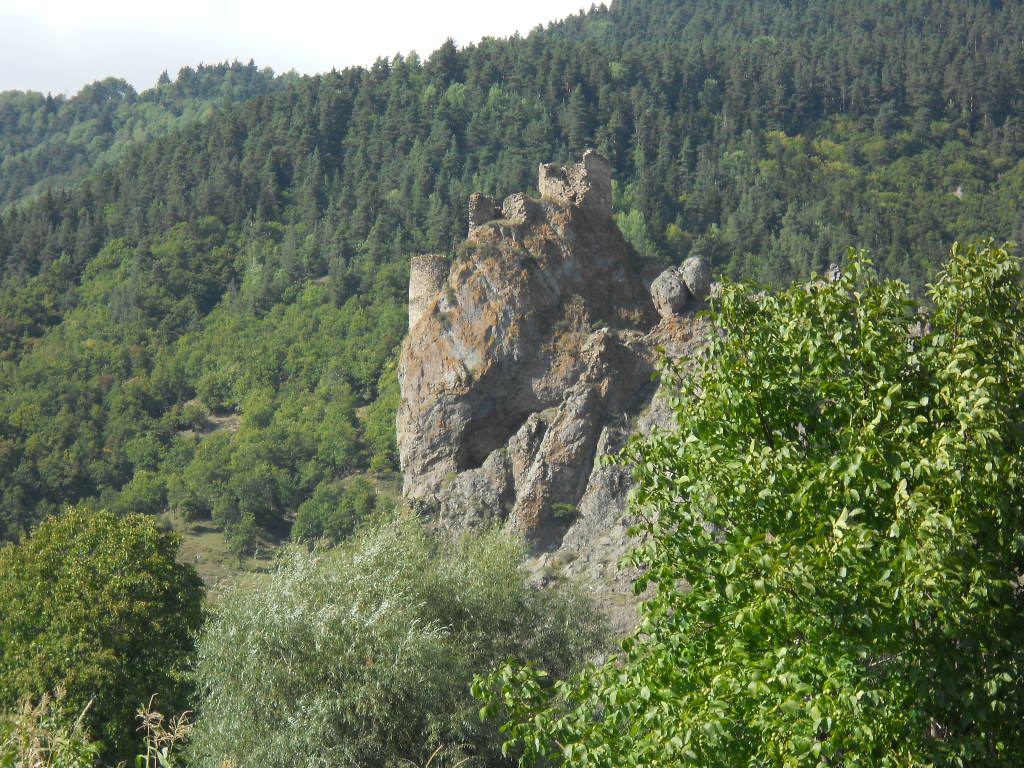
- Zanavi fortress

- Location of Didi Zanavi
- Coordinates: 41°41′44″N 42°43′37″E
- Country: Georgia
- Region: Samtskhe-Javakheti
- Municipality: Adigeni
- Elevation: 1,480 m (4,860 ft)

Population (2014)
  - Total: 297
- Time zone: UTC+4 (Georgian Time)

Didi Zanavi (Georgian: დიდი ზანავი) is a village in the Adigeni Municipality in Georgia's southern region Samtskhe-Javakheti. It is located on the southern slope of the Meskheti Range, part of the Lesser Caucasus, on the left bank of the small river Kvabliani, 1480 metres above sea level. The village lies 4 km northeast of Adigeni, the municipality's chief town, and itself serves as a center of the Zanavi territorial unit. As of the 2014 census, the village had a population of 297.

Didi Zanavi is home to the Zanavi fortress and the Zanavi church, two medieval monuments inscribed on the registry of Immovable Cultural Monuments of National Significance of Georgia in 2007.

== History ==
The village was historically known as Zanavi, the name it shared with several other settlements in Georgia. It is first mentioned in the 9th–10th-century hagiographic text, the Vita of Saint Seraphion of Zarzma, authored by Basil of Zarzma, as lying in the estates of Giorgi Chorchaneli, a great noble of Samtskhe. This Giorgi commissioned a monastery from Amaspo and Kurdia and was buried there on his death. In 1578, the village, along with other southwestern Georgian lands, were conquered by the Ottoman Empire. As of 1595, there were two villages called Zanavi in the area—the "upper" and the "lower" one—both part of the Ude nahiye of the Akhaltsikhe sanjak. The villagers became Muslim during more than 250 years of the Ottoman rule and, as part of the "Meskhetian Turk" group, were deported to Central Asia from Soviet Georgia in 1944. The vacated village was resettled by newcomers from the western Georgian regions of Imereti and Racha.

== Population ==
As of the 2014 national census, Vartsikhe had a population of 297. Most of them (99.3%) are ethnic Georgians.

Population	2002 census	2014 census
Total	332	297

== Monuments ==
The western end of Didi Zanavi contains a medieval fortress standing on a steep rock which is difficult to access. Its rampart is built of rocks and lime and bears the evidence of a later reconstruction. The main structure of the citadel is a three-storey tower with a rounded rear, with arrowslits on all sides and an oven on the second floor. The arched doorway in the southern walls leads to a courtyard, which contains a rock-cut water pool. Further south, there are two towers, one of them with the remnants of a church within it. Across a small stream, there is a congregational mosque built in 1927 on the place where once a Christian church—survived as pilaster capitals and a stone plate with the cross in a two-tier frame—stood.

Some 2 km north of the village, upstream the Zanavi, there are the ruins of a medieval church, probably the same monastery that is mentioned in the vita of St. Seraphion of Zarzma. A scattered pile of richly ornate stones once decorated a large church building the façades of which were enclosed in blocks of hewn stone. The entire monastery once contained several accessory structures and was surrounded by a fortified wall.
