= Tutajvari =

Tutajvari (Georgian: თუთაჯვარი) was a village in the present-day Adigeni Municipality, in Samtskhe–Javakheti region of Georgia. The village was depopulated following the 1944 deportation of Muslims from the Meskheti region, and in 1949 it was legally abolished as a village.

== History ==
The name Tutajvari (თუთაჯვარი) derives from the Georgian name Tskutajvari (წყუთაჯვარი), which evolved from Tskviltajvari (წყვილთაჯვარი), meaning "double cross".

The area where Tutajvari, a Georgian settlement, was located came under Ottoman control in 1578. The village's church, the ruins of which have survived to the present day, must have been built before that date. In the Ottoman detailed register of 1595, the village is recorded as "Zughutajvari" (زوغوتة جواری). At that time, the village belonged to the Otshe nahiye of the Akhaltsikhe sanjak and was recorded as uninhabited.

Following the Russo-Turkish War (1828–1829), Tutajvari came under the control of the Russian Empire. The village had been resettled by the time of the 1886 Russian census, in which it was recorded under the name "Цхутаджвари" (Tskhutajvari). At that time, the village was located within Akhaltsikhe Uyezd and consisted of 11 households. Its population was recorded as 65 people, comprising 40 men and 25 women. With the exception of two Russians living in one household, the inhabitants were recorded as "Tatars", a term used in the census in the context of the Muslim population.

In the 1930s, Tutajvari formed the Tsakhnisi village soviet together with the villages of Kikineti (ქიქინეთი), Tsakhani (წახანი), Churchuto (ჩურჩუტო) and Tsakhnistsqaro (წახნისწყარო). In 1944, the village's Muslim population was deported to Central Asia. On 2 August 1949, the Presidium of the Supreme Soviet of the Georgian SSR adopted a resolution abolishing the village status of Tutajvari and Churchuto on the grounds that their inhabitants had moved elsewhere. The former settlement area of Tutajvari is now within the boundaries of Kikineti village.
