= Chikheli =

Former village in Adigeni Municipality, Georgia

Chikheli ჭიხელი
- Former village
- Country: Georgia
- Region: Samtskhe–Javakheti
- Municipality: Adigeni Municipality
- First documented: 1595
- Abolished as a village: 1949

Population (1886)
  - Total: 151

Chikheli (Georgian: ჭიხელი) was a village in the Samtskhe–Javakheti region of Georgia, within the boundaries of present-day Adigeni Municipality. The village was depopulated following the 1944 deportation of Muslims from Meskheti. In 1949, it was officially abolished as a village.

== History ==
The area where Chikheli, a Georgian settlement, was located came under Ottoman rule in 1578. The ruins of Chikheli Church (ჭიხელის ეკლესია), the village's church, have survived to the present day; it must have been built before that date. In the 1595 Ottoman detailed cadastral register, the village was recorded as "Chikhil" (چخیل) and belonged to the Otshe nahiye of the Akhaltsikhe sanjak. Its population consisted of 10 Christian households, whose heads bore Georgian names such as Kakala, Petre, Abiatar, Vardzel, and Mikender. The inhabitants cultivated wheat, barley, rye, and millet, practised beekeeping, and raised sheep and pigs.

Following the Russo-Turkish War of 1828–1829, Chikheli came under the control of the Russian Empire. In the 1886 Russian census, it was recorded as "Чихелъ" (Chikhel). At the time, the village was located in Akhaltsikhe Uyezd and consisted of 18 households. Its population was recorded as 151 people, including 91 men and 60 women. The inhabitants were recorded as "Tatars" (Татары).

In the 1930s, Chikheli was a village within the Varkhani village soviet. In 1944, its Muslim population was deported to Central Asia. On 2 August 1949, the Supreme Soviet of the Georgian SSR adopted a resolution abolishing Chikheli's status as a village on the grounds that its inhabitants had moved elsewhere. The former settlement site of Chikheli is now within the boundaries of Kikineti village.
