= 1902 Shaposhnikov =

Dark Hilda asteroid

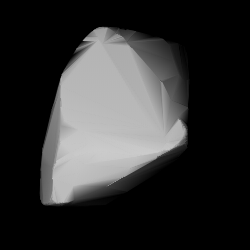
- Shaposhnikov modeled from its lightcurve

Discovery
- Discovered by: T. Smirnova
- Discovery site: Crimean Astrophysical Obs.
- Discovery date: 18 April 1972

Designations
- Pronunciation: /ʃəˈpɒʃnɪkɒv/
- Named after: Vladimir Shaposhnikov (Soviet astronomer)
- Alternative designations: 1972 HU · 1940 GK; 1941 MC · 1950 TD_{4} 1951 WY_{1} · 1951 YD; 1958 TP_{1} · 1958 VB; 1959 XA · 1972 JA
- Minor planet category: main-belt · (outer); Hilda · background

Orbital characteristics
- Epoch 4 September 2017 (JD 2458000.5)
- Uncertainty parameter 0
- Observation arc: 77.07 yr (28,149 days)
- Aphelion: 4.8450 AU
- Perihelion: 3.0853 AU
- Semi-major axis: 3.9651 AU
- Eccentricity: 0.2219
- Orbital period (sidereal): 7.90 yr (2,884 days)
- Mean anomaly: 186.17°
- Mean motion: 0° 7^{m} 29.28^{s} / day
- Inclination: 12.495°
- Longitude of ascending node: 59.315°
- Argument of perihelion: 268.16°

Physical characteristics
- Mean diameter: 83.443±1.723 km 89.24±33.98 km 91.60±1.54 km 96.86±3.2 km 97.01 km (derived)
- Synodic rotation period: 14 h (dated); 20.987±0.005 h (Note: Lightcurve plot of (1902) Shaposhnikov by Brian Warner (2017) at CS3. Rotation period of 20.987±0.005 hours. Quality Code of 2+. Summary figures at the LCDB); 20.9959±0.0005 h 21.2 h 21.34 h
- Geometric albedo: 0.0296±0.002; 0.034±0.001; 0.0385 (derived); 0.040±0.012; 0.04±0.05
- Spectral type: Tholen = X · P B–V = 0.729; U–B = 0.254
- Absolute magnitude (H): 9.22 · 9.29±0.27 · 9.51

1902 Shaposhnikov (prov. designation: 1972 HU) is a dark Hilda asteroid from the outermost region of the asteroid belt, approximately 92 kilometers in diameter. It was discovered on 18 April 1972, by Russian astronomer Tamara Smirnova at the Crimean Astrophysical Observatory in Nauchnyj, on the Crimean peninsula. The asteroid was named after Soviet astronomer and WWII casualty Vladimir Shaposhnikov. It was one of the last larger asteroids discovered in the main belt.

== Orbit and characteristics ==
Shaposhnikov belongs to the dynamic Hilda group. Members of this group stay in a 3:2 orbital resonance with the gas giant Jupiter and are located in the outermost part of the asteroid belt. Shaposhnikov is, however, not a member of the collisional Hilda family (001) but a non-family asteroid of the background population when applying the Hierarchical clustering method to its proper orbital elements. It orbits the Sun at a distance of 3.1–4.8 AU once every 7 years and 11 months (2,884 days; semi-major axis of 3.97 AU). Its orbit has an eccentricity of 0.22 and an inclination of 12° with respect to the ecliptic. The body's observation arc begins with its first observation as 1940 GK at Turku Observatory in April 1940, or 32 years prior to its official discovery observation at Nauchnyj.

== Naming ==
This minor planet was named in honour of Vladimir Grigorevich Shaposhnikov (1905–1942), who worked at the Simeiz Observatory and was an expert in astrometry, before he was killed on the Eastern Front during the Second World War. The official naming citation was published by the Minor Planet Center on 20 February 1976 (M.P.C. 3936).

== Physical characteristics ==
In the Tholen classification, Shaposhnikov is an X-type asteroid, which encompasses the E, M and P-types. Since its albedo is known to be very low, its spectral type has been refined to a primitive P-type asteroid. In addition, it has been characterized as a D-type asteroid in the Bus–DeMeo taxonomy.

=== Rotation period and poles ===
Several rotational lightcurves of Shaposhnikov have been obtained from photometric observations since 1989. Lightcurve analysis gave a consolidated rotation period of 21.2 hours with a brightness amplitude between 0.29 and 0.42 magnitude (U=2/2+/3). Most asteroid have periods below 20 hours.

A 2016-published study also modeled Shaposhnikov's lightcurve using photometric data from various sources. It gave a sidereal period of 20.9959 hours, as well as a spin axis in ecliptic coordinates (λ, β) of (326.0°, 37.0°) and (144.0°, 79.0°).

=== Diameter and albedo ===
According to the surveys carried out by the Infrared Astronomical Satellite IRAS, the Japanese Akari satellite and the NEOWISE mission of NASA's Wide-field Infrared Survey Explorer, Shaposhnikov measures between 83.443 and 96.86 kilometers in diameter and its surface has a low albedo between 0.0296 and 0.04.

The Collaborative Asteroid Lightcurve Link derives an albedo of 0.0385 and a diameter of 97.01 kilometers based on an absolute magnitude of 9.22.

Based on current diameter estimates, Shaposhnikov is the most recent discovered outer main-belt asteroid that is near the 100-kilometer diameter range. The next larger asteroid, 1390 Abastumani (101 km) was discovered in the 1930s, four decades earlier.
