= 1269 Rollandia =

Hildian asteroid

Discovery
- Discovered by: G. Neujmin
- Discovery site: Simeiz Obs.
- Discovery date: 20 September 1930

Designations
- Pronunciation: /rɒˈlændiə/
- Named after: Romain Rolland (French writer)
- Alternative designations: 1930 SH · 1926 GC_{1} 1931 VY · 1936 LE; 1961 PB · A902 EA; A906 SA · A907 WB; A918 EG
- Minor planet category: main-belt · (outer); Hilda · background

Orbital characteristics
- Epoch 27 April 2019 (JD 2458600.5)
- Uncertainty parameter 0
- Observation arc: 117.19 yr (42,804 d)
- Aphelion: 4.2910 AU
- Perihelion: 3.5136 AU
- Semi-major axis: 3.9023 AU
- Eccentricity: 0.0996
- Orbital period (sidereal): 7.71 yr (2,816 d)
- Mean anomaly: 352.88°
- Mean motion: 0° 7^{m} 40.44^{s} / day
- Inclination: 2.7586°
- Longitude of ascending node: 134.71°
- Argument of perihelion: 19.460°
- Jupiter MOID: 0.7004 AU
- T_{Jupiter}: 3.0550

Physical characteristics
- Mean diameter: 104.893±0.624 km 105.19±2.8 km 107.85±1.66 km
- Synodic rotation period: 17.36±0.01 h
- Geometric albedo: 0.045±0.002; 0.0473±0.003; 0.048±0.000
- Spectral type: Tholen = D B–V = 0.775; U–B = 0.271
- Absolute magnitude (H): 8.7; 8.82

1269 Rollandia, provisional designation 1930 SH, is a dark Hildian asteroid from the outermost region of the asteroid belt, approximately 105 kilometers (65 mi) in diameter. It was discovered on 20 September 1930, by Soviet astronomer Grigory Neujmin at the Simeiz Observatory on the Crimean peninsula. The asteroid was named after French writer Romain Rolland. The D-type asteroid has a rotation period of 17.4 hours. It was one of the last 100-kilometer sized asteroids discovered in the main belt.

== Orbit and classification ==
Rollandia is a member of the orbital Hilda group, which stay in a 3:2 orbital resonance with Jupiter and are located in the outermost main belt. It is however not a member of the collisional Hilda family (001) but a non-family asteroid of the background population when applying the hierarchical clustering method to its proper orbital elements.

Rollandia orbits the Sun at a distance of 3.5–4.3 AU once every 7 years and 9 months (2,816 days; semi-major axis of 3.9 AU). Its orbit has an eccentricity of 0.10 and an inclination of 3° with respect to the ecliptic. The asteroid was first observed as A902 EA at Heidelberg Observatory in March 1902. The body's observation arc also begins at Heidelberg in November 1917, with its observation as A907 WB, almost 13 years prior to its official discovery observation at Simeiz.

== Naming ==
This minor planet was named after French writer Romain Rolland (1866–1944), who was awarded the Nobel Prize in Literature in 1915 (see list). The official naming citation was mentioned in The Names of the Minor Planets by Paul Herget in 1955 (H 116).

== Physical characteristics ==
In the Tholen classification, Rollandia is a D-type asteroid. This spectral type is common among outermost asteroids and Jupiter trojans and is known for its very low albedo (see below).

=== Rotation period ===
In August 2016, a rotational lightcurve of Rollandia was obtained from photometric observations by Brian Warner, Robert Stephens and Dan Coley at the Center for Solar System Studies at Landers, California (U80−U82). Analysis gave a bimodal lightcurve with a rotation period of 19.98 hours and a low brightness amplitude of 0.06 magnitude. An alternative monomodal period solution of 9.99 hours is also possible, and becomes more likely if the object is nearly spheroidal (U=2). (Note: Lightcurve plot of (1269) Rollandia by Warner, Stephens Coley (2016) at CS3. Rotation period of 19.98±0.02 hours. Summary figures at LCDB) In April 2019, Warner re-visited the object an obtained a period of 17.36 hours. This result supersedes previous observations that gave a period of 15.32, 15.4 and 30.98 hours, respectively (U=2/2/2). (Note: Franco (2012) web: observation from 21 March 2012 gave a rotation period 15.4±0.1 hours with a brightness amplitude of 0.08±0.01 mag. Quality Code of 2. Summary figures for (1269) Rollandia at LCDB) (Note: Slyusarev (2012): observation from gave a rotation period 30.98±0.93 hours with a brightness amplitude of 0.02 mag. Summary figures for (1269) Rollandia at LCDB)

=== Diameter and albedo ===
According to the surveys carried out by the Japanese Akari satellite, the Infrared Astronomical Satellite IRAS, and the NEOWISE mission of NASA's Wide-field Infrared Survey Explorer, Rollandia measures between 104.893 and 107.85 kilometers in diameter and its surface has an albedo between 0.045 and 0.048.

The Collaborative Asteroid Lightcurve Link adopts the results obtained by IRAS, that is, an albedo of 0.0473 and a diameter of 105.19 kilometers based on an absolute magnitude of 8.82. Based on current estimates, Rollandia was the penultimate asteroid discovered in the outer asteroid belt that was larger than 100 kilometers. The last such body was 1390 Abastumani (101 km), discovered in 1935.
