= Theodor von Oppolzer =

Austrian astronomer and mathematician (1841–1886)

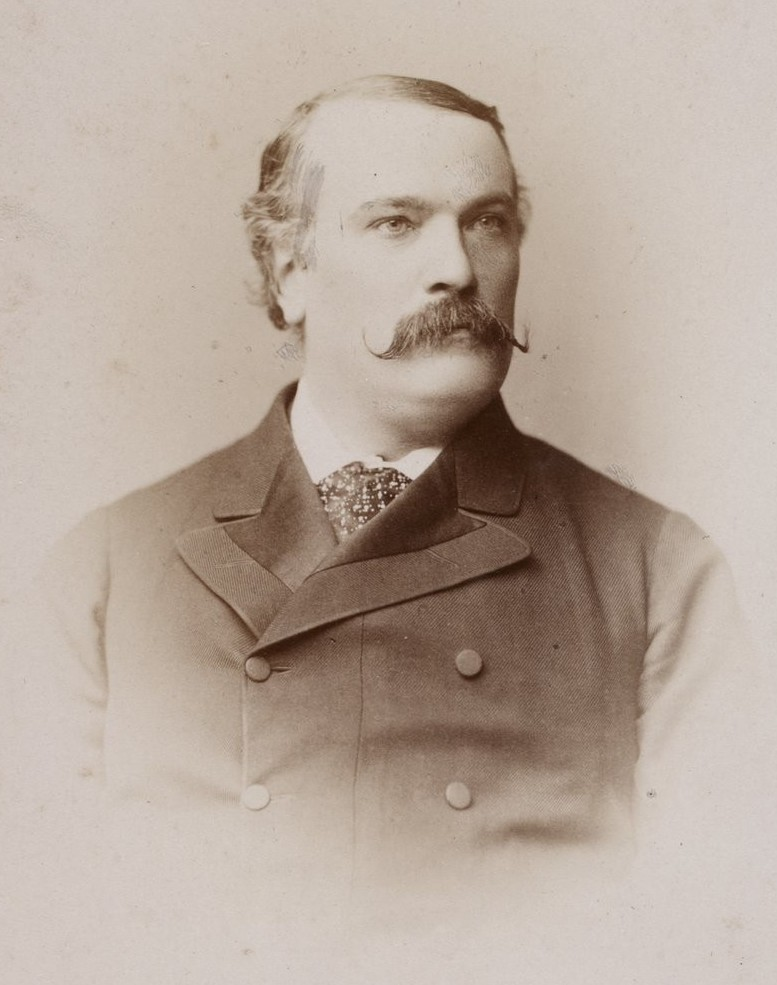
- Theodor von Oppolzer
- Born: 26 October 1841; Prague, Austrian Empire
- Died: 26 December 1886 (aged 45); Vienna, Austria-Hungary
- Education: University of Vienna
- Spouse: Coelestine Mautner von Markhof
- Children: 6
- Scientific career
- Fields: astronomer and mathematician

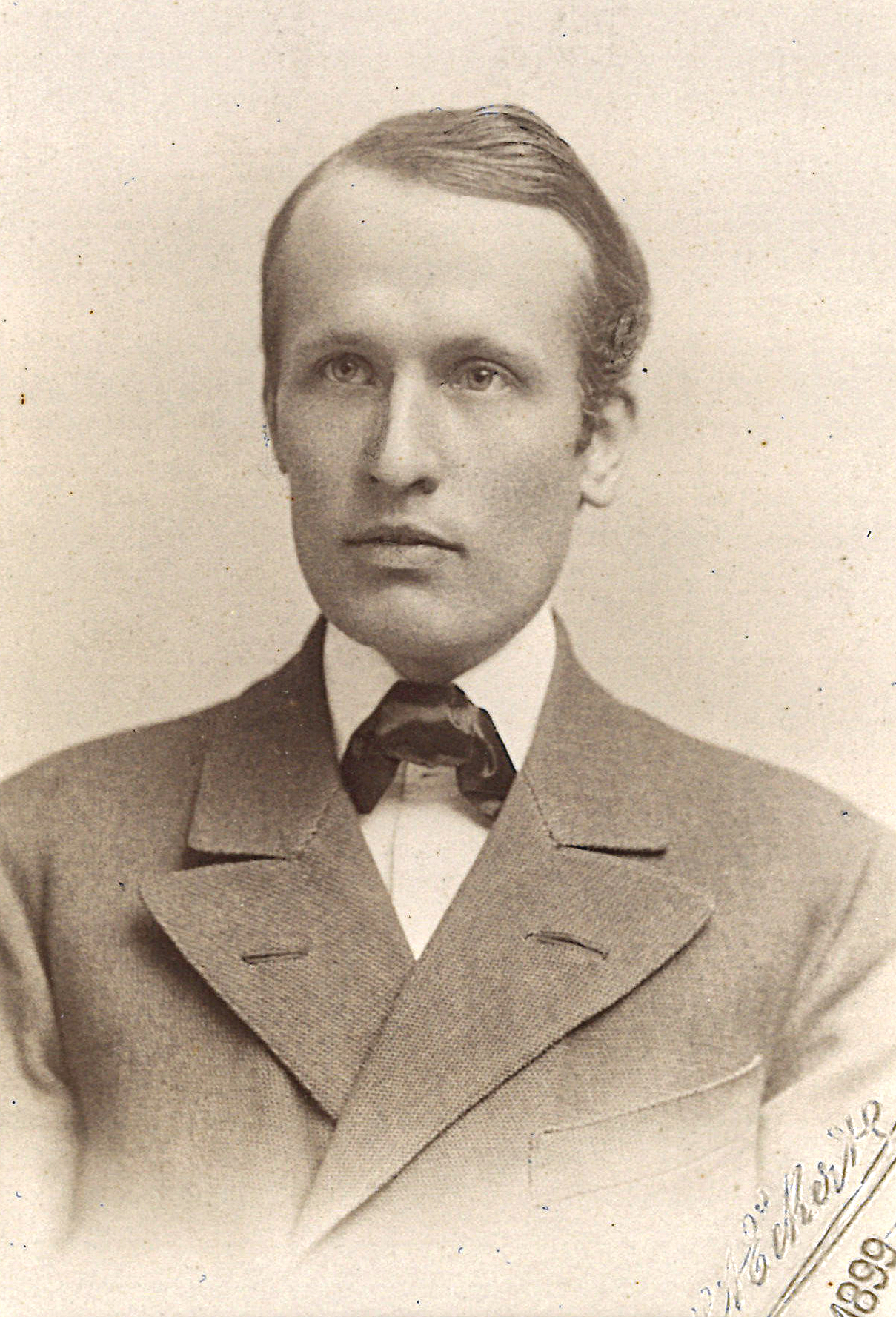
His son Egon von Oppolzer founded the Historic Observatory in Innsbruck.

Theodor von Oppolzer (26 October 1841 – 26 December 1886) was an Austrian astronomer and mathematician of Bohemian origin.

The son of the physician Johann Ritter von Oppolzer, Theodor was born in Prague. He completed his graduate studies in medicine at the University of Vienna, gaining a Ph.D. in 1865. He also owned a private observatory. He began teaching theoretical astronomy and geodesics at the University of Vienna in 1866. By 1875 he was appointed a professor. In 1873 he became the director of the Austrian Geodetic Survey, and in 1886 he was elected vice president of the International Geodetic Association.

He was considered a highly capable astronomer and mathematician. For example, he was reputed to have memorized the values of 14,000 logarithms. In 1868 he led an expedition to observe a solar eclipse. Afterward (1885) he authored the Canon der Finsternisse, an authoritative compilation of the 8,000 solar and 5,200 lunar eclipses from 1200 B.C. until 2161. This was widely recognized as one of the greatest computational feats of its day.

Oppolzer authored over 300 papers, with most concerning the orbital elements of comets and asteroids. He also published a two-volume manual on the determination of the orbital elements of comets and planets. Both of his works served as standard astronomy references for many years.

He was working on an improved theory of lunar motion at the time of his death. His son Egon von Oppolzer also became a distinguished astronomer. He started to build the Historic Observatory of the University of Innsbruck.

== Awards and honors ==
- Elected to the Imperial Academy of Sciences of Vienna, 1882.
- Elected to the American National Academy of Sciences, 1883.
- The crater Oppolzer on the Moon is named after him.
- Asteroid 1492 Oppolzer was named for him. In addition asteroids were named for his wife (237 Coelestina), and his two daughters (153 Hilda and 228 Agathe). 153 Hilda then gave its name to the Hilda group.
