= Oskeria =

Oskeria (Georgian: ოსკერია; also recorded in older sources as Oskoria (Georgian: ოსკორია) was a village in Aspindza Rayon, in Samtskhe–Javakheti of Georgia. It was depopulated following the forced deportation of Muslims from present-day Samtskhe–Javakheti in 1944 and was abolished in 1949.

== History ==
Oskeria was an old Georgian settlement. The area in which it was located came under Ottoman rule in 1578. In the 1595 Ottoman detailed cadastral survey, the village was recorded as "Oskeriya / Oskoriya" (اوصكریه). At that time, it belonged to the Khertvisi nahiye of the Khertvisi liva and consisted of 10 Christian households. The heads of households liable to pay taxes bore Georgian names such as Avgaroz (ავგაროზ), Badura (ბადურა), Batata (ბატატა), Elia (ელია), and Gogina (გოგინა). Wheat, barley, rye, and millet were cultivated in the village, while beekeeping and the raising of sheep and pigs were also practiced.

Oskeria or Oskoria came under the rule of the Russian Empire following the Russo-Turkish War of 1828–1829. At the end of the war, the village was located in an area subject to a population exchange based on religious affiliation, as stipulated by the Treaty of Adrianople between the Ottoman Empire and Russia. Nevertheless, the village appears to have remained inhabited. According to a demographic and ethnic survey conducted by the administration of the Tiflis Governorate in 1870, the village of "Oskoriya" (Оскория), located in the Akhaltsikhe uezd of the Tbilisi Governorate, had 10 households and a population of 107, comprising 55 men and 52 women. The entire population was recorded as Sunni Terekeme.

Oskeria was also recorded as "Oskoria" (Оскоріа) in the 1886 Russian census. At that time, the village, located in the Uraveli uchastok of the Akhaltsikhe uezd, had nine households and a population of 64, comprising 31 men and 33 women. The population was classified as "Tatars" (Татары) in this census.

In the 1930s, Oskeria was one of the villages of the Toloshi village soviet in Aspindza district (raioni), together with Toloshi (ტოლოში), Alandzia (ალანძია), Atskvita (აწყვიტა), Bnela (ბნელა), Gelsunda (გელსუნდა), Kuntsa (ქუნცა), Roketi (როკეთ), and Narimani (ნარიმანი). Following the deportation in 1944 of the population identified as Turks and Kurds by the State Defense Committee of the Soviet Union to the Kazakh, Uzbek, and Kyrgyz Soviet Socialist Republics, Oskeria was completely depopulated. On 2 August 1949, the village of Oskeria was abolished on the grounds that its inhabitants had moved elsewhere.

Oskeria was located on the banks of the Kura River. A new village named Iveria (ივერია) was later established in the area where Oskeria had been located.
