= Gugunauri =

Gugunauri (Georgian: გუგუნაური) was a village in present-day Adigeni Municipality, Samtskhe–Javakheti, Georgia. The village was depopulated following the 1944 deportation of Muslims from the Meskheti region and was officially abolished as a village in 1949.

== History ==
Gugunauri was a Georgian settlement in a region that came under Ottoman rule in 1578. However, the village does not appear in the 1595 Ottoman detailed tax register. It is unclear whether the settlement existed at the time but was omitted from the register or whether it was established later. The Georgian place name Gugunauri (გუგუნაური) is derived from the personal name Guguna with the suffix -uri.

Following the Russo-Turkish War (1828–1829), Gugunauri came under the rule of the Russian Empire. In the 1886 Russian census, the village was recorded under the names “Гугунауръ” (Gugunaur) or “Гогонауръ” (Gogonaur). At the time, it belonged to Akhaltsikhe Uyezd. Its eight households had a population of 109, comprising 53 men and 56 women, all recorded as Georgians.

In the 1930s, Gugunauri was a village within the Zedubani Village Soviet, together with Gortubani (გორთუბანი), Kortokhi (კორტოხი) and Apieti (აფიეთი). In 1944, its inhabitants were deported to Central Asia as part of the mass deportation of Muslims from Meskheti. On 2 August 1949, the Presidium of the Supreme Soviet of the Georgian SSR abolished the village status of Gugunauri and Kortokhi, both belonging to the Zedubani Village Soviet, on the grounds that their inhabitants had moved elsewhere. The remains of a section of a wall belonging to a house estimated to be about 200 years old are reported to be the only surviving traces of the village.
