= Georgian National Astrophysical Observatory =

Observatory in Abastumani, Adigeni Municipality, Georgia

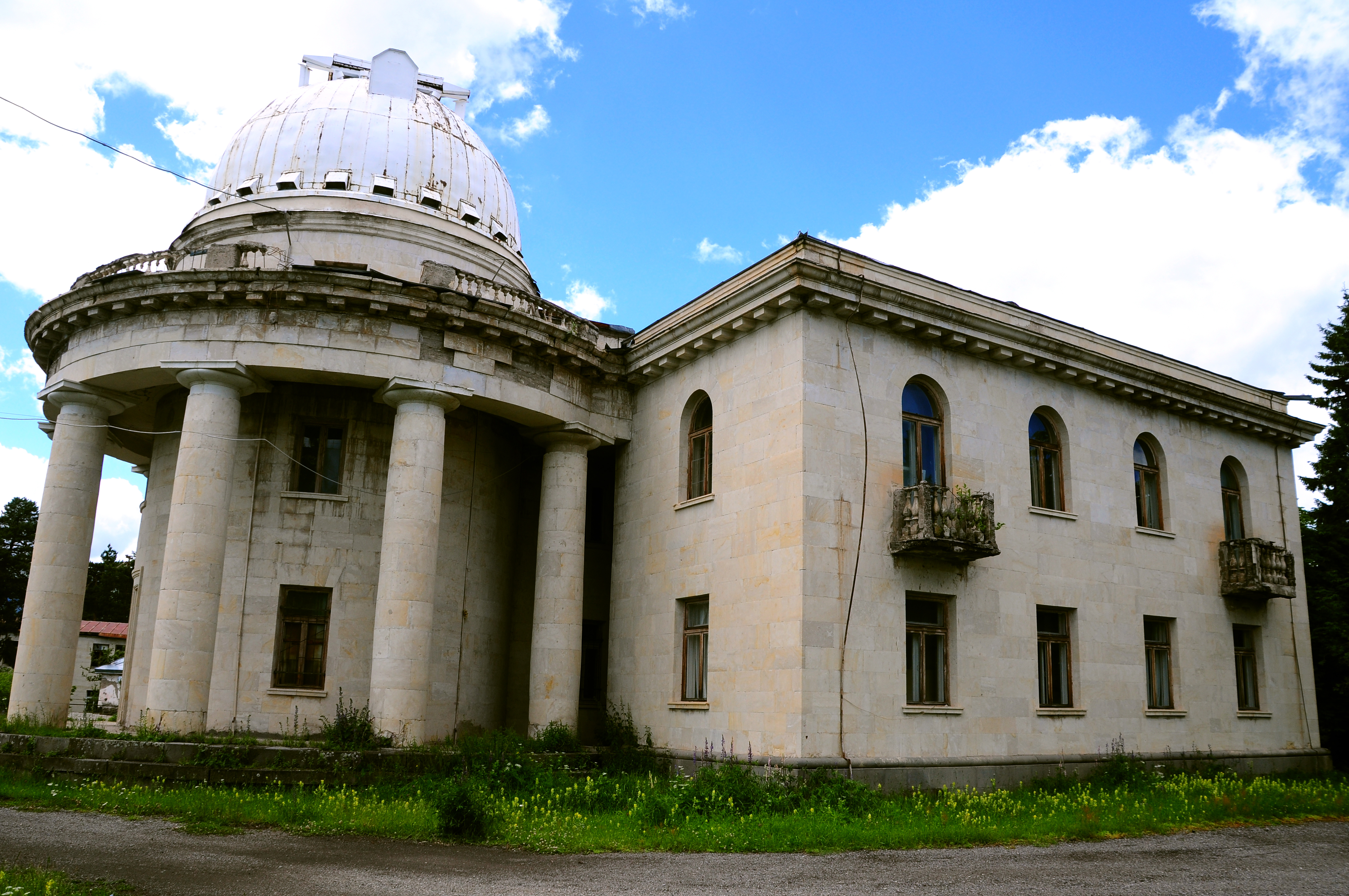
- Alternative names: Abastumani Astrophysical Observatory
- Observatory code: 119
- Location: Abastumani, Adigeni Municipality, Samtskhe–Javakheti, Georgia
- Coordinates: 41°45′15″N 42°49′10″E
- Altitude: 1,650 m (5,410 ft)
- Website: www.abao.ge

Telescopes
- Unnamed: 33 cm Reflector - mounted in 1932, now is in the Museum of GENAO
- Unnamed: 40 cm Zeiss Refractor - mounted in 1936
- Unnamed: 44 cm Zeiss Schmidt Camera - mounted in 1940
- Unnamed: 70 cm Maksutov Meniscus Telescope - 1955
- Unnamed: 48 cm Cassegrain Reflector - mounted in 1968
- Unnamed: 40 cm Zeiss Double Astrograph - mounted in 1978
- Unnamed: 125 cm Ritchey–Chrétien Reflector - mounted in 1977
- Location of Georgian National Astrophysical Observatory
- Related media on Commons

Georgian National Astrophysical Observatory (GENAO) was founded in 1932 by Academician Evgeni Kharadze on Mount Kanobili, near the Abastumani resort in the Samtskhe-Javakheti region of southeastern Georgia. The altitude of Mt. Kanobili varies between 1650 and 1700 m above sea level. The observatory is located ~250 km from Tbilisi, the capital of Georgia. Its distance from air pollution and artificial sky illumination, together with excellent natural conditions (a hilly landscape covered with coniferous forest) make this location one of the best for observatories at the same altitude range. The weather is stable, without harsh and sudden changes.

The observatory carries out wide-profile research spanning different fields of astronomy and astrophysics and investigations of the upper layers of Earth's atmosphere.

== Telescopes ==
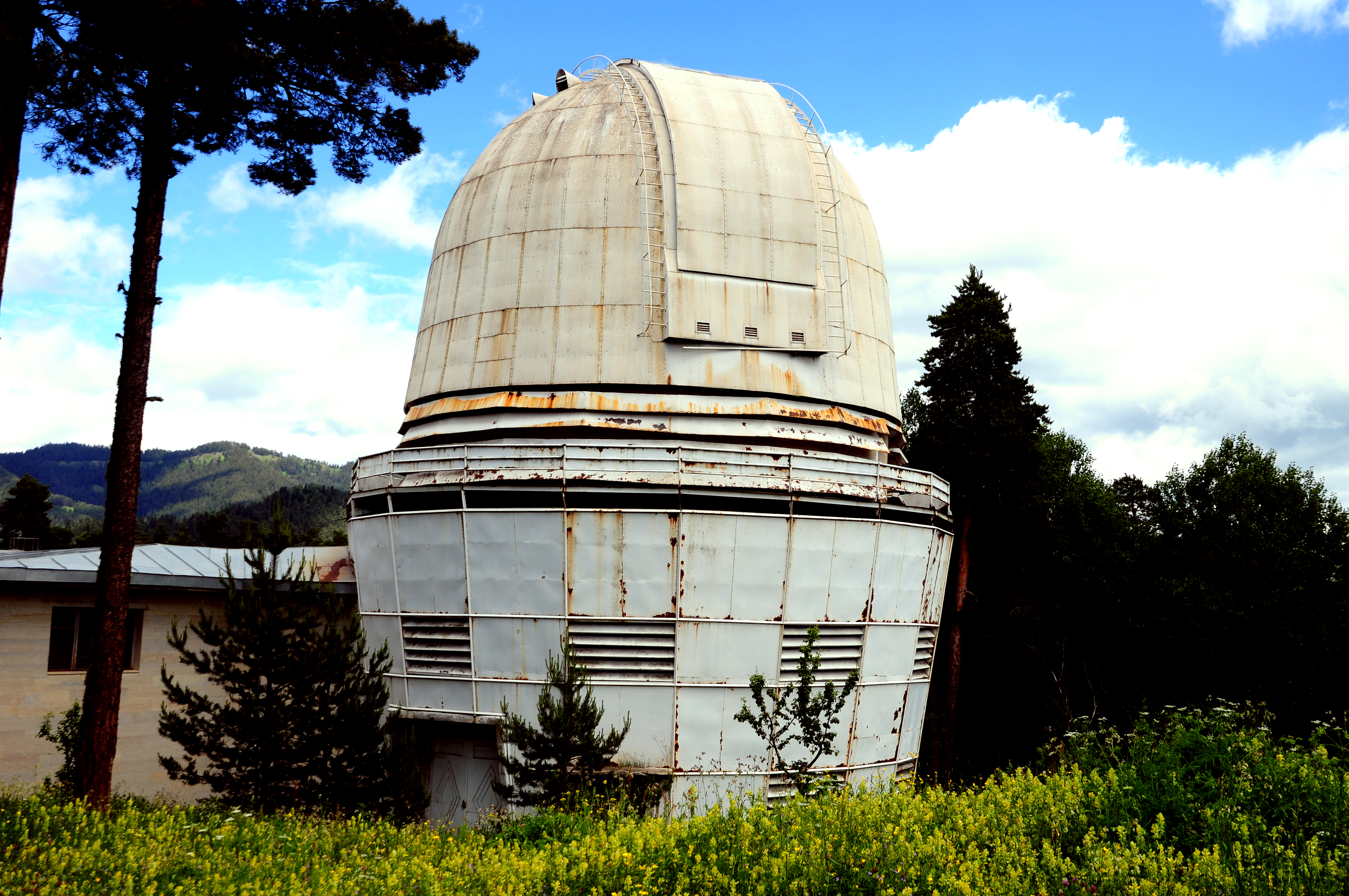
Georgian National Astrophysical Observatory

1. 33 cm Reflector - mounted in 1932, now in the Museum of GENAO
2. 40 cm Zeiss Refractor - mounted in 1936
3. 44 cm Zeiss Schmidt Camera - mounted in 1940
4. 70 cm Maksutov Meniscus Telescope - 1955
5. 48 cm Cassegrain Reflector - mounted in 1968
6. 40 cm Zeiss Double Astrograph - mounted in 1978
7. 125 cm Ritchey–Chrétien Reflector - mounted in 1977

== See also ==
- List of astronomical observatories
- Lists of telescopes
