= Kortokhi =

Former village in Samtskhe–Javakheti, Georgia

Kortokhi (Georgian: კორტოხი) was a village in present-day Adigeni Municipality, in the Samtskhe–Javakheti region of Georgia. The village was depopulated following the 1944 deportation of Muslims from the Meskheti region. In 1949, its status as a village was abolished by a resolution of the Presidium of the Supreme Soviet of the Georgian SSR.

== History ==
Kortokhi (კორტოხი) is a Georgian place name meaning "hill". Kortokhi was an old settlement, and the area where it was located came under Ottoman rule in 1578. In the 1595 Ottoman detailed tax register, the village is recorded as "Kordokhet" (كوردوخت). At that time, the settlement belonged to the Ude nahiya of the Akhaltsikhe liva and consisted of 16 Christian households. The heads of taxable households bore Georgian names such as Aghdgomel, Makharebel, Ioseb, Giorgi, Ivane, and Gogicha. The inhabitants cultivated wheat, barley, rye, millet, chickpeas, lentils, and flaxseed, kept bees, and raised sheep and pigs.

Kortokhi came under the control of the Russian Empire following the Russo-Turkish War (1828–1829). However, the village is not listed in the 1886 Russian census of the Akhaltsikhe uyezd, although the neighboring villages of Zedubani, Gortubani, and Apieti are recorded there.

In the 1930s, Kortokhi was a village within the Zedubani village soviet, together with Gortubani (გორთუბანი), Gugunauri (გუგუნაური), and Apieti (აფიეთი). In 1944, its inhabitants were deported to Central Asia. On 2 August 1949, the Presidium of the Supreme Soviet of the Georgian SSR adopted a resolution abolishing the village status of Kortokhi and Gugunauri, both of which belonged to the Zedubani village soviet, on the grounds that their inhabitants had moved elsewhere.
