= Ghaghvi =

Ghaghvi (Georgian: ღაღვი) was a village in present-day Adigeni Municipality, in the Samtskhe-Javakheti region of Georgia. The village was depopulated following the 1944 deportation of Muslims from the Meskheti region, and its status as a village was revoked by a decree in 1949. The name Ghaghvi survives in the names of a church, a stream, and a mineral spring.

== History ==
Ghaghvi was a Georgian settlement in a region that came under Ottoman rule in 1578. In the 1595 Ottoman detailed cadastral register, the village was recorded as "Ghaghv" (غاغو) and belonged to the Kvabliani nahiye in the Liwa of Akhaltsikhe. The village had been completely deserted by the time the region came under Ottoman rule. Ghaghvi was situated on the left bank of the Kvabliani River, east of the village of Dertseli.

Ghaghvi came under Russian rule following the Russo-Turkish War (1828–1829). In the 1886 Russian census, the village was recorded as Гагва (Gagva). At the time, it was part of Akhaltsikhe Uyezd. Its 13 households had a total population of 106, comprising 66 men and 40 women; the entire population was recorded as Georgian.

While Ghaghvi was part of the Mokhe Village Soviet, its inhabitants were deported to Central Asia in 1944. On 2 August 1949, the Presidium of the Supreme Soviet of the Georgian SSR adopted a decree revoking the village status of Ghaghvi and Kuchauri (კუჭაური), on the grounds that their inhabitants had moved elsewhere.
