= Schubart family =

The Schubart family (002) is a collisional asteroid family of at least 353 known asteroids, named for its largest member, the 67-kilometre (42 mi)-across asteroid 1911 Schubart. It lies within the larger dynamical group of Hilda asteroids, a group of asteroids in the 3:2 orbital resonance with Jupiter. Like its namesake, it's named after the largest member, 1911 Schubart. All members of the family are dark P-type asteroids with albedos of around 0.04. Another asteroid family in the Hilda dynamical group is the Hilda family, named for its largest member, 153 Hilda.

An asteroid family is a group of physically related asteroids usually created by a collision with an original larger asteroid, with the fragments continuing on similar orbits to the original. This is distinct from a dynamical group in that the members of a dynamical group only share similar orbits because of gravitational interactions with planets, which concentrate asteroids in a particular orbital range. Members of the Schubart family are both part of the wider Hilda dynamical group, and fragments of a single original asteroid. The family is considered a catastrophic asteroid family because even its largest member, 1911 Schubart, does not make up a majority of the family's mass.

The family is fairly old, with an estimated age of 1.7±0.7 billion years. Although this is old by the standards of typical asteroid families, the Hilda collisional family in the same orbital region is much older, possibly 4 billion years in age.

== Large members ==

- 1911 Schubart: 3.2 (46.3%)
- 3923 Radzievskij: 0.293 (4.2%)
- 4230 van den Bergh: 0.256 (3.7%)
- (8376) 1992 OZ9: 0.245 (3.5%)
- (13035) 1989 UA6: 0.226 (3.3%)
- 9829 Murillo: 0.149 (2.2%)
- 8550 Hesiodos: 0.116 (1.7%)
- (15615) 2000 HU1: 0.104 (1.5%)
- (8913) 1995 YB2: 0.0698 (1.0%)
- (12307) 1991 UA: 0.0552 (0.8%)
- all other members: 2.19 (31.7%)
Mass distribution of the Schubart family (assuming similar densities)

The 10 brightest Schubart family members
Name	Abs. Mag	Size (km)	proper a (AU)	proper e	proper i
1911 Schubart	10.04	67	3.9659	0.191	2.916
3923 Radzievskij	11.77	30	3.9661	0.196	2.874
4230 van den Bergh	11.87	28	3.9661	0.197	2.853
(8376) 1992 OZ9	11.90	28	3.9659	0.190	2.793
(13035) 1989 UA6	11.96	27	3.9661	0.195	2.879
9829 Murillo	12.26	26	3.9659	0.192	2.855
8550 Hesiodos	12.44	25	3.9658	0.190	2.834
(15615) 2000 HU1	12.52	22	3.9662	0.198	2.982
(8913) 1995 YB2	12.81	20	3.9662	0.197	2.898
(12307) 1991 UA	12.98	20	3.9660	0.193	2.889
