= 1529 Oterma =

Hildian asteroid

Discovery
- Discovered by: Y. Väisälä
- Discovery site: Turku Obs.
- Discovery date: 26 January 1938

Designations
- Named after: Liisi Oterma (astronomer)
- Alternative designations: 1938 BC · 1950 PV; 1959 RD_{1} · A912 VO
- Minor planet category: main-belt · Hilda

Orbital characteristics
- Epoch 4 September 2017 (JD 2458000.5)
- Uncertainty parameter 0
- Observation arc: 66.76 yr (24,385 days)
- Aphelion: 4.7933 AU
- Perihelion: 3.1916 AU
- Semi-major axis: 3.9924 AU
- Eccentricity: 0.2006
- Orbital period (sidereal): 7.98 yr (2,914 days)
- Mean anomaly: 50.497°
- Mean motion: 0° 7^{m} 24.96^{s} / day
- Inclination: 9.0582°
- Longitude of ascending node: 100.59°
- Argument of perihelion: 295.08°
- Jupiter MOID: 0.8116 AU

Physical characteristics
- Dimensions: 54.40 km (calculated); 56.327±0.285; 60.16±1.11 km
- Synodic rotation period: 15.75 h
- Geometric albedo: 0.047±0.002; 0.054±0.003; 0.057 (assumed)
- Spectral type: Tholen = P · P B–V = 0.764; U–B = 0.386
- Absolute magnitude (H): 10.05 · 10.11±0.26

1529 Oterma (provisional designation 1938 BC) is a reddish, rare-type Hildian asteroid from the outermost region of the asteroid belt, approximately 56 kilometers in diameter. It was discovered on 26 January 1938, by Finnish astronomer Yrjö Väisälä at Turku Observatory in Southwest Finland. It is named for Liisi Oterma.

== Orbit and classification ==
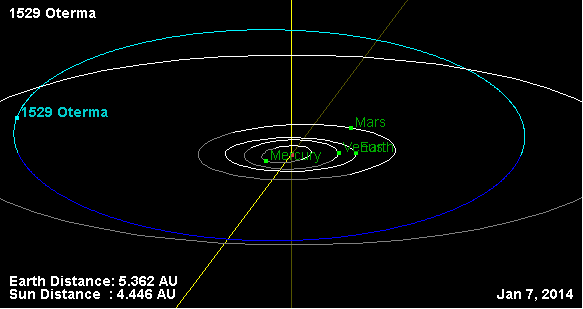
Orbit of 1529 Oterma

Oterma is a member of the Hilda family (001), an asteroid family within the dynamical Hilda group, a large group of asteroids that orbit in resonance with the gas giant Jupiter. Hildian asteroids are thought to have originated from the Kuiper belt in the outer Solar System.

It orbits the Sun in the outer main-belt at a distance of 3.2–4.8 AU once every 7 years and 12 months (2,914 days). Its orbit has an eccentricity of 0.20 and an inclination of 9° with respect to the ecliptic.

It was first identified as A912 VO at Winchester Observatory in 1912 (799). The body's observation arc begins at Turku a few weeks after its official discovery observation.

== Physical characteristics ==
Oterma belongs to an exclusive group of 33 known asteroids with a spectral P-type in the Tholen classification scheme.

=== Photometry ===
During a study of 47 Hilda asteroids in the 1990s, a rotational lightcurve of Oterma was obtained from photometric observations at the Swedish Uppsala Astronomical Observatory and other places. It gave a rotation period of 15.75 hours with a change in brightness of 0.18 magnitude (U=2).

=== Diameter and albedo ===
According to the space-based surveys carried out by NASA's Wide-field Infrared Survey Explorer with its subsequent NEOWISE mission and by the Japanese Akari satellite, Oterma measures 56.33 and 60.1 kilometers in diameter and its surface has an albedo of 0.054 and 0.047, respectively. The Collaborative Asteroid Lightcurve Link assumes a standard albedo for carbonaceous asteroids of 0.057 and calculates a diameter of 54.40 kilometers, with an absolute magnitude of 10.05.

== Naming ==
Oterma was named for Liisi Oterma (1915–2001), first Finnish female astronomer with a PhD and a discoverer of minor planets and comets at the Turku observatory between 1939 and 1953. The official naming citation was published by the Minor Planet Center on 20 February 1976 (M.P.C. 3929).
