= Abastumani =

Abastumani აბასთუმანი
- Borough
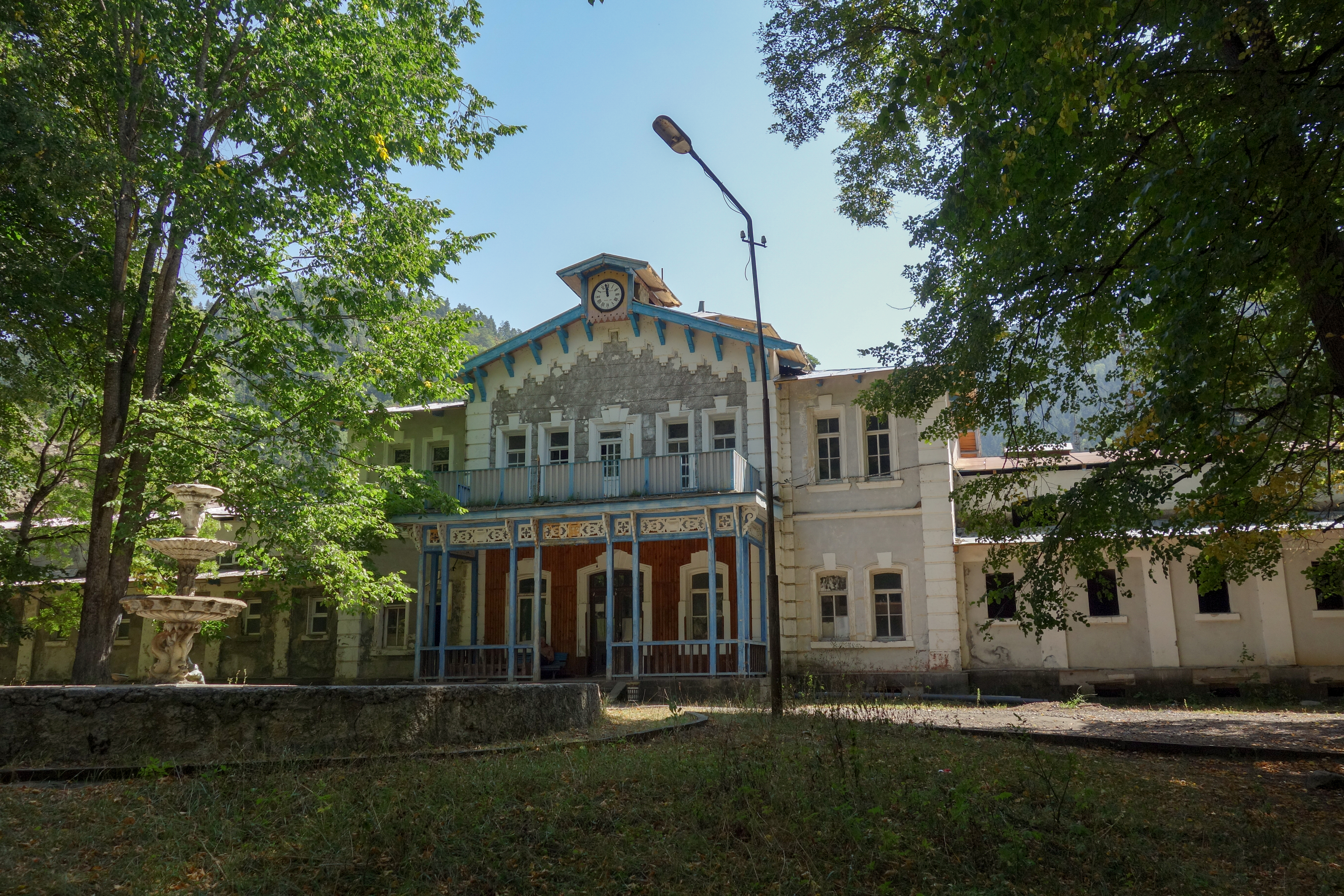
- Romanovs Bath

- Location in Georgia Abastumani (Samtskhe-Javakheti)
- Coordinates: 41°45′9″N 42°49′55″E
- Country: Georgia
- Region: Samtskhe-Javakheti
- Municipality: Adigeni
- Elevation: 1,340 m (4,400 ft)

Population (2014)
  - Total: 937
- Time zone: UTC+4 (Georgian Time)

Abastumani (Georgian: აბასთუმანი) is a small town (daba) and climatic spa in Adigeni Municipality, Samtskhe-Javakheti, Georgia. It is located on the southern slopes of the Meskheti Range (Lesser Caucasus), in the small river valley of Otskhe, 25 km northeast of Adigeni and 28 km west of Akhaltsikhe. As of the 2014 census, it had a population of 937. The Georgian National Astrophysical Observatory is located at Abastumani. In February 2026, the Georgian government established a 52-kilometre-diameter no-fly zone over Abastumani extending from ground to unlimited altitude, effective 16 April 2026; officially intended to protect the Abastumani Astrophysical Observatory, an RFE/RL investigation linked the closure to the private interests of Bidzina Ivanishvili, founder of the ruling Georgian Dream party, who has maintained a residence and extensive land holdings in the town since 2018.

== Demography ==
According to the 2014 census, 937 people live in the township.

Census year	Population	Man	Woman
1989	2447	--	--
2002	▼1368	--	--
2014	▼937	439	498

== History ==
In medieval Georgia, the area of modern-day Abastumani was part of the district of Odzrkhe so named after a fortress whose ruins survive near the townlet. In the 16th century, it fell to the Ottoman Empire under whose rule the area was deserted, but its hot springs were appreciated and frequented by locals. Under the Russian rule, a short-lived German colony of Friedenthal (Russian: Фрейденталь) emerged there in 1842. In the 1850s, it was recolonized by the Russians under the patronage of Viceroy of the Caucasus Mikhail Vorontsov. The new settlement acquired the name Abbas-Tuman after a nearby located village and became popular for its climate and thermal waters. Its development as a resort is chiefly associated with Grand Duke George Alexandrovich (1871–1899), a member of the Russian imperial family, who had retired there due to his ill-health. Abastumani acquired the status of an urban-type settlement (Georgian: daba) under the Soviet Union in 1926. Tourism infrastructure has been renovated since the mid-2000s.

=== Airspace closure ===
Bidzina Ivanishvili, billionaire founder and honorary chairman of Georgian Dream, began acquiring property in Abastumani in 2018 and subsequently announced plans to redevelop the resort, including a proposed transition to electric-vehicle-only transport. According to Transparency International – Georgia, nine entities linked to Ivanishvili purchased 52,443 m² of land in the town for 6.4 million GEL between 2018 and 2022, during which period the state also spent approximately 250 million GEL on resort-area projects, including a controversial bypass road that required the clearing of protected coniferous forest. Ivanishvili and associated companies reportedly own the only helicopter landing pad in the area.

In parallel, airspace above Abastumani has been progressively restricted. An 8-kilometre "temporary" closure introduced in October 2019 was later made permanent as zone "Abastumani-1" (UGR-24), and in February 2026 the government enacted Resolution №52, establishing the 52-kilometre-diameter "Abastumani-2" (UGR-58) zone effective 16 April 2026. The ground-to-unlimited (GND-UNL) restriction, formally justified by the needs of the Abastumani Astrophysical Observatory, affects several major international air corridors connecting Europe with Central Asia and is stricter than restrictions applied over Georgia's own military and strategic sites. A 2026 Radio Free Europe/Radio Liberty investigation, citing sources in state aviation bodies and the industry, reported that the expansion was linked to Ivanishvili's interests rather than to observational requirements, noting that the observatory's director was unable to cite any comparable international precedent for the measure.

== Spa ==
Abastumani possesses a moderately dry mountainous climate, with relative humidity reaching 50% only in summer. The annual average number of hours of sunlight is 3,000. Average annual precipitation is 626 mm. Average annual temperature is 6.4 to 6.5 °C (44 to 44 °F) in January and 17.2 °C (63 °F) in July. Abastumani's three hyperthermic springs (39–48.5 °C) are little mineralized, rich in sulfate-sodium chloride waters. They have long been used in the treatment of tuberculosis. Abastumani is also a starting point for hikes into the Borjomi-Kharagauli National Park.

== Landmarks ==
Beyond being a spa town with functioning hotels and sanatoria, Abastumani houses several cultural landmarks documenting the townlet's medieval and modern history. These are:

- The 14th-century church of St. George, which was repaired and its hitherto unknown medieval frescos discovered in 2008.
- The 13th-century ruined castle and a single arch bridge named after the medieval Queen Thamar.
- The "New Zarzma" (Akhali Zarzma) church of St. Alexander Nevsky, a 19th-century small replica of the 14th-century Georgian cathedral of Zarzma. It was commissioned by Grand Duke George from the Tbilisi-based architect Otto Jacob Simons who built it between 1899 and 1902, marrying a medieval Georgian design with the contemporaneous architectural forms. Its interior was frescoed by the Russian painter Mikhail Nesterov.
- A bathhouse constructed on the Abastumani hot springs between 1879 and 1881 by the St. Petersburg-born physician of German descent Adolf Remmert (Адольф Александрович Реммерт; 1835–1902). Remmert died in Germany and, according to his will, was buried at a Catholic church in Abastumani, which has not survived.
- Winter and summer mansions of Grand Duke George designed by Otto Jacob Simons and built of stone and wood, respectively. Located on the opposite banks of the Otskhe, they were connected through a small bridge. The summer mansion was frequented by the party officials in the Soviet era. In the 1990s, it was turned over to the Georgian Orthodox Church and converted into a St. Panteleimon nunnery. The building was destroyed in a fire on March 12, 2008, and is currently being rebuilt.

== Interesting facts ==
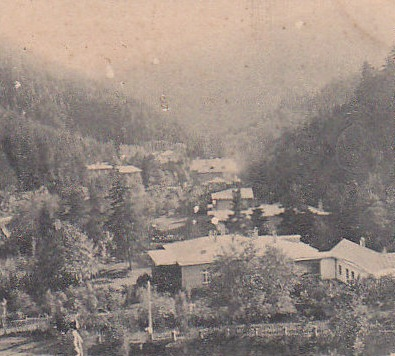
Abastumani. Palace of Giorgi Alexander approx. 1891.

- On March 12, 2008, a fire broke out in the monastery of St. Panteleimon the Healer located in Abastuman resort. The monastery was located in a 19th-century wooden palace built by Prince George, the brother of Russian Emperor Nicholas II. Giorgi himself lived in this palace for several years and died here on June 28, 1899. The fire suddenly spread to the roof of the building and the surrounding area of the monastery. The fire was so big and spread so fast that it posed a danger to the settlement. Adigeni and Akhaltsikhe fire services managed to localize the fire; Together with them, the local population tried to help the firefighters with their own strength. As a result of the fire, most of the monastery was completely burnt. The cause of the fire, as it is assumed, was the damaged throat of the old fireplace.
- In June 2009, during restoration work in the Church of St. George in Abastuman, a unique medieval fresco of the 14th century was found. During the restoration of the western part of the temple, specialists discovered a wall painting depicting scenes of the baptism of the Savior, Mary mother of Jesus, the Desert Fathers and the Last and Terrible Judgment. Restoration work to restore the temple began in 2008.

== See also ==
- Georgian National Astrophysical Observatory
- Samtskhe-Javakheti
