= Evgeni Kharadze =

Georgian astronomer

- Born: 31 October 1907; Tbilisi, Georgia
- Died: 10 October 2001 (aged 93); Tbilisi, Georgia
- Education: Tbilisi State University
- Scientific career
- Fields: astronomy
- Workplaces: Tbilisi State University; Georgian Academy of Sciences

Evgeni Kharadze (Georgian: ევგენი ხარაძე; October 31, 1907 – October 10, 2001) was a Georgian astronomer, public figure and statesman.

== Early life and education ==
Kharadze was born in Tbilisi, October 31, 1907 into the family of an employee of the Transcaucasus Railway. In 1930 he graduated from Tbilisi State University.

== Career ==
In 1949 he became a professor at the Tbilisi State University. Kharadze's monograph “Catalogue of the Color Indices of 14000 Stars and Investigation of Light Absorption in the Galaxy on the Basis of Color Indices of Stars” was published in 1952. He was the author of a fundamental handbook “The Course of General Astrophysics” and two volumes of “Principles of Astronomy” in Georgian. He served as seventeenth rector of the Tbilisi State University (1959–1966), vice-president (1972–1980) and president (1980–1986) of the Georgian SSR Academy of Sciences, vice-president of International Astronomical Union (1976–1982), director of Abastumani Astrophysical Observatory (1932–1992). He was a member of the Communist Party of the Soviet Union from 1942.

== Honors ==
Kharadze became a full member of the Georgian Academy of Sciences in 1955, and a member of the Academy of Sciences of the Soviet Union in 1984.

The asteroid 2147 Kharadze, discovered by Richard Martin West, was named after Evgeni Kharadze.
