= Canon of Eclipses =

Book by Theodor von Oppolzer

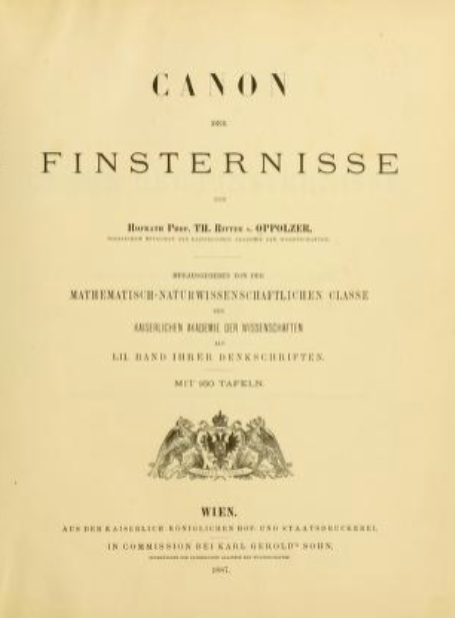
- Title page for Canon der Finsternisse (1887)
- Author: Theodor Ritter von Oppolzer
- Publication date: 1887

The Canon of Eclipses (German: Canon der Finsternisse), published in 1887 at the Imperial Academy of Sciences of Vienna by Theodor Ritter von Oppolzer, is a compilation of over 13000 (8000 solar and 5200 lunar) eclipses, including all solar and all umbral lunar eclipses between the years 1208 BC and 2161 CE. It was republished by Dover Books in 1962.
