= 1390 Abastumani =

Large main-belt asteroid

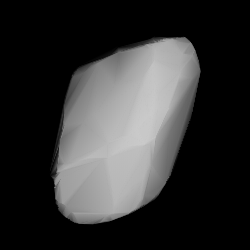
- Shape model of Abastumani from its lightcurve

Discovery
- Discovered by: P. Shajn
- Discovery site: Simeiz Obs.
- Discovery date: 3 October 1935

Designations
- Named after: Abastumani (Georgian town)
- Alternative designations: 1935 TA · 1926 GN; 1929 UL · A907 GN; A916 VA
- Minor planet category: main-belt · (outer); background

Orbital characteristics
- Epoch 16 February 2017 (JD 2457800.5)
- Uncertainty parameter 0
- Observation arc: 86.80 yr (31,705 days)
- Aphelion: 3.5547 AU
- Perihelion: 3.3166 AU
- Semi-major axis: 3.4356 AU
- Eccentricity: 0.0347
- Orbital period (sidereal): 6.37 yr (2,326 days)
- Mean anomaly: 290.65°
- Mean motion: 0° 9^{m} 17.28^{s} / day
- Inclination: 19.932°
- Longitude of ascending node: 28.919°
- Argument of perihelion: 332.76°

Physical characteristics
- Mean diameter: 95.849±2.283 km 98.30±2.03 km 101.58±2.3 km (IRAS:12); 107.827±6.977 km
- Synodic rotation period: 17.100±0.005 h
- Geometric albedo: 0.0264±0.0121; 0.0298±0.001 (IRAS:12); 0.033±0.002
- Spectral type: Tholen = P; B–V = 0.685; U–B = 0.189
- Absolute magnitude (H): 9.40

1390 Abastumani (prov. designation: 1935 TA) is a very large and dark background asteroid from the outer region of the asteroid belt. It was discovered on 3 October 1935, by Russian astronomer Pelageya Shajn at the Simeiz Observatory on the Crimean peninsula. The primitive P-type asteroid has a rotation period of 17.1 hours and measures approximately 101 kilometers (63 miles) in diameter. It was named for the Georgian town of Abastumani.

== Orbit and classification ==
The dark and reddish asteroid is classified as a rare P-type asteroid in the Tholen taxonomic scheme, of which only a few dozens bodies are currently known. It orbits the Sun at a distance of 3.3–3.6 AU once every 6 years and 4 months (2,326 days). Its orbit has an eccentricity of 0.03 and an inclination of 20° with respect to the ecliptic. The first used precovery was taken at Lowell Observatory in 1929, extending the asteroid's observation arc by 6 years prior to its discovery.

== Discovery ==
Abastumani was discovered on 3 October 1935, by Soviet–Russian astronomer Pelageya Shajn at Simeiz Observatory on the Crimean peninsula. On the same night, the asteroid was independently discovered by South African astronomer Cyril Jackson at Johannesburg Observatory. It was one of the last large-sized bodies discovered in the outer belt (also see 1269 Rollandia and 1902 Shaposhnikov, discovered in 1930 and 1972, respectively).

== Naming ==
This minor planet is named after the spa town of Abastumani located in the Caucasus Mountains of Georgia. It is now the place where the Abastuman Astronomical Observatory (119) is situated. The official naming citation was published by the Minor Planet Center in November 1952 (M.P.C. 838).

== Physical characteristics ==
In the Tholen classification, Abastumani is a primitive, carbonaceous P-type asteroid, a common spectral type in the outer main-belt and among the Jupiter trojan population.

=== Rotation period ===
In April 2002, a rotational lightcurve of Abastumani was obtained from photometric observation by astronomer John Gross at the U.S. Sonoran Skies Observatory (G94) in Benson, Arizona. It gave a rotation period of 17.100±0.005 hours with a brightness variation of 0.15 in magnitude (U=2).

=== Diameter and albedo ===
According to the surveys carried out by the Infrared Astronomical Satellite IRAS, the Japanese Akari satellite, and the NEOWISE mission of NASA's Wide-field Infrared Survey Explorer, the asteroid measures between 98.3 and 107.8 kilometers in diameter, and its surface has a very low albedo between 0.026 and 0.033. The Collaborative Asteroid Lightcurve Link adopts the results obtained by IRAS, i.e. a diameter of 101.5 kilometers and an albedo of 0.0298.
