= Kvabliani (river) =

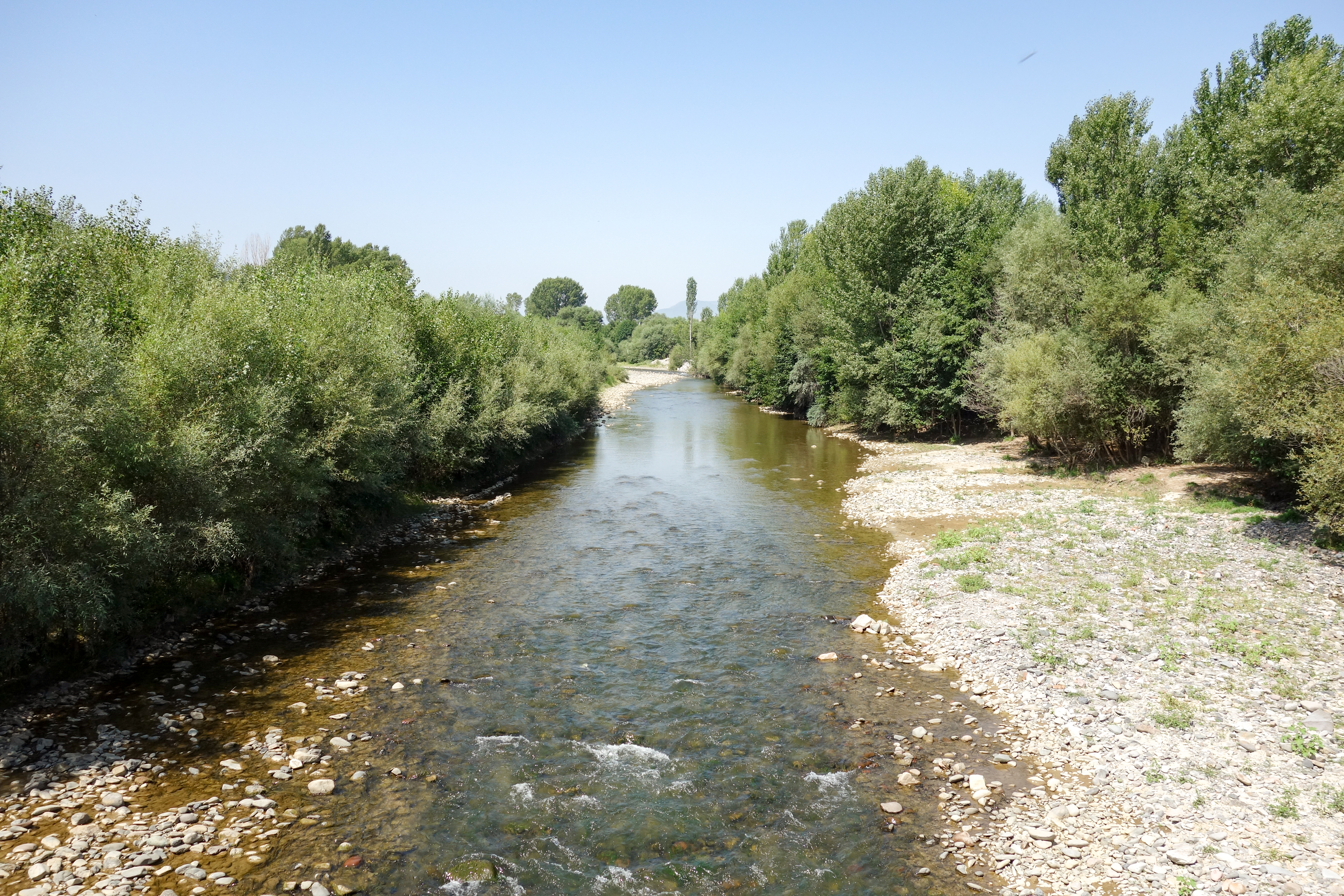
- Kvabliani in Arali.

- Location within Samtskhe-Javakheti Location within Georgia
- Native name: ქვაბლიანი (Georgian)

Location
- Country: Georgia
- Autonomous Republic: Adjara
- Region: Samtskhe-Javakheti

Physical characteristics
- Source: Meskheti Range
  - elevation: 2355 m
- Mouth
  - coordinates: 41.64508°N 42.85544°E
- Length: 41 km (25 mi)
- Basin size: 900 km2

Basin features
- Progression: Caspian Sea
- Tributaries
  - left: Potskhovistskali

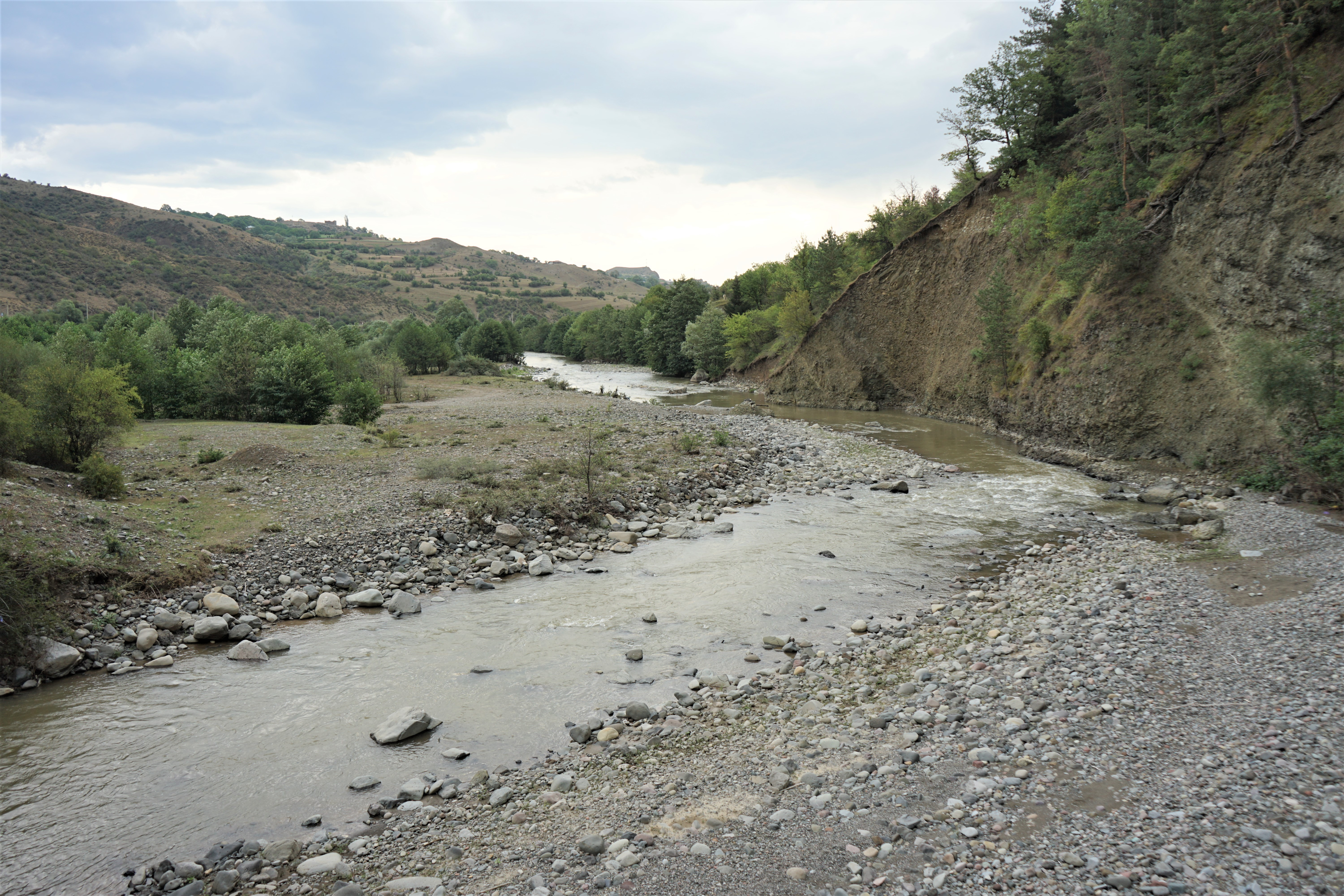
Kvabliani river in Mlashe.

Kvabliani (Georgian: ქვაბლიანი) is a river on the southern slope of the Meskheti Range, in the Khulo and Adigeni municipalities. It originates at 2355 m above sea level. Attached to the river Potskhovistskali from the left. Length 41 km, basin area 900 km. It feeds on snow, rain and groundwater. Floods are known in spring, waterlogging in summer and winter, and floods in autumn. 52% of annual runoff flows in spring, 16% in summer, 20% in autumn and 12% in winter. Frostbite, toss, drizzle, ice cover are common occurrences from November to March. The average annual flow at the confluence is 16.2 m3/ s. Used for irrigation.

== See also ==
- Adigeni
