= 228 Agathe =

Main-belt asteroid

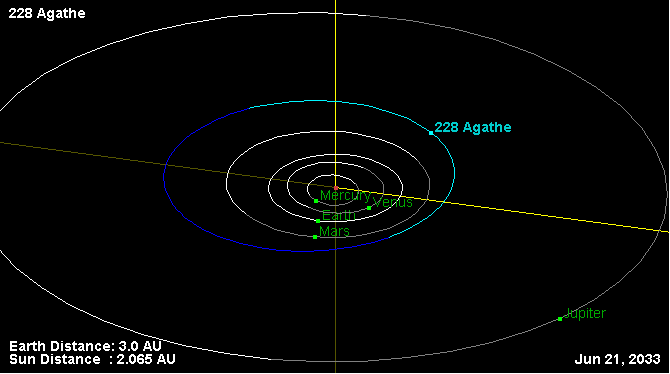
- Orbital diagram

Discovery
- Discovered by: J. Palisa
- Discovery site: Vienna Observatory
- Discovery date: 19 August 1882

Designations
- Named after: daughter of astronomer Theodor v. Oppolzer
- Alternative designations: A882 QA
- Minor planet category: main-belt

Orbital characteristics
- Epoch 13 September 2023 (JD 2453300.5)
- Uncertainty parameter 0
- Observation arc: 130.80 yr
- Aphelion: 2.73 AU (408 million km)
- Perihelion: 1.67 AU (250 million km)
- Semi-major axis: 2.20 AU (329 million km)
- Eccentricity: 0.24227
- Orbital period (sidereal): 3.27 yr (1193.1 d)
- Mean anomaly: 63.67°
- Mean motion: 0° 18^{m} 6.408^{s} / day
- Inclination: 2.5359°
- Longitude of ascending node: 313.25°
- Argument of perihelion: 19.177°
- Earth MOID: 0.657 AU (98.3 million km)
- Mars MOID: 0.29 AU (43 million km)
- Jupiter MOID: 2.63 AU (393 million km)
- T_{Jupiter}: 3.624

Physical characteristics
- Dimensions: 9.30±0.8 km
- Synodic rotation period: 6.484 h (0.2702 d)
- Geometric albedo: 0.2082±0.043
- Spectral type: B–V = 0.918; U–B = 0.596; S (Tholen), S (SMASS)
- Absolute magnitude (H): 12.32

228 Agathe is a stony main belt asteroid, about 9 kilometers in diameter. It was discovered by Johann Palisa on 19 August 1882 at Vienna Observatory, Austria. Photometric observations during 2003 showed a rotation period of 6.48 ± 0.01 hours with a brightness variation of 0.27 ± 0.03 in magnitude. An earlier study yielded results that are consistent with these estimates. Agathe is the lowest numbered asteroid to have an Earth-MOID as low as 0.657 AU (98.3 million km). On 23 August 2029 the asteroid will be 0.659 AU (98.6 million km) from Earth.

228 Agathe Earth approach on 23 August 2029
Date and time of closest approach	Earth distance (AU)	Sun distance (AU)	Velocity relative to Earth (km/s)	Velocity relative to Sun (km/s)	Uncertainty region (3-sigma)	Solar elongation
23 August 2029 ≈07:22	0.6597 AU (98.69 million km; 61.32 million mi; 256.7 LD)	1.67 AU (250 million km; 155 million mi)	3.9	25.7	± 1.4 km	177.9°

Agathe was named after the youngest daughter of Austrian astronomer Theodor von Oppolzer (1841–1886), professor of astronomy in Vienna.
