= 237 Coelestina =

Main-belt asteroid

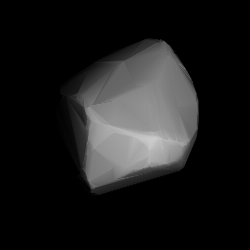

Discovery
- Discovered by: Johann Palisa
- Discovery date: 27 June 1884

Designations
- Pronunciation: /ˌsɛləˈstiːnə, -ˈstaɪnə/ SEL-ə-STEE-nə, -STY-nə
- Alternative designations: A884 MA
- Minor planet category: Main belt

Orbital characteristics
- Epoch 31 July 2016 (JD 2457600.5)
- Uncertainty parameter 0
- Observation arc: 131.81 yr (48143 d)
- Aphelion: 2.96365 AU (443.356 Gm)
- Perihelion: 2.56551 AU (383.795 Gm)
- Semi-major axis: 2.76458 AU (413.575 Gm)
- Eccentricity: 0.072007
- Orbital period (sidereal): 4.597 yr (1,679.0 d)
- Average orbital speed: 17.92 km/s
- Mean anomaly: 253.418°
- Mean motion: 0° 12^{m} 51.905^{s} / day
- Inclination: 9.74247°
- Longitude of ascending node: 84.3141°
- Argument of perihelion: 199.113°

Physical characteristics
- Dimensions: 41.08±1.4 km
- Synodic rotation period: 29.215 h (1.2173 d)
- Geometric albedo: 0.2108±0.016
- Temperature: unknown
- Spectral type: S
- Absolute magnitude (H): 9.24

237 Coelestina is a stony main belt asteroid. It was discovered by Austrian astronomer Johann Palisa on 27 June 1884 in Vienna and was named after Coelestine, wife of astronomer Theodor von Oppolzer. This minor planet is orbiting the Sun at a distance of 2.76 AU with a low eccentricity of 0.072 and an orbital period of 4.60 yr. The orbital plane is inclined at an angle of 9.74° to the plane of the ecliptic.

Photometric data collected during March 2021 was used the generate a lightcurve for 237 Coelestina. This showed a rotation period of 29.062±0.009 h with a brightness variation of 0.24 magnitude.
