= Innsbruck Observatory =

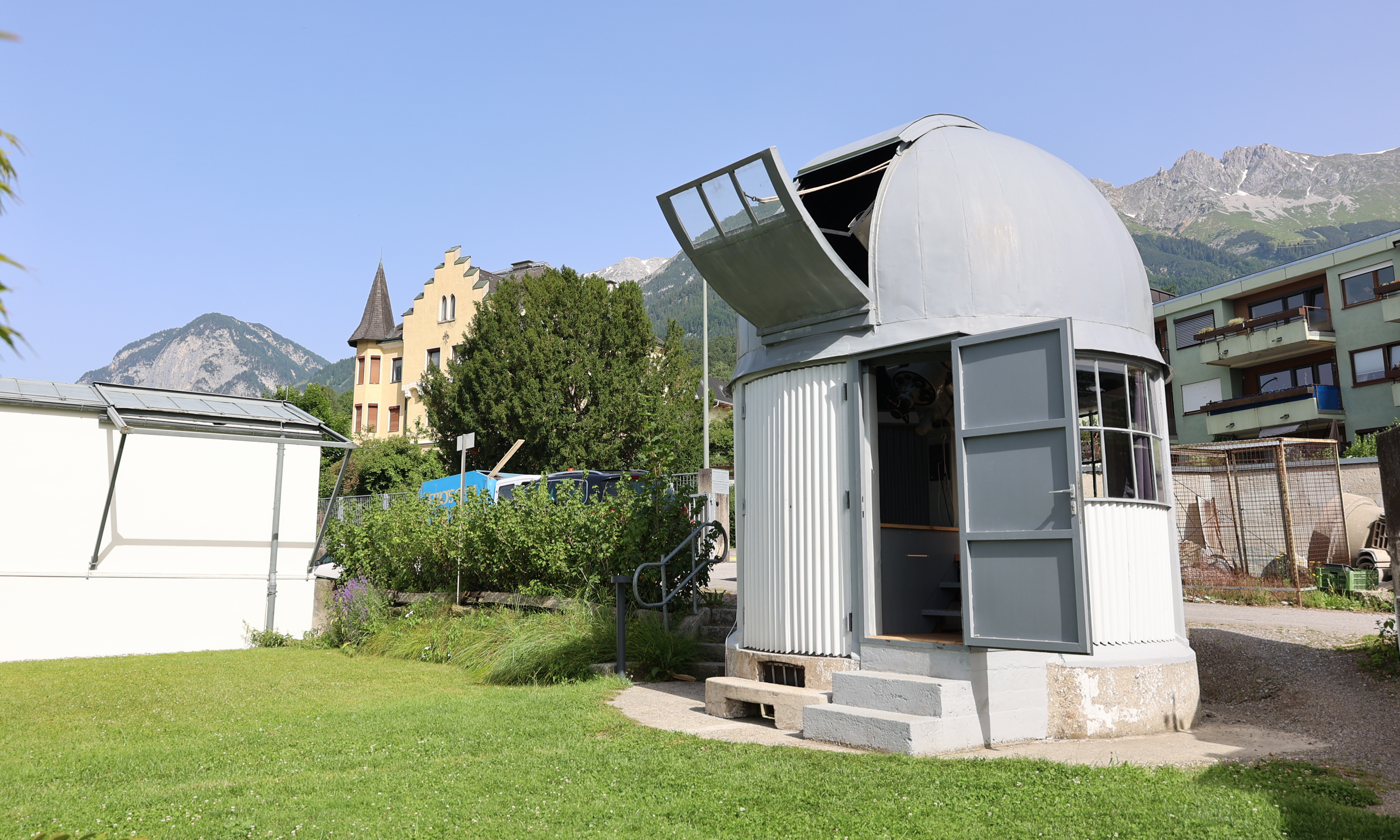
Coudé dome of the historic observatory on the grounds of the Botanical Garden in Hötting, renovated in 2024.

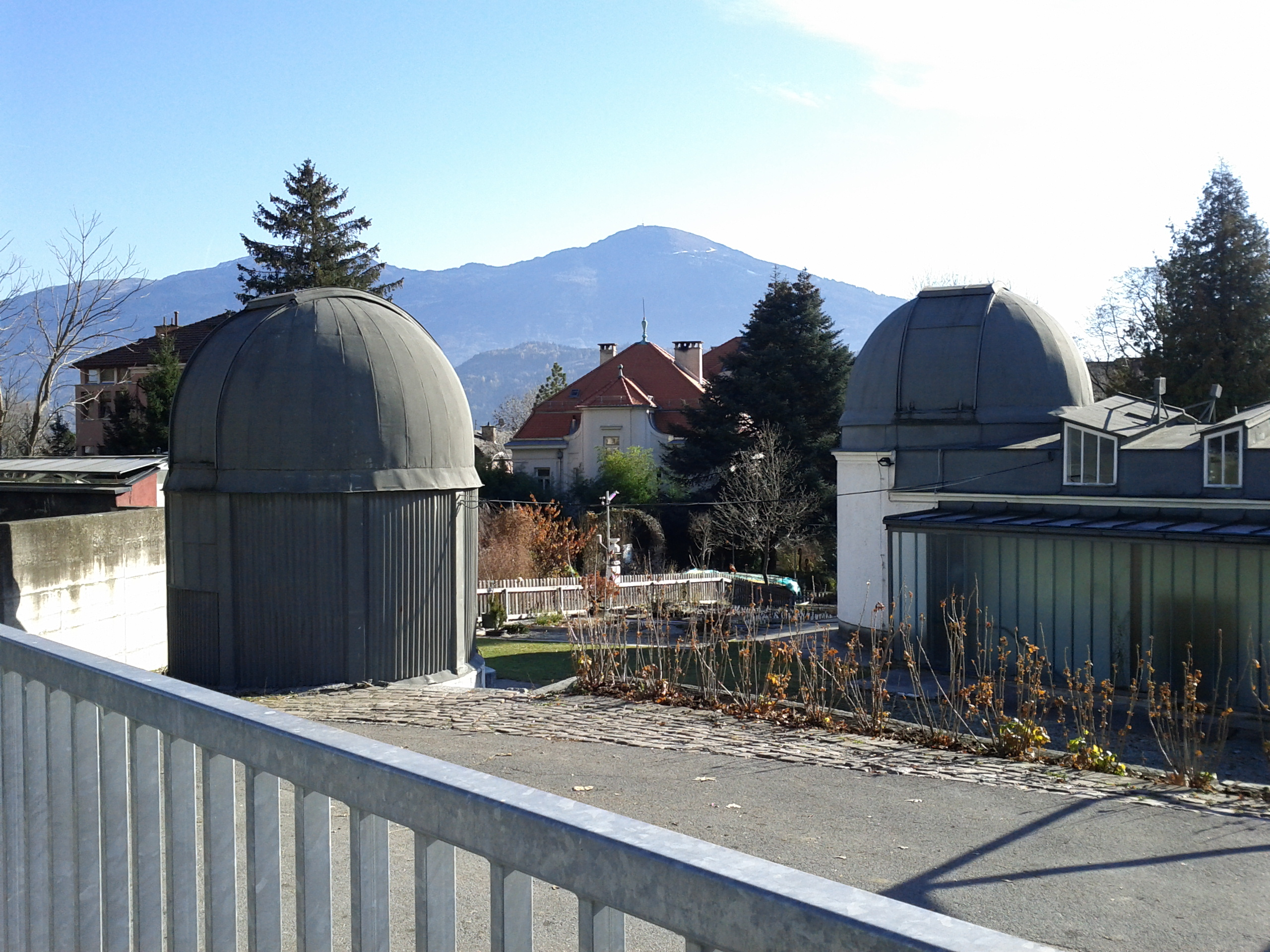
The historic observatory in the Botanical Garden in Hötting: main building (right) and dome with 15 cm Coudé refractor (left).

Innsbruck Observatory (Universitäts-Sternwarte Innsbruck) is an astronomical observatory owned and operated by the institutes of astrophysics out of the University of Innsbruck. It is located in Innsbruck, Austria.

== Historic university observatory Hötting ==
The historic university observatory, also called Oppolzer Observatory (Oppolzersche Sternwarte), was founded in 1904 and is located in what is now the Botanical Garden (47.268272°N 11.380551°E).

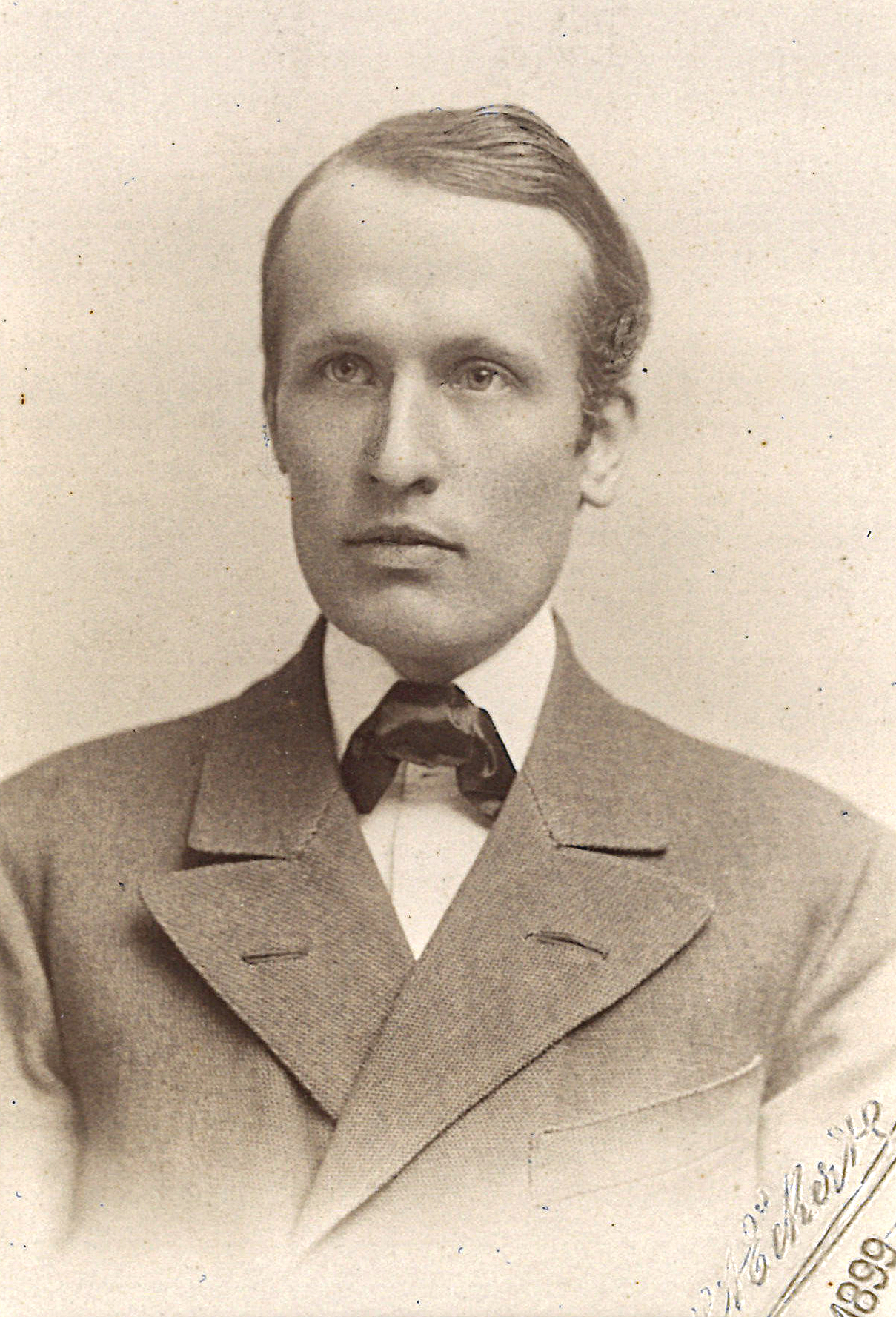
Egon von Oppolzer founded the historic observatory

=== History ===
The University of Innsbruck had a chair for astronomy since Eduard von Haerdtl was appointed in 1892, but no observatory. Egon von Oppolzer, who had been appointed as an associate professor in Innsbruck in 1902, therefore began building an observatory in 1904 according to his own plans near his villa in Hötting. He financed this out of his own pocket, especially by selling his valuable collection of paintings. Only the 40 cm reflecting telescope was financed by the Austrian Academy of Sciences.

Oppolzer died in 1907 at the age of 38, before completing his work. After his death, the state acquired the observatory for 50,000 crowns after lengthy negotiations and incorporated it into the university in 1909. After that, the observatory was used for teaching and research by students and teachers at the University of Innsbruck until the 1950s. The building and equipment remained largely unchanged due to a lack of funds. The original instruments were not replaced by more modern equipment. No structural changes were made.

The observatory formed the basis for the later Institute of Astronomy, today's Institute of Astro- and Particle Physics in the Viktor Franz Hess House on the Technology Campus in Hötting-West. The new Botanical Garden of the University of Innsbruck was created on the acquired land around the observatory.

=== Equipment ===
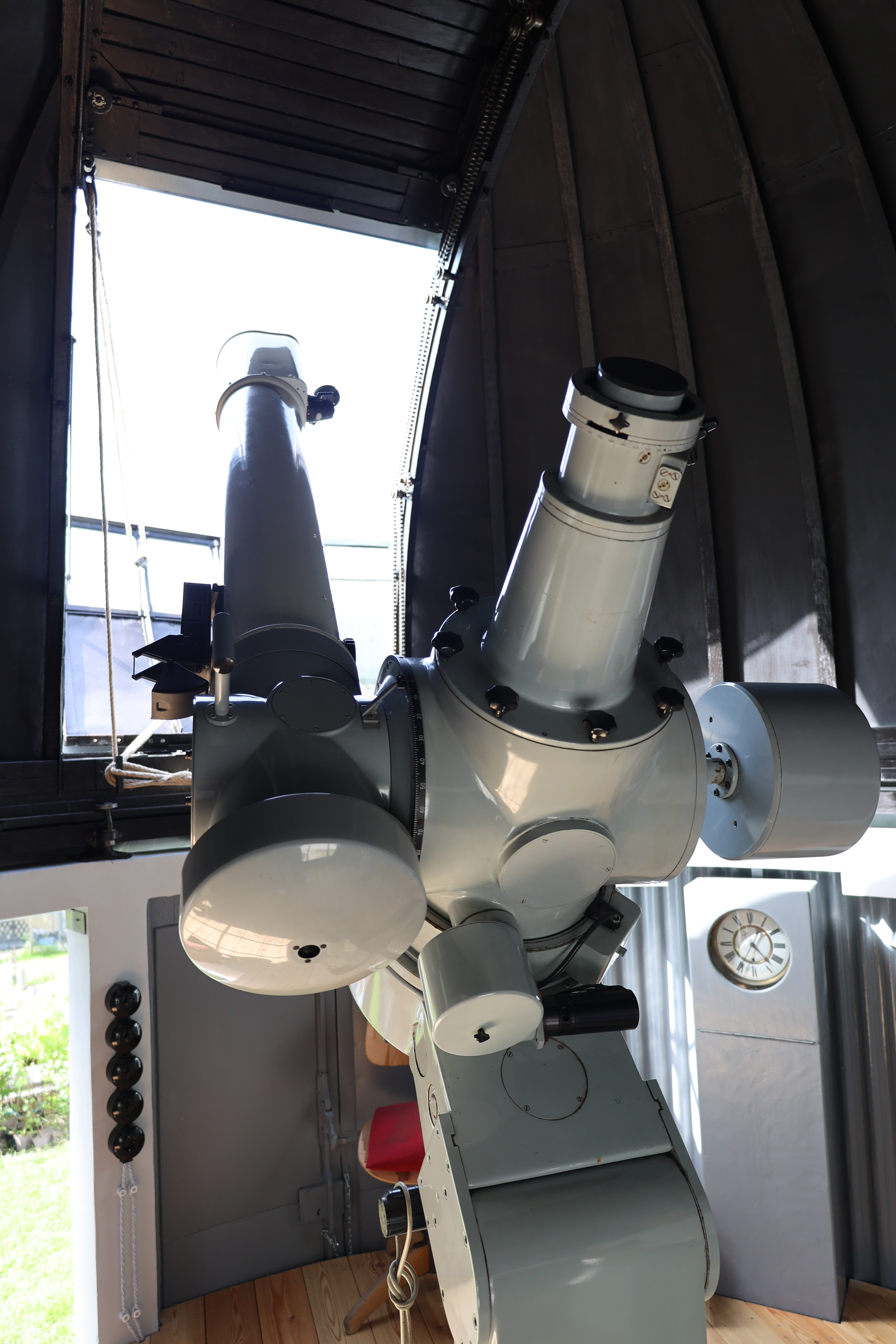
A Zeiss-Coudé lens telescope is located in the free-standing dome, which was renovated in 2024.

The two-storey observatory consists of a meridian room and a dome attached to the east. In order to enable rapid temperature equalisation, it was built in a lightweight construction made of reinforced concrete, corrugated iron and glass. Oppolzer's work rooms and his extensive private library were located in his villa.

The main instrument was a zenith telescope, which was built by Gustav Heyde in Dresden according to Oppolzer's design. In the dome there is a Zeiss mirror telescope with a diameter of 40 cm from 1905, also called the "Academy Reflector" after its sponsor, which was originally intended for stellar spectroscopy. The original equipment also includes a meridian circle and a blink comparator from Zeiss. Most of the historic instruments have been preserved, and the observatory is now a listed building.

The observatory's structure and equipment remained unchanged until after the Second World War. In 1953 and 1968/69 it was expanded under Viktor Oberguggenberger and Josef Fuchs and received, among other things, a darkroom, a seminar room and a small workshop. To the north of the historic observatory stands a free-standing dome, also built in 1904. In 1973 the old telescope was replaced by a Coudé refractor with an aperture of 15 cm, built by Zeiss. This is still used today for teaching and public relations work.

Explanatory videos of astronomical instruments in German, English subtitles
| Reflector telescope (40 cm) | Universal instruments | Blink comparator | Meridian circle | Zenithtelescope | Coudé refracting teleskop | Steinheil refractor |

=== Renovation ===
In 2014, the main building of the observatory in the Botanical Garden was extensively renovated and opened as the "Historic Observatory Museum".

In 2024, the free-standing Coudé dome in the garden was renovated in close coordination with the Bundesimmobiliengesellschaft (BIG) and the Federal Monuments Office. The renovation of the Coudé dome was financed with funds from the BIG and the University of Innsbruck.

== New university observatory on the Technology Campus ==
The new university observatory is located on the roof of the Viktor Franz Hess House, which houses the Institute for Astro- and Particle Physics alongside other scientific institutes, on the Technology Campus in Hötting-West (47°15′50.9″N 11°20′34″E).

When the building was completed in 1986, a dome was built on the roof, in which a Ritchey-Chrétien telescope with a diameter of 60 cm was installed in 1996. It has been in full operation since 1999 and, in addition to training students, is also used for research, particularly into variable stars. The second outburst of the mysterious object V838 Mon was discovered here in February 2002.

== See also ==
- List of astronomical observatories
