= 153 Hilda =

Outer main-belt asteroid

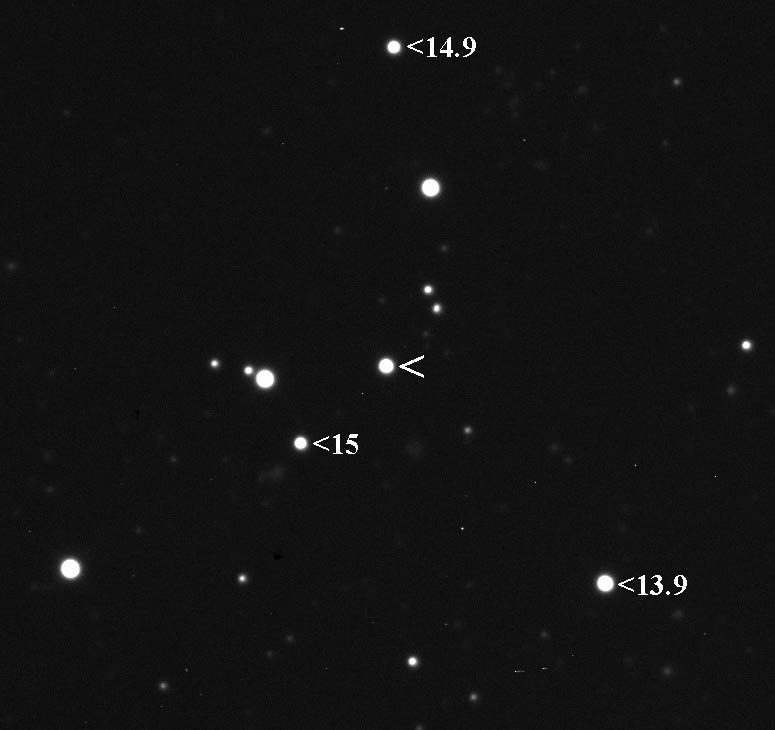
- Star field showing Hilda (apmag 14.2)

Discovery
- Discovered by: J. Palisa
- Discovery site: Austrian Naval Obs.
- Discovery date: 2 November 1875

Designations
- Pronunciation: /ˈhɪldə/
- Alternative designations: A875 VC; 1935 GD
- Minor planet category: Main belt (Hilda)
- Adjectives: Hildian /ˈhɪldiən/

Orbital characteristics
- Epoch 31 July 2016 (JD 2457600.5)
- Uncertainty parameter 0
- Observation arc: 121.05 yr (44215 d)
- Aphelion: 4.5341 AU (678.29 Gm)
- Perihelion: 3.4225 AU (512.00 Gm)
- Semi-major axis: 3.9783 AU (595.15 Gm)
- Eccentricity: 0.13971
- Orbital period (sidereal): 7.935 yr (2,898.3 d) 7.94 yr (2898.3 d)
- Mean anomaly: 51.690°
- Mean motion: 0° 7^{m} 27.156^{s} / day
- Inclination: 7.8249°
- Longitude of ascending node: 228.16°
- Argument of perihelion: 38.617°
- Jupiter MOID: 0.569657 AU (85.2195 Gm)
- T_{Jupiter}: 3.023

Physical characteristics
- Dimensions: 170.63±3.3 km
- Mass: ~5.2×10^{18} kg
- Equatorial escape velocity: ~ 6 m/s
- Synodic rotation period: 5.9587 h (0.24828 d)
- Geometric albedo: 0.0618±0.002
- Spectral type: P
- Absolute magnitude (H): 7.48

153 Hilda is a large asteroid in the outer main belt, with a diameter of 170 km. The spectrum matches that of a P-type asteroid. It was discovered by Johann Palisa on 2 November 1875, from the Austrian Naval Observatory at Pula, now Croatia. The name was chosen by the astronomer Theodor von Oppolzer, who named it after one of his daughters. It is the largest member of the Hilda family, a collisional family of asteroids in the Hilda region.

== Orbit and family ==
A schematic of the orbit of 153 Hilda (green), with Jupiter (red). The open red circles are the Jovian Lagrange points that Hilda approaches. (Note: Based on orbital data from the year 2000. Hilda seldom approaches the Lagrangians exactly.)

Hilda gives its name to an asteroid group called the Hilda group (or Hildas for short). It is not a true asteroid family, since the members are not physically related, but rather share similar orbital elements. The Hildas are locked in a 2:3 orbital resonance with Jupiter; since Jupiter takes 11.9 years to orbit the Sun while Hilda takes 7.9 years, Jupiter orbits the Sun twice for every 3 orbits that Hilda completes. There are over 1,100 other objects known to be in a 2:3 resonance with Jupiter. The asteroid is, however, the largest member of the ancient physically related Hilda family within the dynamical group of the same name.

The orbital plane of 153 Hilda is inclined at an angle of 7.82° to the plane of the ecliptic. It has an orbital eccentricity (ovalness) of 0.13971. Multiple light curves of the asteroid provide a consistent rotation period of approximately 5.9585 h
