= Abastumani (Adigeni municipality) =

Abastumani აბასთუმანი
- Village
- Location of Abastumani Abastumani (Georgia)
- Coordinates: 41°42′20″N 42°50′35″E
- Country: Georgia
- Region: Samtskhe-Javakheti
- Municipality: Adigeni
- Elevation: 1,160 m (3,810 ft)

Population (2014)
  - Total: 256
- Time zone: UTC+4 (Georgian Time)

Abastumani (Georgian: აბასთუმანი) is a village in the Adigeni Municipality, Samtskhe-Javakheti, Georgia. It is located on the southern slopes of the Meskheti Range on the left bank of the Otskhe river. It is at an elevation of 1,160 metres (3,810 ft).

== Population ==
2002 census: 371
2014 census: 256
