= 1911 Schubart =

Dark Hilda asteroid

Discovery
- Discovered by: P. Wild
- Discovery site: Zimmerwald Obs.
- Discovery date: 25 October 1973

Designations
- Named after: Joachim Schubart (German astronomer)
- Alternative designations: 1973 UD · 1928 DW; 1933 UX_{1} · 1941 SU_{1} 1951 AH_{1} · 1952 DS_{2} 1960 EF · 1968 FM; 1972 RO · 1972 TY_{4}
- Minor planet category: main-belt · (outer); Hilda · Schubart

Orbital characteristics
- Epoch 4 September 2017 (JD 2458000.5)
- Uncertainty parameter 0
- Observation arc: 89.27 yr (32,606 days)
- Aphelion: 4.6512 AU
- Perihelion: 3.3013 AU
- Semi-major axis: 3.9762 AU
- Eccentricity: 0.1697
- Orbital period (sidereal): 7.93 yr (2,896 days)
- Mean anomaly: 136.84°
- Mean motion: 0° 7^{m} 27.48^{s} / day
- Inclination: 1.6431°
- Longitude of ascending node: 284.84°
- Argument of perihelion: 181.75°
- Jupiter MOID: 0.5059 AU
- T_{Jupiter}: 3.0310

Physical characteristics
- Dimensions: 64.66±23.84 km 67.476±0.504 km 80.09±2.0 km 80.11 km (derived); 80.13±1.25 km
- Synodic rotation period: 7.91±0.02 h 11.915±0.002 h
- Geometric albedo: 0.0249±0.001; 0.025±0.001; 0.0316 (derived); 0.035±0.001; 0.04±0.01; 0.04±0.03
- Spectral type: Tholen = P · C/P; B–V = 0.701; U–B = 0.217
- Absolute magnitude (H): 9.85 · 10.11

1911 Schubart, provisional designation 1973 UD, is a dark Hildian asteroid and parent body of the Schubart family, located in the outermost region of the asteroid belt, approximately 70 kilometers in diameter. It was discovered on 25 October 1973, by Swiss astronomer Paul Wild at Zimmerwald Observatory, near Bern, Switzerland. The asteroid was named after German astronomer Joachim Schubart.

== Orbit and classification ==
With a diameter of 65–80 kilometers, it is one of the largest members of the Hilda group of asteroids, which are in 3:2 orbital resonance with the gas-giant Jupiter. More specifically, it is the parent body and namesake of the Schubart family (002), one of two asteroid families within the Hilda group (the other one is the Hilda family itself). It is the darkest P-type asteroid with a very low geometric albedo of 0.0249.

The body's observation arc begins with its first identification as 1928 DW at Heidelberg Observatory in February 1928, more than 45 years prior to its official discovery observation at Zimmerwald .

== Physical characteristics ==
In the Tholen classification, Schubart is a primitive P-type asteroid. The Wide-field Infrared Survey Explorer (WISE) characterized it as both P- and C-type asteroid.

=== Diameter and albedo ===
According to the surveys carried out by the Infrared Astronomical Satellite IRAS, the Japanese Akari satellite and the NEOWISE mission of NASA's WISE telescope, Schubart measures between 64.66 and 80.13 kilometers in diameter and its surface has an albedo between 0.0249 and 0.04.

The Collaborative Asteroid Lightcurve Link derives an albedo of 0.0316 and a diameter of 80.11 kilometers based on an absolute magnitude of 9.85.

=== Rotation period ===
Two rotational lightcurves of Schubart were obtained from photometric observations by Johan Warell and Robert Stephens in 2015 and 2016, respectively. Lightcurve analysis gave a rotation period of 7.91 and 11.915 hours with a brightness amplitude of 0.11 and 0.22 in magnitude, respectively (U=2/2).

== Naming ==
The minor planet is named in after German ARI-astronomer Joachim Schubart (born 1928), who is also a discoverer of minor planets, namely 2000 Herschel and 4724 Brocken. He studied in detail members of the Hilda family, as he developed an averaging techniques for observing the long-term motions of asteroids. Schubart has also been an active member on several commissions of the International Astronomical Union. The official naming citation was published by the Minor Planet Center on 20 February 1976 (M.P.C. 3937).
