= Hilda family =

Asteroid family

The Hilda family (001) is an ancient collisional asteroid family of at least 409 known asteroids, named for its largest member, the 170-kilometre (110 mi)-across asteroid 153 Hilda. It lies within the larger dynamical group of Hilda asteroids, a group of asteroids in the 3:2 orbital resonance with Jupiter. All members of the family are dark P-type asteroids with albedos of around 0.06. Another asteroid family in the Hilda dynamical group is the Schubart family, named for its largest member, 1911 Schubart.

An asteroid family is a group of physically related asteroids usually created by a collision with an original larger asteroid, with the fragments continuing on similar orbits to the original. This is distinct from a dynamical group in that the members of a dynamical group only share similar orbits because of gravitational interactions with planets, which concentrate asteroids in a particular orbital range. Members of the Hilda family are both part of the wider Hilda dynamical group, and fragments of 153 Hilda. The family is considered a non-catastrophic asteroid family because 153 Hilda, its largest member, makes up nearly 3/4 of the family's total mass, rather than simply being the largest of a number of fragments each making up a small fraction of the original destroyed asteroid.

The family is believed to be one of the oldest collisional families ever discovered, with an estimated age of likely 4 billion years. Models based on the modern Solar System indicate it being very unlikely for an asteroid as large as 153 Hilda to suffer a collision large enough to create its family, even over the course of billions of years of encounters with other asteroids, leading to a 2011 study to propose that the family-creating impact event happened during the Late Heavy Bombardment, when impact rates in the Solar System were briefly much higher.

== Large members ==

- 153 Hilda: 51.8 (71.4%)
- 1212 Francette: 3.97 (5.5%)
- 1746 Brouwer: 2.45 (3.4%)
- 1529 Oterma: 2.48 (3.4%)
- 3134 Kostinsky: 1.14 (1.6%)
- 1038 Tuckia: 0.969 (1.3%)
- 3990 Heimdal: 0.573 (0.8%)
- 4317 Garibaldi: 0.566 (0.8%)
- 3571 Milanstefanik: 0.423 (0.6%)
- 3561 Devine: 0.417 (0.6%)
- all other members: 7.74 (10.7%)
Mass distribution of the Hilda family (assuming similar densities)

The 10 brightest Hilda family members
Name	Abs. Mag	Size (km)	proper a (AU)	proper e	proper i
153 Hilda	7.8	171	3.9653	0.174	8.917
1212 Francette	9.6	76	3.9674	0.230	7.237
1746 Brouwer	10.0	63	3.9631	0.141	9.251
1529 Oterma	10.0	56	3.9643	0.154	7.870
3134 Kostinsky	10.5	50	3.9658	0.184	8.966
1038 Tuckia	10.7	58	3.9648	0.164	8.239
3990 Heimdal	11.0	36	3.9651	0.168	9.641
4317 Garibaldi	11.1	39	3.9670	0.213	9.165
3571 Milanstefanik	11.3	35	3.9620	0.127	9.210
3561 Devine	11.3	33	3.9623	0.133	8.581
