= Adigeni =

Borough in Samtskhe-Javakheti, Georgia

Adigeni ადიგენი
- Borough
- Location in Georgia Adigeni (Samtskhe-Javakheti)
- Coordinates: 41°40′30″N 42°42′12″E
- Country: Georgia
- Region: Samtskhe-Javakheti
- Municipality: Adigeni
- Borough from: 1961
- Elevation: 1,240 m (4,070 ft)

Population (2014)
  - Total: 783
- Time zone: UTC+4 (Georgian Time)

Adigeni (Georgian: ადიგენი) is a small town (daba) in eponymous municipality, Samtskhe-Javakheti, Georgia. It is located at the Akhaltsikhe structural basin, on the Kvabliani riverside, 32 km to the west of the regional center of Akhaltsikhe. As of the 2014 census, it had a population of 783. In the daba there are administrative, cultural, educational and healthcare offices.

== See also ==
- Samtskhe-Javakheti
