= Tatar (term) =

Term

Tatar is a term that has been used to describe Central Asian and Mongolian-speaking peoples, and emmisaries in the Ottoman Empire.

The Orkhon inscriptions, a group of 8th-century Old Turkic texts, include the first instances of the term (otuz tatar, toquz tatar), where it most probably referred to a group of Mongolian-speaking tribes. Certain western groups of these tribes were later associated with Turkic tribes. Although the Tatar confederation was a longtime archenemy to Genghis Khan and his ancestors, later sources employed the term for most Mongol conquerors, the reason for which remains unclear.

In the year 1236, according to a Russian annalist: "there came from the countries of the East into the Bulgar lands the godless Tatars and sacked the good city of Bolgar and killed everyone from the old to the young and the tiniest suckling". It is likely the first time that the name Tatar was used in connection with the region. In Russia and the rest of Europe, as well as India, Persia, and among the Arabs, the term continued to be used over the term Mongol.

Within the Ottoman Empire, the term gained the new meaning of "court messenger", replacing ulak, coinciding with the undated establishment of the Tatar Corps (Ottoman Turkish: Tatarān ocağı), known to have undergone reorganization in 1775. Several contemporary travelers and modern historians associated the rise of the term with the potential employment of Crimean Tatar refugees by the Ottoman government.

== Bibliography ==
- Bukharaev, Ravil (3 June 2014). Islam in Russia: The Four Seasons. Routledge. ISBN 978-1-136-80793-0.
- Koh, Choon Hwee (2024). The Sublime Post: How the Ottoman Imperial Post Became a Public Service. Yale University Press. ISBN 9780300270532.
- Lane, George (25 January 2018). A Short History of the Mongols. Bloomsbury Publishing. ISBN 978-1-78672-339-0.
- Vàsàry, Istvàn (24 March 2005). Cumans and Tatars: Oriental Military in the Pre-Ottoman Balkans, 1185–1365. Cambridge University Press. ISBN 9781139444088. OCLC 750757219.
