= Adigeni Municipality =

Coordinates: 41°40′37″N 42°42′31″E

Adigeni Municipality ადიგენის მუნიციპალიტეტი
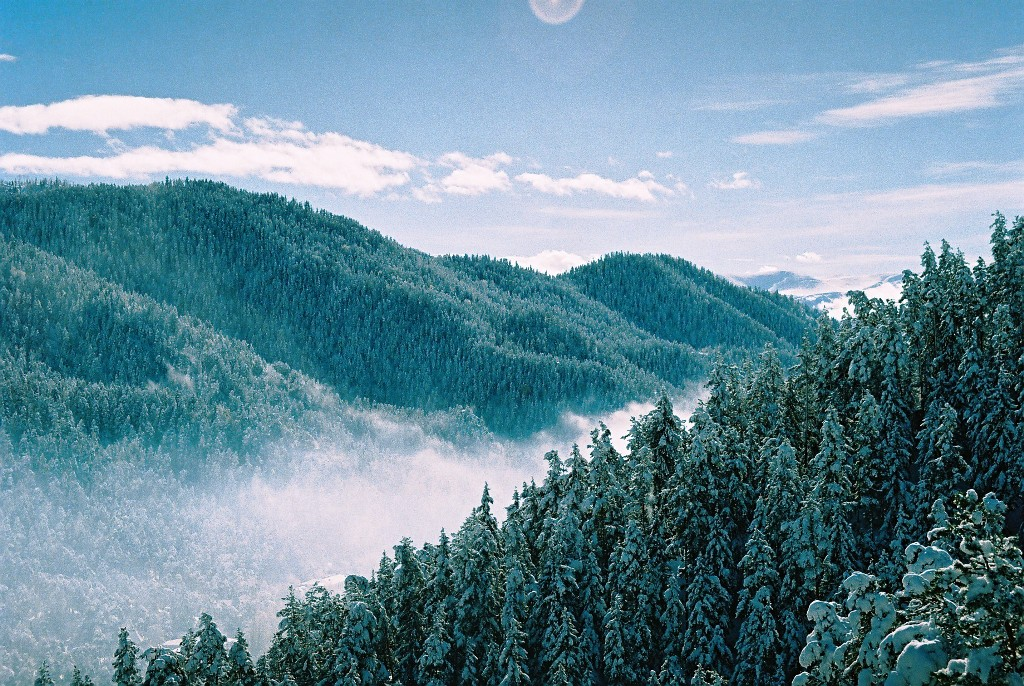
- Abastumani

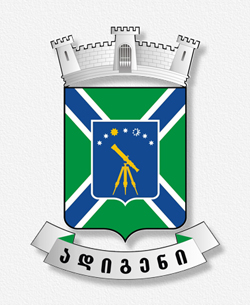
- Flag Seal

- Country: Georgia
- Mkhare: Samtskhe-Javakheti
- Capital: Adigeni

Government
  - Type: Mayor–Council
  - Mayor: Gocha Qimadze (GD)
  - Municipal Assembly: 33 members: • Georgian Dream (24); • UNM (9)

Area
  - Total: 799.5 km^{2} (308.7 sq mi)

Population (2021)
  - Total: 16,092
  - Density: 20.13/km^{2} (52.13/sq mi)
- Time zone: UTC+4 (Georgian Time)
- Website: adigeni.ge

Adigeni (Georgian: ადიგენის მუნიციპალიტეტი) is a municipality in Georgia's southern region of Samtskhe-Javakheti. Covering an area of about 799.5 km^{2} (309 sq mi). As of 2021 it had a population of 16,092 people. The borough (daba) Adigeni is its administrative centre.

== Administrative divisions ==
Adigeni municipality is administratively divided into two boroughs (Adigeni and Abastumani), 18 communities (თემი, temi), and 55 villages (სოფელი, sopeli).

== Politics ==
Adigeni Municipal Assembly (Georgian: ადიგენის საკრებულო) is the representative body in Adigeni Municipality, consisting of 33 members which is elected every four years. The last election was held in October 2021. Gocha Qimadze of Georgian Dream was elected mayor and the ruling Georgian Dream remained a dominant force in Adigeni.

Party	2017	2021	Current Municipal Assembly
Georgian Dream	23	21	
United National Movement	1	9	
People's Power		3 (Note: Split from Georgian Dream.)	
European Georgia	5		
Alliance of Patriots	1		
Total	30	33	

== Population ==
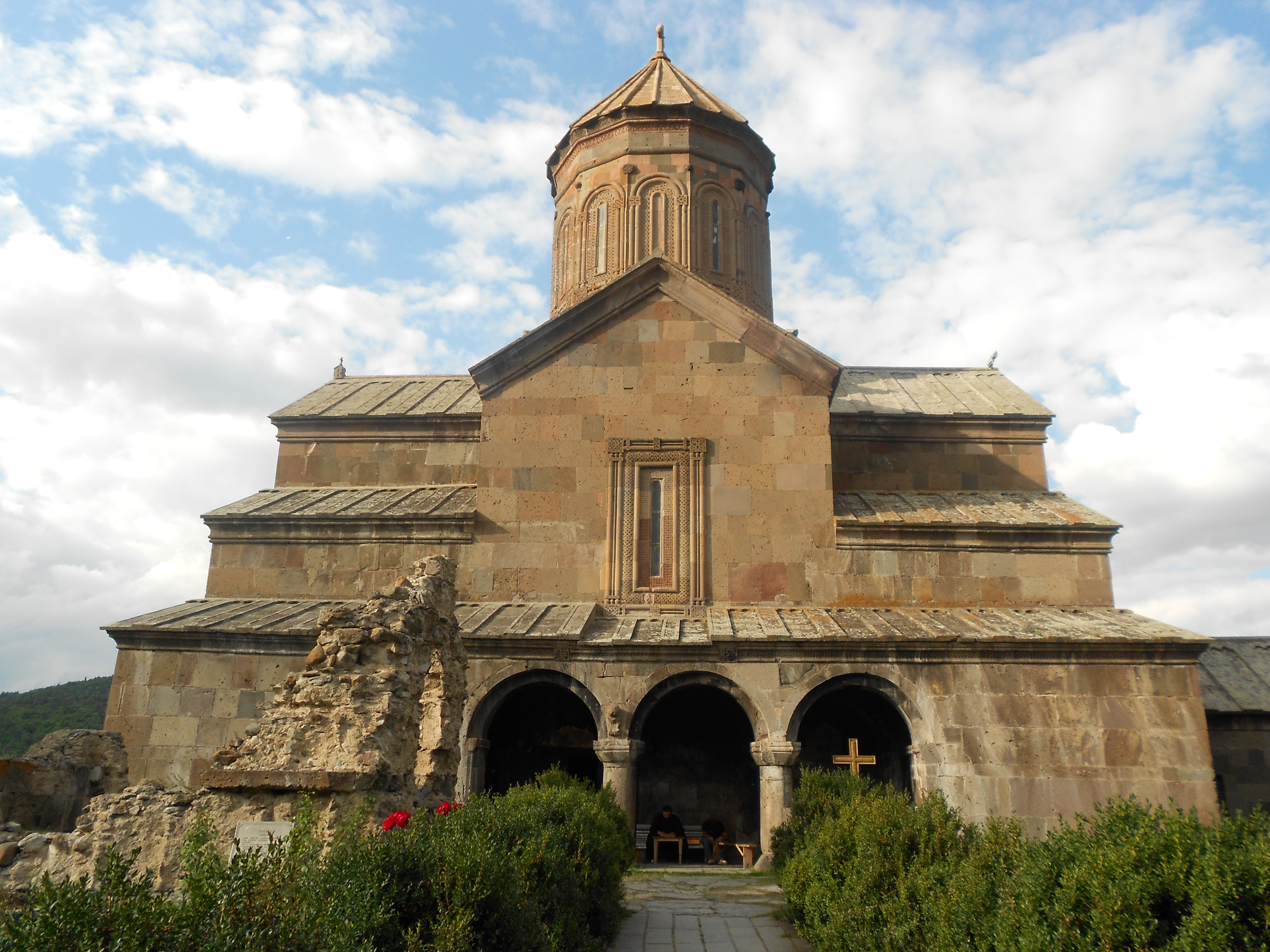
Zarzma monastery

By the start of 2021 the population was determined at 16,092 people, a slight decrease compared to the 2014 census. The population density of the municipality is 20.1 inhabitants per square kilometre (52/sq mi).

The population of Adigeni is practically monoethnic Georgian. By far the largest ethnic minority are the Armenians (almost 400, 2.2%) who mainly live in Abastumani and make up 18% of the population there. Other minorities are several dozen Russians and a few Azerbaijanis, Ossetes, Ukrainians, Abkhazians and Pontic Greeks. Furthermore, 67.7% of the population consists of followers of the Georgian Orthodox Church and 20.1% is Muslim. Another large group by Georgian standards are the Catholics (10%). Furthermore, there are small numbers of followers of the Armenian Apostolic Church and Jehovah's Witnesses.

Population Adigeni Municipality
	1886	1923	1939	1959	1970	1979	1989	2002	2014	2021
Adigeni Municipality	17,983	-	▲41,314	▼19,593	▲20,272	▲20,278	▲21,284	▼20,752	▼16,462	▼16,092
Adigeni daba	-	-	656	▲1,200	▼859	▲981	▲1,309	▼980	▼783	▲975
Abastumani daba	-	1,244	▲3,001	▲3,521	▼3,253	▼2,935	▼2,564	▼1,368	▼937	▼723
Data: Population statistics Georgia 1897 to present. Note: (Note: The 2014 census found an inexplicable gap with the data from the national statistical office Geostat. UN-assisted research has found the 2002 census was inflated by about 8-9 percent. See, "1. Introduction", Page 1.)

In November 1944, the Meskhetian Turks, a Turkish-speaking ethnic group of predominantly Muslim faith living in this area, were deported to Soviet Central Asian republics as part of a Stalinist resettlement operation. At that time, the Meskhetians constituted three quarters of the population of the rajon Adigeni (1939: 32,923 of the 41,314 inhabitants). Attempts to return them to independent Georgia have failed, with local resistance.

== See also ==
- List of municipalities in Georgia (country)
