= List of minor planets: 387001–388000 =

The following is a partial list of minor planets, running from minor-planet number 387001 through 388000, inclusive. The primary data for this and other partial lists is based on JPL's "Small-Body Orbital Elements" and data available from the Minor Planet Center. Critical list information is also provided by the MPC, unless otherwise specified from Lowell Observatory. A detailed description of the table's columns and additional sources are given on the main page including a complete list of every page in this series, and a statistical break-up on the dynamical classification of minor planets.

Also see the summary list of all named bodies in numerical and alphabetical order, and the corresponding naming citations for the number range of this particular list. New namings may only be added to this list after official publication, as the preannouncement of names is condemned by the Working Group for Small Bodies Nomenclature of the International Astronomical Union.

Near-Earth obj.	MBA (inner)	MBA (outer)	Centaur
Mars-crosser	MBA (middle)	Jupiter trojan	Trans-Neptunian obj.
Unclassified

== 387001–387100 ==
Designation			Discovery			Properties		Ref
Permanent	Provisional	Named after	Date	Site	Discoverer(s)	Category	Diam.	Ref
387001	2012 RJ_{3}	—	October 25, 2008	Catalina	CSS	·	1.5 km	MPC · JPL
387002	2012 RY_{5}	—	November 21, 2001	Socorro	LINEAR	·	3.1 km	MPC · JPL
387003	2012 RL_{6}	—	February 25, 2006	Kitt Peak	Spacewatch	·	2.7 km	MPC · JPL
387004	2012 RD_{7}	—	March 10, 2007	Mount Lemmon	Mount Lemmon Survey	NYS	1.7 km	MPC · JPL
387005	2012 RY_{7}	—	February 15, 2010	Mount Lemmon	Mount Lemmon Survey	·	2.6 km	MPC · JPL
387006	2012 RH_{12}	—	July 18, 2006	Siding Spring	SSS	T_{j} (2.98)	4.8 km	MPC · JPL
387007	2012 RK_{12}	—	December 7, 2005	Kitt Peak	Spacewatch	ERI	2.0 km	MPC · JPL
387008	2012 RW_{12}	—	October 25, 2008	Catalina	CSS	MAR	1.8 km	MPC · JPL
387009	2012 RX_{13}	—	February 14, 2005	Kitt Peak	Spacewatch	·	2.9 km	MPC · JPL
387010	2012 RP_{16}	—	March 8, 2006	Kitt Peak	Spacewatch	·	2.7 km	MPC · JPL
387011	2012 RS_{17}	—	May 26, 2011	Kitt Peak	Spacewatch	SUL	1.9 km	MPC · JPL
387012	2012 RR_{18}	—	January 31, 2006	Mount Lemmon	Mount Lemmon Survey	MAR	1.2 km	MPC · JPL
387013	2012 RB_{23}	—	October 30, 2008	Kitt Peak	Spacewatch	·	1.6 km	MPC · JPL
387014	2012 RH_{23}	—	January 16, 2004	Kitt Peak	Spacewatch	·	2.1 km	MPC · JPL
387015	2012 RW_{24}	—	September 10, 2001	Socorro	LINEAR	·	2.7 km	MPC · JPL
387016	2012 RB_{28}	—	September 18, 2003	Socorro	LINEAR	·	2.2 km	MPC · JPL
387017	2012 RM_{33}	—	September 16, 2003	Kitt Peak	Spacewatch	HOF	2.8 km	MPC · JPL
387018	2012 RR_{33}	—	March 10, 2007	Kitt Peak	Spacewatch	·	1.6 km	MPC · JPL
387019	2012 RO_{34}	—	September 15, 2007	Kitt Peak	Spacewatch	·	2.1 km	MPC · JPL
387020	2012 RZ_{38}	—	June 30, 2008	Kitt Peak	Spacewatch	·	1.8 km	MPC · JPL
387021	2012 RM_{41}	—	February 24, 2006	Kitt Peak	Spacewatch	·	3.4 km	MPC · JPL
387022	2012 SS	—	February 14, 2010	Mount Lemmon	Mount Lemmon Survey	·	2.1 km	MPC · JPL
387023	2012 SM_{3}	—	August 2, 2000	Kitt Peak	Spacewatch	THM	2.5 km	MPC · JPL
387024	2012 SG_{7}	—	March 12, 2005	Kitt Peak	Spacewatch	·	2.0 km	MPC · JPL
387025	2012 SY_{7}	—	September 10, 2007	Mount Lemmon	Mount Lemmon Survey	KOR	1.4 km	MPC · JPL
387026	2012 SW_{9}	—	September 24, 2008	Catalina	CSS	·	2.2 km	MPC · JPL
387027	2012 SA_{10}	—	October 24, 2008	Kitt Peak	Spacewatch	·	1.7 km	MPC · JPL
387028	2012 SP_{10}	—	October 17, 2010	Mount Lemmon	Mount Lemmon Survey	L4	10 km	MPC · JPL
387029	2012 SN_{15}	—	March 31, 2003	Anderson Mesa	LONEOS	·	1.8 km	MPC · JPL
387030	2012 SS_{15}	—	January 13, 2005	Kitt Peak	Spacewatch	·	2.2 km	MPC · JPL
387031	2012 SP_{16}	—	October 1, 2003	Kitt Peak	Spacewatch	·	2.1 km	MPC · JPL
387032	2012 SG_{28}	—	October 9, 2004	Kitt Peak	Spacewatch	·	1.3 km	MPC · JPL
387033	2012 SO_{32}	—	October 8, 2007	Catalina	CSS	·	1.8 km	MPC · JPL
387034	2012 SD_{38}	—	October 1, 2008	Mount Lemmon	Mount Lemmon Survey	·	1.1 km	MPC · JPL
387035	2012 SS_{46}	—	September 14, 1999	Kitt Peak	Spacewatch	·	1.5 km	MPC · JPL
387036	2012 SU_{53}	—	December 16, 2004	Kitt Peak	Spacewatch	·	1.7 km	MPC · JPL
387037	2012 SJ_{54}	—	November 13, 2007	Mount Lemmon	Mount Lemmon Survey	·	2.3 km	MPC · JPL
387038	2012 SU_{57}	—	September 7, 1999	Socorro	LINEAR	·	850 m	MPC · JPL
387039	2012 SO_{64}	—	November 6, 2008	Mount Lemmon	Mount Lemmon Survey	·	2.5 km	MPC · JPL
387040	2012 SF_{66}	—	October 9, 2007	Catalina	CSS	·	2.2 km	MPC · JPL
387041	2012 TF_{6}	—	September 22, 2008	Mount Lemmon	Mount Lemmon Survey	·	1.6 km	MPC · JPL
387042	2012 TK_{7}	—	December 20, 2007	Kitt Peak	Spacewatch	·	2.4 km	MPC · JPL
387043	2012 TS_{7}	—	September 9, 2007	Kitt Peak	Spacewatch	EOS	1.9 km	MPC · JPL
387044	2012 TV_{8}	—	March 10, 2005	Mount Lemmon	Mount Lemmon Survey	AGN	1.5 km	MPC · JPL
387045	2012 TO_{10}	—	November 9, 2007	Kitt Peak	Spacewatch	·	1.8 km	MPC · JPL
387046	2012 TO_{11}	—	April 15, 1997	Kitt Peak	Spacewatch	·	2.1 km	MPC · JPL
387047	2012 TD_{16}	—	March 24, 2006	Kitt Peak	Spacewatch	·	1.6 km	MPC · JPL
387048	2012 TH_{17}	—	August 24, 2008	Kitt Peak	Spacewatch	·	1.5 km	MPC · JPL
387049	2012 TD_{18}	—	November 23, 2009	Kitt Peak	Spacewatch	·	860 m	MPC · JPL
387050	2012 TO_{19}	—	December 1, 2003	Kitt Peak	Spacewatch	·	2.5 km	MPC · JPL
387051	2012 TU_{20}	—	November 6, 2008	Kitt Peak	Spacewatch	NEM	2.3 km	MPC · JPL
387052	2012 TC_{23}	—	October 18, 2003	Kitt Peak	Spacewatch	AGN	1.2 km	MPC · JPL
387053	2012 TL_{23}	—	November 2, 2008	Mount Lemmon	Mount Lemmon Survey	·	1.9 km	MPC · JPL
387054	2012 TL_{29}	—	April 24, 2006	Kitt Peak	Spacewatch	AST	1.8 km	MPC · JPL
387055	2012 TA_{31}	—	September 11, 2001	Kitt Peak	Spacewatch	THM	2.2 km	MPC · JPL
387056	2012 TU_{31}	—	September 27, 2003	Kitt Peak	Spacewatch	·	2.0 km	MPC · JPL
387057	2012 TH_{32}	—	September 11, 2007	Mount Lemmon	Mount Lemmon Survey	KOR	1.4 km	MPC · JPL
387058	2012 TB_{37}	—	March 17, 2005	Kitt Peak	Spacewatch	EOS	1.9 km	MPC · JPL
387059	2012 TX_{48}	—	September 18, 2003	Kitt Peak	Spacewatch	·	1.4 km	MPC · JPL
387060	2012 TH_{49}	—	March 9, 1997	Kitt Peak	Spacewatch	V	530 m	MPC · JPL
387061	2012 TN_{50}	—	September 14, 2007	Mount Lemmon	Mount Lemmon Survey	·	2.1 km	MPC · JPL
387062	2012 TQ_{54}	—	October 29, 2008	Kitt Peak	Spacewatch	·	1.8 km	MPC · JPL
387063	2012 TV_{54}	—	December 11, 2004	Campo Imperatore	CINEOS	·	1.9 km	MPC · JPL
387064	2012 TE_{55}	—	September 19, 2001	Socorro	LINEAR	·	1.5 km	MPC · JPL
387065	2012 TZ_{55}	—	August 21, 2007	Anderson Mesa	LONEOS	·	2.3 km	MPC · JPL
387066	2012 TO_{59}	—	March 15, 2007	Mount Lemmon	Mount Lemmon Survey	V	820 m	MPC · JPL
387067	2012 TC_{71}	—	February 9, 2005	Mount Lemmon	Mount Lemmon Survey	·	2.6 km	MPC · JPL
387068	2012 TT_{71}	—	August 10, 2007	Kitt Peak	Spacewatch	HOF	2.5 km	MPC · JPL
387069	2012 TO_{73}	—	October 20, 2008	Kitt Peak	Spacewatch	·	1.5 km	MPC · JPL
387070	2012 TZ_{81}	—	October 1, 2003	Kitt Peak	Spacewatch	·	1.6 km	MPC · JPL
387071	2012 TA_{85}	—	August 10, 2007	Kitt Peak	Spacewatch	·	1.6 km	MPC · JPL
387072	2012 TL_{86}	—	September 10, 2007	Mount Lemmon	Mount Lemmon Survey	KOR	1.3 km	MPC · JPL
387073	2012 TY_{87}	—	October 27, 2008	Kitt Peak	Spacewatch	·	1.3 km	MPC · JPL
387074	2012 TF_{90}	—	September 7, 2004	Kitt Peak	Spacewatch	·	970 m	MPC · JPL
387075	2012 TX_{90}	—	October 25, 2008	Mount Lemmon	Mount Lemmon Survey	·	1.4 km	MPC · JPL
387076	2012 TX_{91}	—	October 15, 2007	Mount Lemmon	Mount Lemmon Survey	KOR	1.3 km	MPC · JPL
387077	2012 TU_{92}	—	November 17, 2009	Kitt Peak	Spacewatch	·	910 m	MPC · JPL
387078	2012 TZ_{94}	—	January 21, 1996	Kitt Peak	Spacewatch	·	1.9 km	MPC · JPL
387079	2012 TM_{95}	—	September 4, 2008	Kitt Peak	Spacewatch	V	1.0 km	MPC · JPL
387080	2012 TA_{96}	—	September 11, 2007	Kitt Peak	Spacewatch	·	1.9 km	MPC · JPL
387081	2012 TD_{96}	—	October 21, 2003	Kitt Peak	Spacewatch	·	1.8 km	MPC · JPL
387082	2012 TJ_{97}	—	September 20, 2001	Kitt Peak	Spacewatch	·	2.3 km	MPC · JPL
387083	2012 TL_{97}	—	October 1, 2003	Kitt Peak	Spacewatch	·	2.2 km	MPC · JPL
387084	2012 TJ_{98}	—	November 19, 2003	Kitt Peak	Spacewatch	·	2.0 km	MPC · JPL
387085	2012 TN_{99}	—	September 17, 2006	Anderson Mesa	LONEOS	(895)	4.4 km	MPC · JPL
387086	2012 TP_{101}	—	October 23, 2003	Kitt Peak	Spacewatch	·	2.0 km	MPC · JPL
387087	2012 TL_{103}	—	January 19, 2005	Kitt Peak	Spacewatch	·	1.7 km	MPC · JPL
387088	2012 TB_{105}	—	March 9, 2005	Mount Lemmon	Mount Lemmon Survey	AGN	1.3 km	MPC · JPL
387089	2012 TF_{108}	—	October 19, 2003	Kitt Peak	Spacewatch	·	2.9 km	MPC · JPL
387090	2012 TZ_{109}	—	September 23, 1995	Kitt Peak	Spacewatch	·	3.5 km	MPC · JPL
387091	2012 TS_{110}	—	May 1, 2006	Kitt Peak	Spacewatch	·	2.0 km	MPC · JPL
387092	2012 TW_{115}	—	November 1, 2008	Mount Lemmon	Mount Lemmon Survey	·	1.9 km	MPC · JPL
387093	2012 TR_{123}	—	February 14, 2005	Kitt Peak	Spacewatch	·	2.7 km	MPC · JPL
387094	2012 TF_{126}	—	December 20, 2004	Mount Lemmon	Mount Lemmon Survey	·	1.9 km	MPC · JPL
387095	2012 TZ_{126}	—	December 16, 2004	Anderson Mesa	LONEOS	·	1.7 km	MPC · JPL
387096	2012 TE_{127}	—	September 17, 2003	Kitt Peak	Spacewatch	·	1.7 km	MPC · JPL
387097	2012 TH_{128}	—	June 15, 2007	Kitt Peak	Spacewatch	WIT	1.3 km	MPC · JPL
387098	2012 TX_{128}	—	November 15, 2003	Kitt Peak	Spacewatch	·	2.0 km	MPC · JPL
387099	2012 TM_{131}	—	August 29, 2006	Kitt Peak	Spacewatch	·	3.5 km	MPC · JPL
387100	2012 TN_{133}	—	March 15, 2004	Socorro	LINEAR	NYS	1.3 km	MPC · JPL

== 387101–387200 ==
back to top

Designation			Discovery			Properties		Ref
Permanent	Provisional	Named after	Date	Site	Discoverer(s)	Category	Diam.	Ref
387101	2012 TE_{134}	—	April 22, 2007	Kitt Peak	Spacewatch	·	980 m	MPC · JPL
387102	2012 TR_{135}	—	September 12, 2007	Kitt Peak	Spacewatch	·	1.7 km	MPC · JPL
387103	2012 TS_{138}	—	September 19, 2003	Kitt Peak	Spacewatch	·	1.9 km	MPC · JPL
387104	2012 TW_{138}	—	September 19, 2001	Socorro	LINEAR	·	4.8 km	MPC · JPL
387105	2012 TQ_{142}	—	August 17, 1999	Kitt Peak	Spacewatch	·	1.8 km	MPC · JPL
387106	2012 TW_{143}	—	September 7, 2004	Kitt Peak	Spacewatch	NYS	1.2 km	MPC · JPL
387107	2012 TC_{150}	—	August 23, 2007	Kitt Peak	Spacewatch	·	2.2 km	MPC · JPL
387108	2012 TE_{150}	—	September 28, 2006	Kitt Peak	Spacewatch	·	2.6 km	MPC · JPL
387109	2012 TM_{151}	—	September 5, 1996	Kitt Peak	Spacewatch	·	1.7 km	MPC · JPL
387110	2012 TW_{152}	—	September 10, 2007	Kitt Peak	Spacewatch	·	1.6 km	MPC · JPL
387111	2012 TT_{153}	—	November 23, 2008	Kitt Peak	Spacewatch	·	1.7 km	MPC · JPL
387112	2012 TW_{153}	—	March 9, 2005	Mount Lemmon	Mount Lemmon Survey	AGN	1.3 km	MPC · JPL
387113	2012 TP_{155}	—	April 9, 2005	Mount Lemmon	Mount Lemmon Survey	KOR	1.4 km	MPC · JPL
387114	2012 TB_{161}	—	November 1, 2008	Mount Lemmon	Mount Lemmon Survey	·	1.5 km	MPC · JPL
387115	2012 TF_{166}	—	May 4, 2006	Kitt Peak	Spacewatch	GEF	1.5 km	MPC · JPL
387116	2012 TF_{167}	—	December 19, 2004	Mount Lemmon	Mount Lemmon Survey	·	1.5 km	MPC · JPL
387117	2012 TF_{168}	—	August 19, 2006	Kitt Peak	Spacewatch	·	2.9 km	MPC · JPL
387118	2012 TN_{168}	—	November 8, 2008	Mount Lemmon	Mount Lemmon Survey	·	2.6 km	MPC · JPL
387119	2012 TO_{168}	—	February 6, 1997	Kitt Peak	Spacewatch	·	980 m	MPC · JPL
387120	2012 TB_{169}	—	September 18, 2006	Catalina	CSS	·	2.8 km	MPC · JPL
387121	2012 TN_{175}	—	February 3, 2000	Kitt Peak	Spacewatch	KOR	1.5 km	MPC · JPL
387122	2012 TG_{179}	—	September 10, 2004	Socorro	LINEAR	·	2.1 km	MPC · JPL
387123	2012 TK_{183}	—	April 13, 2004	Kitt Peak	Spacewatch	HYG	2.5 km	MPC · JPL
387124	2012 TC_{184}	—	April 6, 2005	Kitt Peak	Spacewatch	·	2.8 km	MPC · JPL
387125	2012 TK_{184}	—	October 27, 2003	Kitt Peak	Spacewatch	·	2.1 km	MPC · JPL
387126	2012 TQ_{184}	—	November 8, 2007	Mount Lemmon	Mount Lemmon Survey	(1298)	1.9 km	MPC · JPL
387127	2012 TQ_{186}	—	November 14, 2007	Kitt Peak	Spacewatch	·	1.9 km	MPC · JPL
387128	2012 TA_{190}	—	December 11, 2001	Socorro	LINEAR	VER	3.5 km	MPC · JPL
387129	2012 TF_{190}	—	September 27, 2003	Kitt Peak	Spacewatch	·	1.8 km	MPC · JPL
387130	2012 TT_{190}	—	January 16, 2009	Mount Lemmon	Mount Lemmon Survey	AGN	1.3 km	MPC · JPL
387131	2012 TX_{191}	—	July 31, 2008	Kitt Peak	Spacewatch	·	1.5 km	MPC · JPL
387132	2012 TB_{194}	—	December 5, 2005	Kitt Peak	Spacewatch	MAS	970 m	MPC · JPL
387133	2012 TV_{194}	—	November 19, 2007	Kitt Peak	Spacewatch	·	2.4 km	MPC · JPL
387134	2012 TE_{195}	—	March 24, 2006	Mount Lemmon	Mount Lemmon Survey	·	1.2 km	MPC · JPL
387135	2012 TC_{196}	—	January 8, 2006	Mount Lemmon	Mount Lemmon Survey	V	1.1 km	MPC · JPL
387136	2012 TF_{198}	—	October 2, 2003	Kitt Peak	Spacewatch	·	1.8 km	MPC · JPL
387137	2012 TB_{199}	—	April 12, 2004	Kitt Peak	Spacewatch	·	910 m	MPC · JPL
387138	2012 TM_{199}	—	October 9, 2007	Mount Lemmon	Mount Lemmon Survey	·	1.6 km	MPC · JPL
387139	2012 TS_{199}	—	November 20, 2003	Kitt Peak	Spacewatch	·	2.1 km	MPC · JPL
387140	2012 TZ_{199}	—	November 20, 2001	Socorro	LINEAR	VER	3.1 km	MPC · JPL
387141	2012 TD_{201}	—	October 22, 2003	Kitt Peak	Spacewatch	·	2.4 km	MPC · JPL
387142	2012 TJ_{205}	—	December 29, 2008	Mount Lemmon	Mount Lemmon Survey	·	2.5 km	MPC · JPL
387143	2012 TG_{207}	—	October 1, 2003	Kitt Peak	Spacewatch	·	1.9 km	MPC · JPL
387144	2012 TZ_{209}	—	February 14, 2005	Catalina	CSS	·	2.0 km	MPC · JPL
387145	2012 TD_{214}	—	April 29, 2000	Socorro	LINEAR	·	1.5 km	MPC · JPL
387146	2012 TL_{216}	—	November 10, 2004	Kitt Peak	Spacewatch	·	1.6 km	MPC · JPL
387147	2012 TP_{220}	—	September 10, 2007	Kitt Peak	Spacewatch	·	2.4 km	MPC · JPL
387148	2012 TK_{223}	—	November 8, 2008	Mount Lemmon	Mount Lemmon Survey	·	1.6 km	MPC · JPL
387149	2012 TV_{225}	—	November 8, 2008	Kitt Peak	Spacewatch	·	1.4 km	MPC · JPL
387150	2012 TA_{232}	—	April 21, 2003	Kitt Peak	Spacewatch	·	1.8 km	MPC · JPL
387151	2012 TS_{232}	—	October 16, 2003	Anderson Mesa	LONEOS	·	2.5 km	MPC · JPL
387152	2012 TF_{233}	—	November 2, 2008	Mount Lemmon	Mount Lemmon Survey	·	1.7 km	MPC · JPL
387153	2012 TP_{233}	—	January 23, 2006	Kitt Peak	Spacewatch	·	980 m	MPC · JPL
387154	2012 TS_{234}	—	December 19, 2004	Mount Lemmon	Mount Lemmon Survey	·	1.8 km	MPC · JPL
387155	2012 TK_{235}	—	January 16, 2005	Kitt Peak	Spacewatch	·	2.0 km	MPC · JPL
387156	2012 TR_{240}	—	December 1, 2005	Kitt Peak	Spacewatch	NYS	1.2 km	MPC · JPL
387157	2012 TS_{240}	—	October 20, 2003	Kitt Peak	Spacewatch	·	2.1 km	MPC · JPL
387158	2012 TB_{242}	—	February 4, 2005	Kitt Peak	Spacewatch	AST	2.4 km	MPC · JPL
387159	2012 TJ_{242}	—	September 21, 2008	Kitt Peak	Spacewatch	·	1.0 km	MPC · JPL
387160	2012 TX_{242}	—	March 8, 2005	Mount Lemmon	Mount Lemmon Survey	·	1.8 km	MPC · JPL
387161	2012 TY_{243}	—	November 20, 2001	Socorro	LINEAR	HYG	2.5 km	MPC · JPL
387162	2012 TN_{244}	—	February 25, 2007	Mount Lemmon	Mount Lemmon Survey	V	800 m	MPC · JPL
387163	2012 TE_{245}	—	September 14, 2012	Catalina	CSS	·	2.3 km	MPC · JPL
387164	2012 TR_{245}	—	March 27, 2004	Kitt Peak	Spacewatch	·	2.8 km	MPC · JPL
387165	2012 TN_{247}	—	September 15, 2006	Kitt Peak	Spacewatch	·	3.1 km	MPC · JPL
387166	2012 TZ_{249}	—	January 27, 2000	Kitt Peak	Spacewatch	DOR	3.5 km	MPC · JPL
387167	2012 TD_{251}	—	November 19, 2007	Kitt Peak	Spacewatch	LIX	4.1 km	MPC · JPL
387168	2012 TL_{254}	—	February 3, 2009	Mount Lemmon	Mount Lemmon Survey	EOS	2.0 km	MPC · JPL
387169	2012 TO_{255}	—	October 22, 2008	Kitt Peak	Spacewatch	·	2.4 km	MPC · JPL
387170	2012 TW_{256}	—	October 30, 2005	Mount Lemmon	Mount Lemmon Survey	·	1.1 km	MPC · JPL
387171	2012 TZ_{256}	—	May 15, 2004	Socorro	LINEAR	·	1.0 km	MPC · JPL
387172	2012 TE_{257}	—	February 15, 2010	WISE	WISE	·	2.8 km	MPC · JPL
387173	2012 TG_{257}	—	January 30, 2009	Kitt Peak	Spacewatch	·	3.2 km	MPC · JPL
387174	2012 TU_{257}	—	December 20, 2007	Kitt Peak	Spacewatch	·	3.1 km	MPC · JPL
387175	2012 TV_{259}	—	February 8, 2010	Kitt Peak	Spacewatch	·	2.2 km	MPC · JPL
387176	2012 TX_{260}	—	December 30, 2000	Kitt Peak	Spacewatch	(5)	1.7 km	MPC · JPL
387177	2012 TY_{262}	—	December 21, 2008	Mount Lemmon	Mount Lemmon Survey	·	1.7 km	MPC · JPL
387178	2012 TJ_{264}	—	October 15, 2007	Kitt Peak	Spacewatch	·	2.2 km	MPC · JPL
387179	2012 TU_{264}	—	March 9, 2005	Mount Lemmon	Mount Lemmon Survey	MRX	1.1 km	MPC · JPL
387180	2012 TD_{267}	—	September 13, 2007	Mount Lemmon	Mount Lemmon Survey	KOR	1.3 km	MPC · JPL
387181	2012 TJ_{272}	—	September 27, 2003	Kitt Peak	Spacewatch	·	1.5 km	MPC · JPL
387182	2012 TH_{274}	—	March 13, 2007	Kitt Peak	Spacewatch	·	1.3 km	MPC · JPL
387183	2012 TJ_{274}	—	March 3, 2005	Kitt Peak	Spacewatch	·	2.4 km	MPC · JPL
387184	2012 TN_{275}	—	February 19, 2009	Kitt Peak	Spacewatch	·	3.0 km	MPC · JPL
387185	2012 TD_{278}	—	August 28, 2006	Kitt Peak	Spacewatch	·	2.9 km	MPC · JPL
387186	2012 TD_{281}	—	September 10, 2007	Kitt Peak	Spacewatch	AGN	1.1 km	MPC · JPL
387187	2012 TD_{285}	—	September 14, 2007	Kitt Peak	Spacewatch	KOR	1.6 km	MPC · JPL
387188	2012 TJ_{285}	—	November 19, 2007	Mount Lemmon	Mount Lemmon Survey	·	2.6 km	MPC · JPL
387189	2012 TV_{285}	—	March 1, 2009	Kitt Peak	Spacewatch	·	2.8 km	MPC · JPL
387190	2012 TF_{286}	—	May 31, 1997	Kitt Peak	Spacewatch	·	1.1 km	MPC · JPL
387191	2012 TK_{286}	—	September 26, 1995	Kitt Peak	Spacewatch	THM	2.1 km	MPC · JPL
387192	2012 TR_{286}	—	December 1, 2003	Kitt Peak	Spacewatch	AGN	1.3 km	MPC · JPL
387193	2012 TA_{290}	—	September 12, 2007	Anderson Mesa	LONEOS	·	2.5 km	MPC · JPL
387194	2012 TB_{295}	—	November 17, 2001	Socorro	LINEAR	URS	4.0 km	MPC · JPL
387195	2012 TA_{298}	—	November 7, 2008	Mount Lemmon	Mount Lemmon Survey	·	2.2 km	MPC · JPL
387196	2012 TC_{303}	—	December 19, 2007	Mount Lemmon	Mount Lemmon Survey	·	2.6 km	MPC · JPL
387197	2012 TK_{303}	—	November 17, 1995	Kitt Peak	Spacewatch	URS	3.9 km	MPC · JPL
387198	2012 TJ_{304}	—	December 14, 2001	Socorro	LINEAR	THM	2.5 km	MPC · JPL
387199	2012 TF_{305}	—	February 3, 2009	Mount Lemmon	Mount Lemmon Survey	TEL	1.7 km	MPC · JPL
387200	2012 TJ_{306}	—	November 8, 2008	Mount Lemmon	Mount Lemmon Survey	·	2.2 km	MPC · JPL

== 387201–387300 ==
back to top

Designation			Discovery			Properties		Ref
Permanent	Provisional	Named after	Date	Site	Discoverer(s)	Category	Diam.	Ref
387201	2012 TL_{307}	—	October 14, 2001	Kitt Peak	Spacewatch	·	3.5 km	MPC · JPL
387202	2012 TV_{307}	—	August 19, 2006	Kitt Peak	Spacewatch	EMA	3.2 km	MPC · JPL
387203	2012 TP_{309}	—	March 3, 2005	Catalina	CSS	·	2.2 km	MPC · JPL
387204	2012 TO_{311}	—	October 10, 2005	Anderson Mesa	LONEOS	V	790 m	MPC · JPL
387205	2012 TX_{311}	—	April 25, 2007	Mount Lemmon	Mount Lemmon Survey	(5)	1.5 km	MPC · JPL
387206	2012 TM_{313}	—	October 19, 2007	Catalina	CSS	·	2.6 km	MPC · JPL
387207	2012 TP_{313}	—	March 29, 2001	Kitt Peak	Spacewatch	·	2.1 km	MPC · JPL
387208	2012 TV_{313}	—	October 1, 2003	Anderson Mesa	LONEOS	·	2.9 km	MPC · JPL
387209	2012 TR_{317}	—	October 4, 2007	Catalina	CSS	·	2.8 km	MPC · JPL
387210	2012 TU_{317}	—	September 19, 1995	Kitt Peak	Spacewatch	·	3.8 km	MPC · JPL
387211	2012 TV_{317}	—	August 21, 2006	Kitt Peak	Spacewatch	·	3.5 km	MPC · JPL
387212	2012 TX_{317}	—	September 19, 2006	Anderson Mesa	LONEOS	·	3.7 km	MPC · JPL
387213	2012 TD_{318}	—	September 14, 2006	Catalina	CSS	·	3.4 km	MPC · JPL
387214	2012 TX_{321}	—	February 3, 1997	Kitt Peak	Spacewatch	·	3.5 km	MPC · JPL
387215	2012 UK_{1}	—	October 9, 2008	Mount Lemmon	Mount Lemmon Survey	MAS	810 m	MPC · JPL
387216	2012 UQ_{3}	—	March 10, 2007	Kitt Peak	Spacewatch	V	670 m	MPC · JPL
387217	2012 US_{3}	—	June 26, 2010	WISE	WISE	HOF	2.8 km	MPC · JPL
387218	2012 UX_{3}	—	November 30, 2003	Kitt Peak	Spacewatch	·	2.3 km	MPC · JPL
387219	2012 UD_{9}	—	October 9, 2007	Kitt Peak	Spacewatch	·	1.6 km	MPC · JPL
387220	2012 UN_{14}	—	October 24, 2005	Kitt Peak	Spacewatch	MAS	830 m	MPC · JPL
387221	2012 UU_{18}	—	October 21, 2003	Kitt Peak	Spacewatch	PAD	1.7 km	MPC · JPL
387222	2012 UO_{30}	—	September 3, 2007	Catalina	CSS	·	2.2 km	MPC · JPL
387223	2012 UQ_{30}	—	March 14, 2010	Kitt Peak	Spacewatch	·	2.2 km	MPC · JPL
387224	2012 UV_{30}	—	November 15, 2003	Kitt Peak	Spacewatch	·	2.3 km	MPC · JPL
387225	2012 UP_{31}	—	November 22, 2008	Socorro	LINEAR	·	2.3 km	MPC · JPL
387226	2012 UD_{33}	—	September 15, 2007	Mount Lemmon	Mount Lemmon Survey	·	3.5 km	MPC · JPL
387227	2012 UU_{33}	—	June 14, 2007	Kitt Peak	Spacewatch	·	1.7 km	MPC · JPL
387228	2012 UU_{35}	—	February 5, 2009	Kitt Peak	Spacewatch	·	2.3 km	MPC · JPL
387229	2012 UW_{38}	—	March 9, 2005	Mount Lemmon	Mount Lemmon Survey	·	1.9 km	MPC · JPL
387230	2012 UL_{39}	—	May 8, 2011	Catalina	CSS	·	1.6 km	MPC · JPL
387231	2012 UM_{39}	—	January 15, 2005	Kitt Peak	Spacewatch	·	1.9 km	MPC · JPL
387232	2012 UL_{40}	—	November 19, 2003	Kitt Peak	Spacewatch	·	1.8 km	MPC · JPL
387233	2012 US_{41}	—	October 14, 2001	Kitt Peak	Spacewatch	·	1.4 km	MPC · JPL
387234	2012 UX_{44}	—	May 6, 2006	Mount Lemmon	Mount Lemmon Survey	·	2.0 km	MPC · JPL
387235	2012 UJ_{45}	—	September 18, 2003	Kitt Peak	Spacewatch	·	1.7 km	MPC · JPL
387236	2012 UU_{45}	—	January 31, 2006	Kitt Peak	Spacewatch	·	1.4 km	MPC · JPL
387237	2012 UV_{45}	—	February 9, 2005	Mount Lemmon	Mount Lemmon Survey	·	1.8 km	MPC · JPL
387238	2012 UY_{47}	—	April 12, 2010	Mount Lemmon	Mount Lemmon Survey	·	2.3 km	MPC · JPL
387239	2012 UE_{48}	—	November 24, 2008	Kitt Peak	Spacewatch	HOF	2.9 km	MPC · JPL
387240	2012 UD_{51}	—	March 3, 2009	Kitt Peak	Spacewatch	·	2.5 km	MPC · JPL
387241	2012 UQ_{56}	—	September 16, 2003	Kitt Peak	Spacewatch	·	1.6 km	MPC · JPL
387242	2012 UU_{56}	—	September 15, 2007	Mount Lemmon	Mount Lemmon Survey	EOS	1.9 km	MPC · JPL
387243	2012 UK_{58}	—	August 28, 2006	Kitt Peak	Spacewatch	·	2.5 km	MPC · JPL
387244	2012 UF_{61}	—	December 3, 2007	Kitt Peak	Spacewatch	EOS	2.4 km	MPC · JPL
387245	2012 UR_{63}	—	October 26, 2008	Mount Lemmon	Mount Lemmon Survey	·	1.8 km	MPC · JPL
387246	2012 UG_{69}	—	October 21, 1995	Kitt Peak	Spacewatch	·	3.0 km	MPC · JPL
387247	2012 UN_{70}	—	September 10, 2007	Catalina	CSS	HOF	3.1 km	MPC · JPL
387248	2012 UE_{76}	—	September 13, 2007	Mount Lemmon	Mount Lemmon Survey	·	2.1 km	MPC · JPL
387249	2012 UY_{79}	—	October 22, 2005	Kitt Peak	Spacewatch	V	680 m	MPC · JPL
387250	2012 UJ_{84}	—	May 2, 1997	Kitt Peak	Spacewatch	·	5.7 km	MPC · JPL
387251	2012 UU_{87}	—	November 8, 2007	Kitt Peak	Spacewatch	EOS	2.5 km	MPC · JPL
387252	2012 UY_{87}	—	October 14, 1998	Caussols	ODAS	·	2.4 km	MPC · JPL
387253	2012 UZ_{87}	—	September 17, 2006	Kitt Peak	Spacewatch	HYG	2.9 km	MPC · JPL
387254	2012 UD_{88}	—	September 23, 2001	Kitt Peak	Spacewatch	·	2.2 km	MPC · JPL
387255	2012 UM_{95}	—	September 17, 2003	Kitt Peak	Spacewatch	·	2.1 km	MPC · JPL
387256	2012 US_{95}	—	December 12, 2004	Kitt Peak	Spacewatch	·	1.8 km	MPC · JPL
387257	2012 UJ_{96}	—	October 24, 1995	Kitt Peak	Spacewatch	·	2.7 km	MPC · JPL
387258	2012 UN_{98}	—	September 9, 2008	Mount Lemmon	Mount Lemmon Survey	V	820 m	MPC · JPL
387259	2012 UZ_{98}	—	October 24, 2003	Kitt Peak	Spacewatch	·	1.7 km	MPC · JPL
387260	2012 UM_{99}	—	September 15, 2007	Kitt Peak	Spacewatch	·	1.8 km	MPC · JPL
387261	2012 US_{100}	—	March 18, 2010	Mount Lemmon	Mount Lemmon Survey	·	1.4 km	MPC · JPL
387262	2012 UC_{102}	—	April 27, 2001	Kitt Peak	Spacewatch	GEF	1.4 km	MPC · JPL
387263	2012 UA_{104}	—	March 17, 2005	Mount Lemmon	Mount Lemmon Survey	HOF	2.4 km	MPC · JPL
387264	2012 UD_{106}	—	October 15, 1995	Kitt Peak	Spacewatch	·	1.4 km	MPC · JPL
387265	2012 UE_{106}	—	April 12, 2004	Kitt Peak	Spacewatch	EOS	2.3 km	MPC · JPL
387266	2012 UQ_{106}	—	March 1, 2009	Kitt Peak	Spacewatch	EOS	1.9 km	MPC · JPL
387267	2012 UT_{106}	—	October 8, 2012	Mount Lemmon	Mount Lemmon Survey	·	1.9 km	MPC · JPL
387268	2012 UW_{109}	—	September 29, 2008	Mount Lemmon	Mount Lemmon Survey	·	1.7 km	MPC · JPL
387269	2012 UZ_{109}	—	April 30, 2004	Kitt Peak	Spacewatch	·	1.0 km	MPC · JPL
387270	2012 UP_{111}	—	December 19, 2003	Kitt Peak	Spacewatch	KOR	1.8 km	MPC · JPL
387271	2012 UJ_{117}	—	November 19, 2003	Kitt Peak	Spacewatch	AGN	1.1 km	MPC · JPL
387272	2012 UB_{118}	—	February 13, 2007	Mount Lemmon	Mount Lemmon Survey	·	960 m	MPC · JPL
387273	2012 UD_{118}	—	August 10, 2007	Kitt Peak	Spacewatch	·	2.0 km	MPC · JPL
387274	2012 UV_{120}	—	September 15, 2006	Kitt Peak	Spacewatch	·	3.2 km	MPC · JPL
387275	2012 UF_{121}	—	July 5, 2005	Mount Lemmon	Mount Lemmon Survey	·	4.1 km	MPC · JPL
387276	2012 UV_{122}	—	October 4, 2004	Kitt Peak	Spacewatch	3:2	5.0 km	MPC · JPL
387277	2012 UN_{123}	—	October 21, 2003	Kitt Peak	Spacewatch	·	2.3 km	MPC · JPL
387278	2012 UR_{124}	—	November 18, 1995	Kitt Peak	Spacewatch	·	2.7 km	MPC · JPL
387279	2012 UW_{132}	—	September 14, 2006	Catalina	CSS	·	2.9 km	MPC · JPL
387280	2012 UH_{133}	—	January 23, 2006	Kitt Peak	Spacewatch	·	1.7 km	MPC · JPL
387281	2012 UX_{139}	—	January 30, 2009	Mount Lemmon	Mount Lemmon Survey	EOS	1.8 km	MPC · JPL
387282	2012 UU_{140}	—	February 2, 2006	Mount Lemmon	Mount Lemmon Survey	·	1.2 km	MPC · JPL
387283	2012 UM_{151}	—	September 26, 2006	Mount Lemmon	Mount Lemmon Survey	·	2.2 km	MPC · JPL
387284	2012 UY_{151}	—	January 4, 2000	Kitt Peak	Spacewatch	·	2.1 km	MPC · JPL
387285	2012 UB_{153}	—	December 3, 2007	Kitt Peak	Spacewatch	·	2.6 km	MPC · JPL
387286	2012 UX_{153}	—	November 14, 2007	Mount Lemmon	Mount Lemmon Survey	·	3.3 km	MPC · JPL
387287	2012 UM_{159}	—	October 25, 2003	Kitt Peak	Spacewatch	·	2.0 km	MPC · JPL
387288	2012 US_{160}	—	March 4, 2005	Mount Lemmon	Mount Lemmon Survey	HOF	2.9 km	MPC · JPL
387289	2012 UP_{162}	—	November 8, 1996	Kitt Peak	Spacewatch	·	1.3 km	MPC · JPL
387290	2012 UR_{166}	—	November 6, 2005	Socorro	LINEAR	·	1.2 km	MPC · JPL
387291	2012 UT_{167}	—	February 17, 2010	Catalina	CSS	·	1.9 km	MPC · JPL
387292	2012 UY_{167}	—	September 29, 2003	Anderson Mesa	LONEOS	·	2.1 km	MPC · JPL
387293	2012 UY_{171}	—	September 15, 2004	Kitt Peak	Spacewatch	·	1.4 km	MPC · JPL
387294	2012 UL_{175}	—	November 3, 2007	Mount Lemmon	Mount Lemmon Survey	·	2.6 km	MPC · JPL
387295	2012 UG_{176}	—	March 16, 2007	Mount Lemmon	Mount Lemmon Survey	V	710 m	MPC · JPL
387296	2012 VX_{2}	—	April 11, 2010	Mount Lemmon	Mount Lemmon Survey	EOS	2.1 km	MPC · JPL
387297	2012 VY_{3}	—	September 4, 2007	Catalina	CSS	·	2.2 km	MPC · JPL
387298	2012 VC_{4}	—	October 27, 2008	Mount Lemmon	Mount Lemmon Survey	·	2.1 km	MPC · JPL
387299	2012 VX_{7}	—	March 11, 2005	Mount Lemmon	Mount Lemmon Survey	AGN	1.3 km	MPC · JPL
387300	2012 VH_{8}	—	September 13, 2007	Mount Lemmon	Mount Lemmon Survey	AGN	1.2 km	MPC · JPL

== 387301–387400 ==
back to top

Designation			Discovery			Properties		Ref
Permanent	Provisional	Named after	Date	Site	Discoverer(s)	Category	Diam.	Ref
387301	2012 VW_{15}	—	December 18, 2001	Socorro	LINEAR	·	4.0 km	MPC · JPL
387302	2012 VK_{20}	—	March 23, 2004	Socorro	LINEAR	·	2.8 km	MPC · JPL
387303	2012 VP_{28}	—	October 17, 2003	Kitt Peak	Spacewatch	NEM	2.0 km	MPC · JPL
387304	2012 VF_{34}	—	March 20, 2010	Mount Lemmon	Mount Lemmon Survey	·	1.6 km	MPC · JPL
387305	2012 VS_{37}	—	August 28, 2006	Catalina	CSS	THM	2.8 km	MPC · JPL
387306	2012 VX_{40}	—	August 29, 2006	Kitt Peak	Spacewatch	·	2.6 km	MPC · JPL
387307	2012 VG_{47}	—	September 15, 2007	Mount Lemmon	Mount Lemmon Survey	EOS	2.4 km	MPC · JPL
387308	2012 VK_{52}	—	January 12, 1996	Kitt Peak	Spacewatch	·	1.6 km	MPC · JPL
387309	2012 VG_{57}	—	May 7, 2005	Mount Lemmon	Mount Lemmon Survey	EOS	1.8 km	MPC · JPL
387310	2012 VO_{57}	—	February 2, 2005	Kitt Peak	Spacewatch	·	1.6 km	MPC · JPL
387311	2012 VV_{57}	—	March 11, 1996	Kitt Peak	Spacewatch	·	1.9 km	MPC · JPL
387312	2012 VD_{58}	—	October 16, 2006	Catalina	CSS	·	4.4 km	MPC · JPL
387313	2012 VC_{61}	—	November 21, 2003	Socorro	LINEAR	·	2.7 km	MPC · JPL
387314	2012 VY_{61}	—	April 2, 2005	Kitt Peak	Spacewatch	·	2.2 km	MPC · JPL
387315	2012 VB_{62}	—	May 12, 2011	Mount Lemmon	Mount Lemmon Survey	MIS	2.8 km	MPC · JPL
387316	2012 VG_{67}	—	April 7, 2010	Kitt Peak	Spacewatch	·	1.4 km	MPC · JPL
387317	2012 VM_{68}	—	September 15, 1998	Kitt Peak	Spacewatch	·	1.5 km	MPC · JPL
387318	2012 VH_{69}	—	October 13, 2007	Mount Lemmon	Mount Lemmon Survey	·	2.3 km	MPC · JPL
387319	2012 VX_{71}	—	November 11, 2007	Mount Lemmon	Mount Lemmon Survey	THM	2.2 km	MPC · JPL
387320	2012 VG_{72}	—	February 22, 2009	Kitt Peak	Spacewatch	·	2.9 km	MPC · JPL
387321	2012 VQ_{72}	—	March 1, 2009	Kitt Peak	Spacewatch	·	2.3 km	MPC · JPL
387322	2012 VH_{73}	—	October 15, 2007	Mount Lemmon	Mount Lemmon Survey	·	2.5 km	MPC · JPL
387323	2012 VG_{74}	—	April 6, 2005	Mount Lemmon	Mount Lemmon Survey	KOR	1.7 km	MPC · JPL
387324	2012 VT_{74}	—	December 4, 2007	Kitt Peak	Spacewatch	·	3.8 km	MPC · JPL
387325	2012 VA_{79}	—	October 15, 2007	Catalina	CSS	·	4.1 km	MPC · JPL
387326	2012 VJ_{79}	—	October 27, 2005	Mount Lemmon	Mount Lemmon Survey	NYS	1.1 km	MPC · JPL
387327	2012 VB_{81}	—	February 9, 2002	Kitt Peak	Spacewatch	·	2.6 km	MPC · JPL
387328	2012 VU_{82}	—	October 4, 2006	Mount Lemmon	Mount Lemmon Survey	·	3.3 km	MPC · JPL
387329	2012 VS_{84}	—	October 21, 2001	Socorro	LINEAR	·	3.3 km	MPC · JPL
387330	2012 VO_{89}	—	November 6, 2007	Kitt Peak	Spacewatch	EOS	2.3 km	MPC · JPL
387331	2012 VV_{89}	—	September 27, 2006	Kitt Peak	Spacewatch	·	2.7 km	MPC · JPL
387332	2012 VA_{92}	—	December 5, 2007	Kitt Peak	Spacewatch	·	3.6 km	MPC · JPL
387333	2012 VK_{96}	—	October 12, 1998	Kitt Peak	Spacewatch	AST	1.8 km	MPC · JPL
387334	2012 VL_{97}	—	December 10, 2005	Kitt Peak	Spacewatch	·	1.1 km	MPC · JPL
387335	2012 VY_{98}	—	November 23, 2008	Kitt Peak	Spacewatch	·	2.3 km	MPC · JPL
387336	2012 VY_{100}	—	November 17, 2007	Kitt Peak	Spacewatch	·	3.1 km	MPC · JPL
387337	2012 VG_{103}	—	October 21, 2006	Mount Lemmon	Mount Lemmon Survey	·	3.8 km	MPC · JPL
387338	2012 VN_{105}	—	November 8, 2008	Mount Lemmon	Mount Lemmon Survey	MAR	1.5 km	MPC · JPL
387339	2012 VS_{108}	—	September 15, 2006	Kitt Peak	Spacewatch	·	2.8 km	MPC · JPL
387340	2012 WV_{5}	—	October 24, 2008	Mount Lemmon	Mount Lemmon Survey	V	900 m	MPC · JPL
387341	2012 WO_{6}	—	November 17, 2004	Campo Imperatore	CINEOS	3:2 · SHU	4.4 km	MPC · JPL
387342	2012 WX_{7}	—	July 10, 2005	Kitt Peak	Spacewatch	·	3.5 km	MPC · JPL
387343	2012 WU_{10}	—	April 19, 2004	Kitt Peak	Spacewatch	·	2.9 km	MPC · JPL
387344	2012 WB_{11}	—	March 26, 1995	Kitt Peak	Spacewatch	·	2.4 km	MPC · JPL
387345	2012 WG_{11}	—	February 2, 2005	Kitt Peak	Spacewatch	·	1.5 km	MPC · JPL
387346	2012 WX_{12}	—	February 24, 2009	Mount Lemmon	Mount Lemmon Survey	·	2.9 km	MPC · JPL
387347	2012 WH_{13}	—	May 26, 2007	Mount Lemmon	Mount Lemmon Survey	NYS	1.3 km	MPC · JPL
387348	2012 WY_{20}	—	March 13, 2005	Kitt Peak	Spacewatch	·	2.0 km	MPC · JPL
387349	2012 WA_{32}	—	June 11, 2004	Kitt Peak	Spacewatch	VER	3.2 km	MPC · JPL
387350	2012 WD_{32}	—	August 21, 2006	Kitt Peak	Spacewatch	·	2.2 km	MPC · JPL
387351	2012 XD_{2}	—	November 4, 2004	Anderson Mesa	LONEOS	T_{j} (2.98) · HIL · 3:2	6.1 km	MPC · JPL
387352	2012 XR_{4}	—	January 16, 2009	Mount Lemmon	Mount Lemmon Survey	MRX	1.4 km	MPC · JPL
387353	2012 XV_{11}	—	November 20, 2006	Kitt Peak	Spacewatch	(260) · CYB	3.3 km	MPC · JPL
387354	2012 XY_{20}	—	October 20, 2006	Kitt Peak	Spacewatch	EOS	1.9 km	MPC · JPL
387355	2012 XN_{21}	—	October 21, 2001	Kitt Peak	Spacewatch	·	2.5 km	MPC · JPL
387356	2012 XT_{22}	—	October 29, 2003	Kitt Peak	Spacewatch	EUN	1.7 km	MPC · JPL
387357	2012 XR_{24}	—	December 4, 2007	Mount Lemmon	Mount Lemmon Survey	·	1.8 km	MPC · JPL
387358	2012 XK_{26}	—	December 14, 2001	Socorro	LINEAR	·	3.7 km	MPC · JPL
387359	2012 XZ_{37}	—	March 19, 2009	Kitt Peak	Spacewatch	·	3.1 km	MPC · JPL
387360	2012 XS_{38}	—	August 27, 2006	Kitt Peak	Spacewatch	·	1.6 km	MPC · JPL
387361	2012 XO_{53}	—	August 29, 2006	Catalina	CSS	·	2.8 km	MPC · JPL
387362	2012 XZ_{62}	—	January 20, 2009	Mount Lemmon	Mount Lemmon Survey	·	2.3 km	MPC · JPL
387363	2012 XE_{63}	—	October 20, 2007	Mount Lemmon	Mount Lemmon Survey	·	2.1 km	MPC · JPL
387364	2012 XG_{64}	—	November 2, 2007	Mount Lemmon	Mount Lemmon Survey	·	2.2 km	MPC · JPL
387365	2012 XK_{64}	—	September 25, 2006	Catalina	CSS	·	3.8 km	MPC · JPL
387366	2012 XG_{68}	—	February 1, 2006	Kitt Peak	Spacewatch	·	1.6 km	MPC · JPL
387367	2012 XK_{84}	—	December 20, 2004	Mount Lemmon	Mount Lemmon Survey	MAR	1.7 km	MPC · JPL
387368	2012 XL_{84}	—	August 21, 2006	Kitt Peak	Spacewatch	·	2.0 km	MPC · JPL
387369	2012 XC_{94}	—	October 19, 2007	Catalina	CSS	·	2.6 km	MPC · JPL
387370	2012 XC_{100}	—	December 18, 2001	Socorro	LINEAR	·	3.5 km	MPC · JPL
387371	2012 XP_{110}	—	May 29, 2000	Kitt Peak	Spacewatch	V	980 m	MPC · JPL
387372	2012 XX_{113}	—	September 11, 2006	Catalina	CSS	·	3.1 km	MPC · JPL
387373	2012 XO_{124}	—	January 29, 1993	Kitt Peak	Spacewatch	EOS	2.8 km	MPC · JPL
387374	2012 XA_{129}	—	December 21, 2008	Mount Lemmon	Mount Lemmon Survey	·	2.0 km	MPC · JPL
387375	2012 XJ_{131}	—	March 2, 2006	Mount Lemmon	Mount Lemmon Survey	·	1.6 km	MPC · JPL
387376	2012 XB_{137}	—	November 12, 2007	Mount Lemmon	Mount Lemmon Survey	·	4.5 km	MPC · JPL
387377	2012 XY_{143}	—	April 21, 2006	Kitt Peak	Spacewatch	·	1.9 km	MPC · JPL
387378	2012 XP_{149}	—	June 11, 2010	Mount Lemmon	Mount Lemmon Survey	·	3.1 km	MPC · JPL
387379	2012 XE_{153}	—	April 25, 2006	Kitt Peak	Spacewatch	·	3.6 km	MPC · JPL
387380	2012 XE_{155}	—	November 25, 1997	Kitt Peak	Spacewatch	KOR	1.9 km	MPC · JPL
387381	2013 AJ_{8}	—	September 21, 2009	Kitt Peak	Spacewatch	L4	9.8 km	MPC · JPL
387382	2013 AB_{41}	—	February 12, 2002	Kitt Peak	Spacewatch	L4	10 km	MPC · JPL
387383	2013 AQ_{41}	—	September 20, 2009	Kitt Peak	Spacewatch	L4	7.5 km	MPC · JPL
387384	2013 AW_{57}	—	March 23, 2002	Kitt Peak	Spacewatch	L4	10 km	MPC · JPL
387385	2013 AX_{98}	—	December 31, 2000	Kitt Peak	Spacewatch	L4	10 km	MPC · JPL
387386	2013 AZ_{107}	—	July 29, 2008	Kitt Peak	Spacewatch	L4	8.4 km	MPC · JPL
387387	2013 AY_{125}	—	December 7, 1999	Socorro	LINEAR	·	2.1 km	MPC · JPL
387388	2013 AQ_{130}	—	October 15, 2009	Catalina	CSS	L4	10 km	MPC · JPL
387389	2013 AV_{130}	—	June 18, 2006	Kitt Peak	Spacewatch	L4	10 km	MPC · JPL
387390	2013 AG_{133}	—	November 6, 2010	Mount Lemmon	Mount Lemmon Survey	L4 · (8060)	9.3 km	MPC · JPL
387391	2013 AZ_{156}	—	May 13, 2005	Kitt Peak	Spacewatch	L4	9.5 km	MPC · JPL
387392	2013 BB	—	October 17, 2010	Mount Lemmon	Mount Lemmon Survey	L4	7.8 km	MPC · JPL
387393	2013 BF_{71}	—	March 27, 2003	Kitt Peak	Spacewatch	L4	10 km	MPC · JPL
387394	2013 BX_{78}	—	February 6, 2006	Mount Lemmon	Mount Lemmon Survey	V	690 m	MPC · JPL
387395	2013 CC_{202}	—	January 26, 2006	Mount Lemmon	Mount Lemmon Survey	·	690 m	MPC · JPL
387396	2013 GX_{42}	—	September 17, 2010	Mount Lemmon	Mount Lemmon Survey	ELF	3.9 km	MPC · JPL
387397	2013 NZ_{18}	—	November 13, 2006	Catalina	CSS	V	800 m	MPC · JPL
387398	2013 NP_{22}	—	June 14, 2007	Kitt Peak	Spacewatch	615	1.7 km	MPC · JPL
387399	2013 PR_{10}	—	October 29, 2005	Catalina	CSS	·	1.7 km	MPC · JPL
387400	2013 QZ_{2}	—	October 5, 2005	Catalina	CSS	·	1.2 km	MPC · JPL

== 387401–387500 ==
back to top

Designation			Discovery			Properties		Ref
Permanent	Provisional	Named after	Date	Site	Discoverer(s)	Category	Diam.	Ref
387401	2013 QC_{48}	—	August 31, 1998	Kitt Peak	Spacewatch	·	1.4 km	MPC · JPL
387402	2013 RU_{32}	—	February 9, 2002	Kitt Peak	Spacewatch	·	2.2 km	MPC · JPL
387403	2013 RQ_{44}	—	January 23, 2006	Kitt Peak	Spacewatch	·	2.3 km	MPC · JPL
387404	2013 RU_{85}	—	October 3, 2003	Kitt Peak	Spacewatch	·	890 m	MPC · JPL
387405	2013 SJ_{25}	—	September 21, 2009	Catalina	CSS	PHO	1.3 km	MPC · JPL
387406	2013 SH_{33}	—	September 24, 2004	Socorro	LINEAR	·	2.3 km	MPC · JPL
387407	2013 SP_{52}	—	October 21, 2008	Kitt Peak	Spacewatch	URS	6.1 km	MPC · JPL
387408	2013 SH_{62}	—	January 10, 2007	Kitt Peak	Spacewatch	NYS	1.5 km	MPC · JPL
387409	2013 TM_{3}	—	January 25, 2006	Kitt Peak	Spacewatch	·	2.4 km	MPC · JPL
387410	2013 TE_{12}	—	October 9, 2004	Kitt Peak	Spacewatch	·	1.8 km	MPC · JPL
387411	2013 TN_{18}	—	October 7, 2004	Kitt Peak	Spacewatch	·	2.5 km	MPC · JPL
387412	2013 TU_{39}	—	October 6, 2004	Kitt Peak	Spacewatch	·	2.4 km	MPC · JPL
387413	2013 TA_{41}	—	February 27, 2000	Kitt Peak	Spacewatch	MAS	720 m	MPC · JPL
387414	2013 TB_{123}	—	April 21, 2006	Kitt Peak	Spacewatch	·	3.5 km	MPC · JPL
387415	2013 TY_{131}	—	November 30, 2008	Kitt Peak	Spacewatch	THM	2.7 km	MPC · JPL
387416	2013 TR_{138}	—	September 9, 2007	Mount Lemmon	Mount Lemmon Survey	·	2.5 km	MPC · JPL
387417	2013 TQ_{139}	—	November 3, 2004	Kitt Peak	Spacewatch	·	1.9 km	MPC · JPL
387418	2013 UN_{11}	—	September 8, 2007	Anderson Mesa	LONEOS	EOS	2.5 km	MPC · JPL
387419	2013 UD_{12}	—	September 20, 2000	Socorro	LINEAR	·	2.2 km	MPC · JPL
387420	2013 UF_{12}	—	November 21, 2003	Socorro	LINEAR	·	4.2 km	MPC · JPL
387421	2013 VP_{1}	—	November 25, 2009	Mount Lemmon	Mount Lemmon Survey	·	3.5 km	MPC · JPL
387422	2013 VL_{16}	—	November 6, 2008	Mount Lemmon	Mount Lemmon Survey	TEL	1.9 km	MPC · JPL
387423	2013 VT_{16}	—	October 1, 2003	Anderson Mesa	LONEOS	·	780 m	MPC · JPL
387424	2013 VS_{17}	—	January 8, 2003	Socorro	LINEAR	·	1.3 km	MPC · JPL
387425	2013 VU_{17}	—	January 22, 2006	Anderson Mesa	LONEOS	·	1.9 km	MPC · JPL
387426	2013 VJ_{20}	—	June 29, 2004	Siding Spring	SSS	EUN	1.7 km	MPC · JPL
387427	2013 VV_{20}	—	February 11, 2002	Anderson Mesa	LONEOS	·	2.0 km	MPC · JPL
387428	2013 VD_{21}	—	September 15, 2007	Mount Lemmon	Mount Lemmon Survey	·	2.6 km	MPC · JPL
387429	2013 WR_{2}	—	October 11, 2007	Catalina	CSS	·	3.9 km	MPC · JPL
387430	2013 WD_{3}	—	June 8, 2005	Kitt Peak	Spacewatch	·	1.3 km	MPC · JPL
387431	2013 WF_{4}	—	December 8, 2005	Catalina	CSS	·	3.7 km	MPC · JPL
387432	2013 WU_{4}	—	January 24, 1998	Kitt Peak	Spacewatch	·	5.6 km	MPC · JPL
387433	2013 WP_{14}	—	October 25, 2005	Mount Lemmon	Mount Lemmon Survey	·	1.3 km	MPC · JPL
387434	2013 WS_{30}	—	September 3, 2008	Kitt Peak	Spacewatch	·	2.1 km	MPC · JPL
387435	2013 WV_{32}	—	December 5, 2008	Mount Lemmon	Mount Lemmon Survey	·	3.7 km	MPC · JPL
387436	2013 WB_{47}	—	April 3, 2008	Mount Lemmon	Mount Lemmon Survey	V	720 m	MPC · JPL
387437	2013 WO_{55}	—	January 13, 2004	Kitt Peak	Spacewatch	·	2.4 km	MPC · JPL
387438	2013 WR_{55}	—	March 2, 2006	Mount Lemmon	Mount Lemmon Survey	·	1.8 km	MPC · JPL
387439	2013 WU_{55}	—	September 16, 2004	Kitt Peak	Spacewatch	·	2.9 km	MPC · JPL
387440	2013 WQ_{57}	—	January 13, 2004	Kitt Peak	Spacewatch	·	1.7 km	MPC · JPL
387441	2013 WU_{57}	—	May 9, 2002	Socorro	LINEAR	JUN	1.4 km	MPC · JPL
387442	2013 WJ_{59}	—	March 25, 2007	Mount Lemmon	Mount Lemmon Survey	MAR	1.6 km	MPC · JPL
387443	2013 WP_{60}	—	September 12, 2007	Mount Lemmon	Mount Lemmon Survey	·	2.7 km	MPC · JPL
387444	2013 WU_{60}	—	September 19, 2009	Kitt Peak	Spacewatch	·	1.1 km	MPC · JPL
387445	2013 WV_{60}	—	January 28, 2007	Mount Lemmon	Mount Lemmon Survey	·	2.2 km	MPC · JPL
387446	2013 WP_{61}	—	December 10, 2004	Socorro	LINEAR	·	3.2 km	MPC · JPL
387447	2013 WA_{65}	—	August 30, 1998	Anderson Mesa	LONEOS	·	1.7 km	MPC · JPL
387448	2013 WZ_{65}	—	May 28, 2000	Socorro	LINEAR	·	3.4 km	MPC · JPL
387449	2013 WB_{66}	—	November 10, 2009	Mount Lemmon	Mount Lemmon Survey	·	1.7 km	MPC · JPL
387450	2013 WQ_{66}	—	March 11, 2005	Mount Lemmon	Mount Lemmon Survey	·	590 m	MPC · JPL
387451	2013 WS_{72}	—	April 4, 2005	Catalina	CSS	·	2.7 km	MPC · JPL
387452	2013 WN_{74}	—	May 23, 2003	Kitt Peak	Spacewatch	·	2.0 km	MPC · JPL
387453	2013 WX_{81}	—	August 23, 2004	Kitt Peak	Spacewatch	(5)	1.3 km	MPC · JPL
387454	2013 WS_{83}	—	September 22, 2009	Kitt Peak	Spacewatch	·	1.2 km	MPC · JPL
387455	2013 WF_{85}	—	January 14, 2010	Kitt Peak	Spacewatch	·	2.7 km	MPC · JPL
387456	2013 WY_{85}	—	September 24, 2004	Kitt Peak	Spacewatch	·	1.3 km	MPC · JPL
387457	2013 WK_{97}	—	November 2, 2008	Mount Lemmon	Mount Lemmon Survey	EOS	2.3 km	MPC · JPL
387458	2013 WQ_{103}	—	December 10, 2004	Socorro	LINEAR	·	2.3 km	MPC · JPL
387459	2013 WF_{106}	—	January 13, 2008	Kitt Peak	Spacewatch	·	910 m	MPC · JPL
387460	2013 WQ_{107}	—	October 27, 2005	Kitt Peak	Spacewatch	SYL · CYB	4.3 km	MPC · JPL
387461	2013 WM_{109}	—	December 29, 2000	Kitt Peak	Spacewatch	·	2.2 km	MPC · JPL
387462	2013 XU	—	December 10, 2004	Socorro	LINEAR	·	2.4 km	MPC · JPL
387463	2013 XH_{1}	—	April 5, 2005	Mount Lemmon	Mount Lemmon Survey	·	3.6 km	MPC · JPL
387464	2013 XV_{4}	—	October 2, 2000	Anderson Mesa	LONEOS	EUN	1.7 km	MPC · JPL
387465	2013 XX_{10}	—	September 12, 2007	Mount Lemmon	Mount Lemmon Survey	THM	1.9 km	MPC · JPL
387466	2013 XQ_{11}	—	November 1, 2000	Socorro	LINEAR	·	1.9 km	MPC · JPL
387467	2013 XE_{12}	—	October 8, 2007	Kitt Peak	Spacewatch	HYG	2.8 km	MPC · JPL
387468	2013 XL_{13}	—	November 10, 2004	Kitt Peak	Spacewatch	·	1.6 km	MPC · JPL
387469	2013 XB_{23}	—	November 6, 2008	Catalina	CSS	·	2.8 km	MPC · JPL
387470	2013 XF_{23}	—	August 30, 2005	Kitt Peak	Spacewatch	MAS	760 m	MPC · JPL
387471	2013 XL_{23}	—	December 12, 2004	Kitt Peak	Spacewatch	·	3.0 km	MPC · JPL
387472	2013 XQ_{23}	—	November 30, 2005	Kitt Peak	Spacewatch	·	1.6 km	MPC · JPL
387473	2013 XR_{23}	—	July 2, 2011	Mount Lemmon	Mount Lemmon Survey	·	3.4 km	MPC · JPL
387474	2013 YP_{4}	—	February 9, 2007	Kitt Peak	Spacewatch	MAS	750 m	MPC · JPL
387475	2013 YF_{10}	—	January 23, 2006	Catalina	CSS	·	1.8 km	MPC · JPL
387476	2013 YS_{10}	—	November 15, 2006	Mount Lemmon	Mount Lemmon Survey	·	1.1 km	MPC · JPL
387477	2013 YG_{11}	—	January 5, 2003	Socorro	LINEAR	·	3.5 km	MPC · JPL
387478	2013 YD_{12}	—	July 29, 2008	Kitt Peak	Spacewatch	·	1.4 km	MPC · JPL
387479	2013 YU_{14}	—	January 26, 2007	Kitt Peak	Spacewatch	V	650 m	MPC · JPL
387480	2013 YC_{16}	—	January 31, 2004	Kitt Peak	Spacewatch	·	700 m	MPC · JPL
387481	2013 YK_{16}	—	December 9, 2004	Kitt Peak	Spacewatch	·	2.8 km	MPC · JPL
387482	2013 YF_{18}	—	October 14, 2007	Catalina	CSS	·	4.2 km	MPC · JPL
387483	2013 YR_{52}	—	January 2, 2003	Socorro	LINEAR	·	1.9 km	MPC · JPL
387484	2013 YH_{62}	—	March 29, 2000	Socorro	LINEAR	·	1.3 km	MPC · JPL
387485	2013 YS_{102}	—	December 10, 2004	Socorro	LINEAR	BRU	5.8 km	MPC · JPL
387486	2013 YO_{106}	—	June 16, 2004	Kitt Peak	Spacewatch	·	1.1 km	MPC · JPL
387487	4169 T-3	—	October 16, 1977	Palomar	C. J. van Houten, I. van Houten-Groeneveld, T. Gehrels	·	1.0 km	MPC · JPL
387488	1994 AY_{13}	—	January 12, 1994	Kitt Peak	Spacewatch	·	1.5 km	MPC · JPL
387489	1994 TC_{7}	—	October 4, 1994	Kitt Peak	Spacewatch	·	1.6 km	MPC · JPL
387490	1995 BG_{8}	—	January 29, 1995	Kitt Peak	Spacewatch	·	2.2 km	MPC · JPL
387491	1995 QK_{5}	—	August 22, 1995	Kitt Peak	Spacewatch	·	810 m	MPC · JPL
387492	1995 SF_{26}	—	September 19, 1995	Kitt Peak	Spacewatch	·	1.7 km	MPC · JPL
387493	1995 SU_{42}	—	September 25, 1995	Kitt Peak	Spacewatch	·	3.1 km	MPC · JPL
387494	1995 SP_{58}	—	September 23, 1995	Kitt Peak	Spacewatch	·	2.5 km	MPC · JPL
387495	1995 SJ_{84}	—	September 25, 1995	Kitt Peak	Spacewatch	·	1.8 km	MPC · JPL
387496	1995 TJ_{4}	—	October 15, 1995	Kitt Peak	Spacewatch	EOS	1.7 km	MPC · JPL
387497	1995 UJ_{61}	—	October 24, 1995	Kitt Peak	Spacewatch	·	910 m	MPC · JPL
387498	1995 VV_{2}	—	November 14, 1995	Kitt Peak	Spacewatch	·	1.4 km	MPC · JPL
387499	1996 VF_{28}	—	November 11, 1996	Kitt Peak	Spacewatch	EOS	4.9 km	MPC · JPL
387500	1996 XY_{3}	—	December 4, 1996	Kitt Peak	Spacewatch	·	2.8 km	MPC · JPL

== 387501–387600 ==
back to top

Designation			Discovery			Properties		Ref
Permanent	Provisional	Named after	Date	Site	Discoverer(s)	Category	Diam.	Ref
387501	1996 XC_{17}	—	November 14, 1996	Kitt Peak	Spacewatch	CYB	4.1 km	MPC · JPL
387502	1997 CP_{22}	—	February 3, 1997	Kitt Peak	Spacewatch	·	620 m	MPC · JPL
387503	1997 SC_{6}	—	September 23, 1997	Kitt Peak	Spacewatch	EUN	1.5 km	MPC · JPL
387504	1998 DE_{7}	—	February 17, 1998	Kitt Peak	Spacewatch	·	940 m	MPC · JPL
387505	1998 KN_{3}	—	May 24, 1998	Socorro	LINEAR	APO +1km · PHA	1.1 km	MPC · JPL
387506	1998 KQ_{5}	—	May 19, 1998	Kitt Peak	Spacewatch	·	2.8 km	MPC · JPL
387507	1998 RF_{8}	—	September 12, 1998	Kitt Peak	Spacewatch	·	1.1 km	MPC · JPL
387508	1998 TD_{1}	—	October 12, 1998	Kitt Peak	Spacewatch	·	550 m	MPC · JPL
387509	1998 TC_{26}	—	October 14, 1998	Kitt Peak	Spacewatch	V	590 m	MPC · JPL
387510	1998 XW_{5}	—	November 26, 1998	Kitt Peak	Spacewatch	·	1.8 km	MPC · JPL
387511	1999 AB_{20}	—	January 13, 1999	Kitt Peak	Spacewatch	·	1.1 km	MPC · JPL
387512	1999 NR_{54}	—	July 12, 1999	Socorro	LINEAR	·	4.1 km	MPC · JPL
387513	1999 RN_{37}	—	September 11, 1999	Socorro	LINEAR	·	1.4 km	MPC · JPL
387514	1999 RM_{190}	—	September 10, 1999	Socorro	LINEAR	·	1.0 km	MPC · JPL
387515	1999 SL_{2}	—	September 18, 1999	Kitt Peak	Spacewatch	·	740 m	MPC · JPL
387516	1999 TQ_{1}	—	October 2, 1999	Catalina	CSS	(1547)	2.9 km	MPC · JPL
387517	1999 TH_{48}	—	October 4, 1999	Kitt Peak	Spacewatch	·	1.4 km	MPC · JPL
387518	1999 TV_{128}	—	October 6, 1999	Socorro	LINEAR	·	2.0 km	MPC · JPL
387519	1999 TP_{131}	—	October 6, 1999	Socorro	LINEAR	H	650 m	MPC · JPL
387520	1999 TN_{135}	—	October 6, 1999	Socorro	LINEAR	EUN	1.2 km	MPC · JPL
387521	1999 UT_{30}	—	October 31, 1999	Kitt Peak	Spacewatch	·	730 m	MPC · JPL
387522	1999 VL_{132}	—	November 9, 1999	Kitt Peak	Spacewatch	·	1.4 km	MPC · JPL
387523	1999 VH_{175}	—	November 10, 1999	Kitt Peak	Spacewatch	·	1.3 km	MPC · JPL
387524	1999 VF_{196}	—	November 4, 1999	Anderson Mesa	LONEOS	·	2.6 km	MPC · JPL
387525	1999 XA_{164}	—	December 8, 1999	Socorro	LINEAR	·	1.9 km	MPC · JPL
387526	2000 AO_{162}	—	January 4, 2000	Socorro	LINEAR	H	750 m	MPC · JPL
387527	2000 CF_{139}	—	February 2, 2000	Kitt Peak	Spacewatch	·	2.1 km	MPC · JPL
387528	2000 CF_{149}	—	February 12, 2000	Apache Point	SDSS	·	1.8 km	MPC · JPL
387529	2000 DN_{17}	—	February 29, 2000	Socorro	LINEAR	·	1.0 km	MPC · JPL
387530	2000 DZ_{72}	—	February 29, 2000	Socorro	LINEAR	·	3.0 km	MPC · JPL
387531	2000 FA_{14}	—	March 29, 2000	Kitt Peak	Spacewatch	NYS	890 m	MPC · JPL
387532	2000 FS_{14}	—	March 29, 2000	Socorro	LINEAR	PHO	1.2 km	MPC · JPL
387533	2000 FE_{74}	—	March 29, 2000	Kitt Peak	Kitt Peak	·	2.4 km	MPC · JPL
387534	2000 GX_{118}	—	April 3, 2000	Kitt Peak	Spacewatch	fast	740 m	MPC · JPL
387535	2000 QJ_{129}	—	August 31, 2000	Socorro	LINEAR	·	1.6 km	MPC · JPL
387536	2000 QP_{154}	—	August 31, 2000	Socorro	LINEAR	EUN	1.4 km	MPC · JPL
387537	2000 QG_{197}	—	August 29, 2000	Socorro	LINEAR	·	1.3 km	MPC · JPL
387538	2000 SP_{208}	—	September 25, 2000	Socorro	LINEAR	(5)	1.1 km	MPC · JPL
387539	2000 SO_{348}	—	September 20, 2000	Socorro	LINEAR	EUN	1.6 km	MPC · JPL
387540	2000 UV_{63}	—	October 25, 2000	Socorro	LINEAR	fast	1.1 km	MPC · JPL
387541	2000 VN_{61}	—	November 9, 2000	Socorro	LINEAR	·	1.8 km	MPC · JPL
387542	2000 WA_{24}	—	November 20, 2000	Socorro	LINEAR	·	2.0 km	MPC · JPL
387543	2000 WL_{32}	—	November 20, 2000	Socorro	LINEAR	·	1.4 km	MPC · JPL
387544	2000 YV	—	December 5, 2000	Socorro	LINEAR	HNS	1.6 km	MPC · JPL
387545	2001 AP_{46}	—	January 15, 2001	Socorro	LINEAR	·	2.6 km	MPC · JPL
387546	2001 BZ_{3}	—	December 29, 2000	Anderson Mesa	LONEOS	(1547)	1.9 km	MPC · JPL
387547	2001 BE_{5}	—	January 18, 2001	Socorro	LINEAR	·	1.2 km	MPC · JPL
387548	2001 BK_{6}	—	January 4, 2001	Socorro	LINEAR	·	2.2 km	MPC · JPL
387549	2001 BT_{18}	—	January 19, 2001	Socorro	LINEAR	·	1.9 km	MPC · JPL
387550	2001 FT_{128}	—	March 26, 2001	Socorro	LINEAR	JUN	1.2 km	MPC · JPL
387551	2001 FR_{182}	—	March 25, 2001	Kitt Peak	M. W. Buie	·	1.5 km	MPC · JPL
387552	2001 FS_{182}	—	March 21, 2001	Kitt Peak	Spacewatch	EUN	1.4 km	MPC · JPL
387553	2001 PY_{65}	—	August 15, 2001	Haleakala	NEAT	·	1.0 km	MPC · JPL
387554	2001 QT_{69}	—	August 17, 2001	Socorro	LINEAR	·	760 m	MPC · JPL
387555	2001 QH_{85}	—	August 19, 2001	Socorro	LINEAR	·	2.8 km	MPC · JPL
387556	2001 QW_{99}	—	August 22, 2001	Socorro	LINEAR	EUP	5.6 km	MPC · JPL
387557	2001 RE_{14}	—	September 10, 2001	Socorro	LINEAR	3:2	5.9 km	MPC · JPL
387558	2001 RQ_{42}	—	September 11, 2001	Socorro	LINEAR	BRA	1.2 km	MPC · JPL
387559	2001 RQ_{52}	—	September 12, 2001	Socorro	LINEAR	·	1.1 km	MPC · JPL
387560	2001 RW_{123}	—	September 12, 2001	Socorro	LINEAR	·	2.1 km	MPC · JPL
387561	2001 SP_{7}	—	September 18, 2001	Kitt Peak	Spacewatch	·	790 m	MPC · JPL
387562	2001 SL_{15}	—	September 16, 2001	Socorro	LINEAR	·	880 m	MPC · JPL
387563	2001 SE_{60}	—	September 17, 2001	Socorro	LINEAR	·	1.2 km	MPC · JPL
387564	2001 SB_{129}	—	September 16, 2001	Socorro	LINEAR	·	1.1 km	MPC · JPL
387565	2001 SL_{167}	—	September 19, 2001	Socorro	LINEAR	·	930 m	MPC · JPL
387566	2001 SY_{186}	—	September 19, 2001	Socorro	LINEAR	MAS	690 m	MPC · JPL
387567	2001 SJ_{252}	—	September 19, 2001	Socorro	LINEAR	·	3.8 km	MPC · JPL
387568	2001 SX_{263}	—	August 23, 2001	Socorro	LINEAR	·	3.5 km	MPC · JPL
387569	2001 SC_{285}	—	September 22, 2001	Kitt Peak	Spacewatch	·	1.2 km	MPC · JPL
387570	2001 SY_{292}	—	September 16, 2001	Socorro	LINEAR	T_{j} (2.99) · HIL · 3:2	7.4 km	MPC · JPL
387571	2001 SN_{332}	—	September 19, 2001	Kitt Peak	Spacewatch	KOR	1.3 km	MPC · JPL
387572	2001 SP_{344}	—	September 21, 2001	Anderson Mesa	LONEOS	·	3.5 km	MPC · JPL
387573	2001 TW_{4}	—	October 8, 2001	Palomar	NEAT	MAS	780 m	MPC · JPL
387574	2001 TN_{21}	—	October 11, 2001	Socorro	LINEAR	·	3.0 km	MPC · JPL
387575	2001 TP_{95}	—	October 14, 2001	Socorro	LINEAR	·	1.0 km	MPC · JPL
387576	2001 TT_{98}	—	October 14, 2001	Socorro	LINEAR	·	2.7 km	MPC · JPL
387577	2001 TU_{142}	—	October 10, 2001	Palomar	NEAT	·	2.9 km	MPC · JPL
387578	2001 TE_{177}	—	October 14, 2001	Socorro	LINEAR	(2076)	960 m	MPC · JPL
387579	2001 TV_{188}	—	October 14, 2001	Socorro	LINEAR	·	1.3 km	MPC · JPL
387580	2001 TB_{200}	—	October 11, 2001	Socorro	LINEAR	·	1.4 km	MPC · JPL
387581	2001 TV_{213}	—	October 13, 2001	Palomar	NEAT	EOS	2.2 km	MPC · JPL
387582	2001 TM_{215}	—	October 13, 2001	Palomar	NEAT	·	1.5 km	MPC · JPL
387583	2001 TV_{236}	—	October 8, 2001	Palomar	NEAT	·	1.1 km	MPC · JPL
387584	2001 UM_{71}	—	October 17, 2001	Kitt Peak	Spacewatch	·	940 m	MPC · JPL
387585	2001 UX_{81}	—	October 20, 2001	Socorro	LINEAR	NYS	1.3 km	MPC · JPL
387586	2001 UF_{166}	—	September 19, 2001	Kitt Peak	Spacewatch	·	2.3 km	MPC · JPL
387587	2001 UV_{172}	—	October 14, 2001	Kitt Peak	Spacewatch	·	1.2 km	MPC · JPL
387588	2001 UO_{209}	—	September 17, 1995	Kitt Peak	Spacewatch	·	3.5 km	MPC · JPL
387589	2001 UJ_{215}	—	October 23, 2001	Socorro	LINEAR	·	1.2 km	MPC · JPL
387590	2001 VV_{10}	—	November 10, 2001	Socorro	LINEAR	·	1.5 km	MPC · JPL
387591	2001 VP_{127}	—	November 11, 2001	Apache Point	SDSS	·	1.3 km	MPC · JPL
387592	2001 WV_{21}	—	November 18, 2001	Socorro	LINEAR	·	3.5 km	MPC · JPL
387593	2001 WO_{37}	—	November 17, 2001	Socorro	LINEAR	·	2.8 km	MPC · JPL
387594	2001 XN_{78}	—	November 17, 2001	Socorro	LINEAR	·	3.8 km	MPC · JPL
387595	2001 XS_{82}	—	December 11, 2001	Socorro	LINEAR	·	1.6 km	MPC · JPL
387596	2001 XZ_{129}	—	December 14, 2001	Socorro	LINEAR	·	3.0 km	MPC · JPL
387597	2001 XK_{151}	—	December 14, 2001	Socorro	LINEAR	·	1.1 km	MPC · JPL
387598	2001 XH_{161}	—	December 14, 2001	Socorro	LINEAR	·	1.4 km	MPC · JPL
387599	2001 XF_{180}	—	December 14, 2001	Socorro	LINEAR	·	1.3 km	MPC · JPL
387600	2001 XO_{245}	—	November 9, 2001	Socorro	LINEAR	·	3.6 km	MPC · JPL

== 387601–387700 ==
back to top

Designation			Discovery			Properties		Ref
Permanent	Provisional	Named after	Date	Site	Discoverer(s)	Category	Diam.	Ref
387601	2001 YB_{106}	—	December 17, 2001	Socorro	LINEAR	·	2.0 km	MPC · JPL
387602	2002 AK_{195}	—	January 13, 2002	Socorro	LINEAR	·	4.3 km	MPC · JPL
387603	2002 CJ_{110}	—	February 7, 2002	Socorro	LINEAR	·	1.1 km	MPC · JPL
387604	2002 CX_{181}	—	February 10, 2002	Socorro	LINEAR	·	3.0 km	MPC · JPL
387605	2002 CS_{207}	—	February 10, 2002	Socorro	LINEAR	L4	9.8 km	MPC · JPL
387606	2002 CT_{287}	—	February 9, 2002	Kitt Peak	Spacewatch	·	2.6 km	MPC · JPL
387607	2002 DD_{4}	—	February 22, 2002	Palomar	NEAT	·	680 m	MPC · JPL
387608	2002 EZ_{22}	—	March 11, 2002	Palomar	NEAT	L4	16 km	MPC · JPL
387609	2002 EW_{32}	—	March 11, 2002	Palomar	NEAT	·	3.4 km	MPC · JPL
387610	2002 EM_{76}	—	March 11, 2002	Kitt Peak	Spacewatch	·	1.4 km	MPC · JPL
387611	2002 EO_{76}	—	March 11, 2002	Kitt Peak	Spacewatch	·	1 km	MPC · JPL
387612	2002 EP_{77}	—	March 11, 2002	Kitt Peak	Spacewatch	·	740 m	MPC · JPL
387613	2002 EU_{82}	—	March 13, 2002	Palomar	NEAT	·	1.7 km	MPC · JPL
387614	2002 EC_{118}	—	March 10, 2002	Kitt Peak	Spacewatch	·	1.0 km	MPC · JPL
387615	2002 EY_{118}	—	March 10, 2002	Kitt Peak	Spacewatch	·	920 m	MPC · JPL
387616	2002 FS_{23}	—	March 18, 2002	Kitt Peak	Spacewatch	·	2.8 km	MPC · JPL
387617	2002 GU_{24}	—	April 13, 2002	Kitt Peak	Spacewatch	·	1.0 km	MPC · JPL
387618	2002 GJ_{48}	—	April 4, 2002	Palomar	NEAT	·	1.1 km	MPC · JPL
387619	2002 GD_{51}	—	April 5, 2002	Anderson Mesa	LONEOS	·	1.1 km	MPC · JPL
387620	2002 GC_{141}	—	April 13, 2002	Palomar	NEAT	·	950 m	MPC · JPL
387621	2002 GD_{179}	—	April 13, 2002	Palomar	NEAT	·	1.4 km	MPC · JPL
387622	2002 GR_{182}	—	April 15, 2002	Palomar	NEAT	EUN	1.2 km	MPC · JPL
387623	2002 HA_{18}	—	April 30, 2002	Palomar	NEAT	·	1.7 km	MPC · JPL
387624	2002 JR_{21}	—	May 9, 2002	Desert Eagle	W. K. Y. Yeung	·	1.7 km	MPC · JPL
387625	2002 JD_{63}	—	May 8, 2002	Socorro	LINEAR	·	2.5 km	MPC · JPL
387626	2002 JJ_{121}	—	May 5, 2002	Palomar	NEAT	·	2.7 km	MPC · JPL
387627	2002 JN_{128}	—	May 7, 2002	Palomar	NEAT	·	1.1 km	MPC · JPL
387628	2002 NM_{8}	—	July 9, 2002	Socorro	LINEAR	·	1.2 km	MPC · JPL
387629	2002 NP_{64}	—	July 2, 2002	Palomar	NEAT	EUN	1.7 km	MPC · JPL
387630	2002 OL_{17}	—	July 18, 2002	Socorro	LINEAR	·	2.6 km	MPC · JPL
387631	2002 PB_{11}	—	August 2, 2002	Needville	A. Cruz, W. G. Dillon	·	750 m	MPC · JPL
387632	2002 PD_{40}	—	August 9, 2002	Socorro	LINEAR	·	2.8 km	MPC · JPL
387633	2002 PV_{64}	—	August 3, 2002	Campo Imperatore	CINEOS	H	410 m	MPC · JPL
387634	2002 PR_{68}	—	August 6, 2002	Palomar	NEAT	·	1.8 km	MPC · JPL
387635	2002 PA_{136}	—	August 14, 2002	Socorro	LINEAR	·	2.6 km	MPC · JPL
387636	2002 PR_{182}	—	August 11, 2002	Palomar	NEAT	·	1.5 km	MPC · JPL
387637	2002 PJ_{183}	—	August 11, 2002	Palomar	NEAT	·	1.9 km	MPC · JPL
387638	2002 PK_{193}	—	August 15, 2002	Palomar	NEAT	·	2.1 km	MPC · JPL
387639	2002 QL_{8}	—	August 19, 2002	Palomar	NEAT	·	900 m	MPC · JPL
387640	2002 QK_{37}	—	August 30, 2002	Kitt Peak	Spacewatch	AST	1.8 km	MPC · JPL
387641	2002 QS_{67}	—	August 30, 2002	Palomar	NEAT	·	1.9 km	MPC · JPL
387642	2002 QJ_{79}	—	August 16, 2002	Palomar	NEAT	·	1.5 km	MPC · JPL
387643	2002 QC_{98}	—	August 18, 2002	Palomar	NEAT	·	1.8 km	MPC · JPL
387644	2002 QR_{106}	—	August 30, 2002	Palomar	NEAT	·	2.2 km	MPC · JPL
387645	2002 QY_{135}	—	August 30, 2002	Palomar	NEAT	NEM	2.6 km	MPC · JPL
387646	2002 QE_{138}	—	August 17, 2002	Palomar	NEAT	·	1.7 km	MPC · JPL
387647	2002 QN_{140}	—	August 28, 2002	Palomar	NEAT	·	2.2 km	MPC · JPL
387648	2002 RT_{25}	—	September 4, 2002	Palomar	NEAT	AMO	480 m	MPC · JPL
387649	2002 RW_{29}	—	September 4, 2002	Anderson Mesa	LONEOS	·	770 m	MPC · JPL
387650	2002 RN_{34}	—	September 4, 2002	Anderson Mesa	LONEOS	·	740 m	MPC · JPL
387651	2002 RG_{58}	—	September 5, 2002	Anderson Mesa	LONEOS	H	590 m	MPC · JPL
387652	2002 RH_{120}	—	September 3, 2002	Campo Imperatore	CINEOS	·	1.9 km	MPC · JPL
387653	2002 RO_{135}	—	September 10, 2002	Palomar	NEAT	·	1.8 km	MPC · JPL
387654	2002 RV_{147}	—	September 11, 2002	Palomar	NEAT	·	1.6 km	MPC · JPL
387655	2002 RS_{159}	—	September 12, 2002	Palomar	NEAT	·	770 m	MPC · JPL
387656	2002 RZ_{189}	—	September 14, 2002	Palomar	NEAT	DOR	2.4 km	MPC · JPL
387657	2002 RG_{207}	—	September 14, 2002	Palomar	NEAT	·	850 m	MPC · JPL
387658	2002 RX_{220}	—	September 15, 2002	Palomar	NEAT	·	2.5 km	MPC · JPL
387659	2002 RD_{233}	—	September 15, 2002	Palomar	R. Matson	KOR	1.7 km	MPC · JPL
387660	2002 RF_{236}	—	September 9, 2002	Palomar	R. Matson	·	790 m	MPC · JPL
387661	2002 RS_{240}	—	September 10, 2002	Haleakala	Lowe, A.	H	560 m	MPC · JPL
387662	2002 RK_{254}	—	September 14, 2002	Palomar	NEAT	·	1.7 km	MPC · JPL
387663	2002 RV_{259}	—	September 12, 2002	Palomar	NEAT	·	1.5 km	MPC · JPL
387664	2002 RW_{267}	—	September 13, 2002	Palomar	NEAT	·	600 m	MPC · JPL
387665	2002 RG_{270}	—	September 14, 2002	Palomar	NEAT	·	1.7 km	MPC · JPL
387666	2002 RK_{271}	—	September 4, 2002	Palomar	NEAT	·	2.0 km	MPC · JPL
387667	2002 RB_{282}	—	September 15, 2002	Palomar	NEAT	·	640 m	MPC · JPL
387668	2002 SZ	—	September 26, 2002	Palomar	NEAT	APO · PHA	280 m	MPC · JPL
387669	2002 SZ_{26}	—	August 11, 2002	Socorro	LINEAR	JUN	1.2 km	MPC · JPL
387670	2002 SL_{28}	—	September 30, 2002	Ondřejov	P. Pravec	·	1.5 km	MPC · JPL
387671	2002 SU_{33}	—	September 28, 2002	Haleakala	NEAT	T_{j} (2.98) · HIL · 3:2 · (6124)	5.6 km	MPC · JPL
387672	2002 SC_{43}	—	September 28, 2002	Haleakala	NEAT	AEO	1.6 km	MPC · JPL
387673	2002 SB_{44}	—	September 29, 2002	Haleakala	NEAT	·	5.3 km	MPC · JPL
387674	2002 SP_{67}	—	September 16, 2002	Palomar	NEAT	NEM	2.5 km	MPC · JPL
387675	2002 TO_{2}	—	October 1, 2002	Anderson Mesa	LONEOS	·	740 m	MPC · JPL
387676	2002 TG_{63}	—	October 3, 2002	Campo Imperatore	CINEOS	·	640 m	MPC · JPL
387677	2002 TB_{87}	—	October 3, 2002	Socorro	LINEAR	·	1.8 km	MPC · JPL
387678	2002 TK_{87}	—	October 3, 2002	Socorro	LINEAR	·	790 m	MPC · JPL
387679	2002 TF_{88}	—	October 3, 2002	Palomar	NEAT	·	2.5 km	MPC · JPL
387680	2002 TS_{129}	—	October 4, 2002	Palomar	NEAT	·	970 m	MPC · JPL
387681	2002 TP_{135}	—	October 4, 2002	Socorro	LINEAR	·	3.5 km	MPC · JPL
387682	2002 TY_{161}	—	October 5, 2002	Palomar	NEAT	H	620 m	MPC · JPL
387683	2002 TH_{178}	—	October 12, 2002	Socorro	LINEAR	H	690 m	MPC · JPL
387684	2002 TO_{270}	—	October 9, 2002	Socorro	LINEAR	·	730 m	MPC · JPL
387685	2002 TU_{303}	—	October 4, 2002	Apache Point	SDSS	EUN	1.2 km	MPC · JPL
387686	2002 TK_{308}	—	October 4, 2002	Apache Point	SDSS	·	2.3 km	MPC · JPL
387687	2002 TW_{309}	—	October 4, 2002	Apache Point	SDSS	·	2.5 km	MPC · JPL
387688	2002 TP_{339}	—	October 5, 2002	Apache Point	SDSS	·	660 m	MPC · JPL
387689	2002 TB_{379}	—	October 5, 2002	Palomar	NEAT	·	1.7 km	MPC · JPL
387690	2002 UD	—	October 18, 2002	Palomar	NEAT	·	810 m	MPC · JPL
387691	2002 UV_{1}	—	October 28, 2002	Nogales	C. W. Juels, P. R. Holvorcem	·	750 m	MPC · JPL
387692	2002 UK_{16}	—	October 30, 2002	Palomar	NEAT	·	830 m	MPC · JPL
387693	2002 UT_{21}	—	October 30, 2002	Palomar	NEAT	·	1.7 km	MPC · JPL
387694	2002 UL_{30}	—	October 30, 2002	Kitt Peak	Spacewatch	KOR	1.4 km	MPC · JPL
387695	2002 UT_{74}	—	October 30, 2002	Palomar	NEAT	·	730 m	MPC · JPL
387696	2002 VU_{9}	—	November 1, 2002	Palomar	NEAT	·	1.6 km	MPC · JPL
387697	2002 VG_{53}	—	November 6, 2002	Socorro	LINEAR	·	730 m	MPC · JPL
387698	2002 VG_{100}	—	November 11, 2002	Socorro	LINEAR	V	810 m	MPC · JPL
387699	2002 VA_{128}	—	November 13, 2002	Socorro	LINEAR	H	830 m	MPC · JPL
387700	2002 VE_{129}	—	November 5, 2002	Kitt Peak	Spacewatch	KOR	1.7 km	MPC · JPL

== 387701–387800 ==
back to top

Designation			Discovery			Properties		Ref
Permanent	Provisional	Named after	Date	Site	Discoverer(s)	Category	Diam.	Ref
387701	2002 VB_{134}	—	November 6, 2002	Socorro	LINEAR	V	670 m	MPC · JPL
387702	2002 WH_{4}	—	November 24, 2002	Palomar	NEAT	·	1.4 km	MPC · JPL
387703	2002 WG_{27}	—	November 23, 2002	Palomar	NEAT	·	880 m	MPC · JPL
387704	2002 XZ_{61}	—	December 11, 2002	Socorro	LINEAR	H	740 m	MPC · JPL
387705	2002 XM_{119}	—	December 10, 2002	Palomar	NEAT	·	800 m	MPC · JPL
387706	2002 YY_{25}	—	December 31, 2002	Socorro	LINEAR	·	1.5 km	MPC · JPL
387707	2003 AB_{17}	—	January 5, 2003	Socorro	LINEAR	H	780 m	MPC · JPL
387708	2003 AW_{19}	—	January 5, 2003	Socorro	LINEAR	·	3.0 km	MPC · JPL
387709	2003 AJ_{71}	—	January 10, 2003	Palomar	NEAT	·	2.6 km	MPC · JPL
387710	2003 BY_{35}	—	January 26, 2003	Kitt Peak	Spacewatch	EOS	2.3 km	MPC · JPL
387711	2003 BF_{54}	—	January 27, 2003	Palomar	NEAT	·	1.3 km	MPC · JPL
387712	2003 BZ_{57}	—	January 27, 2003	Socorro	LINEAR	·	1.4 km	MPC · JPL
387713	2003 BN_{59}	—	January 27, 2003	Anderson Mesa	LONEOS	TIR	3.2 km	MPC · JPL
387714	2003 BL_{84}	—	January 30, 2003	Anderson Mesa	LONEOS	·	1.1 km	MPC · JPL
387715	2003 BG_{92}	—	January 26, 2003	Anderson Mesa	LONEOS	·	3.0 km	MPC · JPL
387716	2003 CC_{14}	—	February 6, 2003	Kitt Peak	Spacewatch	NYS	1.2 km	MPC · JPL
387717	2003 DN_{4}	—	February 22, 2003	Desert Eagle	W. K. Y. Yeung	APO	500 m	MPC · JPL
387718	2003 DX_{5}	—	February 21, 2003	Palomar	NEAT	·	1.2 km	MPC · JPL
387719	2003 DN_{20}	—	February 22, 2003	Palomar	NEAT	·	5.0 km	MPC · JPL
387720	2003 DW_{24}	—	October 17, 1998	Kitt Peak	Spacewatch	·	910 m	MPC · JPL
387721	2003 EP_{1}	—	January 27, 2003	Socorro	LINEAR	·	3.0 km	MPC · JPL
387722	2003 EL_{2}	—	March 5, 2003	Socorro	LINEAR	·	2.8 km	MPC · JPL
387723	2003 ES_{6}	—	March 7, 2003	Socorro	LINEAR	·	4.2 km	MPC · JPL
387724	2003 FC_{8}	—	March 30, 2003	Socorro	LINEAR	H	750 m	MPC · JPL
387725	2003 FM_{10}	—	March 23, 2003	Kitt Peak	Spacewatch	MAS	650 m	MPC · JPL
387726	2003 FP_{19}	—	March 25, 2003	Palomar	NEAT	·	3.0 km	MPC · JPL
387727	2003 FQ_{23}	—	March 23, 2003	Kitt Peak	Spacewatch	·	3.3 km	MPC · JPL
387728	2003 FB_{26}	—	March 24, 2003	Kitt Peak	Spacewatch	·	3.0 km	MPC · JPL
387729	2003 FS_{40}	—	March 10, 2003	Kitt Peak	Spacewatch	·	4.1 km	MPC · JPL
387730	2003 FF_{42}	—	March 31, 2003	Wrightwood	J. W. Young	THM	1.8 km	MPC · JPL
387731	2003 FT_{76}	—	March 27, 2003	Palomar	NEAT	·	1.7 km	MPC · JPL
387732	2003 FJ_{123}	—	March 27, 2003	Kitt Peak	Spacewatch	·	3.0 km	MPC · JPL
387733	2003 GS	—	April 4, 2003	Anderson Mesa	LONEOS	ATE	340 m	MPC · JPL
387734	2003 GV_{4}	—	April 1, 2003	Socorro	LINEAR	·	4.6 km	MPC · JPL
387735	2003 GZ_{8}	—	April 1, 2003	Socorro	LINEAR	·	1.4 km	MPC · JPL
387736	2003 GR_{11}	—	April 1, 2003	Kitt Peak	Spacewatch	NYS	900 m	MPC · JPL
387737	2003 GP_{26}	—	April 4, 2003	Kitt Peak	Spacewatch	NYS	1.2 km	MPC · JPL
387738	2003 GW_{28}	—	April 4, 2003	Kitt Peak	Spacewatch	·	1.9 km	MPC · JPL
387739	2003 GJ_{56}	—	April 4, 2003	Kitt Peak	Spacewatch	·	3.5 km	MPC · JPL
387740	2003 GK_{57}	—	April 11, 2003	Kitt Peak	Spacewatch	·	1.2 km	MPC · JPL
387741	2003 HU_{5}	—	April 24, 2003	Kitt Peak	Spacewatch	T_{j} (2.94)	4.5 km	MPC · JPL
387742	2003 HT_{16}	—	April 24, 2003	Anderson Mesa	LONEOS	·	3.6 km	MPC · JPL
387743	2003 HV_{35}	—	April 27, 2003	Anderson Mesa	LONEOS	·	2.2 km	MPC · JPL
387744	2003 HW_{57}	—	April 26, 2003	Campo Imperatore	CINEOS	·	1.7 km	MPC · JPL
387745	2003 JS_{6}	—	May 1, 2003	Kitt Peak	Spacewatch	·	1.3 km	MPC · JPL
387746	2003 MH_{4}	—	June 26, 2003	Socorro	LINEAR	APO · PHA	370 m	MPC · JPL
387747	2003 NF_{11}	—	July 3, 2003	Kitt Peak	Spacewatch	·	1.4 km	MPC · JPL
387748	2003 ON_{18}	—	July 25, 2003	Socorro	LINEAR	MAR	1.5 km	MPC · JPL
387749	2003 OF_{26}	—	July 24, 2003	Palomar	NEAT	·	3.6 km	MPC · JPL
387750	2003 QC_{44}	—	August 22, 2003	Haleakala	NEAT	·	1.9 km	MPC · JPL
387751	2003 QK_{61}	—	August 23, 2003	Socorro	LINEAR	·	1.6 km	MPC · JPL
387752	2003 SE_{22}	—	September 16, 2003	Palomar	NEAT	·	2.2 km	MPC · JPL
387753	2003 SF_{32}	—	September 17, 2003	Palomar	NEAT	·	2.5 km	MPC · JPL
387754	2003 SZ_{37}	—	September 16, 2003	Palomar	NEAT	·	2.1 km	MPC · JPL
387755	2003 SJ_{47}	—	September 16, 2003	Anderson Mesa	LONEOS	·	2.0 km	MPC · JPL
387756	2003 SC_{59}	—	September 17, 2003	Anderson Mesa	LONEOS	·	2.2 km	MPC · JPL
387757	2003 SR_{68}	—	September 17, 2003	Kitt Peak	Spacewatch	·	1.4 km	MPC · JPL
387758	2003 SX_{72}	—	September 18, 2003	Kitt Peak	Spacewatch	NEM	1.8 km	MPC · JPL
387759	2003 SU_{95}	—	September 19, 2003	Palomar	NEAT	·	1.9 km	MPC · JPL
387760	2003 SF_{126}	—	September 19, 2003	Mount Graham	Mount Graham	·	1.4 km	MPC · JPL
387761	2003 SH_{130}	—	September 19, 2003	Palomar	NEAT	EUN	1.3 km	MPC · JPL
387762	2003 SQ_{177}	—	September 18, 2003	Palomar	NEAT	·	1.5 km	MPC · JPL
387763	2003 SH_{181}	—	September 20, 2003	Haleakala	NEAT	·	1.4 km	MPC · JPL
387764	2003 SF_{242}	—	September 27, 2003	Kitt Peak	Spacewatch	·	1.9 km	MPC · JPL
387765	2003 SO_{321}	—	September 21, 2003	Kitt Peak	Spacewatch	·	1.2 km	MPC · JPL
387766	2003 SL_{329}	—	September 22, 2003	Anderson Mesa	LONEOS	·	1.9 km	MPC · JPL
387767	2003 SM_{330}	—	September 26, 2003	Apache Point	SDSS	MAR	1.3 km	MPC · JPL
387768	2003 SJ_{386}	—	September 26, 2003	Apache Point	SDSS	·	1.7 km	MPC · JPL
387769	2003 SK_{394}	—	September 26, 2003	Apache Point	SDSS	·	1.4 km	MPC · JPL
387770	2003 SC_{433}	—	September 22, 2003	Kitt Peak	Spacewatch	·	2.3 km	MPC · JPL
387771	2003 TJ_{27}	—	October 1, 2003	Kitt Peak	Spacewatch	·	1.6 km	MPC · JPL
387772	2003 TU_{38}	—	September 20, 2003	Kitt Peak	Spacewatch	WIT	900 m	MPC · JPL
387773	2003 TF_{51}	—	September 29, 2003	Anderson Mesa	LONEOS	·	2.5 km	MPC · JPL
387774	2003 TM_{57}	—	October 5, 2003	Haleakala	NEAT	·	2.1 km	MPC · JPL
387775	2003 UJ_{28}	—	October 17, 2003	Kitt Peak	Spacewatch	·	1.6 km	MPC · JPL
387776	2003 UM_{29}	—	October 24, 2003	Socorro	LINEAR	·	1.5 km	MPC · JPL
387777	2003 UK_{44}	—	October 18, 2003	Kitt Peak	Spacewatch	·	2.0 km	MPC · JPL
387778	2003 UG_{52}	—	October 18, 2003	Palomar	NEAT	·	2.2 km	MPC · JPL
387779	2003 UA_{91}	—	October 20, 2003	Socorro	LINEAR	DOR	2.7 km	MPC · JPL
387780	2003 UR_{93}	—	October 18, 2003	Kitt Peak	Spacewatch	·	2.0 km	MPC · JPL
387781	2003 UH_{118}	—	September 21, 2003	Kitt Peak	Spacewatch	·	2.1 km	MPC · JPL
387782	2003 UU_{202}	—	October 21, 2003	Palomar	NEAT	·	2.1 km	MPC · JPL
387783	2003 UY_{249}	—	October 25, 2003	Socorro	LINEAR	(5)	1.6 km	MPC · JPL
387784	2003 UE_{297}	—	October 16, 2003	Kitt Peak	Spacewatch	(5)	1.2 km	MPC · JPL
387785	2003 UW_{298}	—	September 28, 2003	Anderson Mesa	LONEOS	·	2.1 km	MPC · JPL
387786	2003 UZ_{306}	—	September 28, 2003	Kitt Peak	Spacewatch	·	1.9 km	MPC · JPL
387787	2003 UA_{315}	—	October 23, 2003	Kitt Peak	M. W. Buie	·	2.3 km	MPC · JPL
387788	2003 UV_{347}	—	October 19, 2003	Apache Point	SDSS	·	1.3 km	MPC · JPL
387789	2003 UA_{351}	—	October 19, 2003	Apache Point	SDSS	·	1.8 km	MPC · JPL
387790	2003 UY_{362}	—	September 28, 2003	Anderson Mesa	LONEOS	·	2.0 km	MPC · JPL
387791	2003 UW_{377}	—	September 18, 2003	Kitt Peak	Spacewatch	ADE	1.9 km	MPC · JPL
387792	2003 WP_{15}	—	October 19, 2003	Kitt Peak	Spacewatch	AGN	1.3 km	MPC · JPL
387793	2003 WL_{25}	—	November 20, 2003	Socorro	LINEAR	APO +1km	1.7 km	MPC · JPL
387794	2003 WB_{94}	—	November 20, 2003	Socorro	LINEAR	·	1.7 km	MPC · JPL
387795	2003 WW_{95}	—	October 20, 2003	Kitt Peak	Spacewatch	·	2.2 km	MPC · JPL
387796	2003 WT_{129}	—	November 21, 2003	Palomar	NEAT	·	1.5 km	MPC · JPL
387797	2003 WY_{130}	—	November 21, 2003	Kitt Peak	Spacewatch	·	2.5 km	MPC · JPL
387798	2003 WZ_{194}	—	November 19, 2003	Kitt Peak	Spacewatch	·	2.5 km	MPC · JPL
387799	2003 YK_{15}	—	December 17, 2003	Socorro	LINEAR	·	3.3 km	MPC · JPL
387800	2003 YA_{182}	—	December 19, 2003	Kitt Peak	Spacewatch	AGN	1.2 km	MPC · JPL

== 387801–387900 ==
back to top

Designation			Discovery			Properties		Ref
Permanent	Provisional	Named after	Date	Site	Discoverer(s)	Category	Diam.	Ref
387801	2004 BQ_{58}	—	January 23, 2004	Socorro	LINEAR	TIR	3.1 km	MPC · JPL
387802	2004 BO_{127}	—	January 16, 2004	Kitt Peak	Spacewatch	AGN	1.3 km	MPC · JPL
387803	2004 CV_{25}	—	February 11, 2004	Kitt Peak	Spacewatch	·	2.5 km	MPC · JPL
387804	2004 CA_{54}	—	February 11, 2004	Kitt Peak	Spacewatch	·	510 m	MPC · JPL
387805	2004 DY_{58}	—	February 23, 2004	Socorro	LINEAR	·	820 m	MPC · JPL
387806	2004 DN_{65}	—	February 22, 2004	Kitt Peak	M. W. Buie	·	2.0 km	MPC · JPL
387807	2004 EM_{9}	—	March 14, 2004	Socorro	LINEAR	·	4.1 km	MPC · JPL
387808	2004 EX_{10}	—	March 15, 2004	Desert Eagle	W. K. Y. Yeung	·	840 m	MPC · JPL
387809	2004 EB_{12}	—	February 16, 2004	Kitt Peak	Spacewatch	·	910 m	MPC · JPL
387810	2004 EW_{16}	—	March 12, 2004	Palomar	NEAT	·	850 m	MPC · JPL
387811	2004 EH_{46}	—	March 15, 2004	Socorro	LINEAR	·	2.9 km	MPC · JPL
387812	2004 EE_{49}	—	March 15, 2004	Kitt Peak	Spacewatch	EOS	1.8 km	MPC · JPL
387813	2004 EL_{113}	—	January 27, 2004	Kitt Peak	Spacewatch	·	630 m	MPC · JPL
387814	2004 FK_{1}	—	March 16, 2004	Socorro	LINEAR	·	1.6 km	MPC · JPL
387815	2004 FR_{5}	—	March 19, 2004	Palomar	NEAT	·	960 m	MPC · JPL
387816	2004 FM_{17}	—	March 26, 2004	Socorro	LINEAR	ATE	480 m	MPC · JPL
387817	2004 FK_{22}	—	March 16, 2004	Siding Spring	SSS	·	4.7 km	MPC · JPL
387818	2004 FA_{27}	—	March 17, 2004	Kitt Peak	Spacewatch	·	750 m	MPC · JPL
387819	2004 FH_{69}	—	March 16, 2004	Kitt Peak	Spacewatch	THM	2.0 km	MPC · JPL
387820	2004 FC_{77}	—	March 18, 2004	Socorro	LINEAR	·	700 m	MPC · JPL
387821	2004 FM_{84}	—	March 18, 2004	Catalina	CSS	·	3.1 km	MPC · JPL
387822	2004 FH_{119}	—	March 23, 2004	Kitt Peak	Spacewatch	·	2.2 km	MPC · JPL
387823	2004 GU_{7}	—	April 12, 2004	Anderson Mesa	LONEOS	·	4.1 km	MPC · JPL
387824	2004 GZ_{13}	—	April 13, 2004	Catalina	CSS	·	1.0 km	MPC · JPL
387825	2004 GY_{16}	—	April 10, 2004	Palomar	NEAT	·	3.6 km	MPC · JPL
387826	2004 GD_{39}	—	April 15, 2004	Palomar	NEAT	·	830 m	MPC · JPL
387827	2004 GA_{40}	—	April 12, 2004	Palomar	NEAT	H	710 m	MPC · JPL
387828	2004 GH_{49}	—	April 12, 2004	Kitt Peak	Spacewatch	·	740 m	MPC · JPL
387829	2004 GE_{50}	—	April 12, 2004	Kitt Peak	Spacewatch	·	1.1 km	MPC · JPL
387830	2004 GA_{85}	—	April 14, 2004	Kitt Peak	Spacewatch	·	3.0 km	MPC · JPL
387831	2004 HR_{8}	—	April 16, 2004	Socorro	LINEAR	·	770 m	MPC · JPL
387832	2004 HN_{11}	—	April 19, 2004	Socorro	LINEAR	·	920 m	MPC · JPL
387833	2004 HE_{13}	—	April 16, 2004	Kitt Peak	Spacewatch	·	2.7 km	MPC · JPL
387834	2004 HJ_{24}	—	April 16, 2004	Socorro	LINEAR	H	820 m	MPC · JPL
387835	2004 HK_{53}	—	April 25, 2004	Kitt Peak	Spacewatch	·	2.5 km	MPC · JPL
387836	2004 HZ_{53}	—	April 20, 2004	Catalina	CSS	PHO	1.4 km	MPC · JPL
387837	2004 JJ_{6}	—	May 9, 2004	Kitt Peak	Spacewatch	·	740 m	MPC · JPL
387838	2004 JU_{26}	—	April 30, 2004	Kitt Peak	Spacewatch	·	1 km	MPC · JPL
387839	2004 KP_{11}	—	May 20, 2004	Kitt Peak	Spacewatch	·	1.1 km	MPC · JPL
387840	2004 KR_{12}	—	May 22, 2004	Catalina	CSS	·	2.3 km	MPC · JPL
387841	2004 LD	—	June 8, 2004	Socorro	LINEAR	H	690 m	MPC · JPL
387842	2004 LP_{21}	—	June 12, 2004	Socorro	LINEAR	·	3.7 km	MPC · JPL
387843	2004 ND	—	July 6, 2004	Campo Imperatore	CINEOS	·	1.2 km	MPC · JPL
387844	2004 NU_{19}	—	July 14, 2004	Socorro	LINEAR	·	1.3 km	MPC · JPL
387845	2004 NE_{25}	—	July 15, 2004	Socorro	LINEAR	·	1.4 km	MPC · JPL
387846	2004 OG_{3}	—	July 16, 2004	Socorro	LINEAR	·	1.2 km	MPC · JPL
387847	2004 OT_{8}	—	July 17, 2004	Socorro	LINEAR	NYS	1.4 km	MPC · JPL
387848	2004 OR_{10}	—	July 22, 2004	Siding Spring	SSS	slow	1.5 km	MPC · JPL
387849	2004 PS_{1}	—	August 6, 2004	Reedy Creek	J. Broughton	NYS	1.1 km	MPC · JPL
387850	2004 PS_{10}	—	August 7, 2004	Palomar	NEAT	EUN	1.4 km	MPC · JPL
387851	2004 PS_{28}	—	August 6, 2004	Palomar	NEAT	·	1.9 km	MPC · JPL
387852	2004 PN_{55}	—	August 8, 2004	Anderson Mesa	LONEOS	·	760 m	MPC · JPL
387853	2004 PR_{56}	—	August 9, 2004	Socorro	LINEAR	·	1.2 km	MPC · JPL
387854	2004 PH_{76}	—	August 9, 2004	Anderson Mesa	LONEOS	·	1.1 km	MPC · JPL
387855	2004 PW_{76}	—	August 9, 2004	Socorro	LINEAR	·	1.7 km	MPC · JPL
387856	2004 PU_{97}	—	August 14, 2004	Reedy Creek	J. Broughton	·	1.3 km	MPC · JPL
387857	2004 QA_{10}	—	August 21, 2004	Siding Spring	SSS	·	3.4 km	MPC · JPL
387858	2004 QX_{13}	—	August 24, 2004	Socorro	LINEAR	PHO	1.2 km	MPC · JPL
387859	2004 QX_{16}	—	August 23, 2004	Mayhill	Hutsebaut, R.	·	2.0 km	MPC · JPL
387860	2004 RH_{5}	—	September 4, 2004	Palomar	NEAT	·	1.4 km	MPC · JPL
387861	2004 RJ_{24}	—	September 8, 2004	Socorro	LINEAR	H	650 m	MPC · JPL
387862	2004 RC_{66}	—	September 8, 2004	Socorro	LINEAR	NYS	1.5 km	MPC · JPL
387863	2004 RW_{74}	—	August 19, 2004	Siding Spring	SSS	·	1.8 km	MPC · JPL
387864	2004 RK_{82}	—	September 9, 2004	Socorro	LINEAR	V	870 m	MPC · JPL
387865	2004 RE_{91}	—	September 8, 2004	Socorro	LINEAR	EUP	4.5 km	MPC · JPL
387866	2004 RH_{106}	—	September 8, 2004	Palomar	NEAT	·	3.1 km	MPC · JPL
387867	2004 RY_{128}	—	September 7, 2004	Kitt Peak	Spacewatch	·	1.1 km	MPC · JPL
387868	2004 RA_{166}	—	September 6, 2004	Siding Spring	SSS	NYS	1.0 km	MPC · JPL
387869	2004 RK_{174}	—	September 10, 2004	Socorro	LINEAR	·	1.6 km	MPC · JPL
387870	2004 RA_{197}	—	September 10, 2004	Socorro	LINEAR	·	1.8 km	MPC · JPL
387871	2004 RD_{252}	—	September 15, 2004	Socorro	LINEAR	APO	530 m	MPC · JPL
387872	2004 RF_{309}	—	September 13, 2004	Kitt Peak	Spacewatch	NYS	1.1 km	MPC · JPL
387873	2004 RC_{325}	—	September 13, 2004	Socorro	LINEAR	·	1.2 km	MPC · JPL
387874	2004 RR_{325}	—	September 13, 2004	Socorro	LINEAR	JUN	1.0 km	MPC · JPL
387875	2004 RO_{329}	—	September 15, 2004	Socorro	LINEAR	H	750 m	MPC · JPL
387876	2004 RX_{336}	—	September 15, 2004	Kitt Peak	Spacewatch	·	1.6 km	MPC · JPL
387877	2004 RZ_{337}	—	September 15, 2004	Kitt Peak	Spacewatch	NYS	1.3 km	MPC · JPL
387878	2004 RB_{347}	—	September 14, 2004	Socorro	LINEAR	·	1.1 km	MPC · JPL
387879	2004 SL_{10}	—	September 16, 2004	Siding Spring	SSS	PHO	1.0 km	MPC · JPL
387880	2004 TU_{4}	—	October 4, 2004	Kitt Peak	Spacewatch	·	1.6 km	MPC · JPL
387881	2004 TA_{7}	—	October 5, 2004	Socorro	LINEAR	·	1.6 km	MPC · JPL
387882	2004 TO_{13}	—	October 9, 2004	Socorro	LINEAR	H	680 m	MPC · JPL
387883	2004 TG_{15}	—	October 8, 2004	Kitt Peak	Spacewatch	·	1.2 km	MPC · JPL
387884	2004 TR_{43}	—	October 4, 2004	Kitt Peak	Spacewatch	(5)	1.0 km	MPC · JPL
387885	2004 TJ_{67}	—	October 5, 2004	Anderson Mesa	LONEOS	·	1.9 km	MPC · JPL
387886	2004 TZ_{68}	—	October 5, 2004	Anderson Mesa	LONEOS	·	1.3 km	MPC · JPL
387887	2004 TK_{80}	—	October 5, 2004	Kitt Peak	Spacewatch	(5)	1.0 km	MPC · JPL
387888	2004 TK_{83}	—	October 5, 2004	Kitt Peak	Spacewatch	(5)	1.1 km	MPC · JPL
387889	2004 TT_{107}	—	October 7, 2004	Kitt Peak	Spacewatch	MAS	680 m	MPC · JPL
387890	2004 TJ_{115}	—	October 4, 2004	Kitt Peak	Spacewatch	(5)	1.1 km	MPC · JPL
387891	2004 TO_{124}	—	October 7, 2004	Socorro	LINEAR	·	1.7 km	MPC · JPL
387892	2004 TV_{149}	—	October 6, 2004	Kitt Peak	Spacewatch	NYS	1.2 km	MPC · JPL
387893	2004 TN_{180}	—	October 7, 2004	Kitt Peak	Spacewatch	MAS	840 m	MPC · JPL
387894	2004 TA_{194}	—	October 7, 2004	Kitt Peak	Spacewatch	(5)	840 m	MPC · JPL
387895	2004 TU_{198}	—	October 7, 2004	Kitt Peak	Spacewatch	·	1.3 km	MPC · JPL
387896	2004 TK_{245}	—	October 7, 2004	Kitt Peak	Spacewatch	·	1.3 km	MPC · JPL
387897	2004 TR_{272}	—	October 9, 2004	Kitt Peak	Spacewatch	·	1.6 km	MPC · JPL
387898	2004 TM_{336}	—	October 10, 2004	Kitt Peak	Spacewatch	·	1.2 km	MPC · JPL
387899	2004 VB_{59}	—	November 9, 2004	Catalina	CSS	·	1.4 km	MPC · JPL
387900	2004 VB_{74}	—	November 12, 2004	Catalina	CSS	·	1.0 km	MPC · JPL

== 387901–388000 ==
back to top

Designation			Discovery			Properties		Ref
Permanent	Provisional	Named after	Date	Site	Discoverer(s)	Category	Diam.	Ref
387901	2004 VA_{79}	—	November 3, 2004	Kitt Peak	Spacewatch	T_{j} (2.98) · 3:2	5.7 km	MPC · JPL
387902	2004 VZ_{82}	—	November 10, 2004	Kitt Peak	Spacewatch	·	800 m	MPC · JPL
387903	2004 VJ_{88}	—	November 11, 2004	Kitt Peak	Spacewatch	(5)	1.1 km	MPC · JPL
387904	2004 VW_{93}	—	November 10, 2004	Kitt Peak	Spacewatch	(5)	1.1 km	MPC · JPL
387905	2004 WY_{1}	—	November 17, 2004	Campo Imperatore	CINEOS	·	1.8 km	MPC · JPL
387906	2004 XQ	—	December 1, 2004	Palomar	NEAT	EUN	1.9 km	MPC · JPL
387907	2004 XP_{26}	—	December 10, 2004	Kitt Peak	Spacewatch	·	1.4 km	MPC · JPL
387908	2004 XE_{49}	—	December 11, 2004	Socorro	LINEAR	·	2.3 km	MPC · JPL
387909	2004 XK_{49}	—	December 12, 2004	Campo Imperatore	CINEOS	·	1.5 km	MPC · JPL
387910	2004 XE_{54}	—	December 10, 2004	Kitt Peak	Spacewatch	NEM	2.7 km	MPC · JPL
387911	2004 XN_{85}	—	December 12, 2004	Kitt Peak	Spacewatch	·	1.5 km	MPC · JPL
387912	2004 XX_{105}	—	December 11, 2004	Socorro	LINEAR	·	1.5 km	MPC · JPL
387913	2004 XL_{122}	—	December 9, 2004	Catalina	CSS	·	2.4 km	MPC · JPL
387914	2004 XV_{128}	—	December 14, 2004	Socorro	LINEAR	·	1.3 km	MPC · JPL
387915	2004 XS_{162}	—	December 15, 2004	Socorro	LINEAR	(1547)	2.0 km	MPC · JPL
387916	2004 YU_{17}	—	December 18, 2004	Mount Lemmon	Mount Lemmon Survey	·	1.4 km	MPC · JPL
387917	2004 YH_{22}	—	December 18, 2004	Mount Lemmon	Mount Lemmon Survey	(1547)	1.6 km	MPC · JPL
387918	2004 YD_{27}	—	December 20, 2004	Mount Lemmon	Mount Lemmon Survey	·	2.1 km	MPC · JPL
387919	2004 YT_{32}	—	December 31, 2004	Junk Bond	Junk Bond	(5)	1.4 km	MPC · JPL
387920	2005 AJ_{35}	—	December 18, 2004	Socorro	LINEAR	·	2.4 km	MPC · JPL
387921	2005 AU_{51}	—	January 13, 2005	Catalina	CSS	·	2.0 km	MPC · JPL
387922	2005 AO_{81}	—	January 15, 2005	Socorro	LINEAR	·	1.9 km	MPC · JPL
387923	2005 BQ_{16}	—	January 16, 2005	Socorro	LINEAR	MAR	1.5 km	MPC · JPL
387924	2005 BD_{22}	—	January 16, 2005	Kitt Peak	Spacewatch	·	2.2 km	MPC · JPL
387925	2005 BU_{27}	—	January 17, 2005	Socorro	LINEAR	·	3.0 km	MPC · JPL
387926	2005 CQ_{2}	—	February 1, 2005	Catalina	CSS	·	1.9 km	MPC · JPL
387927	2005 CU_{2}	—	February 1, 2005	Kitt Peak	Spacewatch	·	1.9 km	MPC · JPL
387928	2005 CM_{18}	—	February 2, 2005	Catalina	CSS	EUN	2.1 km	MPC · JPL
387929	2005 CE_{29}	—	February 1, 2005	Kitt Peak	Spacewatch	·	1.7 km	MPC · JPL
387930	2005 CN_{29}	—	February 1, 2005	Kitt Peak	Spacewatch	·	1.6 km	MPC · JPL
387931	2005 CX_{30}	—	February 1, 2005	Kitt Peak	Spacewatch	·	2.3 km	MPC · JPL
387932	2005 CQ_{32}	—	February 2, 2005	Kitt Peak	Spacewatch	·	1.6 km	MPC · JPL
387933	2005 CD_{34}	—	January 13, 2005	Kitt Peak	Spacewatch	·	1.9 km	MPC · JPL
387934	2005 CV_{37}	—	February 6, 2005	Gnosca	S. Sposetti	JUN	1.1 km	MPC · JPL
387935	2005 CG_{71}	—	February 1, 2005	Kitt Peak	Spacewatch	·	1.8 km	MPC · JPL
387936	2005 EC_{31}	—	March 1, 2005	Kitt Peak	Spacewatch	·	2.2 km	MPC · JPL
387937	2005 EP_{44}	—	March 3, 2005	Kitt Peak	Spacewatch	·	1.6 km	MPC · JPL
387938	2005 EG_{47}	—	March 3, 2005	Kitt Peak	Spacewatch	·	2.3 km	MPC · JPL
387939	2005 EO_{47}	—	March 3, 2005	Kitt Peak	Spacewatch	ADE	2.2 km	MPC · JPL
387940	2005 EL_{53}	—	March 4, 2005	Kitt Peak	Spacewatch	·	2.1 km	MPC · JPL
387941	2005 EE_{66}	—	March 4, 2005	Catalina	CSS	·	2.6 km	MPC · JPL
387942	2005 EL_{78}	—	January 18, 2005	Catalina	CSS	·	2.7 km	MPC · JPL
387943	2005 EM_{138}	—	March 9, 2005	Socorro	LINEAR	·	2.5 km	MPC · JPL
387944	2005 ER_{140}	—	March 10, 2005	Mount Lemmon	Mount Lemmon Survey	·	1.7 km	MPC · JPL
387945	2005 EU_{148}	—	March 10, 2005	Kitt Peak	Spacewatch	·	2.1 km	MPC · JPL
387946	2005 EU_{175}	—	March 8, 2005	Socorro	LINEAR	·	2.7 km	MPC · JPL
387947	2005 EO_{179}	—	March 9, 2005	Kitt Peak	Spacewatch	·	2.0 km	MPC · JPL
387948	2005 ED_{181}	—	March 9, 2005	Catalina	CSS	·	2.4 km	MPC · JPL
387949	2005 EN_{231}	—	March 10, 2005	Mount Lemmon	Mount Lemmon Survey	MRX	1.0 km	MPC · JPL
387950	2005 EL_{237}	—	March 3, 2005	Kitt Peak	Spacewatch	KOR	1.5 km	MPC · JPL
387951	2005 EF_{240}	—	March 11, 2005	Kitt Peak	Spacewatch	KOR	1.5 km	MPC · JPL
387952	2005 ER_{242}	—	March 11, 2005	Catalina	CSS	·	2.5 km	MPC · JPL
387953	2005 EP_{327}	—	March 1, 2005	Kitt Peak	Spacewatch	EUN	1.4 km	MPC · JPL
387954	2005 GE_{15}	—	March 4, 2005	Mount Lemmon	Mount Lemmon Survey	AGN	1.1 km	MPC · JPL
387955	2005 GC_{30}	—	April 4, 2005	Catalina	CSS	·	2.0 km	MPC · JPL
387956	2005 GH_{48}	—	April 5, 2005	Mount Lemmon	Mount Lemmon Survey	·	2.7 km	MPC · JPL
387957	2005 GU_{57}	—	April 6, 2005	Mount Lemmon	Mount Lemmon Survey	·	2.0 km	MPC · JPL
387958	2005 GX_{63}	—	April 2, 2005	Catalina	CSS	·	2.7 km	MPC · JPL
387959	2005 GN_{99}	—	April 7, 2005	Kitt Peak	Spacewatch	DOR	2.9 km	MPC · JPL
387960	2005 GV_{106}	—	April 10, 2005	Mount Lemmon	Mount Lemmon Survey	HOF	2.4 km	MPC · JPL
387961	2005 GB_{109}	—	March 14, 2005	Mount Lemmon	Mount Lemmon Survey	·	2.0 km	MPC · JPL
387962	2005 GQ_{136}	—	April 10, 2005	Kitt Peak	Spacewatch	·	2.1 km	MPC · JPL
387963	2005 GJ_{141}	—	April 13, 2005	Catalina	CSS	·	4.2 km	MPC · JPL
387964	2005 GX_{180}	—	April 12, 2005	Kitt Peak	Spacewatch	·	2.9 km	MPC · JPL
387965	2005 GL_{182}	—	April 15, 2005	Catalina	CSS	·	2.5 km	MPC · JPL
387966	2005 GW_{222}	—	April 10, 2005	Kitt Peak	Spacewatch	·	1.7 km	MPC · JPL
387967	2005 HQ_{1}	—	April 16, 2005	Kitt Peak	Spacewatch	·	2.0 km	MPC · JPL
387968	2005 JL_{21}	—	May 4, 2005	Siding Spring	SSS	(13314)	2.4 km	MPC · JPL
387969	2005 JT_{23}	—	May 3, 2005	Kitt Peak	Spacewatch	KOR	1.5 km	MPC · JPL
387970	2005 JH_{33}	—	May 4, 2005	Mount Lemmon	Mount Lemmon Survey	·	1.8 km	MPC · JPL
387971	2005 JU_{41}	—	May 7, 2005	Mount Lemmon	Mount Lemmon Survey	KOR	1.4 km	MPC · JPL
387972	2005 JP_{50}	—	May 4, 2005	Kitt Peak	Spacewatch	·	1.8 km	MPC · JPL
387973	2005 JY_{150}	—	May 3, 2005	Kitt Peak	Spacewatch	·	2.1 km	MPC · JPL
387974	2005 JW_{170}	—	May 10, 2005	Cerro Tololo	M. W. Buie	AGN	1.1 km	MPC · JPL
387975	2005 LN_{6}	—	June 4, 2005	Catalina	CSS	·	1.4 km	MPC · JPL
387976	2005 LM_{8}	—	June 4, 2005	Reedy Creek	J. Broughton	·	2.7 km	MPC · JPL
387977	2005 LW_{53}	—	June 15, 2005	Mount Lemmon	Mount Lemmon Survey	·	2.1 km	MPC · JPL
387978	2005 MW_{44}	—	June 27, 2005	Kitt Peak	Spacewatch	V	820 m	MPC · JPL
387979	2005 NV	—	July 2, 2005	Kitt Peak	Spacewatch	·	4.1 km	MPC · JPL
387980	2005 NZ_{26}	—	July 5, 2005	Mount Lemmon	Mount Lemmon Survey	·	1.6 km	MPC · JPL
387981	2005 NQ_{30}	—	June 15, 2005	Mount Lemmon	Mount Lemmon Survey	·	3.9 km	MPC · JPL
387982	2005 NQ_{41}	—	July 4, 2005	Mount Lemmon	Mount Lemmon Survey	EOS	2.2 km	MPC · JPL
387983	2005 NG_{44}	—	July 7, 2005	Kitt Peak	Spacewatch	EOS	2.0 km	MPC · JPL
387984	2005 ON_{29}	—	July 31, 2005	Mauna Kea	P. A. Wiegert	·	1.9 km	MPC · JPL
387985	2005 QH_{2}	—	August 24, 2005	Palomar	NEAT	·	1.5 km	MPC · JPL
387986	2005 QN_{15}	—	August 25, 2005	Palomar	NEAT	·	1.1 km	MPC · JPL
387987	2005 QD_{17}	—	August 25, 2005	Palomar	NEAT	·	860 m	MPC · JPL
387988	2005 QM_{40}	—	August 26, 2005	Palomar	NEAT	·	1.4 km	MPC · JPL
387989	2005 QP_{55}	—	August 28, 2005	Kitt Peak	Spacewatch	·	710 m	MPC · JPL
387990	2005 QY_{57}	—	August 25, 2005	Palomar	NEAT	·	740 m	MPC · JPL
387991	2005 QJ_{61}	—	August 26, 2005	Palomar	NEAT	·	2.5 km	MPC · JPL
387992	2005 QQ_{65}	—	August 27, 2005	Anderson Mesa	LONEOS	·	5.3 km	MPC · JPL
387993	2005 QA_{78}	—	August 25, 2005	Palomar	NEAT	NYS	980 m	MPC · JPL
387994	2005 QZ_{81}	—	August 29, 2005	Socorro	LINEAR	·	1.1 km	MPC · JPL
387995	2005 QT_{90}	—	August 25, 2005	Palomar	NEAT	·	3.0 km	MPC · JPL
387996	2005 QD_{99}	—	August 27, 2005	Palomar	NEAT	·	3.2 km	MPC · JPL
387997	2005 QJ_{105}	—	August 27, 2005	Palomar	NEAT	·	1.1 km	MPC · JPL
387998	2005 QZ_{106}	—	August 27, 2005	Palomar	NEAT	·	3.7 km	MPC · JPL
387999	2005 QO_{111}	—	August 27, 2005	Palomar	NEAT	·	4.8 km	MPC · JPL
388000	2005 QU_{118}	—	August 28, 2005	Kitt Peak	Spacewatch	·	2.0 km	MPC · JPL

back to top

== See also ==
- Meanings of minor-planet names: 387001–388000
