= Gochashvili =

Georgian aristocratic family

Coat of arms of Bagration-Mukhranski, parent house of the House of Gochashvili

The House of Gochashvili (Georgian: გოჩაშვილი) was an old Georgian noble family, a collateral branch of the royal Bagrationi dynasty of Kartli, which flourished from the sixteenth century to the eighteenth century. It is now extinct.

== History ==
The House of Gochashvili has descended from Alexander (fl. 1526–1556), a younger son of Constantine II, the last king of the Kingdom of Georgia and the first king of the independent Kingdom of Kartli. The surname itself derives from Alexander's grandson Gocha, a notable military commander, who was killed during the Siege of Gori against the Ottomans 1599. In the middle of the seventeenth century, the family were in opposition to their reigning pro-Iranian cousins, and the two Gochashvili, George and Ioram, the father and the son, were blinded in 1638 and 1664, respectively. Ioram had even aspired to become king of Kartli and, relying on the support of the Duke of Aragvi, had plotted the overthrow of Vakhtang V, king of Kartli and member of the House of Mukhrani, who, like the Gochashvili, were collaterals of the royal Bagrationi. Following these setbacks, the Gochashvili declined to become one of numerous princely (tavadi) families and became extinct with the death of Ioram's grandson Garsevan sometime after 1736.

== Genealogy ==
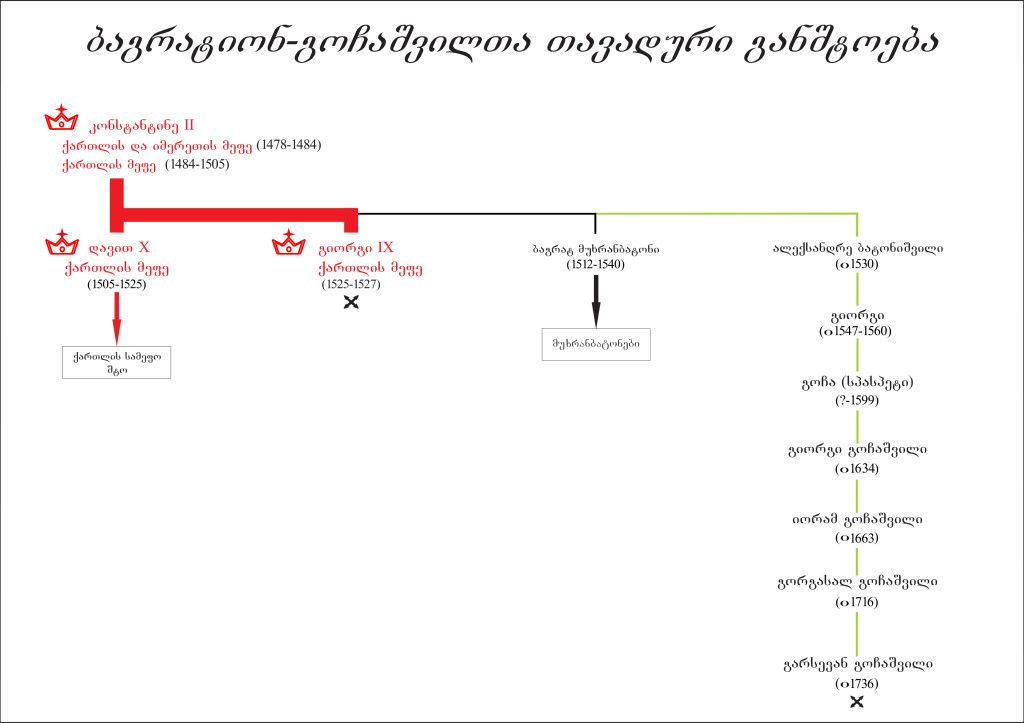
Genealogy of the House of Gochashvili, a Georgian princely family, representing collateral branch of the royal Bagration dynasty, reigning in the Kingdom of Kartli, which became extinct in the 18th century

- Alexander (fl. 1530)
  - Gorgasal (fl. 1540)
  - Constantine (fl. 1540–1560), married Princess of Imereti, a daughter of Prince Khosro of Imereti, grandson of Alexander II of Imereti
  - Melkisedek (fl. 1547–1560)
  - George (fl. 1547–1560)
    - Gocha (d. 1599)
      - George (fl. 1638)
        - Ioram (fl. 1664)
          - Gorgasal (fl. 1716)
            - Garsevan (fl. 1736)

== See also ==
Bagration-gochashvili Noble branch

Constantine II (1447–1505); King of Kartli and Imereti; 1478–1484; King of Kartli; 1484–1505
David X (1482–1526); King of Kartli; 1505–1525	George IX (1486–1534); King of Kartli; 1525–1527 ×	Bagrat Mukhranbatoni (c. 1487–c. 1540); 1512–1540	Alexander (fl. 1530)
Royal branch of Kartli	Mukhranbatoni	George (fl. 1547–1560)
Gocha (Spaspet) (d. 1599)
George Gochashvili (fl. 1634)
Ioram Gochashvili (fl. 1663)
Gorgasal Gochashvili (fl. 1716)
Garsevan Gochashvili (fl. 1636)
