= Battle of Karagak =

1543 battle in Meskheti, Georgia

Date	1543
Location	Karagak
Result	Georgian victory

Belligerents
Kingdom of Imereti: Principality of Guria	Ottoman Empire

Commanders and leaders
Bagrat III of Imereti; Rostom Gurieli	Musa Pasha †

The Battle of Karagak (Georgian: ქარაღაქის ბრძოლა) was fought between the armies of the Kingdom of Imereti and the Ottoman Empire at the place of Karagak, Meskheti, in 1543.

== History ==
At the request of Qvarqvare III’s son Kaikhosro, the Ottoman Empire invaded Imereti. By orders of the Ottoman Sultan the Kurdish beylerbey of Erzurum, Musa Pasha, was sent to Samtskhe with 22,000 men to conquer the surrounding area. Ottoman army equipped by European cannons besieged the Georgian-garrisoned fortress of Oltisi (now Oltu, Turkey). Bagrat called upon the neighboring Georgian potentates to come to aid. Only the prince of Guria Rostom Gurieli responded, while the prince of Mingrelia, Levan I Dadiani, refused to participate in the alliance, and later sided with the Ottomans, even traveling to Istanbul, where he received gifts and assurances of protection. Outnumbered Bagrat surrendered to Ottomans, however he resumed fighting as soon as Ottoman main army was retreated to Erzurum. Georgians unexpectedly annihilated remaining Ottoman garrison and later pursued main army which was decisively defeated at the battle of Karagak, Musa Paşa was himself killed in fighting.

The Ottomans returned in force two years later, and moved into the principality of Samtskhe, where Bagrat and his ally Luarsab I suffered a bitter defeat at the Battle of Sokhoista in 1545. As a result, Samtskhe wrested of Bagrat’s control, and came under the Ottoman hegemony.

== Aftermath ==
Samtskhe became vassal of the Ottoman Empire. Qvarqvare III's descendants ruled Samtskhe-Saatabago (until 1628) and then Childir Eyalet until 1820s.
