= Battle of Murjakheti =

Battle in Georgia

Date	12 August 1535
Location	Murjakheti, near Akhalkalaki, Samtskhe-Saatabago
Result	Imeretian victory
Territorial changes	Annexion of Samtskhe-Saatabago

Belligerents
Kingdom of Imereti; Principality of Mingrelia; Principality of Guria	(Principality of Samtskhe) Samtskhe-Saatabago

Commanders and leaders
Bagrat III; Rostom Gurieli	(Principality of Samtskhe) Qvarqvare III (POW)

The Battle of Murjakheti was fought between the armies of the Kingdom of Imereti and the Samtskhe-Saatabago at the place of Murjakheti near Akhalkalaki, on 12 August 1535.

== Background ==
During Qvarqvare III's reign Persian influence on Samtskhe was growing day by day. Because of that Ottomans greatly damaged the country and especially it's southwestern region. Meskhetian lords had recognized that under Qvarqvare's rule Samtskhe would finally turn to the Enemy's hands. They made an alliance with the Georgian kings, Bagrat III of Imereti and Luarsab I to end up Jaqelian rule and protect Samtskhe from dominant Muslim empires (Ottomans and Safavids).

== Battle ==
In 1535 King Bagrat III with help of prince Rostom Gurieli and Mingrelian allies invaded Samtskhe. He defeated and captured Qvarqvare III, the atabeg was captured by Gurieli's cup-bearer Isak Artumeladze, and eventually delivered to Bagrat. Georgians had annexed Samtskhe-Saatabago. Qvarqvare died in prison, while Rostom of Guria was awarded Adjara and Lazeti.

== Aftermath ==
Map of Kingdom of Imereti after the Battle of Murjakheti.

A few years later, Qvarqvare's survived youngest son Kaikhosro II requested Ottomans to expel Imeretian and Kartlian forces from Samtskhe. The Ottomans retaliated with a major invasion: Bagrat and Rostom were victorious at the Battle of Karagak in 1543, but decisively defeated, in 1545, at the Battle of Sokhoista, where Rostom's son Kaikhosro was killed. And Samtskhe became vassal of the Ottoman Empire.

== Sources ==
- Rayfield, Donald (2012). Edge of Empires, a History of Georgia. London: Reaktion Books. ISBN 978-1-78023-070-2.
