= Bagrat (son of Prince Teimuraz of Imereti) =

Prince of Imereti

Bagrat (Georgian: ბაგრატ, fl. 1590), of the Bagrationi dynasty, was a claimant to the throne of Imereti in 1590.

== Biography ==
According to the mainstream Georgian scholarship, Bagrat was a son of Prince Teimuraz and a grandson of King Bagrat III of Imereti. Professor Cyril Toumanoff considered Bagrat to have been a son of another Teimuraz, son of Prince Vakhtang of Imereti.

Enthroned through the support of George II Gurieli, Prince of Guria, Bagrat briefly ruled during the civil war in Imereti until being deposed by Simon I of Kartli in 1590.

== Family ==
According to the French historian Marie-Félicité Brosset, nothing more is known about Bagrat after he left Imereti, but his family was able to perpetuate itself in Kartli. Bagrat had one son, Alexander, who was living in Kartli. In 1604, a Russian embassy arrived in Georgia after Boris Godunov sought a Georgian groom for his daughter Xenia. When the embassy reached Kartli in 1605, Archbishop Theodosius told the Russian ambassadors that there was a prince from the land of Imereti named Alexander, who was handsome and not small in stature, and that they would see him themselves.

King George X also spoke about Alexander and informed the Russian ambassadors that there was a foreigner living with him from the land of Imereti, Bagrat's son Alexander: "He lives with me as a hostage, as security for the Imeretian King George III. He will not be suitable. I know that a worthy prince is needed for such a great matter." The Russian ambassadors saw Prince Alexander at the court of King George X. They described him as ordinary-looking: his face was pitted with pockmarks, his eyes were small, and, in addition, he was weak.

== Bibliography ==
- Allen, W. E. D. (1970). Russian Embassies to the Georgian Kings, 1589–1605: Volumes I and II. Taylor & Francis. ISBN 978-1-317-06040-6.
- Toumanoff, Cyril (1976). Manuel de Généalogie et de Chronologie pour l'histoire de la Caucasie chrétienne (Arménie, Géorgie, Albanie) [Manual of Genealogy and Chronology of Christian Caucasian History (Armenia, Georgia, Albania)] (in French). Rome: Edizioni Aquila.
