= David XI =

King of Kartli
- Reign: 1569–1578
- Predecessor: Simon I
- Successor: Simon I
- Born: 1540
- Died: 1582 (aged 41–42)
- Spouse: Helen
- Issue Among others: Bagrat VII; Rostom of Kartli (ill.)
- Dynasty: Bagrationi
- Father: Luarsab I
- Mother: Tamar of Imereti
- Religion: Shia Islam (formerly Georgian Orthodox Church)

David XI (Georgian: დავით XI, romanized: davit XI; 1540–1582), also known as Daud Khan (Georgian: დაუთ-ხანი, romanized: daut-khani; Persian: داود خان, romanized: Dāwūd Khān;) was king (mepe) of Kartli. A convert to Islam, he was appointed as Khan of Kartli by the Iranian Shah Tahmasp I from 1562 (effectively from 1569) to 1578.

== Biography ==
David was a brother of the Kartlian king Simon I, who led a long-lasting liberation war against the Safavid Persian and Ottoman empires. In December 1561, David repaired to Qazvin to offer his submission to Shah Tahmasp, converted to Islam and adopted the name of Daud Khan. The shah appointed him ruler in Kartli, elevated him to the rank of farzand ("son") at his investiture, and sent with a Persian army to claim the power. He may have been an unnamed Georgian prince reported by the English explorer Anthony Jenkinson as attending his audience with Shah Tahmasp on 20 November 1562, but Daud appears to have been returned to Georgia in August 1562 and the Georgian prince of Jenkinson's report could have been another Georgian renegade, Prince Jesse of Kakheti (Isa Khan).

Relying on the Persian occupation forces and a few loyal nobles, Daud was in control of the Georgian capital Tbilisi and the province of Lower Kartli, while the rest of the kingdom remained faithful to Simon. The rival brothers met on the battlefield on several occasions. The hostilities took place mainly around Tbilisi, which was blockaded by Simon's forces from 1567 to 1569. Although the king won the battles at Dighomi (1567) and Samadlo (1569), the Persians eventually prevailed and took Simon captive at the Battle of Partskhisi, 1569. He was sent in chains to the fortress of Alamut, and Daud Khan assumed nominal control of all of Kartli. As previously, he relied on the Persians and paid an annual tribute to the Shah. A patriotic alliance of nobles led by Prince Sachino Baratashvili continued, however, resistance to the renegade Georgian ruler.

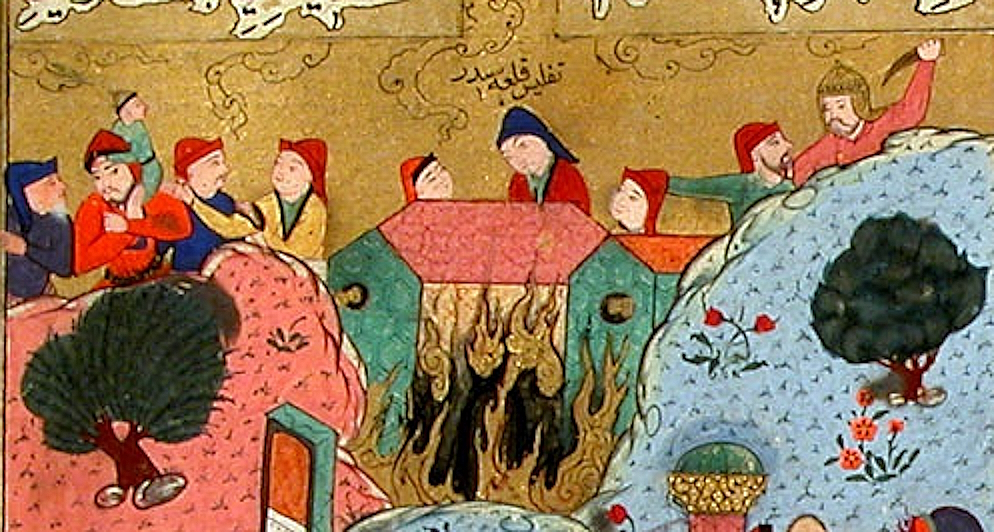
Capture of Tbilisi by the Ottomans in 21-24 August 1578, under Osman Pasha and Mustafa Pasha, following the departure of David XI ("Daud Khan") from the city, during the Ottoman–Safavid War (1578–1590). Secaatname (1586)

In 1578, a peace between the Safavids and the Ottomans collapsed. The Turkish army commanded by Lala Mustafa Pasha overran much of Georgia and dislodged Daud Khan, who had burnt the citadel of Tbilisi and taken shelter at Lorri. The Shah presently freed Simon to fight against the Ottomans and reinstated him as king of Kartli. In retaliation, Daud Khan handed the control over Lorri to the Turks and fled to Istanbul, where he was welcomed and granted lordship over two sanjaks. His sons, Bagrat and Khosro, took shelter in Persia. During his stay in Turkey, Daud Khan compiled two Ottoman-era medical treatises (qarabadin) and translated it into Georgian, sending a copy to his motherland.

== Family ==
David XI was married to Helen (fl. 1569–1578), a relative of King Alexander II of Kakheti. They had the following children:

- Bagrat VII (died 1619), King of Kartli (r. 1616–1619);
- Prince Luarsab;
- an unnamed daughter, who married Asanbeg (Kaikhosro) Baratashvili;
- an unnamed daughter, who married first Baadur I, Duke of Aragvi, and later Sazverel Chijavadze;
- an unnamed daughter, who had two known children: a daughter, who married Shanshe of Ksani, and a son, Adam-Sultan Andronikashvili. Adam-Sultan had a daughter, Tamar, who married Prince Luarsab of Kartli (died 1652), heir apparent of King Rostom of Kartli.

By a concubine, a peasant woman from Tsavkisi, David had a natural son:

- Rostom of Kartli (born Kaikhosro/Khosro-Mirza; 1565–1658), who was raised in Persia, served as darugha of Isfahan, and later became King of Kartli (r. 1633–1658).

== Sources ==
- Floor, Willem (2001). Safavid Government Institutions. Costa Mesa, California: Mazda Publishers. ISBN 978-1568591353.
- Karchava, Tea (2018). "აღმოსავლეთში ინგლისელთა სავაჭრო და დიპლომატიური მიზნებისა და საქართველოს ისტორიის ზოგიერთი საკითხის დაზუსტებისთვის (ენტონი ჯენკინსონის რელაციონის მიხედვით)" [England's commercial and diplomatic goals In the east and some issues of Georgian history (according to Anthony Jenkinson’s notes)]. Proceedings. Institute of Georgian History. Faculty of Humanities. Ivane Javakhishvili Tbilisi State University (in Georgian and English). 14 (14): 206–232.
- Rayfield, Donald (2012). Edge of Empires: A History of Georgia. London: Reaktion Books. ISBN 978-1-78023-070-2.
- Brosset, Marie-Félicité (1856). Histoire de la Georgie depuis l'antiquite jusqu'au 19. siecle (in French). Vol. 5. l'acad. Imper. des sciences.
- Toumanoff, Cyril (1976). Manuel de Généalogie et de Chronologie pour l'histoire de la Caucasie chrétienne (Arménie, Géorgie, Albanie) [Manual of Genealogy and Chronology of Christian Caucasian History (Armenia, Georgia, Albania)] (in French). Rome: Edizioni Aquila.

Preceded by Simon I	King of Kartli; 1569–1578	Succeeded by Simon I
