= Tamar of Imereti (died 1556) =

16th-century Queen of Kartli

Tamar (Georgian: თამარი) (died 1556) was a Georgian princess of the royal Bagrationi dynasty.

Tamar was titled as "დედოფალთ დედოფალი თამარ" (dedopalt dedopali tamar) "Tamar the Queen of Queens".

Tamar was a daughter of King Bagrat III of Imereti.

== Children ==
Tamar and King Luarsab I had eight children:

- A daughter, who married George, son of Levan of Kakheti;
- A son, who died in 1536 and was buried at Mtskheta;
- Simon I of Kartli (1537–1611), King of Kartli (r. 1556–1569, 1578–1599);
- David XI (1540–c. 1582), King of Kartli (r. 1569–1578);
- Vakhtang (fl. 1546–1605), sometime governor of Akhaldaba and Dirbi. He was married to a certain Tinatin and had a son, Teimuraz-Mirza, and a daughter, Tamar. Teimuraz-Mirza’s son, Luarsab (died 1652), was adopted by King Rostom of Kartli as his heir in 1639. Tamar married Prince Paremuz Amilakhvari;
- Alexander (fl. 1546–1573);
- Levan;
- A daughter, who married Kekaoz Chkheidze (fl. 1570–1590). Their son, Gorgasal Chkheidze of Racha (fl. 1590–1629), married a daughter of Giorgi Saakadze.
