= Bagrat III =

Bagrat III may refer to:

- Bagrat III of Georgia, King of the Kingdom of Georgia in 1008–1014
- Bagrat III of Imereti, King of the Kingdom of Imereti in 1510–1565
