= Mamia IV Dadiani =

Prince of Mingrelia
- 1st reign: 1573–1578
- Predecessor: George III Dadiani
- Successor: George III Dadiani
- 2nd reign: 1582–1590
- Predecessor: George III Dadiani
- Successor: Manuchar I Dadiani
- Died: 1590
- Spouse: Daughter of Rostom Gurieli
- House: Dadiani
- Father: Levan I Dadiani
- Religion: Georgian Orthodox Church (Catholicate of Abkhazia)

Mamia IV Dadiani (Georgian: მამია IV დადიანი; died 1590) was Prince of Mingrelia, of the House of Dadiani, from 1573 to 1578 and again from 1582 until his death. He was a younger son of Levan I Dadiani.

Mamia Dadiani's career unfolded against the background of an increasingly destructive civil unrest in the successor states of the Kingdom of Georgia in which the rulers of Mingrelia, in the former kingdom's west, played a critical role. His first accession to power was the result of a coup against his own brother, George III Dadiani, with whom he eventually reconciled in exchange of new estates. His second term, after succeeding on the death of George III Dadiani, was consumed by wars with his in-laws, the prince of Guria and king of Imereti. The latter, Levan of Imereti, fell in Mamia's hands and died in captivity. Dadiani himself died without seeing his protégé firmly established on the throne of Imereti. He was succeeded by his younger brother, Manuchar I Dadiani.

== Career ==
=== Early life and first rule ===
Mamia IV Dadiani was a son of Levan I Dadiani, Prince of Mingrelia, and younger brother of Levan's successor, George III Dadiani. He was married to a daughter of Rostom Gurieli, Prince of Guria. In 1573 or, according to the historian Cyril Toumanoff, in 1574, Mamia deposed his brother with the support of George Dadiani's old foe and his brother-in-law George II Gurieli, Prince of Guria, and assumed control of Mingrelia. George Dadiani fled to Abkhazia and employed the Abkhaz-Circassian forces to reclaim the throne, but Gurieli's army successfully protected Mamia. George Dadiani, in despair, solicited King George II of Imereti for mediation. A subsequent peace deal brokered by the king restored George III Dadiani and granted to Mamia Sachilao, the former possessions of the Chiladze noble family, in fief.

=== Second rule ===
Mamia regained the government of Mingrelia after his brother's death in 1582, whereupon he instigated Gurieli to incarcerate the late Dadiani's underage son Levan. The boy could not tolerate confinement and, while trying to escape, jumped out of window to his death. The ambitious Dadiani then exploited the incident to attack Guria in 1583. George Gurieli was defeated and fled to Constantinople. He was able to reclaim his principality with the Ottoman support after the death of Mamia's candidate, Vakhtang I Gurieli, in 1587.

Mamia Dadiani then went ahead to extend his influence to the royal court of Imereti. In 1586, he married off his sister Marekh to the young king of Imereti, Levan. In 1588, however, when Levan was attacked by his counterpart from eastern Georgia, King Simon I of Kartli, Dadiani, preoccupied with his own disputes with Gurieli, ignored the king's call to arms. Levan, once recovered from the attack, warred with Dadiani. Mamia advanced and defeated the king in his capital, Kutaisi. Levan was taken prisoner by his victorious brother-in-law and cast in the Skhepi castle, where he died in 1590. Dadiani and Gurieli then advanced rival claimants to the throne of Imereti, Rostom and Bagrat, respectively. Imereti became engulfed in a civil war, which was still raging when Mamia died in 1590, being succeeded by his younger brother, Manuchar I.

Mamia IV Dadiani House of Dadiani Born: ? Died: 1590
Regnal titles
Preceded by George III Dadiani	Prince of Mingrelia; 1573–1578	Succeeded by George III Dadiani
Preceded by George III Dadiani	Prince of Mingrelia; 1582–1590	Succeeded by Manuchar I Dadiani
