= Bagrat III of Imereti =

King of Imereti from 1510 to 1565

Bagrat III ბაგრატ III
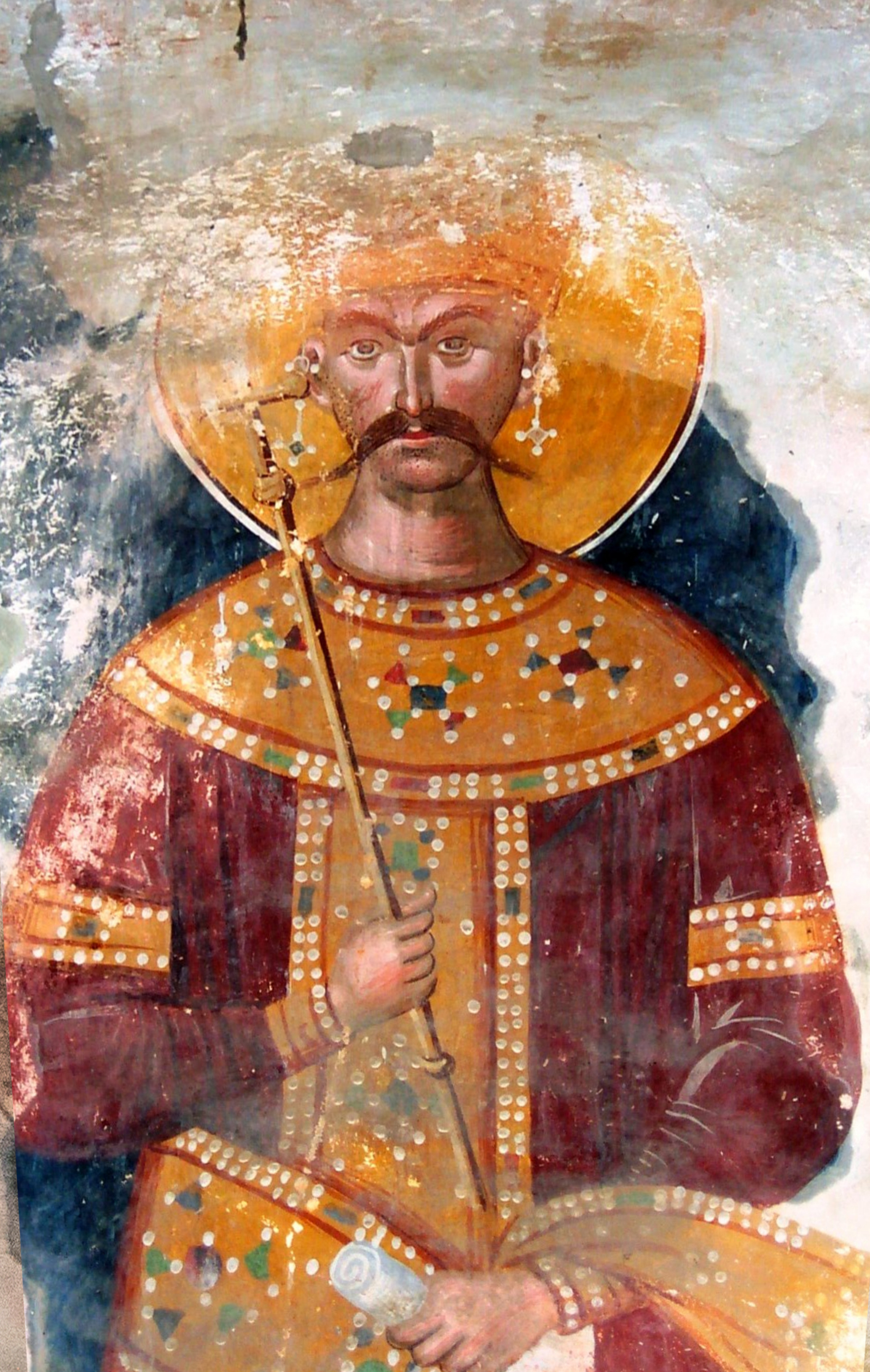
- Fresco of Bagrat III from the Gelati Monastery.

King of Imereti
- Reign: 1510–1565
- Predecessor: Alexander II
- Successor: George II
- Born: 23 September 1495
- Died: 1565 (aged 69–70)
- Burial: Gelati Monastery
- Spouse: Helen
- Issue Among others: George II of Imereti; Prince Constantine; Tamar, Queen of Kartli
- Dynasty: Bagrationi
- Father: Alexander II of Imereti
- Mother: Tamar
- Religion: Georgian Orthodox Church (Catholicate of Abkhazia)
- Khelrtva

Bagrat III (Georgian: ბაგრატ III; 23 September 1495 – 1565), of the Bagrationi dynasty, was the King (mepe) of the Kingdom of Imereti from 1510 to 1565, one of the three Georgian kingdoms that shared control over Georgia following its division in 1490.

Bagrat ascended the throne at the age of fifteen after the death of his father. Throughout his reign, he faced numerous invasions by the Ottoman Empire, notably in 1512, 1543, 1545, and 1549. These invasions led to widespread devastation across his realm and marked the beginning of the decline of a once-powerful western Georgian kingdom. Although Bagrat initially controlled extensive territories, he gradually lost authority over Abkhazia, Samtskhe, and, toward the end of his reign, over the strong principalities of Guria and Mingrelia. His struggles against rebellious vassals proved fruitless, and by the time of his death, after fifty-five years of rule, his dominion had been reduced to the capital city of Kutaisi and a few surrounding agricultural provinces.

Bagrat III is particularly remembered for refusing to convert to Islam, unlike several contemporary Georgian rulers. He actively promoted the construction of new churches and strengthened the influence of the Catholicate of Abkhazia. He is also notable for abolishing slavery, a measure that, while moral in intent, had a detrimental effect on the agrarian economy of his kingdom.

== Biography ==
=== Accession to the Throne ===
Map of Georgia at the beginning of the 16th century.

Bagrat was born on 23 September 1495, the eldest son of King Alexander II of Imereti and Queen Tamar. Little is known about his early life, which took place during ongoing conflicts with the neighboring Georgian Kingdom of Kartli and the Ottoman Empire. (Note: In 1509, Alexander II of Imereti invaded Kartli and temporarily controlled all territories west of Gori.)

In April 1510, Alexander II died of illness in Kutaisi following a campaign against the Ottomans. Bagrat succeeded to the throne of Imereti at the age of fourteen. The early years of his reign were marked by internal conflict, including a rebellion led by his younger brother, Vakhtang.

In 1512, Vakhtang fled to Kartli, where he was besieged and defeated by Bagrat at Mokhisi. After abandoning his father’s territorial gains in Kartli, Bagrat secured a peace settlement with Vakhtang through the mediation of King David X of Kartli.

=== Early Ottoman Attacks ===
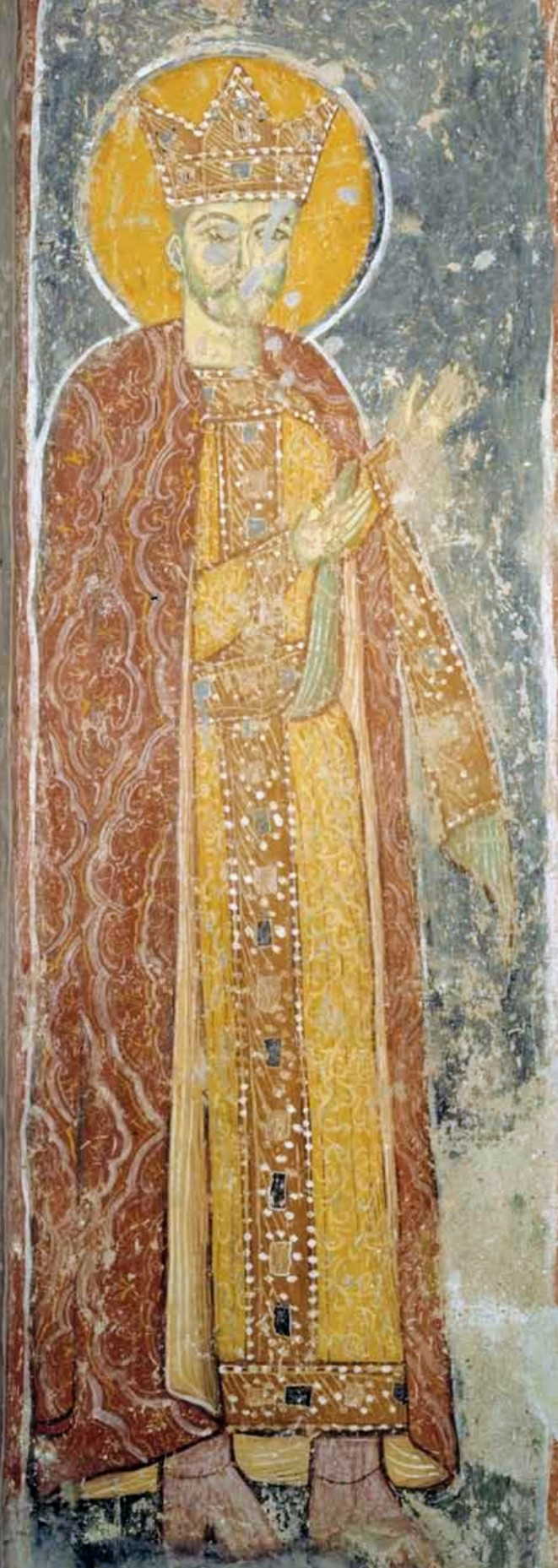
Coronation of King Bagrat III, 1520s, Gelati Monastery.

In 1512 (or 1510, according to historian Kalistrat Salia), the Ottoman Empire once again turned its attention to western Georgia, forming a coalition with the Principality of Samtskhe. Prince Mzetchabuk Jaqeli of Samtskhe joined his forces with the Ottomans at Perseti before advancing into Imereti during the summer. The capital, Kutaisi, fell with little resistance, forcing King Bagrat III to retreat into the mountains of Meskheti. During this first invasion, the Ottomans sacked Kutaisi, destroyed surrounding villages, and burned the Gelati Monastery, the burial site of former Georgian monarchs.

At only seventeen years old, Bagrat organized a swift counteroffensive, rallying troops from across his realm. By winter, he succeeded in driving the Ottoman army back to the Zekari Pass, where he threatened to encircle and cut off their forces. Confronted with this maneuver, the Ottomans withdrew southward, ending their campaign in Imereti.

Despite this success, attacks continued in the northwest of the kingdom, where the Circassian tribe of the Zygians (Note: Contemporary Georgian sources refer to the tribe as the ‘Jiks’, derived from ‘Jikethi’, but the modern historical community finds no other reference to this tribe and identifies it with the historical Zygians.) launched naval raids against the ports of Abkhazia and Mingrelia. The Zygians were at the time financed and influenced by the Crimean Khanate, an important Ottoman vassal. These pirates captured numerous Georgians, selling them into slavery in Turkish markets. Determined to end the raids, Bagrat III prepared a punitive expedition.

In January 1533, Bagrat led a joint offensive against the Zygians with the support of Princes Mamia III of Mingrelia and Mamia I of Guria. During the first naval battle, fought on 30 January off the coast of Gagra, the Georgian allies achieved a decisive victory over the Circassian pirates. However, the following day, a betrayal by the Abkhaz nobles led by Tsandia Inal-Ipa resulted in a disastrous defeat. Prince Mamia III of Mingrelia was killed in battle, while Mamia I of Guria was captured by the Zygians.

King Bagrat III sent Malachia I, Catholicos of Abkhazia, to negotiate the return of the captured prince and the body of Mamia III of Mingrelia. The Georgian defeat marked the end of Orthodox dominance in the northwestern regions of Abkhazia, where Islam began to spread with Ottoman support.

=== Domestic Policy ===
royal charter of King Bagrat III from 1512.

Following the Ottoman invasion of 1512, Bagrat III devoted the early part of his reign to restoring the damage inflicted on Kutaisi. With the assistance of a noble named Joseph Phanelidze, he repurchased and rebuilt the Gelati Monastery, entrusting its care to Phanelidze and his descendants. In return, Phanelidze was granted ownership of the surrounding lands and villages, under the condition that he maintain the monastery, while the king retained unrestricted hunting rights in the area.

That same year, Bagrat recognized Mamia III Dadiani as Prince of Mingrelia following the death of Liparit II. (Note: According to Vakhushti, the king of Imereti had to accept the accession of a new vassal prince by tradition.) By tradition, Mamia Dadiani also assumed the post of Mandaturtukhutsesi (Minister of the Interior), while Mamia Gurieli, who became vassal ruler of Guria in 1512, was appointed Amirspasalar (commander-in-chief) of the royal forces.

After the reconstruction of Gelati, Bagrat transferred the religious center of Imereti from Bichvinta—the seat of the Catholicate of Abkhazia—to Gelati. This move both strengthened royal influence over the church and responded to the growing spread of Islam in Abkhazia. Unlike Bichvinta, located on the Black Sea coast in northern Abkhazia, Gelati lay close to the royal capital of Kutaisi. In 1519, Bagrat appointed Malachia Abashidze as Catholicos, succeeding Stephen, who had led the Church since 1490. Malachia held the office until 1540, after which the line of patriarchs is unknown until Bagrat’s appointment of Eudemios Tchkheidze in 1557.

The king also worked to restore lands devastated by Ottoman incursions, redistributing them among loyal subjects. In recognition of his fidelity, Shoshita Tchkheidze was granted governance over Racha, a duchy in northern Imereti. Bagrat later convened a council of church leaders from the Catholicosate of Abkhazia, which enacted new decrees against the enslavement of Georgians, prescribing the death penalty for anyone involved in the slave trade. Despite these reforms, Ottoman-controlled regions continued the practice of slavery, and after Bagrat’s death, the decrees were soon forgotten. The council also codified harsh penalties for theft and murder.

Bagrat maintained a complex and often strained relationship with his eastern neighbor, the Kingdom of Kartli. In 1520, he allied with Mamia I of Guria and Qvarqvare III Jaqeli of Samtskhe to invade Kartli in an effort to end the ongoing conflict between that kingdom and Kakheti. In a rare act of Georgian unity, Bagrat successfully negotiated peace, establishing defined borders and a mutual defense pact between Kartli and Kakheti. The spirit of unity persisted in 1525 when King Levan of Kakheti and King George IX of Kartli accompanied Bagrat on a pilgrimage to Jerusalem.

However, the political balance shifted in March 1526, when Bagrat arranged the marriage of his daughter, Tamar, to Prince Luarsab of Kartli, the king’s nephew and heir. The alliance between Imereti and Kartli quickly turned opportunistic: in 1527, Bagrat invaded Kartli, deposed King George IX, and installed his son-in-law on the throne. In return, Imereti annexed all territories west of the Prone River, including the strategic towns of Surami and Borjomi. Relations between the two realms remained unstable in the following decades. Under Ottoman pressure in the 1530s, Bagrat returned the conquered lands to King Luarsab in exchange for military support. Later, in 1546, Bagrat III was among several Georgian monarchs—including Kaikhosro II Jaqeli and Levan of Kakheti—who pledged allegiance to the Safavid shah Tahmasp I at Akhalkalaki, offering assistance in an offensive against Kartli in return for Persian protection against Ottoman aggression.

=== War in Samtskhe ===
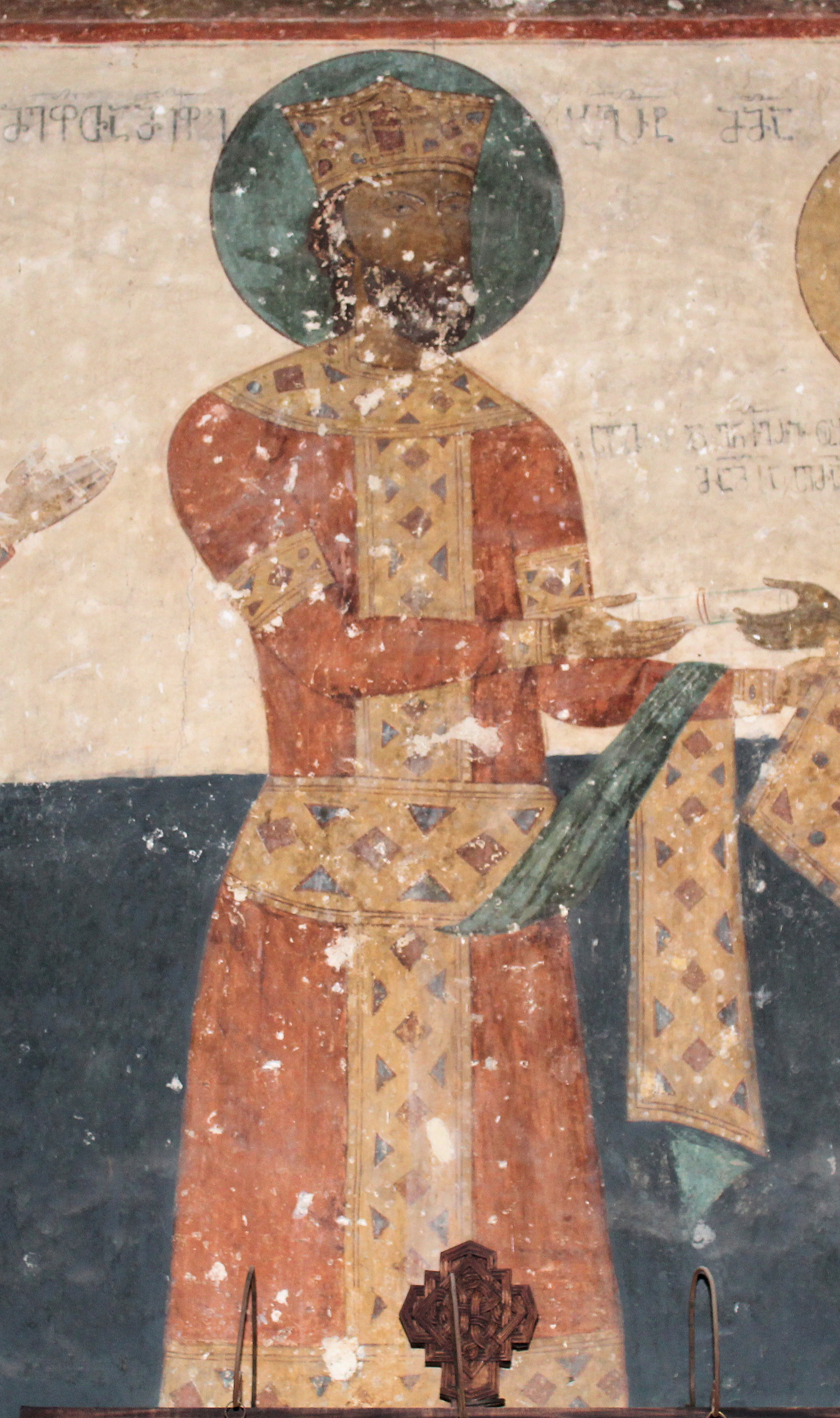
Mural painting of Bagrat III at the Zarzma Monastery in Samtskhe.

In the summer of 1534, the Ottoman Empire launched a campaign against Safavid Persia in an effort to seize control of Shirvan. During his march toward Tabriz, Suleiman the Magnificent crossed through Samtskhe, taking advantage of local unrest to suppress a noble uprising and form an alliance with Prince Qvarqvare III. This development compelled Bagrat III to mobilize his forces to prevent Ottoman expansion along his borders.

In 1535, Bagrat assembled his army and allied with his vassals from Mingrelia and Guria to invade Samtskhe. On 12 August, his troops approached Akhalkalaki and engaged Qvarqvare III in the Battle of Murjakheti. The prince of Samtskhe was killed, (Note: According to Salia, the prince became a prisoner of the king, but the rest of the historical community agrees that Qvarqvare III died on the battlefield.) and his principality was subsequently annexed by Bagrat III. Qvarqvare’s young son, Kaikhosro, fled to Constantinople. From his newly acquired territories, Bagrat granted Javakheti to Luarsab I in an effort to strengthen relations between the two Georgian kingdoms. Mamia III of Guria received Adjara and Chaneti as rewards for his assistance, while the contribution of Mingrelia went unrewarded.

Despite his victory, Bagrat soon faced Ottoman retaliation. On 4 July 1536, Mehmed Khan, beylerbey of Erzurum, (Note: The Pashalik of Erzurum was established by the Sublime Porte in 1533.) led a counteroffensive into Samtskhe, capturing several Georgian towns in Tao-Klarjeti, including Artvin and Narman. For the first time, the Ottomans annexed Georgian territories, imposing Turkish and Islamic administration on the local Orthodox population—a sign of a new, aggressive Ottoman policy toward Imereti.

Following their invasion, Ottoman troops plundered Georgian churches and villages for several years. In an effort to halt the attacks, Bagrat III sought assistance from Shah Tahmasp I of Persia, offering his submission in exchange for military aid in Samtskhe. Although the Shah declined, he sent generous gifts to the King of Imereti. In 1543, Ottoman general Musa Pasha returned to Samtskhe with an army of sixty nobles and 22,000 soldiers, forcing Bagrat to capitulate after bombarding defenseless villages with cannons. Bagrat offered tributes and the keys to Oltu, after which the Ottomans withdrew, leaving behind a garrison and one cannon.

Bagrat III quickly broke the truce, retook Oltu, and seized the Ottoman cannon. Reinforced by troops from Guria, he pursued the Ottoman forces and defeated them at Karagak, where Musa Pasha was killed.

In the summer of 1545, the Ottoman Empire launched a large-scale invasion of Imereti to avenge the defeat at Karagak. The campaign was led by the governors of Erzurum and Diyarbekir. Bagrat once again called upon his allies, but Levan I of Mingrelia refused to participate, angered by the lack of rewards after his earlier support at Murjakheti. Bagrat, together with Luarsab of Kartli and Mamia of Guria, faced the Ottoman army near the village of Sokhoista, where they were ultimately defeated following the betrayal of Samtskhe’s Georgian soldiers, who had been denied their traditional right to lead the attack.

Bagrat III consequently lost control over Samtskhe, which the Ottomans granted to Kaikhosro Jaqeli. The king made several attempts to reclaim the region but was defeated in 1546[6] and again in 1553, during a campaign in which he recovered the Icon of the Virgin of Atsquri, later transferred to Kutaisi. He also sought assistance from European powers, though his only recorded Western contact was a letter from Pope Paul III to Luarsab of Kartli, commending both Georgian rulers for their resistance against the Muslims and promising the dispatch of Catholic envoys to Georgia.

The loss of Samtskhe under Bagrat III led to the gradual Islamization of the region. By the 17th century, local princes had lost their autonomy and adopted the Ottoman title of “Pasha of Akhalkalaki” In the 18th century, Samtskhe was fully incorporated into the Ottoman Empire.

=== Revolt of the Nobles ===
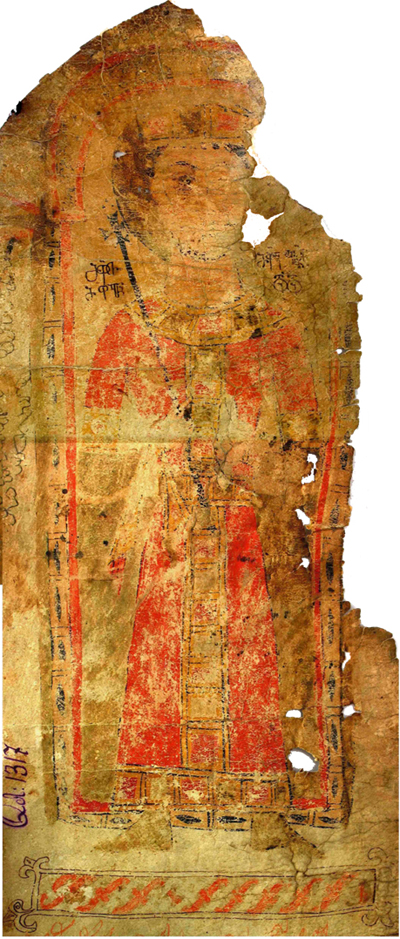
A blood money charter of King Bagrat III to the noble family of Shergiladze

Following the loss of Samtskhe, Bagrat III recognized that victory over the Ottoman Empire could only be achieved through the complete unification of Western Georgia. Determined to suppress the insubordination of his vassals, he began consolidating his authority. In 1546, Bagrat invited Levan I Dadiani, Prince of Mingrelia, to Khoni under the pretense of a peace conference held during the hunting season. After feasting together, Bagrat had Levan arrested and imprisoned in the bell tower of the Gelati Monastery, subsequently attempting to annex Mingrelia. He then appealed to Rostom of Guria to join him in dividing Dadiani’s domains.

Suspicious of the king’s motives, Rostom refused the offer and demanded Levan’s release. Meanwhile, Kaikhosro Jaqeli, the atabeg of Samtskhe, bribed Khophilandre Chkheidze, one of Bagrat’s royal advisers, to free Dadiani and escort him to Akhaltsikhe. With Rostom’s assistance, Levan returned to his capital, Zugdidi, and regained control over his principality. Shortly thereafter, Levan declared Mingrelia’s independence from Imereti and accepted the Ottoman Empire’s suzerainty over his territory.

In 1549, the Ottomans invaded Georgia once again, seizing Chaneti and Adjara, both under the control of the Principality of Guria. Rostom appealed to Bagrat III and Levan Dadiani for military support, prompting the King of Imereti to send a detachment of 500 men under the command of his brother, Vakhtang. Secretly, Bagrat ordered Vakhtang to prevent any military alliance between Mingrelia and Guria. Following these instructions, Vakhtang convinced the Mingrelian troops to withdraw, allowing the Ottomans to capture and annex Gonio and Batumi. For the next fifty years, Batumi became the focal point of repeated battles between Guria and the Ottoman Empire.

In the aftermath of this failure—and angered by Bagrat III’s duplicity—Rostom of Guria also declared independence from Imereti. This further weakened Kutaisi’s political and military power, reducing Bagrat’s realm to the weakest of the three Georgian kingdoms. By 1553, both Levan Dadiani and Rostom of Guria were found in the personal entourage of the Ottoman Pasha of Erzurum.

=== End of Reign ===
In August 1549, the French ambassador to Constantinople, Gabriel de Luetz, Baron d’Aramon, led a Turkish expedition into Imereti, destroying twenty-five fortresses in the Vani region within a week. This operation significantly weakened Imereti. The baron had been instructed to assist the Ottomans in the Caucasus as part of France’s diplomatic agreement with Ottomans in exchange for Ottoman support against the Habsburgs of Austria.

On 29 May 1555, the Ottoman Empire and Persia concluded the Peace of Amasya, formally dividing South Caucasus into their respective spheres of influence. Without his consent, Bagrat III found himself placed under Ottoman influence—a diplomatic setback for the king, who had long sought to maintain stability in his realm by balancing the rivalry between the two Muslim empires. Shortly thereafter, Suleiman the Magnificent imposed heavy taxes on Imereti and derisively referred to the country as “Bare-Headed”, symbolizing the devastation wrought by the Ottoman invasions.

Weakened and deprived of external military support, Bagrat attempted to invade Surami, located in Kartli within the Safavid sphere, in an effort to undermine the Peace of Amasya. The campaign, however, failed, forcing the king to abandon his final military ambitions.

Bagrat III died in 1565, after a reign of fifty-five years. He was buried in the Gelati Monastery, which he had rebuilt early in his reign. His eldest son, George II, succeeded him as King of Imereti.

== Family ==
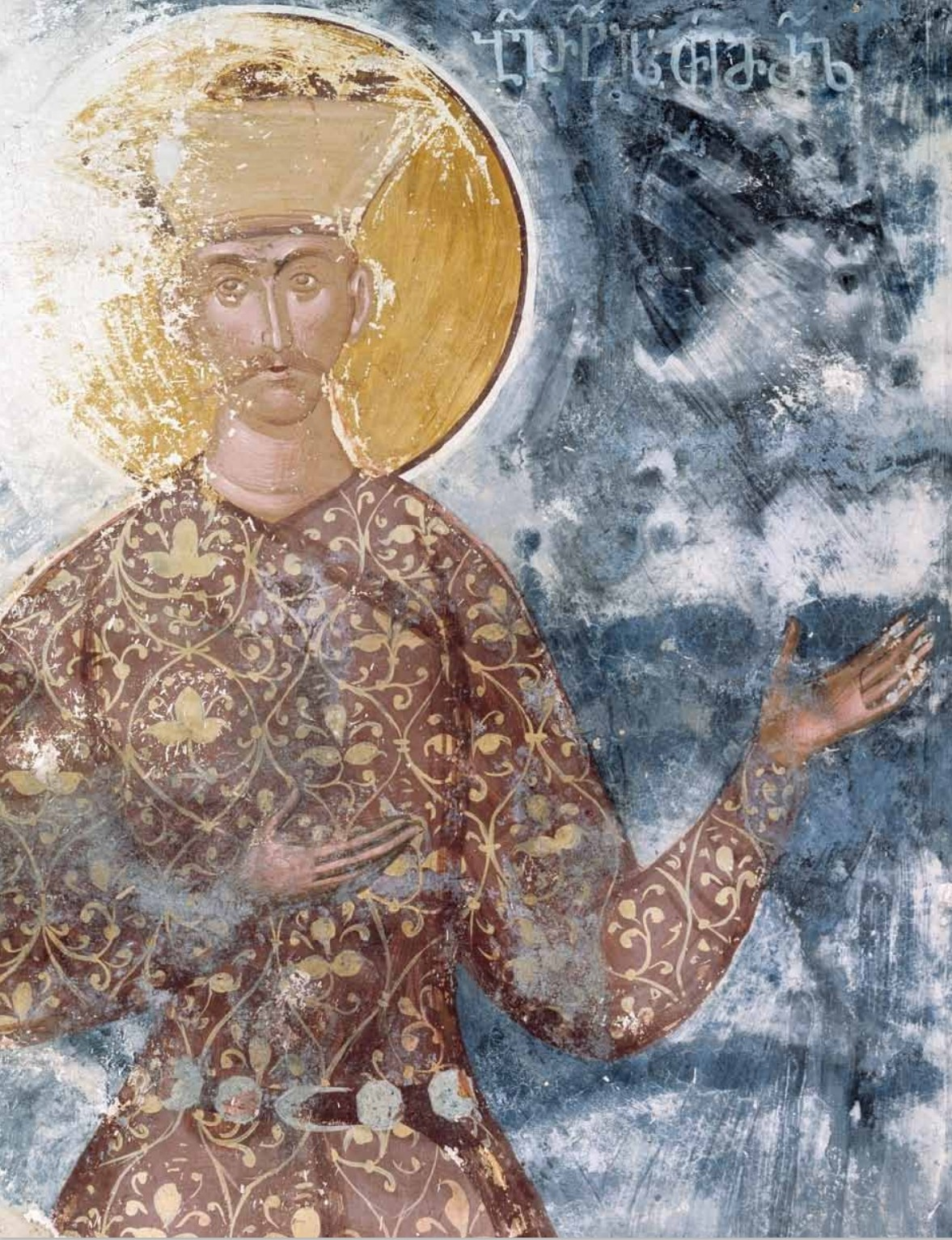
Teimuraz, son of Bagrat III and probably the father of Bagrat IV of Imereti.

Bagrat was married to a certain Helen (fl. 1514–1565). Their children were:

- George II of Imereti (died 1585), King of Imereti (r. 1565–1585);
- Prince Teimuraz (fl. 1514–1583), father of Bagrat IV of Imereti;
- Prince Vakhtang (fl. 1520–1565);
- Prince Constantine (died 1587), a claimant to the Imeretian throne and father of Rostom of Imereti and George III of Imereti;
- Princess Tamar (died 1556), who married Luarsab I;
- An unnamed daughter, who married Ramaz Bagration-Davitishvili.

== Legacy ==
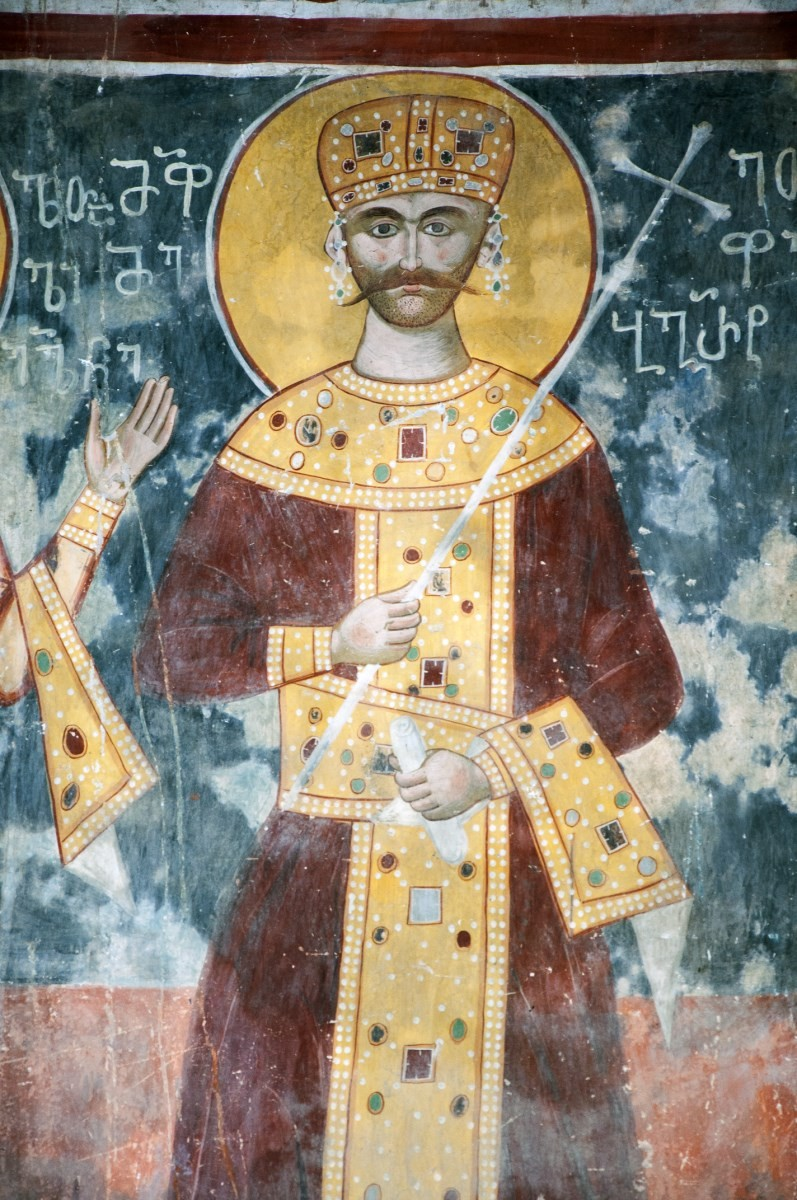
King Bagrat III, a fresco from the Gelati Monastery.

Bagrat III ruled during one of the most turbulent periods in Georgian history. While medieval Georgia had once flourished as a unified and powerful kingdom during its golden age, the first half of the 16th century marked the beginning of its national fragmentation. The country was divided into rival kingdoms, local vassals rebelled against their suzerains, and the Muslim empires—primarily the Ottomans and the Safavids—repeatedly invaded Imereti. Despite these difficulties, Bagrat III managed to strengthen and promote the Georgian Orthodox faith throughout his realm.

In 1512, he undertook the reconstruction of the Gelati Monastery, one of Georgia’s most significant religious and cultural centers. In 1529, he reorganized the structure of the Catholicate of Abkhazia, establishing the bishoprics of Gelati and Khoni. Later, in 1534, he rebuilt the Cathedral of Nikortsminda, designating it as the seat of another episcopate. These efforts reflected his commitment to restoring ecclesiastical authority and preserving Georgia’s spiritual heritage amid political instability.

Economically, however, Imereti remained impoverished. According to historian Nodar Asatiani, Bagrat’s reign coincided with the introduction of several new taxes on wine, wheat, and livestock—imposed both by the Crown and the Church. The royal court became increasingly unpopular as Bagrat refused to curb the oppression of minor nobles, while the agricultural economy collapsed under the combined effects of Ottoman raids and the slave trade, which devastated the rural population.

Following Bagrat III’s reign, Imereti experienced a severe population decline, as many inhabitants migrated to Abkhazia and the mountainous regions of the Caucasus, where royal and Ottoman influence gradually faded. Despite the hardships of his era, Bagrat III remains remembered as a defender of Orthodoxy and a monarch who sought to preserve Georgian identity during a period of profound disunity and external threat.

== In popular culture ==
In 2015, the American television series Reign: The Destiny of a Queen portrayed a young King of Imereti, aged fifteen, whose father dies at the beginning of the 16th century, compelling him to return to his homeland to be crowned. The character is widely believed to be inspired by Bagrat III, who likewise ascended the throne of Imereti at the age of fifteen. The role of the young king is played by Charles Vandervaart.

== Bibliography ==
- Asatiani, Nodar; Bendianashvili, Alexandre (1997). Histoire de la Géorgie. Paris: L'Harmattan. ISBN 2-7384-6186-7.
- Asatiani, Nodar (2008). Საქართველოს ისტორია II [History of Georgia, Volume 2] (in Georgian). Tbilisi: Tbilisi University Press. ISBN 978-9941-13-004-5.
- Asatiani, Nodar; Janelidze, Otar (2009). History of Georgia. Tbilisi: Publishing House Petite. ISBN 978-9941-9063-6-7.
- Brosset, Marie-Félicité (1830). Chronique géorgienne (in French). Paris: de l'Imprimerie Royale.
- Brosset, Marie-Félicité (1843). "Essai chronologique sur la série des catholicos d'Aphkhazeth". Bulletin de la classe des sciences historiques, philologiques et politiques de l'Académie Impériale des Sciences de Saint-Pétersbourg (in French). I (20/21): 305–324.
- Brosset, Marie-Félicité (1851). Additions et éclaircissements à l'histoire de la Géorgie depuis l'Antiquité jusqu'en 1469 de J.-C [Additions and clarifications to the history of Georgia from Antiquity to AD 1469] (in French). St.-Petersbourg: Imprimerie de l'Académie Impériale des Sciences.
- Brosset, Marie-Félicité (1856). Histoire de la Géorgie de l'Antiquité jusqu'au xixe siècle, " Histoire moderne " [History of Georgia from Ancient Times to the 19th Century, Modern History] (in French). Saint-Petersburg: Imperial Academy of Sciences.
- Mgaloblishvili, Tamila (1998). Ancient Christianity In The Caucasus. Psychology Press. ISBN 978-0-7007-0633-4.
- Parry, Vernon J.; Cook, M. A. (1976). A History of the Ottoman Empire to 1730: Chapters from the Cambridge History of Islam and the New Cambridge Modern History. CUP Archive. ISBN 978-0-521-09991-2.
- Rayfield, Donald (2012). Edge of Empires, a History of Georgia. London: Reaktion Books. ISBN 978-1-78023-070-2.
- Salia, Kalistrat (1980). Histoire de la nation géorgienne [History of the Georgian nation] (in French). Paris: Nino Salia.

Preceded by Alexander II	King of Imereti; 1510–1565	Succeeded by George II
