= Prince Gocha of Kartli =

Gocha (Georgian: გოჩა ბატონიშვილი, romanized: gocha bat'onishvili; died 1599) was a Georgian royal prince (batonishvili) of the Bagrationi dynasty of Kartli.

== Biography ==
Gocha was the son of George (fl. 1547–1560), the grandson of Alexander (fl. 1526–1556), and the great-grandson of King Constantine II of Georgia. He was a military commander and companion-in-arms of King Simon I of Kartli, serving as commander of the army's vanguard. Gocha distinguished himself in the fighting to expel the Ottoman forces from Gori in 1598–1599, during which he was killed.

Gocha's descendants later adopted the surname Gochashvili. His son, George, participated in a conspiracy against King Rostom in an attempt to seize the throne of Kartli, but was defeated, blinded, and killed. His grandson, Ioram, later likewise attempted to claim the kingship. He was defeated by Vakhtang V, who blinded him and confiscated the family's estates.
