= Manuchar I Jaqeli =

Atabeg of Samtskhe
- Reign: 1515–1518
- Predecessor: Mzetchabuki
- Successor: Qvarqvare III
- Born: 1452
- Died: after 1518
- Dynasty: Jaqeli
- Father: Qvarqvare II Jaqeli
- Religion: Orthodox Christianity

Manuchar I Jaqeli (Georgian: მანუჩარ I ჯაყელი) (1452 – died after 1518) was a Prince and Atabeg of Samtskhe-Saatabago from 1515 to 1518. He was a member of the Jaqeli family and youngest son of Qvarqvare II Jaqeli. After his older brother Mzetchabuk's abdication Manuchar started an uprising against his nephew Qvarqvare, the son of Kaikhosro I. Manuchar's revolt finished successfully and he ascended to the Meskhetian throne. During his brief reign Manuchar sent many gifts to the Ottoman sultan Selim I and claimed himself as an admirer of Ottomans. In 1518 the new revolt started. Prince Qvarqvare with the help of Safavid troops attacked Samtskhe. Manuchar was overthrown and Qvarqvare became the new ruler of Meskheti. After this Manuchar asked his suzerain Sultan Selim for help. Sultan gave him the huge army. He had tried to restore himself as Atabeg, but was defeated by Qvarqvare's forces at the battle near Erzurum. Manuchar Jaqeli escaped to the Ottoman Empire and lived there until his death. Nothing is known about his later life and descendants.

Manuchar I Jaqeli Jaqeli
Preceded by Mzetchabuki	Prince of Meskheti; 1515-1518	Succeeded by Qvarqvare III
