= Battle of Gopanto =

Date	1588
Location	Near Gopanto, Imereti
Result	Kartlian victory

Belligerents
Kingdom of Imereti	Kingdom of Kartli

Commanders and leaders
Levan of Imereti	Simon I of Kartli

The Battle of Gopanto (Georgian: გოფანთოს ბრძოლა) took place in 1588 between the forces of King Simon I of Kartli and King Levan of Imereti near the village of Gopanto.

== Battle ==
In the 16th century, the western Georgian kingdom of Imereti was weakened by internecine struggles among its nobility, while Simon I of Kartli sought to consolidate Georgian resistance against the Ottoman Empire. Taking advantage of the political fragmentation in Imereti, Simon—supported by certain Imeretian nobles—launched a campaign into western Georgia. The opposing armies met near the village of Gopanto, where Simon’s forces decisively defeated Levan’s army.

Following the victory, Simon captured Kutaisi, the Imeretian capital, and proclaimed the union of the kingdoms of Kartli and Imereti under his rule. However, his control proved temporary. Pressed by renewed Ottoman threats to Kartli, Simon soon withdrew eastward, allowing Levan to return from his refuge in Lechkhumi and reclaim his throne.

Levan’s restoration was brief. In 1590, Mamia IV Dadiani, prince of Mingrelia, turned against him, captured Kutaisi, and imprisoned Levan in Shkhepi Castle, where he later died. The short-lived union of Kartli and Imereti thus collapsed, and Simon’s western campaign ultimately failed to achieve lasting unification of the Georgian realms.

== Bibliography ==
- Rayfield, Donald (2012). Edge of Empires, a History of Georgia. London: Reaktion Books. ISBN 978-1-78023-070-2.
- Mikaberidze, Alexander (2015). Historical Dictionary of Georgia (e ed.). Rowman & Littlefield. ISBN 978-1442241466.
