= Kvabi, Şenkaya =

Kvabi or Gobi (Georgian: ქვაბი or გობი) is one of the villages in the historical Tao region. Today, it lies within the boundaries of the Timurkışla neighbourhood, which is part of the Şenkaya district in the province of Erzurum in Turkey. The names Kvabi or Gobi have taken the form Kob and Kop in Turkish.

== History ==
The Tao region, where the village of Kvabi is located, was one of the places that made up historical Georgia. This settlement was an important centre and was home to the palace of Mzetchabuki (1445-1516) from the Jakeli dynasty. The Ottomans seized this region from the Georgians following their 1549 campaign in Georgia.

Kvabi was listed in the Ottoman land-survey register (mufassal defter) of 1574 as one of the villages in the Kop district (nahiye) of the Oltu province (liva). There were 45 households in the village. Nine of these households were Muslim. The Kop district consisted of 23 villages; however, more than half of them, namely 14 villages, had been abandoned when they came under Ottoman rule.

Kvabi was recorded as ‘Kob’ or ‘Gob’ (قوب) in the 1595 Ottoman land-survey register (mufassal defter). At that time, this settlement was affiliated with the Penek district (nahiye) of the Penek province (liva). Sergi Jikia, the Georgian Turkologist who published this register, wrote that this place name could be the Georgian ‘Gobi’ (გობი). At that time, the village's population consisted of 40 Christian households. Wheat and barley farming and beekeeping were practised in the village, and sheep and pigs were raised. There was one water mill.

Kvabi is also recorded as ‘Kob’ or ‘Gob’ (قوب) in the Ottoman tax register covering the period 1694-1732 in the Province of Çıldır (Çıldır Eyaleti). In this register, the village, which had the same administrative status, was first left to Kenan with a yield of 3,000 akçe in Hijri 1134 (1721/1722), then to a person named Hüsrev (son of Abdullah) with a yield of 4,000 akçe. Kvabi or Kob did not appear as a village in later records, but became a neighbourhood of the village of Timurkışla under the name ‘Kop’.

During the Georgian rule, Kvabi or Gobi village was an important settlement. In addition to the Kvabi Palace, which housed a church with Georgian inscriptions, a castle and a cave were also identified. Kvabi Castle is located 1 kilometre north of the Kvabi, on a rock with a large cave. It is clear from the remains at the bottom that the castle, which is largely destroyed, was surrounded by walls. At the top of the castle, there are cisterns and a few rooms left. In the difficult-to-reach northern part of the castle, there is a church leaning against the rock. The path leading to the church has collapsed. Kvabi Cave is located 1 kilometre southeast of Kop neighbourhood. It is a large cave with wall remains at the bottom. It is thought that this cave was used as a shelter during attacks from outside.
