= Battle of Garisi =

Battle between Georgian and Iranian kingdoms

Coordinates: 41°33′N 44°28′E

- Part of Tahmasp I's Kakhetian and Kartlian campaigns
Date	1556
Location	Garisi (present-day Tetritsqaro)
Result	Georgian victory

Belligerents
Kingdom of Kartli	Safavid Empire

Commanders and leaders
Luarsab I †; Prince Simon	Shahverdi Sultan †

Strength
6,000	25,000

Casualties and losses
3,000 killed or wounded	10,000+ killed or wounded

The Battle of Garisi (Georgian: გარისის ბრძოლა) was fought between the Georgian and Safavid Iranian armies at the village of Garisi (present-day Tetritsqaro) in 1556, and resulted in a stalemate between both sides.

This conflict was an immediate consequence of the Treaty of Amasya signed between the Ottoman and Safavid empires in 1555. This peace deal left a fragmentized Kingdom of Georgia divided into spheres of influence. The kingdoms of Kartli and Kakheti, and the eastern part of the principality of Samtskhe, were allotted to the Safavids which had already garrisoned the Georgian capital of Tbilisi.

Luarsab I, the indomitable king of Kartli, refused to recognize the terms of the Amasya treaty and continued to worry Tbilisi. This provoked another Iranian expedition, the fourth in Luarsab's reign. The Safavid forces, the Qizilbash, placed by Shah Tahmasp I under the command of Shāhverdī Khān Ziyādoghlū Qājār, beylerbey of Karabakh, crossed into Kartli in 1556. Luarsab and his son Simon met the invaders at Garisi. In a pitched battle, the Georgians managed to beat off the Qizilbash, but Luarsab was killed in action.
