= Princess Helen of Kartli =

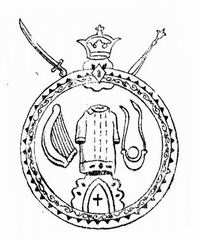
Karli Coat of arms

Helen (Georgian: ელენე, romanized: elene) (born 1591) was a Georgian royal princess (batonishvili) of the Bagrationi dynasty of Kartli branch.

== Biography ==
She was a daughter of King George X of Kartli and Tamar Lipartiani.

Princess Elene was affianced to Tsar Feodor II of Russia. In "Istoria Gosudarstva Rossiyskogo" by Nikolay Karamzin she is described by Russian prince Mikhail Tatishev as:

I saw Elena in a tent of the Queen. She sat between her mother and grandmother on the golden carpet and had pearl headwear, in a velvet dress with lace, with hat decorated with precious stones. Father told her to stand up, take off the robe and the hat. Elena is charming. White, her eyes are black, with small nose, her hair is dyed, pitched straight, but too thin for her age as she is only 10 years old, and her face was not quite complete.

King George X of Kartli gave the oath, but the princess stayed in Georgia until the next Russian visit, by which time Feodor II was no longer alive. The later fate of the princess is unknown.
