= Prince Luarsab of Kartli (died 1652) =

Georgian prince (died 1652)

Prince Luarsab

Heir apparent of Kartli
- Reign: 1639–1652
- Monarch: Rostom
- Died: 1652
- Spouse: Tamar Andronikashvili
- Issue: Prince George
- Dynasty: Bagrationi
- Father: Prince Teimuraz-Mirza of Kartli
- Mother: Daughter of David Bagration-Davitishvili
- Religion: Shia Islam

Luarsab (Georgian: ლუარსაბი, romanized: luarsabi, died 1652) was a member of the Bagrationi dynasty of Kartli, a great-grandson of King Luarsab I and relative of the childless King Rostom, who adopted him and made him heir apparent in 1639. Luarsab also married Rostom's niece by whom he had a son. Luarsab was killed while on a hunt. A homicide was immediately suspected. The suspect was tried by single combat and wounded, but acquitted by virtue of being a victor in the duel.

== Family background ==
Luarsab was the son of Prince Teimuraz-Mirza (fl. 1600), grandson of Prince Vakhtang, and great-grandson of King Luarsab I. His mother was a daughter of Prince David Bagration-Davitishvili. He had two brothers: Vakhtang and another whose name is unknown. Through his father, Luarsab descended from the Kartlian royal branch of the Bagrationi dynasty, while through his mother he descended from the Kakhetian and Imeretian royal families, making him a scion of all three royal branches of the dynasty. The 18th-century Georgian historian Prince Vakhushti erroneously identified Luarsab as the son of Vakhtang, son of King Simon I of Kartli, and this genealogy was accepted by some modern scholars, including Cyril Toumanoff.

== Biography ==
Luarsab was Muslim, living in Isfahan, the capital of the Iranian Safavids. In 1639, he was adopted and designated as heir apparent to the throne of Kartli by his father’s first cousin, the seasoned king Rostom, who had no children of his own. With the shah's approval, Luarsab was brought in Kartli, but the local nobility resented yet another Persian-educated Bagratid. Luarsab was mortally wounded by a bullet while on a hunt in the Karaia grove and died in the presence of the mourning Rostom. The prince's remains were interred at Ardabil.

Prince Luarsab was married to Tamar, daughter of Prince Adam-Sultan Andronikashvili, member of the shah's elite ghulam guard, by an anonymous princess, half-sister of King Rostom. Although Prince Vakhushti claims that with Luarsab's death "the line of the great king Luarsab became extinct", the prince had a son, George (fl. 1652) and a grandson, Khosro (fl. 1700).

== Aftermath ==
Rostom suspected his heir's death was not an accident and requested an inquiry from Isfahan, but nothing came of this as the shah's government was preoccupied with the war in Kandahar. In the meantime, Prince Shiosh Baratashvili denounced Prince Baindur Tumanishvili as a possible murderer and had him publicly tried by single combat in Tbilisi. Tumanishvili was wounded, but won the duel and was thus acquitted. Baratashvili, also wounded and defeated, was cast in prison by Rostom, but was later pardoned and, the 18th-century Georgian Paris Chronicle says, Prince Luarsab "remained unavenged".

After the loss of his heir, Rostom intended to adopt the late Prince Luarsab's brother Vakhtang and, to the chagrin of many Georgians, give him Luarsab's widow in marriage. Vakhtang, serving to the shah as a prefect of Qazvin and having the example of his brother before him, was reluctant. Arriving in Isfahan in 1655, Rostom's envoy, Bakhuta, Prince of Mukhrani, found Prince Vakhtang already dead of illness. Within three years, the Prince of Mukhrani would become Rostom's new choice as heir apparent and would succeed him on the throne of Kartli as Vakhtang V.

== Ancestry ==
Ancestors of Prince Luarsab of Kartli (died 1652)

16. David X
8. Luarsab I
17. Tamar Jaqeli
4. Prince Vakhtang of Kartli
18. Bagrat III of Imereti
9. Tamar of Imereti
19. Tamar N.
2. Teimuraz-Mirza of Kartli
5. Tinatin N.
1. Luarsab
24. David Bagration-Davitashvili
12. Ramaz Bagration-Davitashvili
6. Davit Bagration-Davitashvili
26. Bagrat III of Imereti
13. N. of Imereti
27. Elene N.
3. N. Bagration-Davitashvili

== Bibliography ==
- Toumanoff, Cyril (1976). Manuel de Généalogie et de Chronologie pour l'histoire de la Caucasie chrétienne (Arménie, Géorgie, Albanie) [Manual of Genealogy and Chronology of Christian Caucasian History (Armenia, Georgia, Albania)] (in French). Rome: Edizioni Aquila.
