= Prince Ramaz of Kartli =

Ramaz (Georgian: რამაზი) (fl. 1512–1580) was a Georgian royal prince (batonishvili) of the Bagrationi dynasty.

Ramaz was a son of King David X of Kartli and Princess Tamar Jaqeli (died 1554).

He married certain Khvaramze (fl. 1551) and had 2 sons, Constantine and Bagrat.

Ramaz was an envoy to Shah Ismail I in 1519.
