= Battle of Digomi =

1567 battle to liberate Tbilisi from Perisans

- Part of Georgian–Safavid wars
Date	1567
Location	Near Digomi, Tbilisi 41°46′00″N 44°44′00″E
Result	Georgian victory

Belligerents
Kingdom of Kartli	Safavid Empire

Commanders and leaders
Simon I of Kartli	Daud Khan

Casualties and losses
Unknown	2,000 killed

The Battle of Digomi (Georgian: დიღმის ბრძოლა) was part of a campaign launched by the Georgian king Simon I of Kartli aimed at the liberation of the capital Tbilisi from the Persians in 1567. The battle ended with the Simon's victory.

== Battle ==
King Simon's troops encamped at Digomi plain near Tbilisi and began preparations for a siege. The city was defended by Daut Khan, a Georgian ruler appointed by the Safavid Shah Tahmasp I. Daut Khan attempted to make a sortie with his Persian force, but was routed by Simon's cavalry and found shelter within the walls of Tbilisi Fortress. The Kartlian troops invested the fortress, but could not take it and the campaign ended unsuccessfully. The fortress remained under Persian hands.

== See also ==
- Safavid Empire
- List of Georgian battles
- History of Georgia

== Sources ==
- Rayfield, Donald (2012). Edge of Empires, a History of Georgia. London: Reaktion Books. ISBN 978-1-78023-070-2.
