= George III Dadiani =

Prince of Mingrelia

Prince of Mingrelia
- 1st reign: 1572–1573
- Predecessor: Levan I Dadiani
- Successor: Mamia IV Dadiani
- 2nd reign: 1578–1582
- Predecessor: Mamia IV Dadiani
- Successor: Mamia IV Dadiani
- Died: 1582
- Spouse: 1) Daughter of Rostom Gurieli; 2) Circassian princess 3) Tamar Sharvashidze
- Issue: Levan
- House: Dadiani
- Father: Levan I Dadiani
- Religion: Georgian Orthodox Church (Catholicate of Abkhazia)

George III Dadiani (Georgian: გიორგი III დადიანი, romanized: giorgi III dadiani; died 1582) of the House of Dadiani, was Prince of Mingrelia from 1572 to 1573 and again from 1578 until his death in 1582.

George Dadiani's hold of power in Mingrelia, one of those states that had emerged after the disintegration of the Kingdom of Georgia in the 15th century, was challenged by the neighboring ruler, George II Gurieli, Prince of Guria, and his own younger brother, Mamia IV. In 1573, they succeeded in ousting George, who was only able to resume the throne through the intercession of King George II of Imereti and at the price of territorial and financial concessions in 1578. Thenceforth, Mingrelia experienced a relative peace until George's death in 1582.

The historian Cyril Toumanoff, frequently cited in modern Western literature, disagreed with this traditional chronology, established by the early 18th-century scholar Prince Vakhushti, and dated George's rule to the years 1546–1574 and 1574–1582.

== Career ==
=== Accession and deposition ===
George Dadiani succeeded his father, Levan I Dadiani, as Prince of Mingrelia, on his death in 1572, according to Prince Vakhushti, or on his deposition in 1546, according to Toumanoff. George's rule was dominated by complex relations with the neighboring Georgian dynasts, particularly, the king of Imereti, his nominal suzerain, and the prince of Guria. Shortly after George III's accession to Mingrelia, King George II of Imereti arranged a marriage of his heir Bagrat with Dadiani's sister. The ruler of Guria, George II Gurieli, seeing in this alliance a danger to his own security, effected a rapprochement with Dadiani's younger brother Mamia, whom he gave his sister in marriage. Gurieli then invaded Mingrelia, defeated Dadiani at Zugdidi, and installed Mamia in his stead, forcing George Dadiani into flight to Abkhazia and frustrating his subsequent attempt to regain power with the help of the Abkhazians and Circassians.

=== Restoration ===
While George Dadiani resided in exile, Gurieli succeeded in securing Mamia's recognition from the king of Imereti, but Mingrelia had to cede to the crown the former estates of the Chiladze noble family, which had been acquired by Levan I Dadiani. In despair, George Dadiani approached the king of Imereti, who helped to stuck, in 1578 (according to Prince Vakhushti), a deal: the deposed Dadiani was allowed to resume his reign and he had to pay an indemnity to Gurieli for the past offences such as his abandonment of his first wife, Gurieli's sister. As George Dadiani was short of money, he had to surrender to Gurieli Khobi until the due amount of gold was extracted in full from that town. Mamia Dadiani was to be compensated with the former fief of the Chiladze, known as Sachilao. To cement the peace, the king of Imereti acceded to George Dadiani's request and gave him in marriage a sister of his wife.

=== Last years ===
For a few years, peace reigned in Mingrelia, but, c. 1580, George Dadiani's uncle Batulia, the lord of Sajavakho, whom the Mingrelian ruler had earlier humiliated by taking his wife, plotted a revolt. Dadiani mobilized his loyal forces in time; Batulia had to flee to Guria. In exchange of capturing the rebel, Gurieli took Sajavkho for himself and then allowed Dadiani's agents to kill Batulia in a prison in Ozurgeti.

Close to the end of his reign, in 1581, George Dadiani, together with Gurieli, accompanied the king of Imereti, who, at the order of the Ottoman sultan, made a raid in eastern Georgia, in Inner Kartli. They found the locals in flight, burned down the emptied villages, and returned with no losses.

After George Dadiani died in 1582, the princely throne was taken over by his brother Mamia IV Dadiani, who induced Gurieli to capture and incarcerate his underage nephew Levan and then used the boy's death in a defenestration accident as a pretext to attack Guria.

== Family ==
George III Dadiani was married three times. His first wife was a daughter of Rostom Gurieli, Prince of Guria, whom he divorced in 1564 and took the wife of his own uncle Batulia, a Circassian princess. His third wife was Tamar, from the Abkhazian princely house of Sharvashidze, a sister-in-law of George II of Imereti. George had the only son Levan (1577–1582). He might also had a daughter, Ana, who was married to George Lipartiani, lord of Salipartiano.

George III Dadiani House of Dadiani Born: ? Died: 1582
Regnal titles
Preceded by Levan I Dadiani	Prince of Mingrelia; 1572–1573	Succeeded by Mamia IV Dadiani
Preceded by Mamia IV Dadiani	Prince of Mingrelia; 1578–1582	Succeeded by Mamia IV Dadiani
