= Prince Khosro of Imereti =

Khosro (Georgian: ხოსრო; fl. 1568–1570) was a Georgian prince of the Bagrationi dynasty of the Kingdom of Imereti, who led an abortive revolt against King George II of Imereti in 1568.

== Family background ==
The 18th-century Georgian historian Prince Vakhushti makes Khosro a grandson of Prince Vakhtang of Imereti, a version followed by the latter-day scholars such as Marie-Félicité Brosset and Cyril Toumanoff. More recent genealogy, currently established in Georgia and based on the identification of Khosro as a cousin of George II in a contemporary document, considers Khosro as a son, not a grandson, of Prince Vakhtang. Khosro appears to have had a daughter, unknown by the name, who was married to Prince Constantine, a grandson of King Constantine II of Georgia.

== Biography ==
In 1568, Khosro led a revolt of the Imeretian nobles against King George II. A major driving force behind the rebellion was Levan I Dadiani, Prince of Mingrelia, who made common cause with the Imeretian opposition. George was betrayed by one of his men and Khosro and Varaz Chiladze led the rebels in a "treacherous" attack on the king at Ianeti. George won, however, forcing the rebels into flight. Dadiani escaped to the Ottoman Empire, while Chiladze was killed at the king's behest. Prince Khosro went in obscurity. He might have been the certain Khosro, whose palace in Khoni was granted by King George II to Prince Tsulukidze in a charter issued in 1570.
