= George Lipartiani =

Georgian regent (ruled 1611–1616)

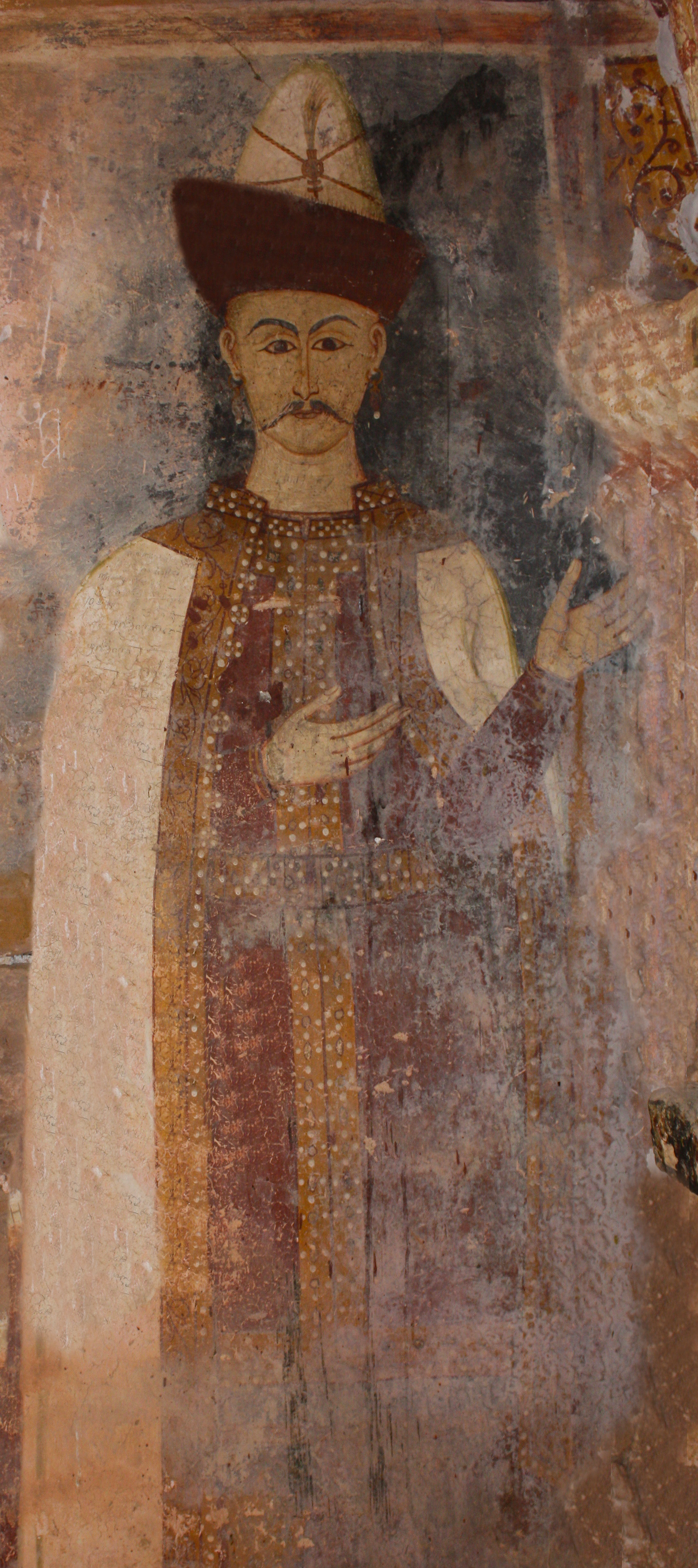
- Fresco of George Lipartiani from the Tsalenjikha Cathedral.

Regent of Mingrelia
- Regency: 1611–1616
- Prince: Levan II Dadiani
- Spouse: Ana Dadiani; Darejan Chiladze
- Issue: Vameq III Dadiani
- House: Dadiani
- Father: Levan I Dadiani
- Religion: Georgian Orthodox Church (Catholicate of Abkhazia)

George Lipartiani (Georgian: გიორგი ლიპარტიანი, romanized: giorgi lip'art'iani) was regent of the Principality of Mingrelia from 1611 to 1616 during the minority of his nephew, Levan II Dadiani. As ruler of the Lipartiani fiefdom and a high-ranking official of the principality, he held the title of Lipartiani. He remained active in the principality's affairs after his regency and was regarded as a capable administrator.
