= Prince Vakhtang of Imereti =

Vakhtang
- Died: After 1548
- Spouse: Princess Khvaramze of Kakheti (died 1528)
- Issue: Prince Teimuraz; Prince Khosro
- Dynasty: Bagrationi
- Father: Alexander II of Imereti
- Mother: Tamar
- Religion: Georgian Orthodox Church (Catholicate of Abkhazia)

Vakhtang (Georgian: ვახტანგი; fl. 1512–1548) was a Georgian prince of the Bagrationi dynasty of the Kingdom of Imereti, a younger son of King Alexander II of Imereti.

== Biography ==
Vakhtang was in opposition to his elder brother, King Bagrat III of Imereti and eventually had to flee to the Kingdom of Kartli, followed by many Imeretian noblemen. In 1512, Bagrat with his army crossed into Kartli, attacked Vakhtang at his base in Mokhisi and defeated him. Through the mediation of King David X of Kartli, the brothers reconciled and Vakhtang returned to Imereti.

In the late 1540s, Vakhtang was placed at the head of an Imeretian detachment of 500 men sent by Bagrat in response to the cry for help from Rostom Gurieli, Prince of Guria, who was pressured by the Ottoman advance into his possessions around Batumi. Since Gurieli also appealed for help to Levan I Dadiani, Prince of Mingrelia, Vakhtang received a clandestine instruction from his brother not to allow any accord between Gurieli and Dadiani, who were defiant vassals of the king of Imereti. In the meantime, Gurieli succeeded in rolling back the Ottoman forces beyond the Chorokhi before the reinforcements arrived, but he failed to cross the swollen river, thus losing Gonio and Adjara to the enemy. His hopes that the Mingrelians and Imeretians would eventually come to aid were dashed. Through Vakhtang's intrigues, Dadiani, camping at the mouth of the Rioni at Poti, went back to Mingrelia; Vakhtang too, seeing an untenable situation of Gurieli, returned to Imereti.

== Family ==
Vakhtang was married Princess Khvaramze (died 1528), daughter of George II of Kakheti. He had two sons:

- Prince Teimuraz;
- Prince Khosro (fl. 1568–1570).
