= Qvarqvare III Jaqeli =

Atabeg of Samtskhe
- Reign: 1518–1535
- Predecessor: Manuchar I
- Successor: Kaikhosro II
- Born: 1469
- Died: 1535 (aged 65–66)
- Issue: Beka Jaqeli; Archil Jaqeli; Kaikhosro II Jaqeli
- Dynasty: Jaqeli
- Father: Kaikhosro I Jaqeli
- Religion: Georgian Orthodox Church
- Khelrtva

Qvarqvare III Jaqeli (Georgian: ყვარყვარე III ჯაყელი) (1469–1535) was a Georgian ruling Prince and Atabeg of Samtskhe-Saatabago during 1518–1535. Member of the Jaqeli family and son of Atabeg Kaikhosro I Jaqeli. His failure to capture the throne at the death of his father Kaikhosro may have been caused by the ambition of his uncle Mzetchabuki, who had seized Atabeg's title from him. Despite this Mzetchabuk Jaqeli declared Qvarqare as his successor. During his uncle's reign Qvarqvare actively involved in state affairs. In 1515 ill Mzetchabuk resigned from the throne and came to the Monastery as a monk. Qvarqvare couldn't ascend to the Meskhetian throne, because his second uncle Manuchar I had revolted. Qvarqvare went to Safavid Persia, became vassal of Shah Ismail I and lived at his court in Tabriz until his accession. In 1518 Qvarqvare commanded Qizilbash army and invaded Samtskhe. Persians dethroned Manuchar I and placed Qvarqvare on the throne. Manuchar invited Ottomans to fight against Safavids and overthrow his nephew, but Qvarqvare's forces defeated him at the battle near Erzurum, after which Manuchar escaped to the Ottoman Empire. During Qvarqvare's reign Persian influence on Samtskhe was growing day by day. Because of that Turks greatly damaged the country and especially its southwestern region. Meskhetian lords had recognized that under Qvarqvare's rule Samtskhe would finally turn to the Enemy's hands. They made an alliance with the Georgian kings, Bagrat III of Imereti and Luarsab I to end up Jaqelian rule and protect Samtskhe from dominant Muslim empires (Ottomans and Safavids). In 1535 King Bagrat III invaded Samtskhe. He defeated and captured Qvarqvare III at the Battle of Murjakheti near Akhalkalaki, Georgians had annexed Principality of Samtskhe. Qvarqvare died in prison. A few years later, his survived youngest son Kaikhosro II requested Ottomans to expel Imeretian and Kartlian forces from Samtskhe. In 1545, at the Battle of Sokhoista, Kaikhosro defeated Bagrat III, after which he reinstated his legitimate throne. Samtskhe became vassal of the Ottoman Empire. Qvarqvare III's descendants ruled Samtskhe-Saatabago (until 1628) and then Childir Eyalet until 1820s.

Qvarqvare III Jaqeli Jaqeli
| Preceded by Manuchar I | Prince of Meskheti; 1518-1535 | Succeeded by Kaikhosro II |
