= Gulchara =

Gulchara (Georgian: გულჩარა; fl. 1600–1612) was a Georgian noblewoman from the Kingdom of Kartli, who played a role in the Georgian–Ottoman–Safavid diplomacy in the early 17th century and helped forge a 1612 treaty during the Ottoman–Safavid war (1603–1612).

== Biography ==
Gulchara was close to King Simon I of Kartli. A contemporary Persian historian reports her being a relative of Simon's family, while the Portuguese envoy in Persia, António de Gouveia, claims she was Simon's concubine. Mainstream scholarship in Georgia identifies Gulchara, a name or sobriquet based on Persian Gol-chehra, "rose-faced", as being the same person as Simon's granddaughter and George X's daughter, Tinatin (or Elene), who is known to have visited Simon during his confinement in Constantinople. Present-day historian David Blow presents her as a wife of Simon.

Simon I of Kartli, caught in the Ottoman–Safavid rivalry and anxious to preserve his kingdom's precarious autonomy, ended up as a prisoner of the Yedikule Fortress at Constantinople in 1600. Gulchara, who had once accompanied Simon to the Safavid capital of Isfahan, was brought to Constantinople to care for the aged king. She quickly befriended Sultan Mehmed III's mother and garnered respect and trust at the court, impressing the European diplomats in Constantinople with her "beauty, grandeur, and eloquence". Faced with disaster in the Ottoman–Safavid War, Mehmed's mother decided to approach Shah Abbas I of Persia through the latter's aunt Zeynab Begum (who wielded considerable influence in the Safavid royal court) by using Gulchara as envoy. Mehmed III's mother promised Gulchara, that if she would succeed in her mission, the Ottomans would release "her husband" from captivity. On Gulchara's first mission to meet Shah Abbas, she was allowed to include Simon. But Ahmet's ministers feared Simon might reveal too much to Abbas and Simon was recalled back to Yedikule after seven days' journey into the mission. After several diplomatic trips and the Ottoman military failures, in 1612 a peace party in Constantinople, which included Gulchara, persuaded the sultan to accept peace terms, which recapitulated those of the 1555 Treaty of Amasya. Her efforts were too late for the ailing king Simon, who died at Yedikule at the age of 74 in 1611. Gulchara's subsequent fate is unknown.

== Sources ==
- Blow, David (2009). Shah Abbas: The Ruthless King Who became an Iranian Legend. London, UK: I.B. Tauris & Co. Ltd. ISBN 978-1845119898. LCCN 2009464064.
