= Siege of Gori =

16th century Georgian-Ottoman battle

| Date | 1598–1599 |
| Location | Gori |
| Result | Georgian victory |

Belligerents
| Kingdom of Kartli | Ottoman Empire |

Commanders and leaders
| Simon I of Kartli | Unknown |

The Siege of Gori was a battle between Kingdom of Kartli and the Ottoman Empire at Gori. After the siege, which lasted for nine months, the battle ended with the Georgian victory.

== Background ==
The Ottoman–Safavid War of 1578–1590 saw the Kingdom of Kartli falling under the Ottoman Empire suzerainty as its capital Tbilisi was occupied by the Ottoman soldiers. However, due to the fierce resistance of Simon I of Kartli, he was recognized as a Christian king with full autonomy in exchange for annual tribute.

After unsuccessful interventions in the struggle for Imeretian throne with the aim of unifying Kartli and Imereti, Simon I decided to renew struggle against the Ottoman occupation. Alarmed by the Ottoman gains in the Treaty of Constantinople, the European countries encouraged a broad alliance against the Ottomans, which resulted in them, Kartli, Kakheti, Iran and Russia coming closer politically. New Shah of Persia Abbas was trying to find common language with the Christian countries of Europe through Christian Kings of Kartli and Kakheti. Despite this, no military intervention was foreseeable from the Europeans and Russia, neither did Iran launch the war against the Ottomans. Nevertheless, Simon I decided to renew struggle to liberate his kingdom from Ottomans.

== Siege ==
Gori, the heart of the Kingdom of Kartli, was Simon's first objective before retaking Tbilisi and other fortified towns, as Gori would provide a good stronghold for resisting the enemy. In 1598, Simon I laid siege to Turkish garrison at the fortress of Gori. The garrison soon fell into the state of privation, and they became compelled to obtain their food by force from the neighboring villages. Despite this, they valiantly resisted. In Spring 1599, the Georgians raised the siege during Lent, which was a common practice among Georgians and led Ottomans to believe that the Georgians abandoned their goals. However, this was a trick, and as soon as the Turks relaxed their vigilance, Simon I decided to act. The former mouravi of Gori Sulkhan Turmanidze and tavadi Pharsadan Tsitsishvili had stockpiled the ladders upon King's order, and at agreed signal met at night near Gori, where the rivers of Mtkvari and Liakhvi meet. King Simon I was also there. The joined armies moved unobserved in the darkness, set their ladders against the walls and stormed the citadel of Gori. The army was led by Simon's brother Vakhtang, the vanguard was commanded by Prince Gocha. The fighting continued till down, but ultimately the Turks surrendered the fortress as further resistance was futile. After liberating Gori, Simon began to prepare for retaking Tbilisi, while Ottoman Sultan sent a large army to quell the rebellion.

== See also ==
- Battle of Nakhiduri

== Sources ==
- Rayfield, Donald (2012). Edge of Empires, a History of Georgia. London: Reaktion Books. ISBN 978-1-78023-070-2.
- Salia, Kalistrat (1983). History of the Georgian Nation. Paris.
- Asatiani, Nodar; Janelidze, Otar (2009). History of Georgia: From Ancient Times to the Present Day. Publishing House Petite. ISBN 9789941906367.
- Fähnrich, Heinz (2010). Geschichte Georgiens (in German). Brill Publishers. ISBN 978-9004184503.
