= Zekari Pass =

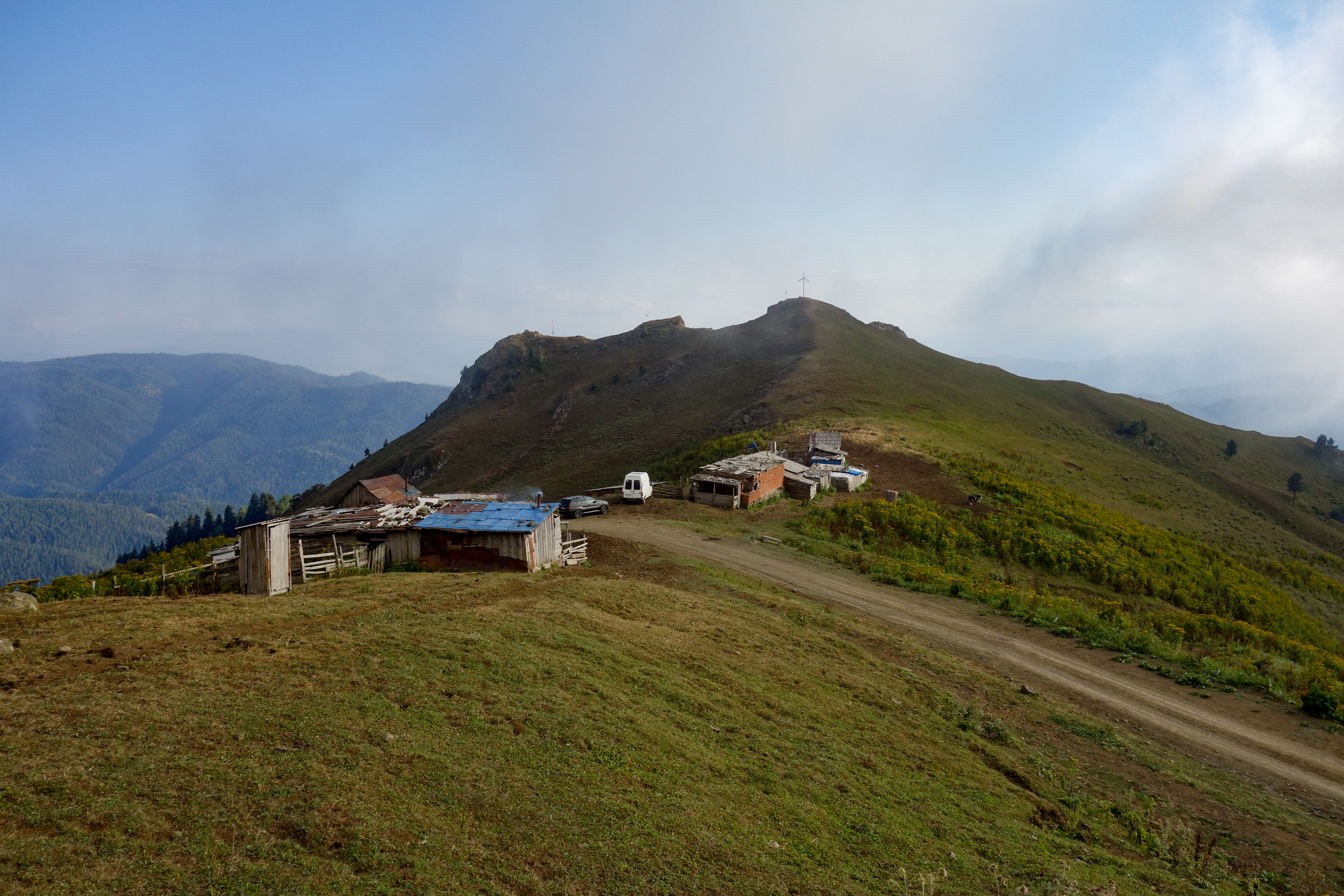
- Zekari Pass

- Location within Caucasus Mountains Location within Georgia
- Interactive map of Zekari Pass
- Elevation: 2,182 metres (7,159 ft)

Third Approach
- Range: Meskheti Range
- Coordinates: 41°49′39″N 42°51′43″E

Zekari Pass (Georgian: ზეკარი, also Zikar Pass in some older texts) is a 2,182-metre-high (7,159 ft) mountain pass located in Georgia's Meskheti Range on the border of the Imereti and Samtskhe-Javakheti regions. Though used as a 'caravan' route since times immemorial, the road across the pass remains unpaved, suitable only for off-road vehicles and is usually impassable from October to June.

== History ==
In August 1893, British parliamentarian and explorer H. F. B. Lynch took this route between Kutais and Akhaltsykh, expounding: "I doubt whether there exists in the nearer Asia a standpoint which commands a prospect at once so grand and so instructive as that which is unfolded from the summit of the Zikar Pass."
