= Levan I Dadiani =

Prince of Mingrelia

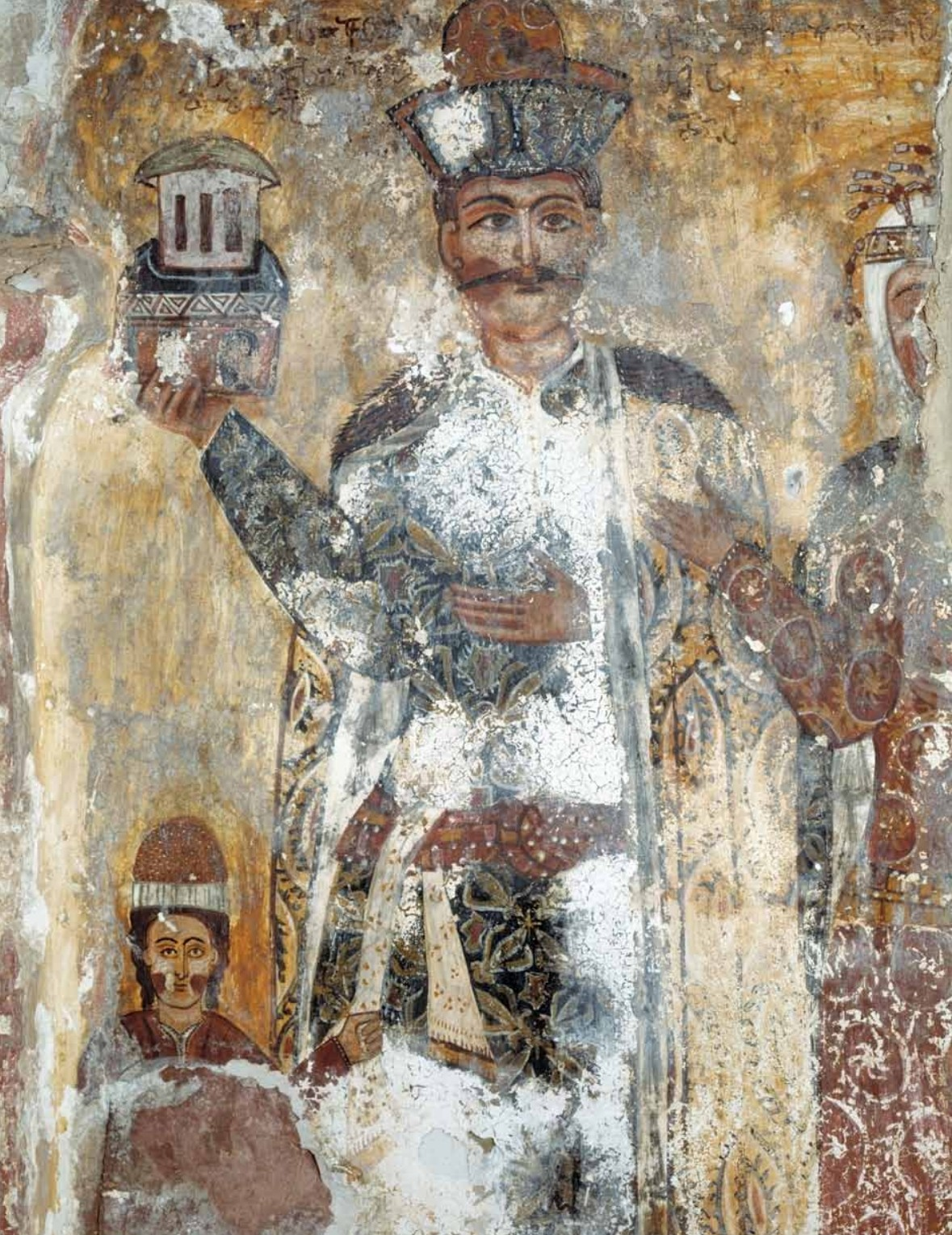
- Levan I Dadiani in a fresco in the Tsalenjikha Cathedral.

Prince of Mingrelia
- Reign: 1533–1572
- Predecessor: Mamia III Dadiani
- Successor: George III Dadiani
- Died: 1572
- Issue Among others: George III Dadiani; Mamia IV Dadiani; Manuchar I Dadiani; George Lipartiani
- Dynasty: Dadiani
- Father: Mamia III Dadiani
- Mother: Elisabed
- Religion: Georgian Orthodox Church (Catholicate of Abkhazia)

Levan I Dadiani (also Leon; Georgian: ლევან [ლეონ] I დადიანი; died 1572) was a member of the House of Dadiani and ruler of the Principality of Mingrelia, western Georgia. He succeeded on the death of his father, Mamia III Dadiani, as eristavi ("duke") of Mingrelia and ex officio mandaturtukhutsesi ("Lord High Steward") of Imereti in 1533. Dadiani's break with the king of Imereti brought about his downfall and imprisonment in 1546. He was able to escape and regain his possessions, securing Ottoman support for his independence from Imereti.

== Accession to power and break with the king of Imereti ==
Levan was a son of Mamia III Dadiani by his wife, Elisabed. He succeeded on Mamia's death in an expedition against the Circassians in 1533. These mountainous tribes from the North Caucasus continued to pose a challenge to Levan, but a more immediate threat to his hold of power came from his overlords, the kings of Imereti, one of the three breakaway kingdoms of medieval Georgia. By the time of Levan's accession to power, the Dadiani had achieved significant autonomy and his contemporary king of Imereti, Bagrat III, was determined to bring the crown's recalcitrant subjects under control. Levan continued to be styled as eristavt-eristavi ("duke") of Mingrelia and mandaturtukhutsesi ("Lord High Steward") of Imereti, but by defying Bagrat's call to arms during a war waged by an alliance of Georgian rulers against the expanding Ottoman Empire in 1545, Levan reneged on his vestigial duties as a vassal to the king.

== Imprisonment and escape ==
Bagrat, defeated by the Ottomans at Sokhoista, avenged Dadiani a year later: he invited Levan to a summit at Khoni, incarcerated him in Gelati's bell-tower, and offered his vassal, Rostom Gurieli of Guria to divide up Mingrelia. Gurieli, wary that he would be the next target of Bagrat's centralizing efforts, declined the offer and advised the king to release Dadiani. Around 1550, another foe of Bagrat, Kaikhosro II Jaqeli, Prince of Samtskhe, bribed the Imeretian nobleman Khopilandre Chkheidze to help Dadiani escape and then persuaded Gurieli to give him a free passage to Mingrelia, where Levan was quickly reinstated.

== Relations with Gurieli ==
Subsequently, Levan rewarded Rostom Gurieli's good services by mobilizing the Mingrelian army in his support against the Ottoman threat, but the intrigues of Bagrat of Imereti's brother, Vakhtang, disrupted the Dadiani-Gurieli accord. The Gurieli family's pride was further wounded when Levan's son, George, dismissed his wife, Rostom Gurieli's daughter, in order to marry a beautiful Circassian wife of his own uncle, Batulia. Levan attempted to restore a matrimonial alliance with the Gurieli by marrying off his daughter to Rostom's son and successor, George II Gurieli, who soon, in his turn, humiliated the Dadiani by divorcing his new Mingrelian wife and marrying a widowed Imeretian princess, an aunt of Bagrat III's son and successor, George II.

== Exile to Constantinople and comeback ==
After Dadiani backed a failed revolt of the Imeretian pretender, Prince Khosro, in 1568, George III of Imereti made a common cause with Gurieli and attacked Mingrelia. Levan was unable to defend himself against the joint invasion, fled to Constantinople and secured the sultan's recognition of his independence from the king of Imereti. Thenceforth, he was to be named as a "sovereign Dadiani" (ხელმწიფე დადიანი). According to the early 18th-century Georgian chronicles written by Beri Egnatashvili and Prince Vakhushti of Kartli—the main sources available for this period of Georgian history—Levan returned with the Ottoman troops from Erzurum and Trebizond, forced Gurieli to buy peace for 10,000 dirhams, and resumed his reign. The two princes-regnant then collaborated in dividing the estates of the Imeretian princes Chiladze, who had been dispossessed by the king for their support of Khosro's revolt.

== Other sources on Dadiani's visit to Constantinople ==
Dadiani's Constantinopolitan journey is also known from more contemporaneous sources—European diplomatic documents and a charter issued by Levan I's grandson, Levan II Dadiani. These sources disagree with the Georgian chronicles regarding the nature of help provided by the sultan, as well as the date of Dadiani's mission.

In 1560, the Venetian diplomat Marino Cavalli reported that, four or five years ago, Dadian, prince or king of the Mingrelians, had visited the sultan in person to secure his support against his blood-enemies, the Circassians, and had been given six galleys. He then chose to make peace with the Circassians rather to make himself too much dependent on the Ottomans. Around the same time, the Habsburg ambassador to Constantinople, Ogier Ghiselin de Busbecq, communicated to his superiors an information about Dadian, king of the Mingrelians, who came to the Ottoman capital to ask for some war vessels against his neighbors, "the Iberians" (that is, Imeretians), and was willing to pay tribute to the sultan in exchange of this assistance. Busbecq was also aware of Dadian's past captivity at the hands of "the Iberians", who had captured him during a drinking party after a peace conference. The Croato-Hungarian diplomat Antun Vrančić reported that the prince, referring to himself as King of All Mingrelia, visited Constantinople, in February 1557, to obtain the Ottoman naval assistance against the Circassians, who had killed his father. Vrančić wrote that the Mingrelian ruler brought a precious bowl as present and was ready to pay taxes to the sultan of which he had previously been exempted.

Levan's journey to Constantinople is also referenced in his namesake grandson's charter. The document, issued sometime between 1639 and 1657, does not specify the date and purpose of this visit, but states that the sultan granted to Levan nine vessels which were placed by Dadiani under the command of a certain Kristekochi Ratia.

== Death and family ==
According to Beri Egnatashvili's compendium, Levan died in 1572, when he broke his neck in a hunting accident masterminded by the Mingrelian nobleman Jaiani. His successor was his oldest son, George III Dadiani.

Levan seems to have been married twice. A woman named Elene and identified as the wife of Levan Dadiani is known from a margin note in the Tsalenjikha Gospel. The other, called Marekhi, is depicted, alongside Levan and their daughter, in a fresco in the chapel of the Tsalenjikha Cathedral. Levan had four sons and three daughters:

- George III Dadiani (died 1582), Prince of Mingrelia from 1572 to 1573 and again from 1578 to1582;
- Mamia IV Dadiani (died 1590), Prince of Mingrelia from 1573 to 1578 and again from 1582 to 1590;
- Manuchar I Dadiani (died 1611), Prince of Mingrelia from 1590 to 1611;
- Anonymous daughter, briefly married, c. 1566, to George III Gurieli;
- Anonymous daughter, who married, in 1573, Prince Bagrat, son of King George II of Imereti;
- Marekhi, who married twice; first, on 6 June 1564, Qvarqvare IV Jaqeli, Prince of Samtskhe, whom she divorced in March 1580, and married her second husband, King Levan of Imereti in 1586;
- George (died c. 1619), Lord of Salipartiano and the first to bear the title of Lipartiani. He was the father of Vameq III Dadiani, Prince-Regnant of Mingrelia.

Levan I Dadiani House of Dadiani Born: ? Died: 1572
Regnal titles
Preceded by Mamia III Dadiani	Prince of Mingrelia; 1533–1572	Succeeded by George III Dadiani
