= George X =

King of Kartli from 1600 to 1606

King of Kartli
- Reign: 1600–1606
- Predecessor: Simon I
- Successor: Luarsab II
- Born: 1560
- Died: 7 September 1606 (aged 45–46)
- Burial: Svetitskhoveli Cathedral
- Spouse: Tamar Lipartiani
- Issue: Luarsab II; David; Khoreshan; Tinatin; Helen
- Dynasty: Bagrationi
- Father: Simon I of Kartli
- Mother: Nestan-Darejan of Kakheti
- Religion: Georgian Orthodox Church
- Khelrtva

George X (Georgian: გიორგი X, romanized: giorgi X; 1560 – 7 September 1606), of the Bagrationi dynasty, was a king (mepe) of the Georgian Kingdom of Kartli from 1600 until his death in 1606.

== Biography ==
George was the eldest son of Simon I of Kartli and his wife, Nestan-Darejan, daughter of Levan of Kakheti. George fought alongside his father against the Ottoman occupation forces since 1598. He held power after Simon was taken captive by the Turks at the Battle of Nakhiduri in 1599. George attempted several times, though vainly, to ransom his father (who would die as a prisoner in 1612) from captivity and even offered to the Sublime Porte his son as hostage. He soon returned to his struggle against the Ottomans and recovered Lori in 1601. In 1602, when the Safavid shah of Persia Abbas I resumed a war against the Ottomans, George sided with the Persians and led the Georgian auxiliary troops which took part in the conquest of Erivan in 1603/1604. As a reward, Abbas I granted George X a minor possession in Iran. In exchange, the shah asked for an area in the Debed River valley in the strategic Lorri district. Abbas I populated this territory with members of the Turkmen tribe Borchali. Finally, the Shah permitted George X to return to Kartli.

He was the first king of Kartli who attempted to establish diplomatic ties with the northern co-religionist power of Muscovy. George decided even to give his daughter Helen to the Feodor II of Russia in marriage. However, unstable political situation in both countries terminated these contacts.

According to Georgian chronicles, George X died suddenly, from a sting on his tongue, after biting into a cake with a bee in it, at Mejvriskhevi, 1606. There have also been some speculations that the king was poisoned on the orders of the Persian Shah Abbas I. He was buried at Mtskheta.

== Family ==
George married on 15 September 1578 to Tamar Lipartiani, daughter of George Lipartiani. Their children were:

- Luarsab II (1592–1622), King of Kartli (r. 1606–1615), martyr and saint of the Georgian Orthodox Church;
- Prince David, who was sent by his father as a hostage to Istanbul in order to rescue Simon I from Ottoman captivity;
- Princess Khoreshan (died 1659), who was promised to Baadur I, Duke of Aragvi, but instead married Teimuraz I of Kakheti in 1612, during the reign of her brother Luarsab II;
- Princess Tinatin (Lela; known as Fatma Sultan Begum and possibly as Gulchara in Iran), who was given in marriage in 1604 to Shah Abbas I. After the execution of her brother Luarsab II, the Shah divorced her and subsequently married her to Paykar Khan Igirmi Durt, Khan of Barda and governor of Kakheti (1620–1625);
- Princess Helen, who was affianced to Feodor II of Russia.

== Sources ==
- Floor, Willem; Herzig, Edmund, eds. (2012). Iran and the World in the Safavid Age. I.B.Tauris. ISBN 978-1850439301.
- Mikaberidze, Alexander (2015). Historical Dictionary of Georgia (2 ed.). Rowman & Littlefield. p. 335. ISBN 978-1442241466.
- Allen, W. E. D. (1970). Russian Embassies to the Georgian Kings, 1589–1605: Volumes I and II. Taylor & Francis. ISBN 978-1-317-06040-6.
- Toumanoff, Cyril (1976). Manuel de Généalogie et de Chronologie pour l'histoire de la Caucasie chrétienne (Arménie, Géorgie, Albanie) [Manual of Genealogy and Chronology of Christian Caucasian History (Armenia, Georgia, Albania)] (in French). Rome: Edizioni Aquila.

Preceded by Simon I	King of Kartli; 1600–1606	Succeeded by Luarsab II
