= Kaikhosro I Jaqeli =

Atabeg of Samtskhe
- Reign: 1498–1500
- Predecessor: Qvarqvare II
- Successor: Mzetchabuki
- Born: 1443
- Died: 1500 (aged 56–57)
- Issue: Qvarqvare III Jaqeli
- Dynasty: Jaqeli
- Father: Qvarqvare II Jaqeli
- Religion: Orthodox Christianity

Kaikhosro I Jaqeli (Georgian: ქაიხოსრო I ჯაყელი; 1443–1500) was a Prince and Atabeg of Samtskhe-Saatabago, member of the Jaqeli family and son of Qvarqvare II. His reign lasted from 1498 to 1500. According to Kaikhosro's contemporaries, he was a wise and educated ruler. He held peace with the other Georgian kingdoms:Kartli, Kakheti and Imereti. Kaikhosro with king Alexander I of Kakheti and Constantine of Kartli agreed to assist first Safavid shah Ismail in destroying Aq Koyunlu rule in Persia. Atabeg Kaikhosro died in 1500 and was succeeded by his younger brother Mzetchabuk Jaqeli.

Kaikhosro I Jaqeli Jaqeli
Preceded by Qvarqvare II	Prince of Meskheti; 1498-1500	Succeeded by Mzetchabuki
