= Mzetchabuk Jaqeli =

Member of Georgian nobility and Atabeg of Samtskhe-Saatabago

Atabeg of Samtskhe
- Reign: 1500–1515
- Predecessor: Kaikhosro I
- Successor: Manuchar I
- Born: 1445
- Died: 1516
- Dynasty: Jaqeli
- Father: Qvarqvare II Jaqeli
- Religion: Orthodox Christianity

Mzetchabuk Jaqeli (Georgian: მზეჭაბუკ ჯაყელი) (1445 – 1516) was a Prince and Atabeg of Samtskhe-Saatabago during 1500–1515, member of the Jaqeli family and son of Qvarqvare II Jaqeli. After his older brother's death Mzetchabuk had seized the Atabeg's throne from his nephew, Qvarqvare. He was an ambitious and arrogant ruler. Like his father and grandfather, Mzetchabuk demanded the separation of the Meskhetian church from the Georgian Orthodox church. Atabeg Mzetchabuk Strived to strengthen Samtskhe. He nominally obeyed Ottoman sultan Selim I and with his help Adjara came fully under Meskhetian rule. In 1515 old Mzetchabuk abdicated and became a monk, received a monastic name Jacob. After Mzetchabuk Atabeg's title would be given to his nephew Qvarqvare, but Mzetchabuk's younger brother Manuchar rebelled against him. The war for succession was won by Manuchar and he became the next Atabeg. Mzetchabuk Jaqeli died in 1516, at the age of 70–71.

Mzetchabuk Jaqeli Jaqeli
| Preceded by Kaikhosro I | Prince of Meskheti; 1500-1515 | Succeeded by Manuchar I |
