= Simon I of Kartli =

King of Kartli (r. 1556–1569, 1578–1600)

Simon I
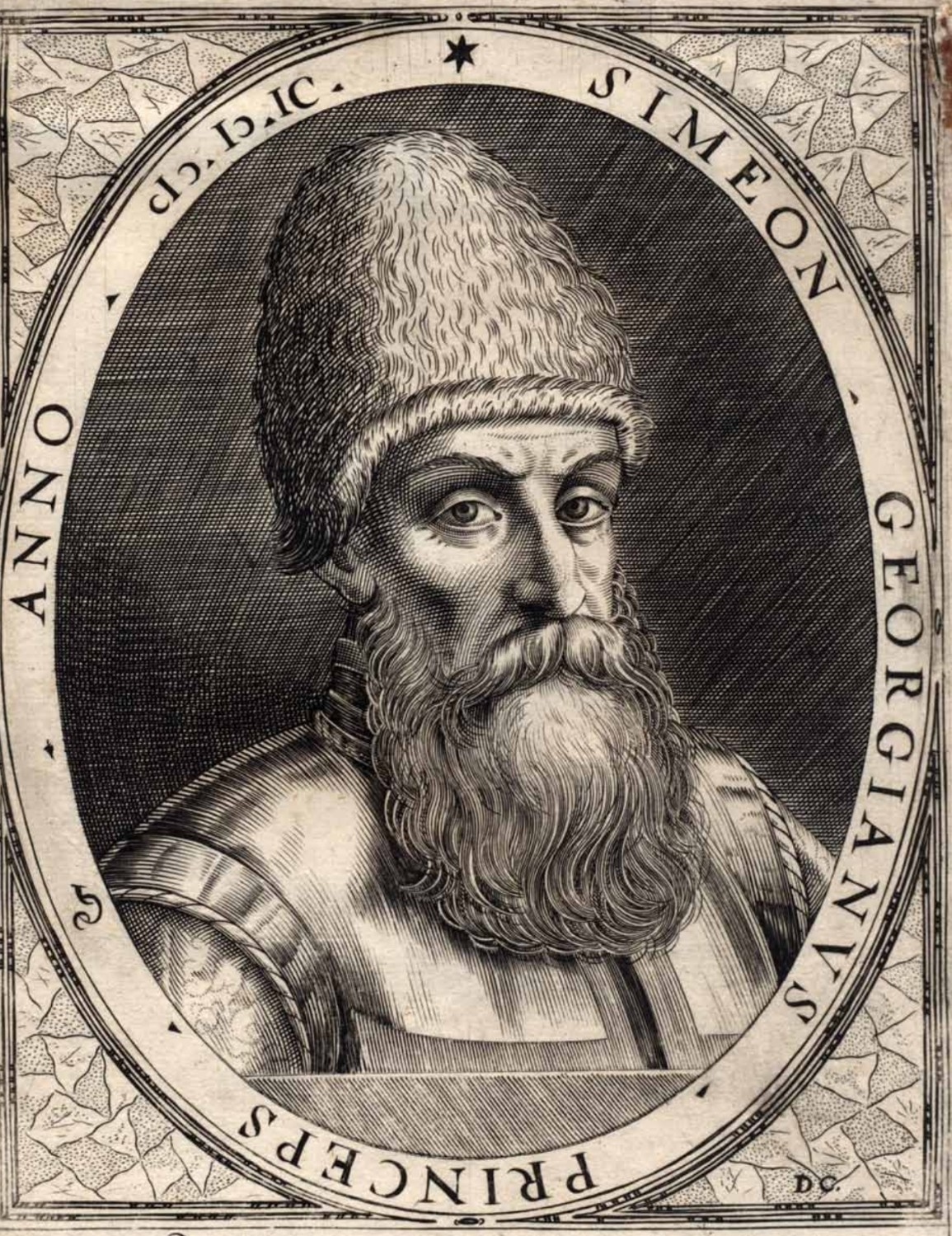
- Engraving of King Simon I by Dominicus Custos, published in Augsburg in 1600.

King of Kartli
- 1st reign: 1556–1569
- Predecessor: Luarsab I
- Successor: David XI
- 2nd reign: 1578–1600
- Predecessor: David XI
- Successor: George X
- Born: 1537
- Died: 1611 (aged 73–74); Constantinople, Yedikule Fortress
- Burial: Svetitskhoveli Cathedral
- Spouse: Nestan-Darejan of Kakheti (m. 1559)
- Issue Among others: George X
- Dynasty: Bagrationi
- Father: Luarsab I
- Mother: Tamar of Imereti
- Religion: Georgian Orthodox Church
- Khelrtva
- Military career
- Conflicts: Tree list: Battle of Garisi; Battle of Tsikhedidi; Battle of Digomi; Battle of Mukhrani; Battle of Gopanto; Siege of Gori; Battle of Nakhiduri

Simon I the Great (Georgian: სიმონ I დიდი, romanized: simon I didi), also known as Svimon (Note: During 1557 to 1569 he was known as Mahmud Khan (Persian: محمود خان, romanized: Mahmūd Khān) and from 1578 to 1599 as Shahnavaz Khan (Persian: شاهنواز خان, romanized: Shāhnavāz Khān). He was also referred to as Simon the Mad (Turkish: Deli Simon) by the Ottomans.) (Georgian: სვიმონი, romanized: svimoni; 1537–1611), of the Bagrationi dynasty, was a king (mepe) of the Georgian Kingdom of Kartli from 1556 to 1569 and again from 1578 to 1600. His first tenure was marked by war against the Persian domination of Georgia. In 1569 he was captured by the Persians, and spent nine years in captivity. In 1578 he was released and reinstalled in Kartli. During this period (i.e. his second tenure), he fought as a Persian subject against the Ottoman domination of Georgia. In 1599 Simon I was captured by the Ottomans and died in captivity.

== First reign and struggle against Persia ==
The eldest son of the heroic king Luarsab I and his wife, Tamar, daughter of Bagrat III of Imereti. Simon commanded his father's army at the Battle of Garisi against the Persian invaders, 1556. He was proclaimed by his father co-ruler and heir apparent just prior to the action. Though Luarsab was mortally wounded, the battle was won by Simon, who soon ascended the throne on the death of his father. As the Kartlian capital Tbilisi remained in the Persian hands, Simon had a residence in Gori, whence he ruled over the territories recaptured from the occupiers. In 1559, he allied himself with another Georgian sovereign, Levan of Kakheti, and married his daughter Nestan-Darejan. Beginning in 1560, Simon launched a series of battles to recover Tbilisi, but in April 1561 suffered a defeat at the Battle of Tsikhedidi, which cost life to his brother-in-law and ally, Prince George of Kakheti. His brother, David, recently submitted to the Safavid Shah Tahmasp I, converted to Islam, and returned with a Persian army to claim the crown. Simon blockaded Tbilisi and won the battles at Dighomi (1567) and Samadlo (1569), but he was finally defeated and taken prisoner at Partskhisi, 1569. David, now known as Daud Khan, was made by Persians a tributary king of Kartli. Simon was sent to Persia where he refused to convert to Islam and was imprisoned at the fortress of Alamut for nine years.

== Second reign and struggle against the Ottomans ==
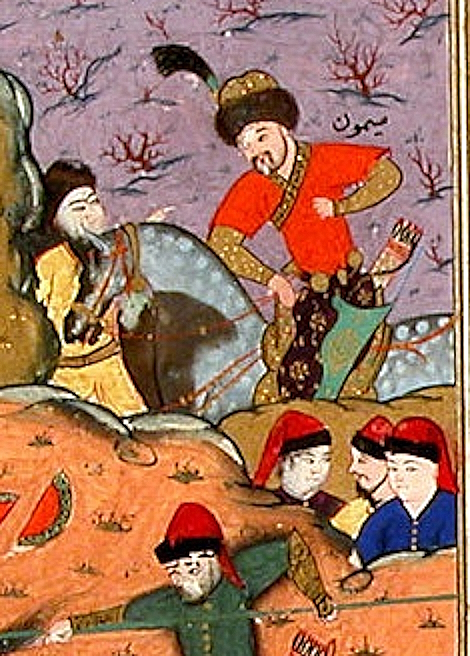
Simon with his troops in a battle with the Ottoman Erzurum army circa 1579-80. Secaatname (1586)

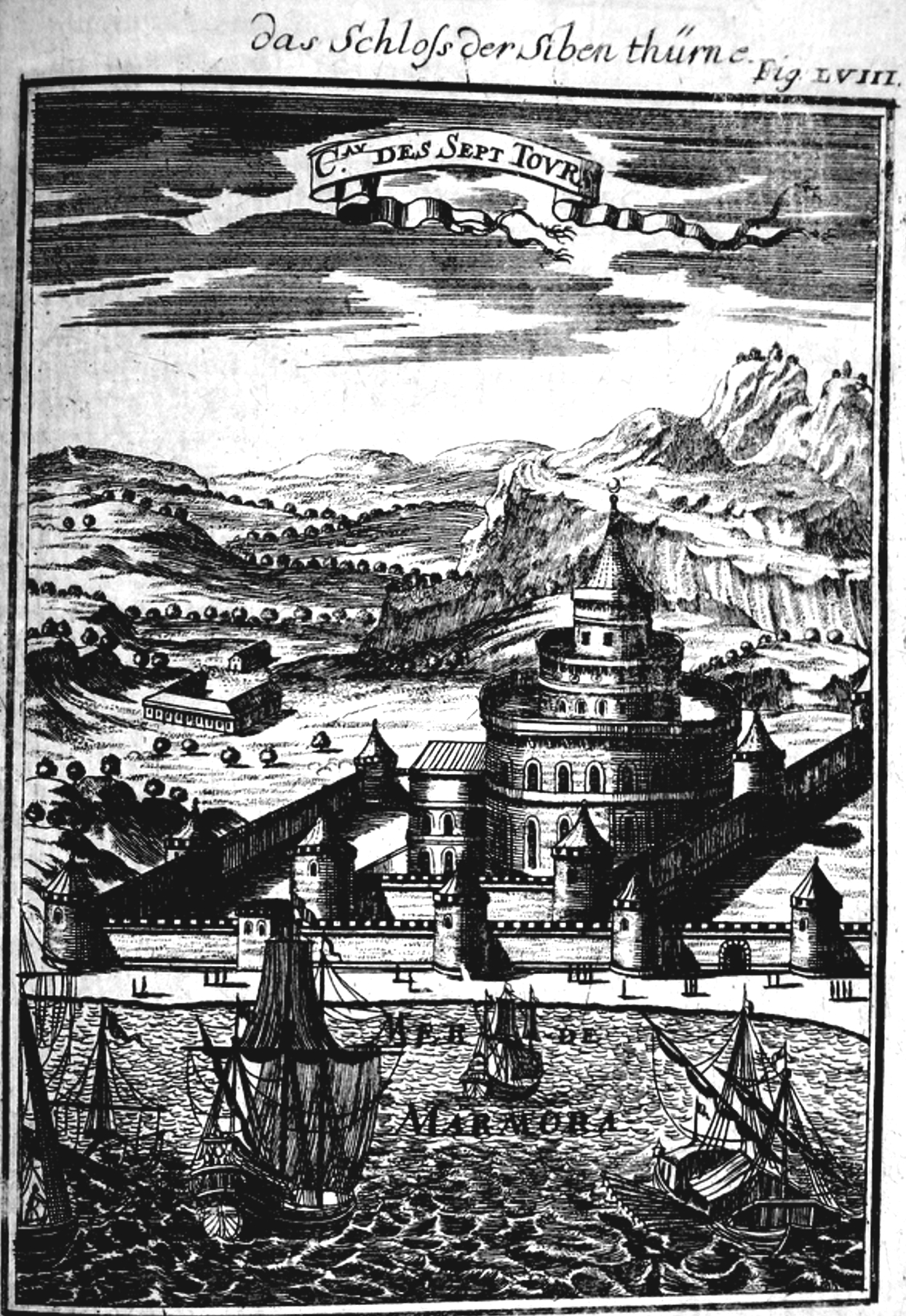
The Fortress of the Seven Towers, where Simon died around 1611.

When the peace between the Safavids and the Ottomans collapsed and the Turkish general Lala Mustafa Pasha drove the Persians out of Georgia in 1578, it roused the Safavids to take further action. At the start of the Ottoman–Safavid War (1578–1590), the incumbent Safavid Shah Mohammad Khodabanda sought a popular puppet ruler in Kartli and therefore ordered Simon I to be released from prison, where he had been held for nine years. Simon was offered the crown of Kartli on the condition that he convert to Islam, a demand he accepted after years of captivity. The Safavids then supplied him with cannon and 5,000 Qizilbash soldiers under the command of Ali-Qoli Khan Shamlu to invade Tbilisi. Upon his return to Georgia, however, Simon renounced Islam, reverted to Christianity, and assumed leadership of the Georgian resistance, this time directed against the Ottomans. He led a successful guerrilla campaign, recovered most of Kartli by 1579, and laid siege to Tbilisi. At the same time, he induced Prince Manuchar II Jaqeli to revolt against Ottoman rule in Akhaltsikhe and sought support from Pope Clement VIII, Emperor Rudolph II, and Philip II of Spain. These diplomatic efforts, however, failed to produce any significant results.

In 1580 Simon I repulsed Ottoman invasion of Kartli, and in 1582 defeated main Ottoman army on the field of Mukhrani, which had a lasting impact as Ottomans were at the height of their power and such a defeat shuttered the myth of their invincibility. Simon I's Persian monolingual seal of the same period reads: "Allah, who has no equal, knows that Semiyun (Simon) is a slave of the Shah from the bottom of his heart, 933 (1585)".

From 1588 to 1590, Simon interfered on three occasions into a power struggle in the western Georgian kingdom of Imereti, and though victorious over Levan of Imereti at the Battle of Gopanto (1588), he was finally defeated at Opshkviti and driven out with the help of the Turks. Finally, the Ottomans prevailed and their recently appointed commander, Ferhad Pasha, was able to conquer Kartli by 1588. Simon had to make peace with the Sublime Porte and agreed to pay an annual tribute. By a peace treaty signed in Constantinople on March 21, 1590, the Safavids also recognised all of Georgia as an Ottoman possession. Simon, however, resumed his struggle against the occupants in 1595, and retook Gori after a long-lasting siege in 1599. In response, Sultan Mehmed III sent a large punitive force led by Jafar Pasha, the beylerbey of Tabriz, in 1599. Simon met them at Nakhiduri, but he was severely defeated in the battle and taken captive while attempting to escape.

Upon the Simon's arrest the Sultan Mehmed III made the following order:

From Morocco to the Caspian Sea, from the Caucasus to the Persian Gulf, I order to exhibit the carpets in all of my realm and to celebrate for 3 days the arrest of King Simon.

Simon was sent to Constantinople where the Georgian noblewoman Gulchara was brought to care for the aged king. He died in 1611 as a prisoner at the Fortress of the Seven Towers (Yedikule) without converting to Sunni Islam, shortly before the cessation of the Ottoman–Safavid hostilities. His body was then redeemed by the Georgians and buried at the Svetitskhoveli Cathedral at Mtskheta next to his father.

== Family ==
In 1559, Simon married Nestan-Darejan (fl. 1556–1612), daughter of Levan of Kakheti. They had six children, four sons and two daughters:

- George X (1560–1606), King of Kartli (r. 1599–1606);
- Prince Luarsab (fl. 1561–1589), who was taken as a hostage to Iran in 1582;
- Princess Helen (fl. 1583–1609), who married Manuchar II Jaqeli, Atabag of Samtskhe;
- Prince Alexander (fl. 1561–1589);
- Prince Vakhtang (fl. 1600). Prince Vakhushti of Kartli erroneously identified him as the father of Prince Luarsab of Kartli (died 1652), a genealogy later accepted by Cyril Toumanoff;
- Princess Fahrijan-Begum (fl. 1582), who married Hamza Mirza, son of Mohammad Khodabanda.

== Sources ==
- Beradze, Grigol (2012). "On the History of the Political Relations of Safavid Iran and Georgia: King Luarsab II and His Captivity in Iran". In Floor, Willem; Herzig, Edmund (eds.). Iran and the World in the Safavid Age. I.B. Tauris. ISBN 978-1780769905.
- Mikaberidze, Alexander (2015). Historical Dictionary of Georgia (2nd ed.). Rowman & Littlefield.
- Rayfield, Donald (2012). Edge of Empires: A History of Georgia. Reaktion Books. ISBN 978-1780230702.
- Rota, Giorgio (2017). "Conversion to Islam (and sometimes a return to Christianity) in Safavid Persia in the sixteenth and seventeenth centuries". In Norton, Claire (ed.). Conversion and Islam in the Early Modern Mediterranean: The Lure of the Other. Routledge. ISBN 978-1317159797.
- Svimon I (In Georgian)
- (in English) History of Iranian-Georgian relations by Keith Hitchins at Iranica.com
- Toumanoff, Cyril (1976). Manuel de Généalogie et de Chronologie pour l'histoire de la Caucasie chrétienne (Arménie, Géorgie, Albanie) [Manual of Genealogy and Chronology of Christian Caucasian History (Armenia, Georgia, Albania)] (in French). Rome: Edizioni Aquila.
- Lordkipanidze, Mariam; Metreveli, Roin (2000). Sakʻartʻvelos mepʻeebi (in Georgian). Tbilisi: Nekeri. ISBN 9992858362.

Preceded by Luarsab I	King of Kartli; 1556–1569	Succeeded by David XI
Preceded by David XI	King of Kartli; 1578–1600	Succeeded by George X
