= George IX of Kartli =

16th-century King of Kartli

George IX

King of Kartli
- Reign: 1525–1527
- Predecessor: David X
- Successor: Luarsab I
- Died: 1539/40
- Spouse: Gulshar
- Dynasty: Bagrationi
- Father: Constantine II of Georgia
- Religion: Georgian Orthodox Church
- Khelrtva

George IX (Georgian: გიორგი IX, romanized: giorgi IX; died 1539/40) was a king (mepe) of the Georgian kingdom of Kartli from 1525 to 1527 (or 1534).

== Biography ==
The second son of the Georgian king Constantine II and his wife, Queen Tamar, he succeeded on the abdication of his elder brother, David X, in 1525. The relations of the king with other members of the royal family were strained. That may have forced George to withdraw to a monastery under the name of Gerasime, leaving the throne to his energetic nephew, Luarsab I. The sources are confused about when exactly George IX abdicated, some claiming it occurred in 1527 (more accepted date) while others placing the event around 1534.

Preceded by David X	King of Kartli; 1525–1527	Succeeded by Luarsab I
