= David X =

King of Kartli from 1505 to 1525

King of Kartli
- Reign: 1505–1525
- Predecessor: Constantine II
- Successor: George IX
- Died: 1526
- Spouse: Nestan-Darejan or Miraingul Baratashvili; Tamar Jaqeli
- Issue Among others: Luarsab I; Prince Ramaz
- Dynasty: Bagrationi
- Father: Constantine II of Georgia
- Mother: Tamar
- Religion: Georgian Orthodox Church
- Khelrtva

David X (Georgian: დავით X, romanized: davit X; died 1526), of the Bagrationi dynasty, was the second king (mepe) of the Kingdom of Kartli from 1505 to 1525.

== Biography ==
David was the eldest son of Constantine II, whom he succeeded as king of Kartli in 1505. Although Constantine had recognised the independence of the breakaway Georgian kingdoms of Imereti and Kakheti, the rivalry among these polities continued under David. He had to defend his kingdom against the attacks by Alexander II of Imereti in the west, and George II of Kakheti in the east. In August 1509, Alexander took fort-city Gori and the northwestern corner of Kartli, but had to abandon the occupied lands to David due to the Ottoman raid on Imereti in 1510. A year later, George of Kakheti surged into Kartli, but failed to capture the king in a besieged castle of Ateni.

In 1513, George invaded again, only to be defeated and taken prisoner by David’s younger brother Bagrat, Prince of Mukhrani. He died in captivity and his kingdom was annexed to Kartli. In 1518, the Persian shah Ismail I of the newly established Safavid Empire, sent in an army under Div Sultan Rumlu, who was joined by the Georgian prince Qvarqvare III Jaqeli, atabeg of Samtskhe. The invaders occupied Surami and Gori, and David had to make peace with the Persians and to promise to pay tribute. Meanwhile, the Kakhetian nobles used the opportunity to install Levan, son of the late king George II, as their king. David besieged the Maghrani Castle where Levan had taken positions, but soon had to abandon the siege as the Qizilbash appeared again in the Georgian lands. David recognised Lavan as the king of Kakheti in order to win his support against the invaders.

In 1522, he refused to convert to Islam as Shah Ismail had demanded. A new Persian invasion ensued, led this time personally by the Shah. David and his son, Luarsab, offered him a fierce resistance at the Battle of Teleti, but were finally outnumbered and defeated. The Kartlian capital Tbilisi was taken by treachery and garrisoned by a large Persian force, making east Georgia nominally fall for the first time under Safavid rule. On the death of Ismail in 1524, David liberated Tbilisi and expelled the Persians from the country. The Safavid Persians would later try to retake Tbilisi.

In 1525, he reconquered Aghjakala, Lower Kartli, and massacred all the Turkoman Qizilbash who had settled there. The same year, he abdicated the throne in favor of his younger brother George IX, and retired to a monastery under the name of Damiane. David X died in 1526 and was buried at the Svetitskhoveli Cathedral at Mtskheta.

== Family ==
David, as crown prince, first married Nestan-Darejan or Miraingul Baratashvili, daughter of Prince David Baratashvili (fl. 1488–1512), but the union was denounced by David's father, Constantine II.

David married secondly to Princess Tamar Jaqeli (died in 1554), daughter of Qvarqvare II Jaqeli, Atabeg of Samtskhe. She might have been the mother of all of David's children, including his eldest son and successor Luarsab I. Prince Vakhushti reports that the mother of Luarsab was captured by Shah Tahmasp I at Ateni and carried off to Iran, where she committed suicide by poisoning in 1556. According to Cyril Toumanoff, Nestan-Darejan/Miraingul was the mother of David's three sons, Luarsab, Adarnase, and Ramaz, and it was she who committed suicide in 1556. He considers Tamar to have been the third name of this queen, such polyonymy not being infrequent in Georgia at that time.

David had eight children:

- Luarsab I (died 1556), King of Kartli (r. 1527–1556);
- Prince Demetrius (fl. 1516–1540);
- Prince Bezhan, died of leprosy;
- Prince Adarnase (fl. 1512–1558);
- Prince Ramaz (fl. 1512–1580), who married a certain Khvaramze and had two sons;
- An unnamed daughter;
- An unnamed daughter, who married Baadur, Duke of Aragvi;
- An unnamed daughter, who married Javakh Chiladze.

== Notes ==
| Preceded by Constantine II | King of Kartli; 1505–1525 | Succeeded by George IX |
