= Battle of Sokhoista =

1545 battle in Turkey

Date	1545
Location	Sokhoista field (now Pasinler District, Turkey)
Result	Ottoman victory

Belligerents
Ottoman Empire	Kingdom of Imereti; Kingdom of Kartli; Principality of Guria

Commanders and leaders
Rustem Pasha	Bagrat III; Luarsab I

The Battle of Sokhoista (Georgian: სოხოისტის ბრძოლა, Turkish: Sohoista Savaşı) was fought between the Ottoman and Georgian armies at the Sokhoista field in what is now northeastern Turkey in 1545. It was the last attempt of the separate Georgian dynasts to fight as one unit against the Ottoman expansion, but ended in their decisive defeat. This might be the same battle as mentioned by Rüstem Pasha to have been fought at nearby Zivin.

== Background ==
The battle was preceded by an unsuccessful siege of the Georgian-garrisoned fortress of Oltisi (now Oltu, Turkey) by the Ottoman beylerbey of Erzurum Musa Paşa also known as Kizil-Ahmedlu, and his subsequent defeat at Karagak in 1543. Musa Paşa was himself killed in fighting. The Ottomans returned in force two years later, and moved into the principality of Samtskhe, then under the control of Bagrat III, king of Imereti in western Georgia. Bagrat called upon the neighboring Georgian potentates to come to aid. Only the king of Kartli Luarsab I and the prince of Guria Rostom Gurieli responded, while the prince of Mingrelia, Levan I Dadiani, refused to participate in the alliance.

== Battle ==
The two opposing armies met at the locale called Sokhoista which lay on the border of the district of Basean (now Pasinler District, Turkey). The Georgian chronicle of Prince Vakhushti provides with some details of the battle. According to this source, the nobles of Samtskhe resented the refusal of the Georgian kings to allow them to fight in the vanguard as it long had been established by a medieval custom, and refused to take part in the battle at all. The hard-contested action lasted from the dawn to the evening, and ended in a decisive Ottoman victory.

The victory at Sokhoista gave to the Ottomans the upper hand in southwestern Caucasus and allowed them to overrun Samtskhe, where they installed their protégé, atabek Kaikhosro III. Tortum, İspir, and Pasin were detached from Samtskhe and annexed to the Ottoman Empire. The battle also created a favorable precondition prior to the Ottoman-Saffavid peace deal at Amasya in 1555.
