= Luarsab I =

16th-century King of Kartli

King of Kartli
- Reign: 1527–1556
- Predecessor: George IX
- Successor: Simon I
- Died: 1556
- Burial: Svetitskhoveli Cathedral
- Spouse: Tamar of Imereti (m. 1526)
- Issue Among others: Simon I of Kartli; David XI; Prince Vakhtang
- Dynasty: Bagrationi
- Father: David X
- Mother: Tamar Jaqeli
- Religion: Georgian Orthodox Church
- Khelrtva

Luarsab I (Georgian: ლუარსაბ I; died 1556), of the Bagrationi dynasty, was a king (mepe) of the Georgian Kingdom of Kartli from 1527 to 1556.

== Biography ==
The eldest son of David X by his second wife, Princess Tamar Jaqeli, he succeeded on the abdication of his uncle, George IX, in 1527 (more accepted date) or 1534.

When young, he distinguished himself as a commander in his father’s army, particularly at the Battle of Teleti (1522), won by a Persian invasion army in spite of heavy losses. He established close contacts with Bagrat III of Imereti, king of Imereti (western Georgia) and married in 1526 his daughter. A year later, he was crowned king of Kartli and launched a series of measures to strengthen the kingdom’s defence capacity amid the ongoing war between the Safavid Empire and Ottoman Empire (1514–1555). In alliance with Bagrat of Imereti, Luarsab fought both empires trying to preserve his independence and reestablish close cooperation between various Georgian polities. In 1535, Bagrat conquered a pro-Ottoman southern Georgian principality of Samtskhe, granting its province Javakheti to Kartli. The Kartlian-Imeretian alliance was soon joined by another Georgian monarch, Levan I of Kakheti. However, the 1541 invasion by the Persian shah Tahmasp I forced Levan out of a Georgian coalition, it left most of Kartli in ruins, and the capital Tbilisi garrisoned by a Persian force. The year 1545 brought another misfortune: a combined army of the Imeretian and Kartlian kings were crushed by the Ottomans at the Battle of Sokhoista and expelled from Samtskhe. From 1547 to 1554, Kartli suffered three more invasions by Tahmasp of Persia, who overran the country, but failed to force the king into submission. The Treaty of Amasya, 1555, between the Safavids and Ottomans left Georgia divided between these empires, with the east under Persian domination and the west under Turkish control. Luarsab, however, did not recognise the treaty, and continued desperate guerilla war against the Persian occupation forces virtually holding them under siege. In order to subdue the stubborn Georgian monarch, Shah Tahmasp sent Shahverdi Sultan, beglarbeg of Ganja and Karabakh, with a large army. Luarsab and his son, Simon, met the invaders at the Battle of Garisi. A heavy fight resulted in a Georgian victory, but Luarsab was mortally wounded.

Luarsab was buried at the Svetitskhoveli Cathedral at Mtskheta.

== Family ==
Luarsab I married Tamar, daughter of Bagrat III of Imereti, on 25 March 1526. They had eight children:

- An unnamed daughter, who married George, son of Levan of Kakheti;
- An unnamed son, who died in 1536 and was buried at Mtskheta;
- Simon I of Kartli (1537–1611), King of Kartli (r. 1556–1569, 1578–1599);
- David XI (Daud Khan) (1540–1582), King of Kartli (r. 1569–1578);
- Prince Vakhtang (fl. 1546–1605), sometime governor of Akhaldaba and Dirbi. He was married to a certain Tinatin and had a son, Teimuraz-Mirza, and a daughter, Tamar, who married Papuna Amilakhvari. Teimuraz-Mirza’s son, Luarsab (died 1652), was adopted by King Rostom of Kartli as his heir in 1639. Tamar married Prince Paremuz Amilakhvari;
- Prince Alexander (fl. 1546–1573);
- Prince Levan;
- An unnamed daughter, who married Kekaoz Chkheidze (fl. 1570–1590). Their son, Gorgasal Chkheidze of Racha (fl. 1590–1629), married a daughter of Giorgi Saakadze.

== Bibliography ==
- Lordkipanidze, Mariam; Metreveli, Roin (2000). Sakʻartʻvelos mepʻeebi (in Georgian). Tbilisi: Nekeri. ISBN 9992858362.

Preceded by George IX	King of Kartli; 1527–1556 (or 1534–1558)	Succeeded by Simon I
