= Jafar Pasha =

Ottoman governor

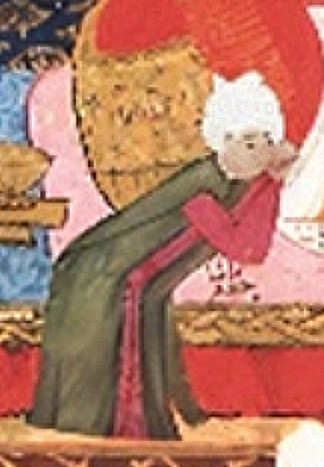
Jafar Pasha (جعفر پاشا) visiting Osman Pasha before his death in 1585. Secaatname, 1586

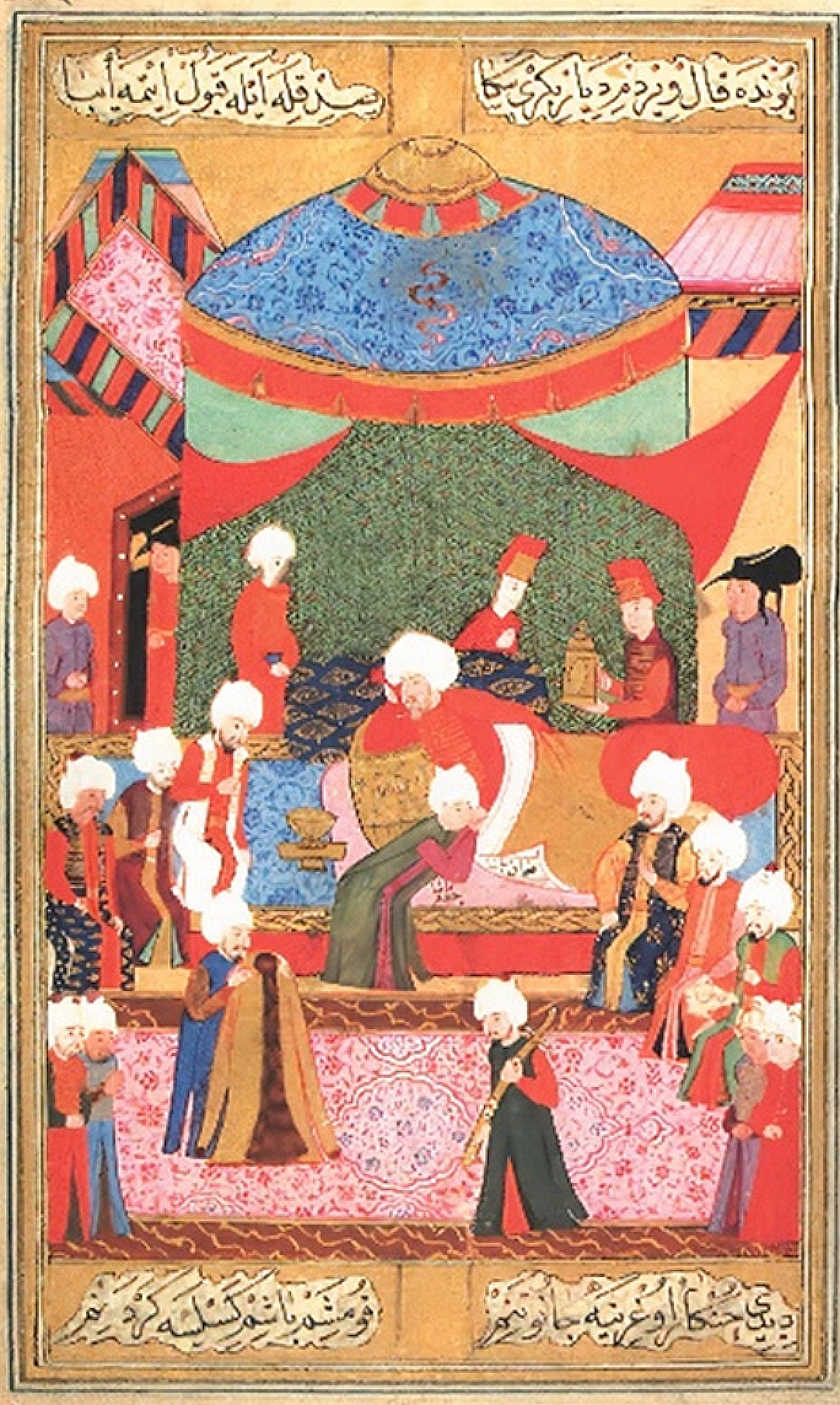
Jafar Pasha's visit to Osman Pasha before his death. Jafar Pasha is kissing Osman Pasha's hand to wear the royal robe of Tabriz. 1586 miniature, Secaatname

Jafar Pasha, also Jafar Pasha Frenk (جعفر پاشا, Jafar Pasha, "the European"), was the Ottoman Empire Governor of the city of Tabriz, following the capture of the city by the Ottomans in 1585. He was a "neo-Muslim" European in the service of the Ottoman Empire. The city would remain under Ottoman control for 18 years, until its recovery by the Safavid Empire ruler Shah Abbas in 1603.

== Biography ==
Jafar Pasha was originally an admiral, nicknamed Jafar Pasha Hādim (the Servant), Jafar Pasha Frenk (the European), and Jafar Pasha the Captain of the Seas. He variously held the positions of the Ottoman admiralty and governorship of Libyan Tripoli, Syrian Tripoli, and Cyprus. One source gives him as of Magyar descent, but other Ottoman sources affirmed he was Italian.

In 1585, Jafar Pasha was put in charge of the Ottoman conquest of Tabriz, under the command of Özdemirzade Osman Pasha. When the city was captured, he became the governor of Tabriz, from 1586 to 1591. Jafar Pasha famously destroyed the Hasht Behesht Palace in Tabriz, in order to build the Castle of Jafar Pasha in its place, a massive defensive structure. Nevertheless, the Hasht Behesht Palace was highly influential in the creation of other buildings in Iran, such as the Hasht Behesht in Isfahan, and contributed to the "Hasht Bihisht" model of architecture.

Jafar Pasha was also involved in the Ottoman policing of the region. By a peace treaty signed in Constantinople on March 21, 1590, the Safavids had recognized all of Georgia as an Ottoman possession. Simon I of Kartli, however, resumed his struggle against the Ottoman occupants in 1595, and retook Gori after a long-lasting siege in 1599. In response, sultan Mehmed III sent a large punitive force led by Jafar Pasha in 1599. Simon met it at Nakhiduri, but he was severely defeated and taken captive while retreating.

After Tabriz, Jafar Pasha was promoted to Ottoman admiral for the Mediterranean.

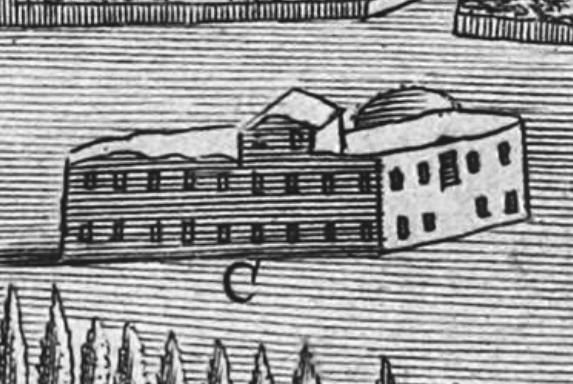
Castle of Jafar Pasha (detail), Tabriz (Jean Chardin, 1673)

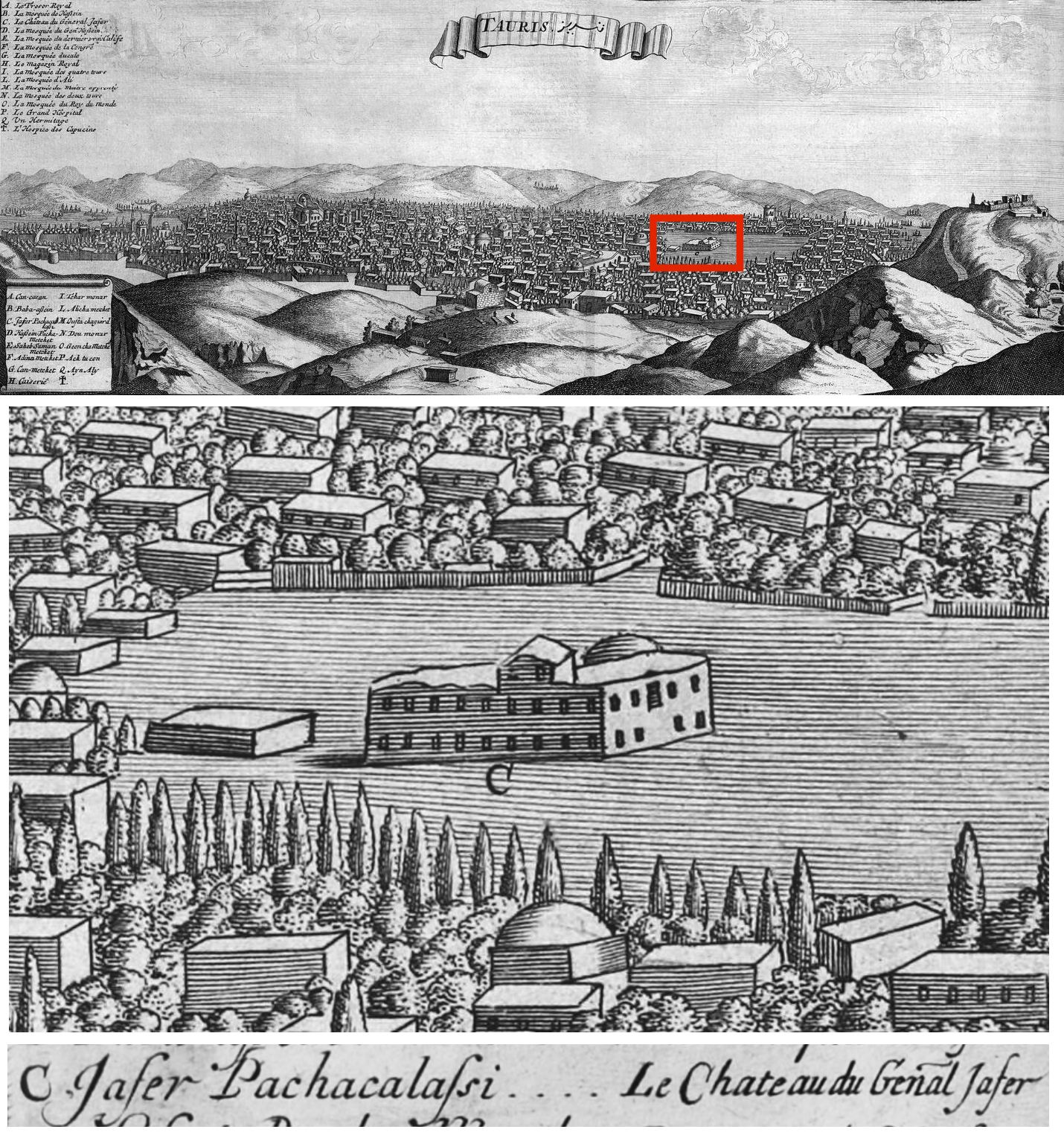
Location of the Castle of Jafar Pasha, Tabriz (Chardin, 1673)

== Sources ==
- Mikaberidze, Alexander (2015). Historical Dictionary of Georgia (2nd ed.). Rowman & Littlefield.
