= Hasht-behesht =

Hasht-behesht (Persian: هشت‌بهشت, hašt-behešt, literally "eight heavens") may refer to:

- Hasht Behesht, a pavilion in Isfahan, Iran
- Hasht-behesht (architecture), a type of floor plan
- Hasht-Bihisht (poem), a famous poem written by Amir Khusro
