= Chauburji (Agra) =

Historic site in Uttar Pradesh, India

Coordinates: 27°11′32″N 78°02′06″E

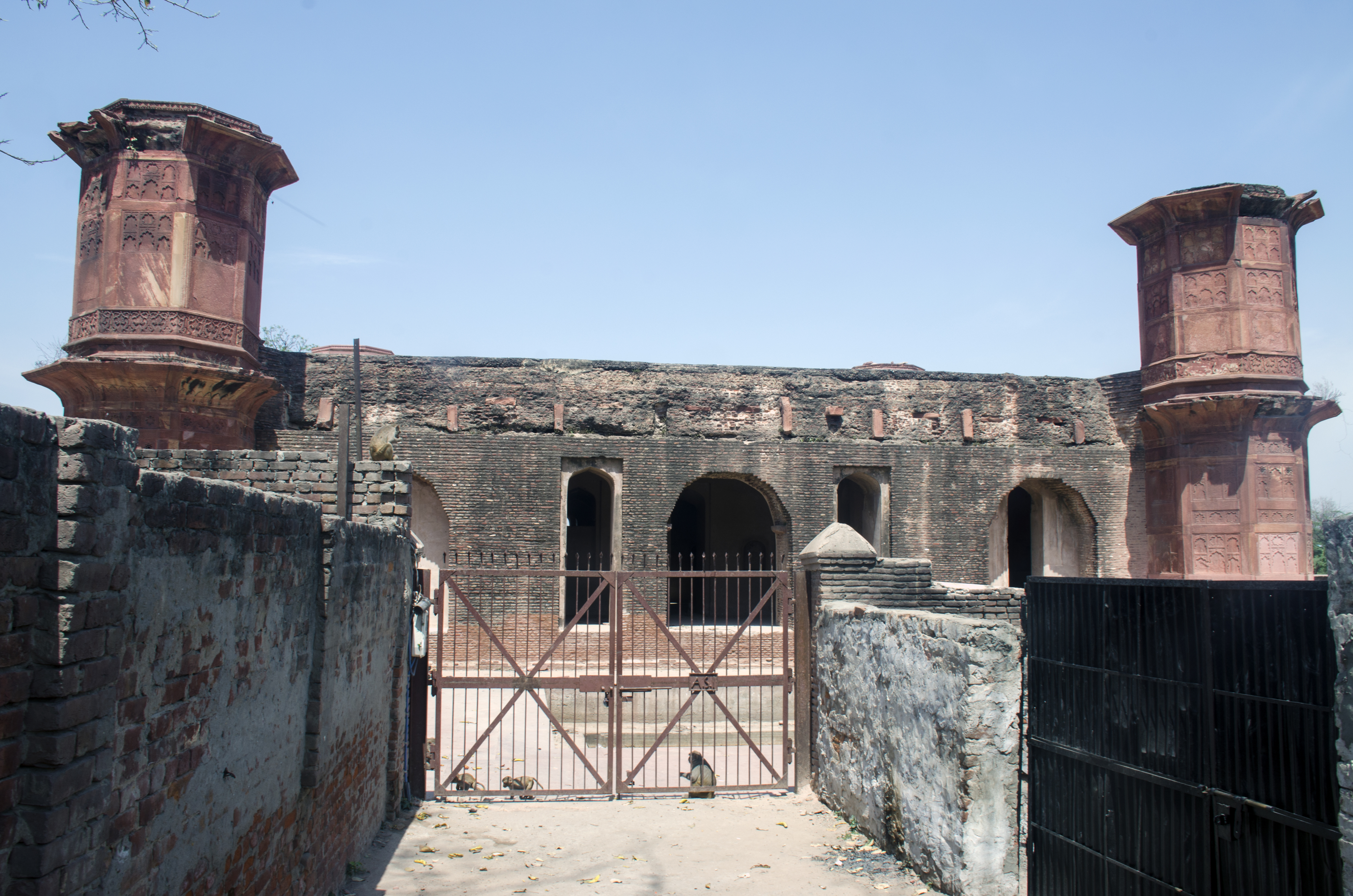
- Interactive map of Chauburji
- Location: Agra

Monument of National Importance
- Official name: Chauburji, of the temporary Burial place of Emperor Babur, together with the Chabutra on which it stands
- Reference no.: N-UP-A4

Chauburji (literally "Four Towers") is a building located in Agra, in the Indian state of Uttar Pradesh. Dating back to the Mughal period, the actual purpose of the building and its date of construction are debated by scholars.

It is set within a garden on the banks of the Yamuna river, and a small mosque is situated to its west. The building has a square plan, with towers on each of its four corners. Its interior is divided into nine interconnected chambers. It is listed as a monument of national importance.

== History ==
The purpose of the building, and the date of its construction is a matter of contention among historians. Ram Nath identifies it with the Chaukhandi within the gardens named Bagh-i Zar Afshan, which is considered to be the original burial place of the first Mughal emperor Babur. If this is the case, it would be among the first examples of Mughal architecture. It is not certain when the remains of Babur were shifted to the Gardens of Babur in Kabul, or whether they were shifted at all.

Other scholars ascribe it to the reign of the fourth Mughal emperor Jahangir, probably having been commissioned by his chief consort and empress Nur Jahan. The style of the exterior decorations of the mausoleum is consistent with the architectural style of this period. The architectural features of the mosque are typical of the reign of Jahangir's successor Shah Jahan, and this further lends support to the theory ascribing the complex to the reigns of Jahangir and Shah Jahan, that is, the early 17th century. In this case, the mausoleum and its garden may be identified with the Moti Bagh, mentioned in the 17th-century records of Francisco Pelsaert and Peter Mundy.

During the British colonial period, an English officer named Mr. Mackenzie utilized the mausoleum as his residence. He also destroyed the western wall of the nearby mosque, in order to convert it into a gateway. In 1936–37, it was declared a protected monument by the Archaeological Survey of India. As of 2021, it is surrounded by encroachments, and is not open to tourists.

== Description ==
The building is set within a garden, situated on the banks of the Yamuna river, near the Tomb of I'timād-ud-Daulah. The garden laid out in the charbagh style, and four rectangular tanks stand in front of each side of the mausoleum. There were originally four stone channels as well as pathways, which do not exist anymore.

The building is constructed out of stone, and has a square plan. Its architectural style resembles the Pathan Architecture of the Delhi Sultanate. Octagonal towers rise from all its four corners. The towers are two-storied, but they might originally have been three-storied, and crowned by an octagonal chhatri. The towers have spiral staircases within them, and barred windows are provided to let light into the towers. Three of these staircases can be accessed from the terrace of the building, while one can be accessed from the garden. The exterior of the towers is decorated with carved red sandstone.

Each facade has five arched entrances leading into the interior. The roof of the building has a raised pavilion, which might indicate that it might originally have been surmounted by a dome.

=== Interior ===
The interior follows the Hasht Bihisht layout, where a central hall is surrounded by eight rooms. Here, the central hall is square, measuring 7.4 × 7.4 metres. The surrounding rooms consist of four square chambers at the corners, and four rectangular rooms running along the sides of the building.

=== Mosque ===
To the west of the building is a mosque, called the Baburi Mosque. Very little of its original character survives, on account of several renovations. The mosque has three arched entrances on its eastern facade, opening into a courtyard. The central section of the facade, featuring the central archway, extends about 3 feet (0.91 m) forward from, and rises approximately 1.5 feet (0.46 m) higher than the rest of the mosque. A cornice runs along the top of the facade, with battlements in relief.

The prayer-hall measures 17.1 × 5.8 metres. It is crowned by three domes, the central dome being slightly larger than the others. This central dome is surrounded by four chhatri-styled pavilions, with square bases.

== Bibliography ==
- Raza, Mohammad Abdullah (2020). "Chauburji Monument at Agra: Its Plan and Inspirations". In Sinha, A. K.; Rizvi, S. N. R. (eds.). History: Past and Beyond. New Delhi: Anamika Publishers and Distributors.
- Nath, Ram. "Babur's Innovations". History Of Mughal Architecture. Vol. 1. pp. 109–119.
- Nath, Ram (1974). "Chauburj: The Tomb of Babur at Agra". Islamic Culture. Vol. 48, no. 3. Hyderabad.
