= Uzun Hasan Mosque =

Mosque in Tabriz, Iran

Coordinates: 38.08505°N 46.294094°E

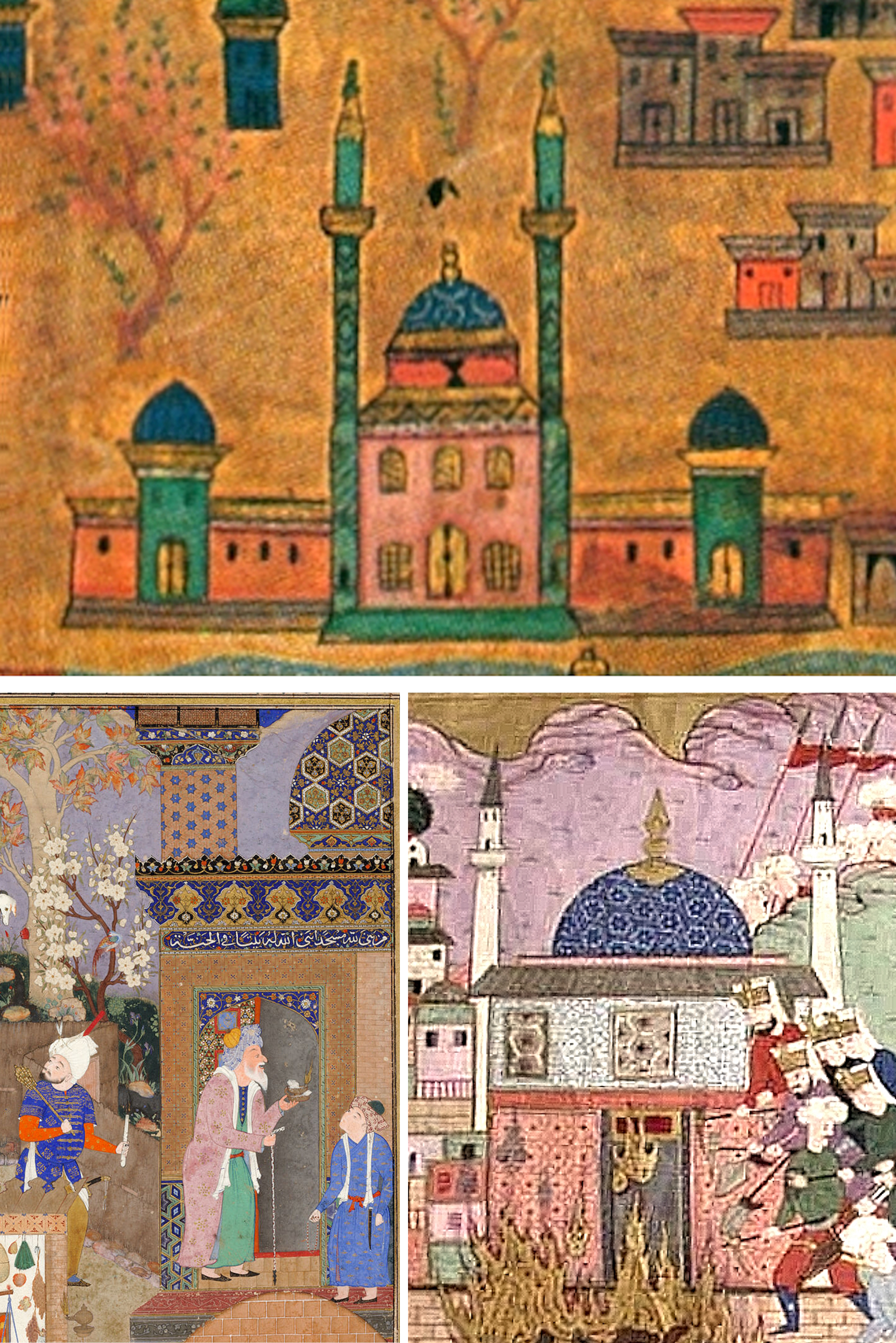
- Uzun Hasan Mosque (depictions from manuscripts dating 1538 to 1620s)

Religion
- Province: Tabriz
- Region: Iran

Location
- Interactive map of Uzun Hasan Mosque

Architecture
- Established: 1477–1484

The Uzun Hasan Mosque, locally known as Hasan Padishah Mosque, was a mosque established by the Aq Qoyunlu ruler Uzun Hasan (ruled 1452–1478) in his capital of Tabriz in Iran circa 1477-78, following his conquest of the city in 1468, and which was completed seven years later, during the reign of his son Sultan Yaʿqub.

The mosque was located in the Nasriyya Complex (comprising a mausoleum, the mosque, a madrasa, and a hospital) on the Sahibabad square in northern Tabriz, next to the vast expanse of the Hasht Behesht Palace. The Sahibabad square (Maydan-i Sahibabad) was founded during the time of the Qara Qoyunlu ruler Jahanshah (r. 1438–67), who also built his own palace, the Hasht Behesht Palace, there before 1466.

The Mosque appears in several miniatures of the period, including in Nighttime in a City, describing the Safavid court and urban environment of the capital of Tabriz, painted circa 1540 by Mir Sayyid Ali for Shah Tahmasp I.

The mosque was large and splendid, with two minarets. Uzun Hasan and his son Yaqub were buried there.

The Ottoman painter and mapmaker Matrakçı Nasuh (d. 1564), who followed the Ottoman sultan Süleyman in his military campaigns in Iran and Iraq between 1533 and 1536, made a famous illustrated map of Tabriz and its monuments, in which the Uzun Hasan Mosque appears prominently.

The Mosque was damaged when the Ottomans besieged the Tabriz castle in 1585, as the mosque seems to have been used as a staging point during the conflict.

The Mosque of Uzun Hasan was one of the only buildings to survive the near destruction of the city of Tabriz by the Ottoman Sultan Murad IV, who entered Tabriz on 12 September 1635 and ordered to "knock down Tabriz", and had all the fortifications and most buildings levelled down.

In 1673, the French traveler Chevalier de Chardin recorded the Uzun Hasan Mosque in his illustrated panorama of Tabriz.

The earthquake of 1780 severely damaged the entire Nasriyya Complex, which was rebuilt in 1826, by Mirza Mahdi Qadi, a descendant of Uzun Hasan. But mention of the Uzun Hasan Mosque seems to vanish from that time.

The location of the ancient mosque has been identified, but very little remains of the mosque today, mainly ruins and tileworks, with examples of “blue-and-white” ornaments, lusterware, and gilded cobalt tiles. Several ground-level alcoves and a few pillars from the original structure remain.

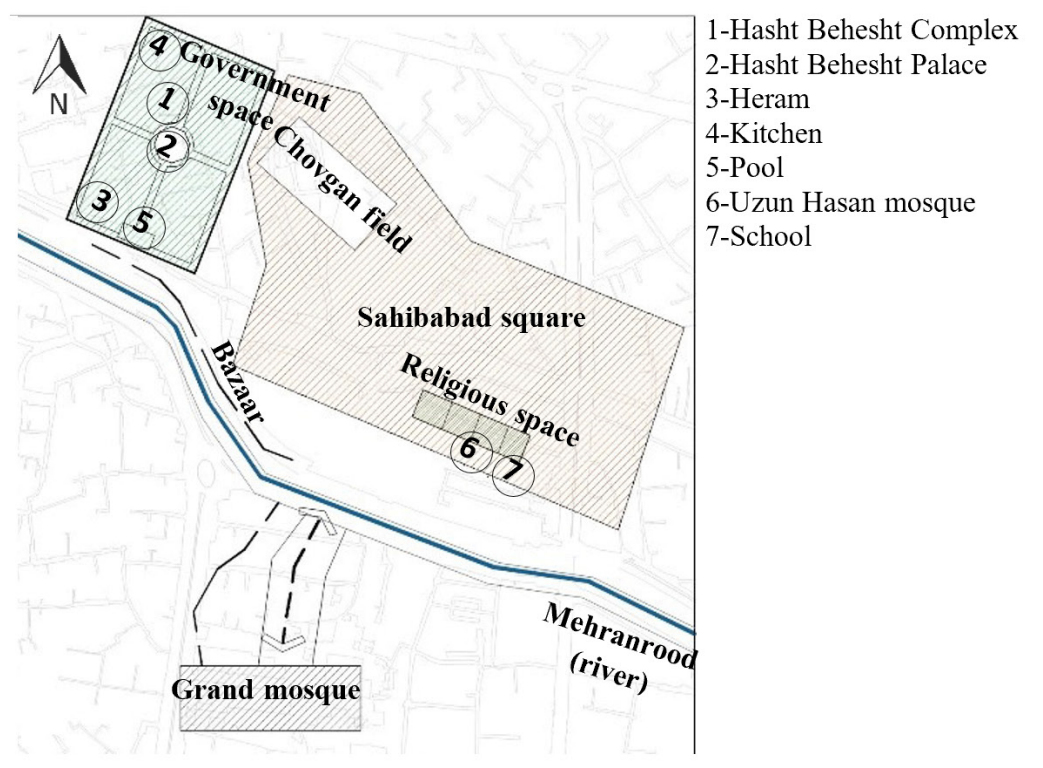
Location in ancient Tabriz

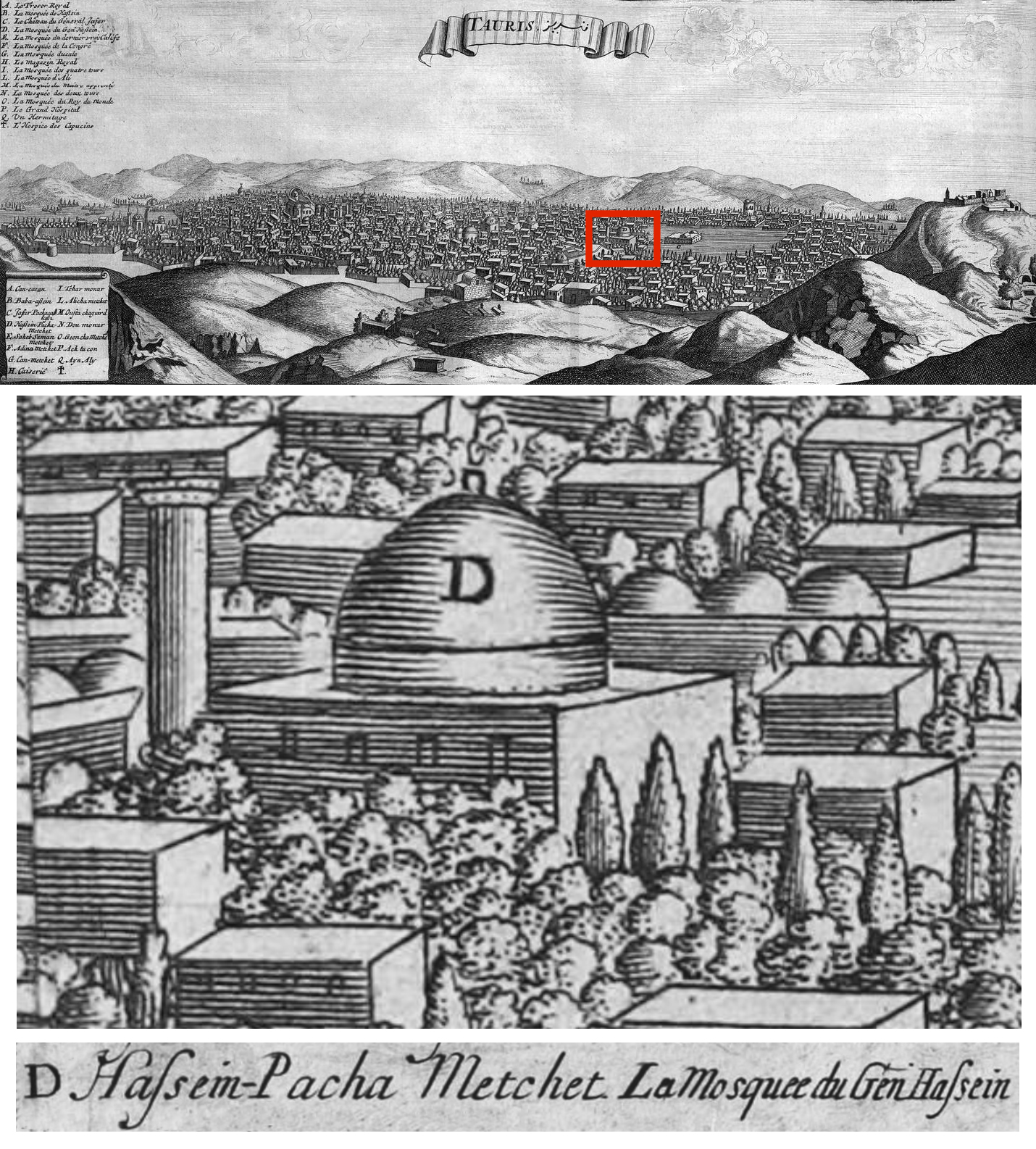
The Uzun Hasan Mosque in 1673, by Chevalier de Chardin

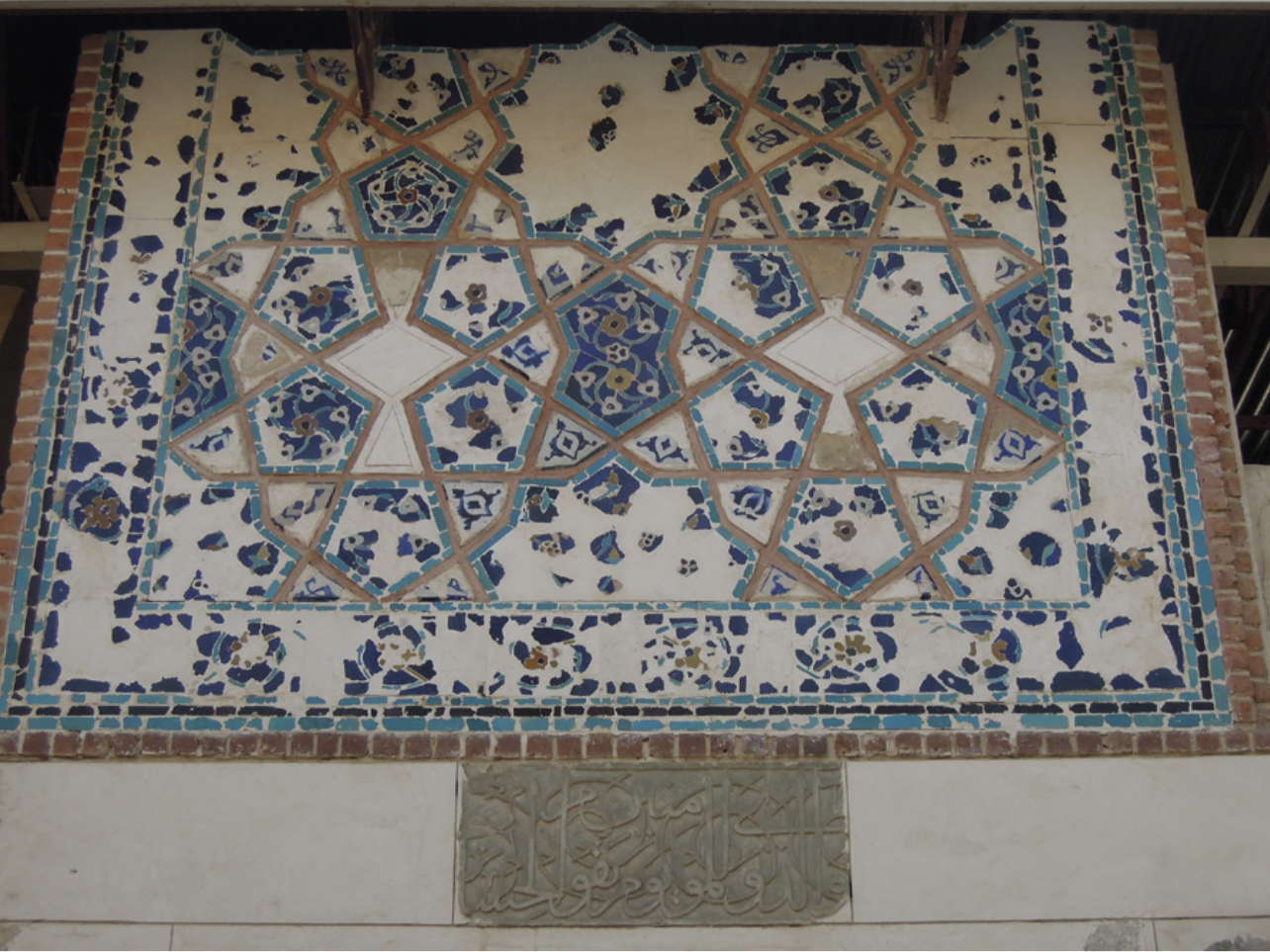
Tileworks from the Uzun Hasan Mosque

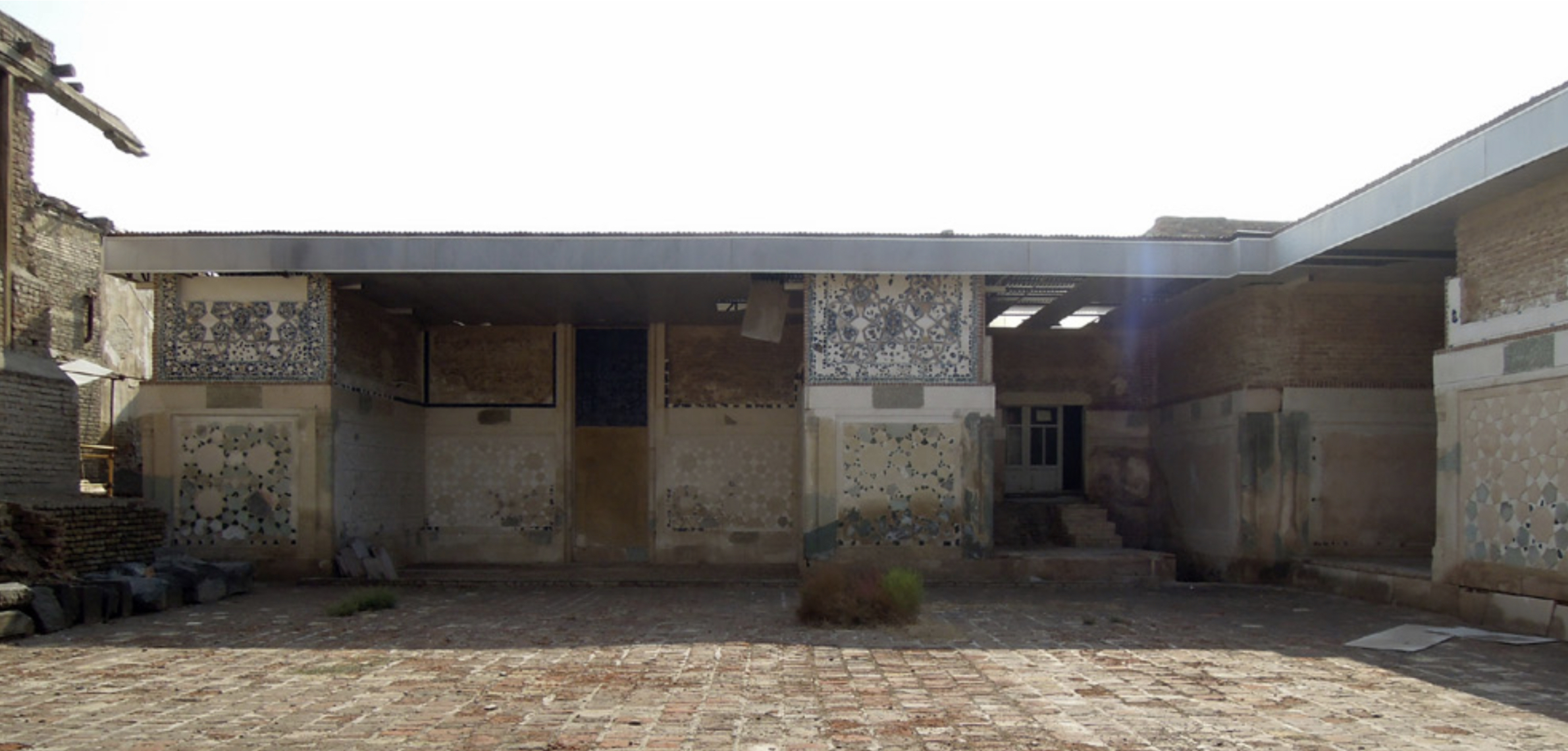
Ground-level structure of the mosque today, with original alcoves and pillars.

== See also ==
- Tabrizi tradition

== Sources ==
- Aube, Sandra (2016). "The Uzun Hasan Mosque in Tabriz: New Perspectives on a Tabrizi Ceramic Tile Workshop". Muqarnas Online. 33 (1): 33–62. doi:10.1163/22118993_03301P004.
- Lambton, Ann Katherine Swynford; Lewis, Bernard; Holt, P.M., eds. (1985). The Cambridge History of Islam. Vol. 2. Cambridge University Press.
- Langaroodi, Reza Rezazadeh; Negahban, Farzin (2015). "Āq-qūyūnlū". In Madelung, Wilferd; Daftary, Farhad (eds.). Encyclopaedia Islamica Online. Brill Online. ISSN 1875-9831.
- Melville, Charles (25 February 2021). Safavid Persia in the Age of Empires: The Idea of Iran Vol. 10. Bloomsbury Publishing. ISBN 978-0-7556-3379-1.
- Minorsky, V. (1960). "Aḳ Ḳoyunlu". In Gibb, H. A. R.; Kramers, J. H.; Lévi-Provençal, E.; Schacht, J.; Lewis, B. & Pellat, Ch. (eds.). The Encyclopaedia of Islam, Second Edition. Volume I: A–B. Leiden: E. J. Brill. pp. 311–312. OCLC 495469456.
- Minorsky, V. & Bosworth, C.E. (2000). "Uzun Ḥasan". In Bearman, P. J.; Bianquis, Th.; Bosworth, C. E.; van Donzel, E. & Heinrichs, W. P. (eds.). The Encyclopaedia of Islam, Second Edition. Volume X: T–U. Leiden: E. J. Brill. pp. 963–967. ISBN 978-90-04-11211-7.
- Quiring-Zoche, R. (1986). "Aq Qoyunlū". Encyclopaedia Iranica, Vol. II, Fasc. 2. pp. 163–168.
