= Battle of Nakhiduri =

1599 battle

Date	1599
Location	Nakhiduri, Kvemo Kartli, Georgia
Result	Ottoman victory

Belligerents
Ottoman Empire	Kingdom of Kartli

Commanders and leaders
Jafar Pasha	Simon I of Kartli (POW)

Casualties and losses
Unknown	Heavy

The Battle of Nakhiduri (Georgian: ნახიდურის ბრძოლა) was a battle between Simon I of the Kingdom of Kartli and the Ottoman forces of Jafar Pasha, beylerbey of Tabriz.

== Background ==
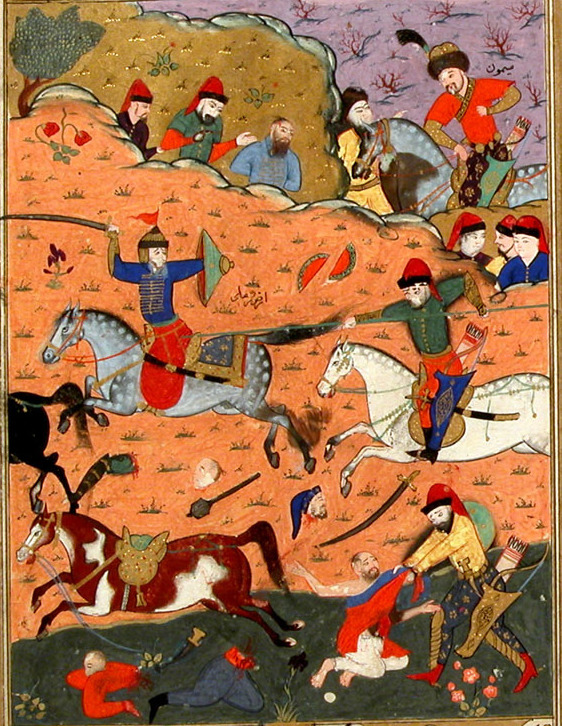
Simon I of Kartli (top right) and his Georgian troops fighting off the Ottoman forces of the Erzurum Bey (left) in 1579. Şeca'atname (1586)

In 1598 Simon I of Kartli rebelled against the Ottoman Empire and ceased his annual tribute payments. Simon I took back the fortress of Gori from the Ottomans after a nine month long siege, as a result the Ottomans feared that revolts would spread throughout other regions of the southern Caucasus. The Ottomans immediately took action and launched a punitive expedition against Simon I. The Ottomans sent Jafar Pasha, the beylerbey of Tabriz against the Georgians.

== Battle ==
When King Simon I learnt that an Ottoman army was marching against him, he went out to face them. The Ottomans marched into the Algeti valley where a Georgian army gathered at Nakhiduri. A major battle took place at Nakhiduri and King Simon I led the initial charge. After five hours of fighting the Ottomans defeated the Georgians and the Georgians were forced to flee the battlefield. During the pursuit of the Georgians by the Ottomans, King Simon I was captured by the Turks near the village of Partskhisi.

== Aftermath ==
King Simon, who was taken captive, was brought to Istanbul and imprisoned in Yedikule. He died in captivity in 1611.
