= Hasht Behesht Palace (Tabriz) =

Palace in Tabriz, Iran

Coordinates: 38.088778°N 46.290944°E

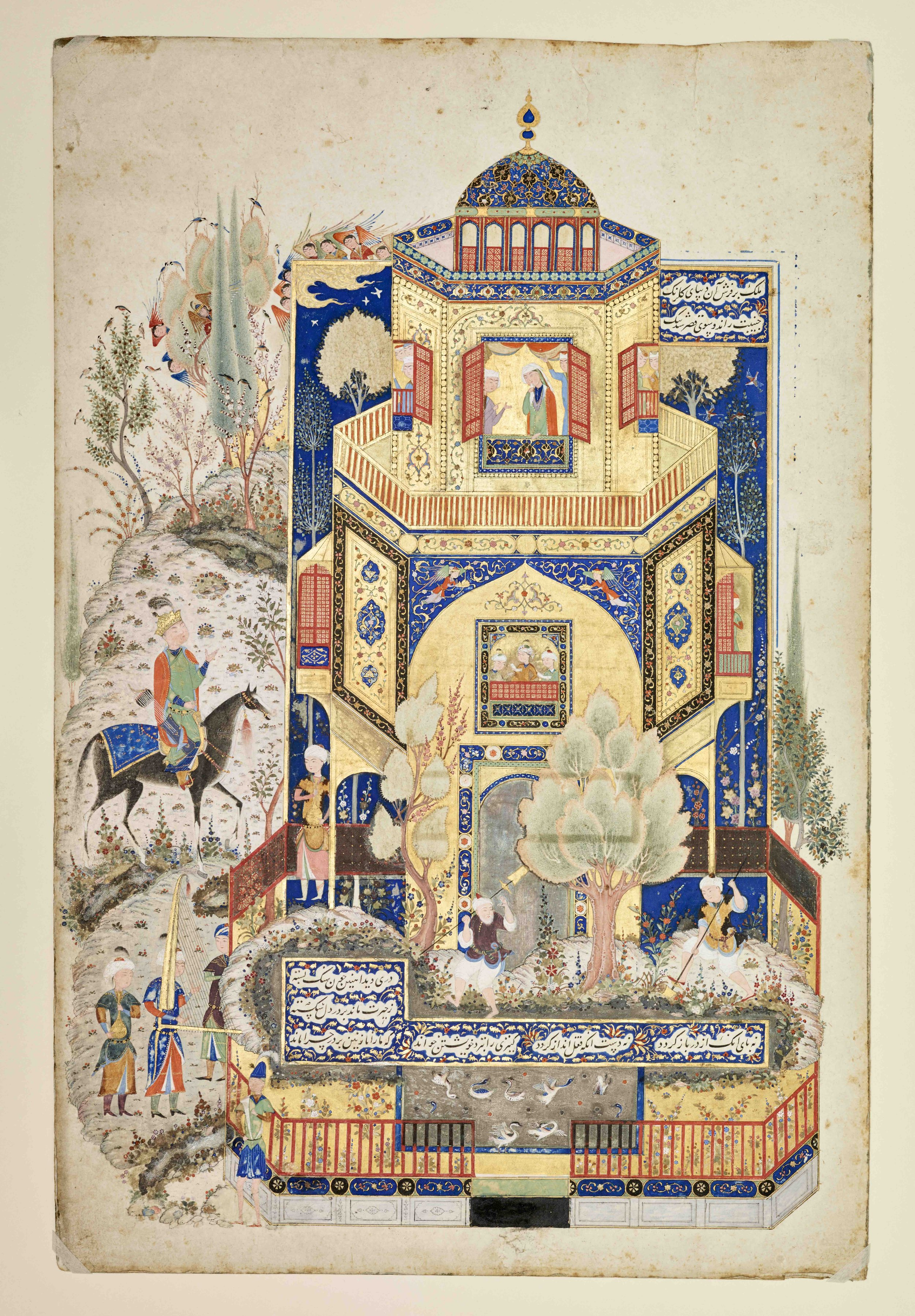
The celebrated Hasht Behesht ("Eight Paradises") Palace in Tabriz was started by Uzun Hasan and completed by his son Yaqub Beg. Khamsa of Nizami (Tabriz, 1481) (Aq Qoyunlu manuscript commissioned by Yaqub Beg).

The Hasht Behesht Palace (Persian: کاخ هشت‌بهشت, lit. 'Palace of the Eight Paradises') was a palace in the northern part of the city of Tabriz started by the Aq Qoyunlu ruler Uzun Hasan (r.1452–1478) and completed by his son Yaqub Beg (r.1478–1490). Its completion is generally dated to 1483–1486.

Probably built upon an earlier structure by Jahan Shah, the Sahebabad Garden of Tabriz with the Hasht Behesht Palace at its center became the dynastic center of the Aq Qoyunlu capital of Tabriz.

The Palace was visited around 1510 by Domenico Romano, a Venetian merchant, who left an elogious and lengthy description. He described the building as an octagon some 63 to 72 meters in circumference (equivalent to 20–23 meters in diameter) two stories tall and topped by a dome, that included a hall surrounded by thirty-two chambers, with several terraces. The Venetian marvelled "this building, on the ground floor, has four entrances, with many more apartments, all enameled and gilt in various ways, and so beautiful that I can hardly find words to express it."

The palace was also decorated with many descriptive scenes of past events, all in realistic style, including the visit of an Ottoman embassy to Uzun Hasan, or his hunting expeditions. The general color palette used gold, silver, and ultramarine blue.

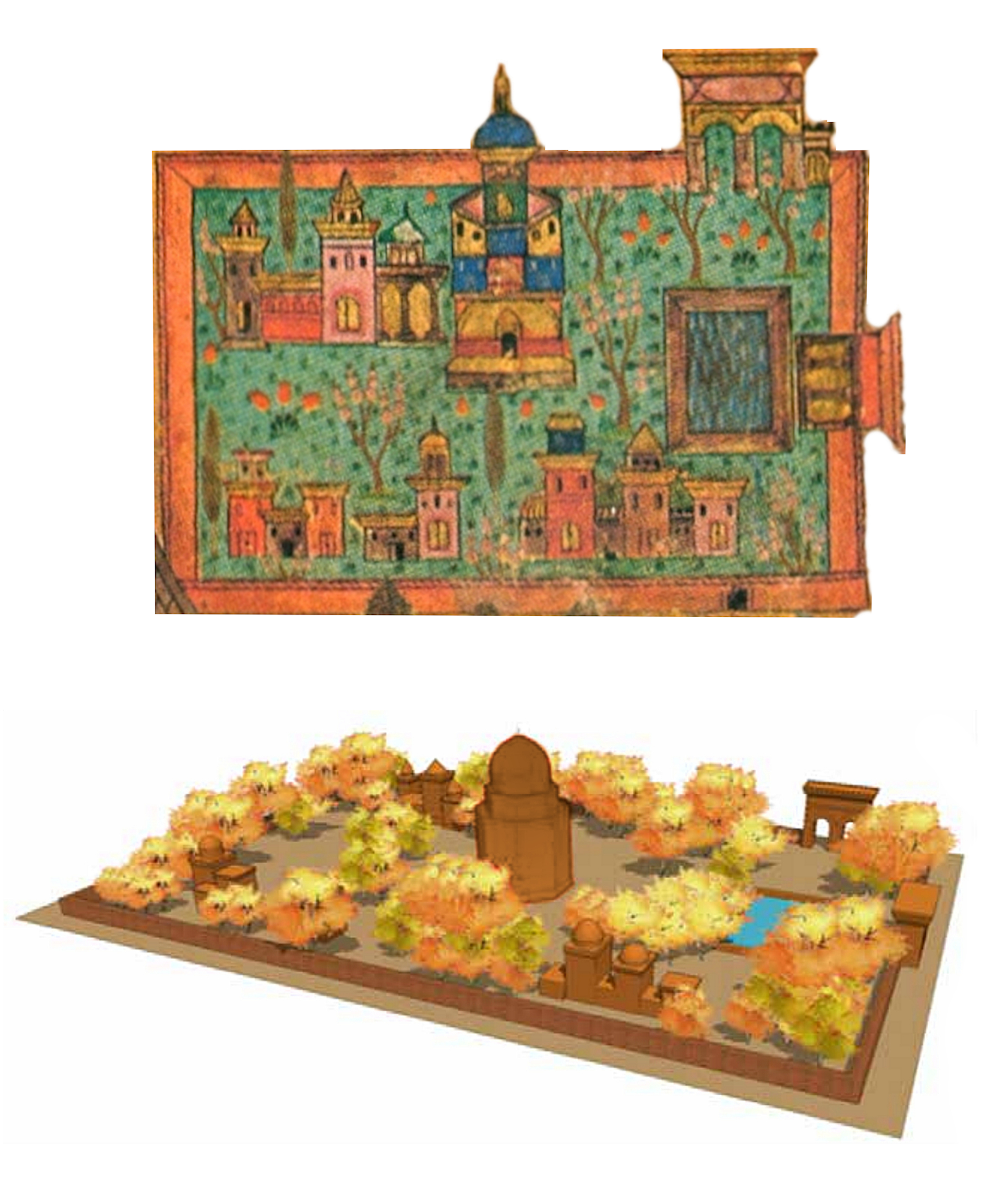
Hasht Behesht Palace at the center of the Sahebabad Garden of Tabriz (detail of 1538 map by Matrakçı Nasuh, and modern 3D simulation).

The Palace appears in various documents of the period, such as the 1538 map of Tabriz by the Ottoman geographer Matrakçı Nasuh.

The Hasht Behesht Palace is also known to appear in the miniatures of some manuscripts of the period, particularly the famous scene of "Khusraw at Shirin's Palace" in the Khamsa of Nizami completed in 1481 in Tabriz and commissioned by Yaqub Beg.

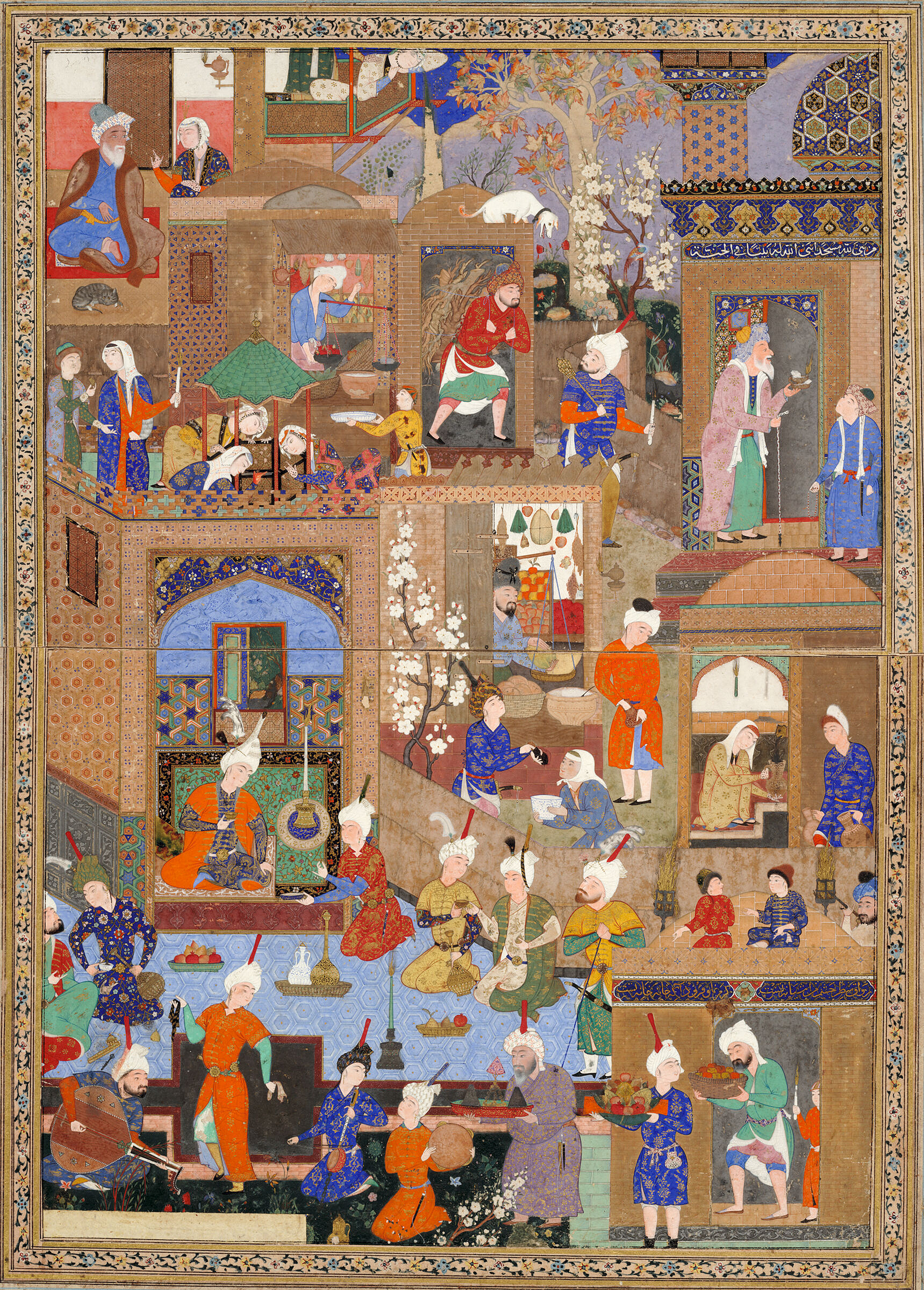
Nighttime in a City: Safavid court at the Hasht Behesht Palace, with urban environment of the capital of Tabriz, painted circa 1540 for Shah Tahmasp (Sackler Museum, 1958.76).

The new Safavid ruler Shah Ismail I resided in the palace following his occupation of Tabriz in the early 16th century.

The Hasht Behesht Palace was briefly occupied and looted by the Ottomans following the Battle of Tabriz (1514): many precious goods from the palace, and artists from the Tabriz court, were sent to Istanbul.

The Palace appears in schematic form in some early Safavid paintings such as Nighttime in a City, dated circa 1540 from Tabriz.

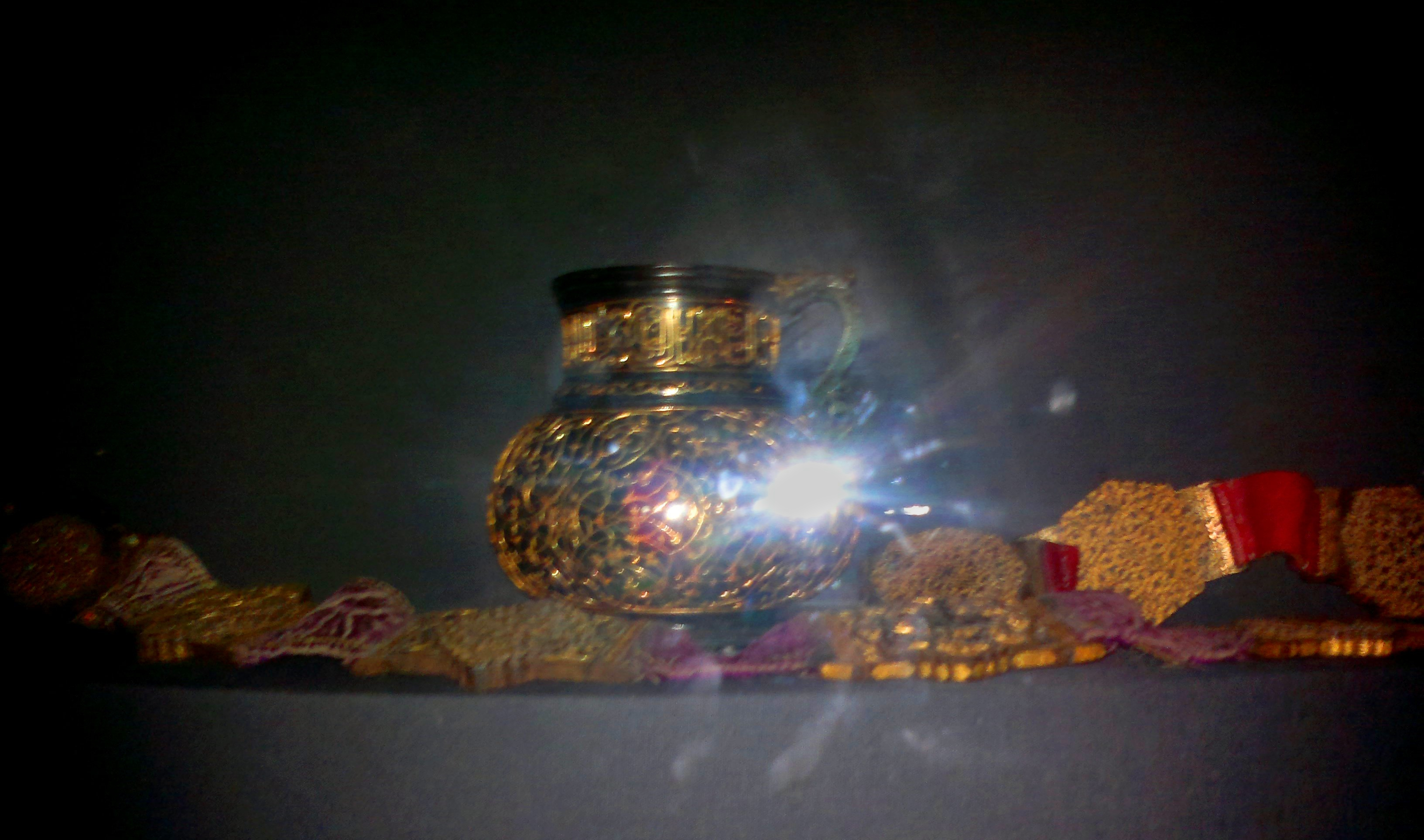
Personal items of Shah Ismail I captured by Selim I at Hasht Behesht Palace in 1514 after the Battle of Chaldiran. Topkapi Museum, Istanbul.

The Palace was destroyed by the Ottoman Jafar Pasha in 1585, and replaced by the Castle of Jafar Pasha, a massive defensive structure. Nevertheless, the Hasht Behesht Palace was massively influential in the creation of other buildings in Iran, such as the Hasht Behesht in Isfahan, and contributed to the "Hasht Bihisht" model of architecture.

== Sources ==
- Melville, Charles (25 February 2021). Safavid Persia in the Age of Empires: The Idea of Iran Vol. 10. Bloomsbury Publishing. ISBN 978-0-7556-3379-1.
