= Tabrizi tradition =

Architectural style from Iran from the 14th century

Tabrizi tradition, Tabrizi workshop, was an architectural style that originated in Tabriz during the Ilkhanate. By the 1330s, a workshop was established in Cairo teaching the Tabrizi tradition of ceramic tile, including the construction and decoration of minarets. By the 1400s, Tabrizi craftsmen were working in the Ottoman Empire constructing the Green Mosque, Bursa, which has similarities to the Blue Mosque in Tabriz and the Muradiye Complex in Bursa. After the sacking of Tabriz, the Ottoman sultan Selim I brought Tabrizi craftsmen to Istanbul to start a royal ceramic workshop based on Tabrizi traditions.

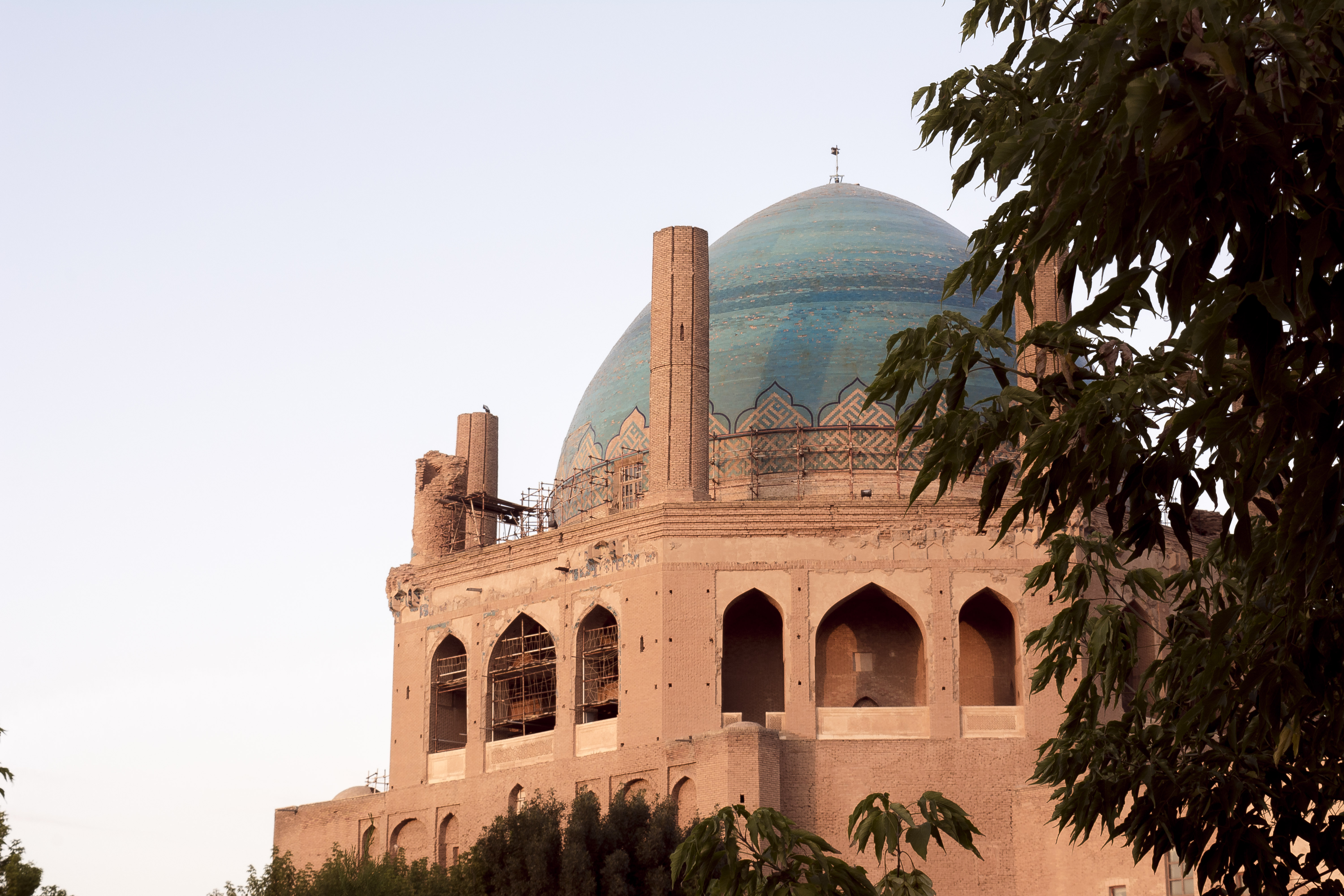
Tomb of Öljaitü at Sultaniyya

== Achievements ==
Under Ilkhanid rule, Tabriz became a significant hub of commerce linked with key trade routes in Anatolia. The city received considerable support from the Ilkhanids and later the Qara Qoyunlu and Aq Qoyunlu dynasties, with tilework playing a major role in its architectural identity. Due to its cultural prominence, artists of the period may have used Tabrizi nisbas as a form of self-promotion.

In the early 1300s, Tabrizi craftsmen had developed multicolor tile mosaic. These multicolored mosaics are found at the tomb complex at Ghazaniyya (light and dark blue) built by Ilkhanid sultan Ghazan, Rab'-e Rashidi (light and dark blue and black) built c. 1307 and the mausoleum of Oljaytu (light and dark blues) at Soltaniyeh built between 1307 and 1313. The same three colors were used in the construction of the two minarets of al-Nasir's mosque in Cairo. The Tabrizi craftsmen were highly skilled in various tile techniques, including plain or gilt monochrome, under-glaze, cuerda seca, and mosaic-faience.

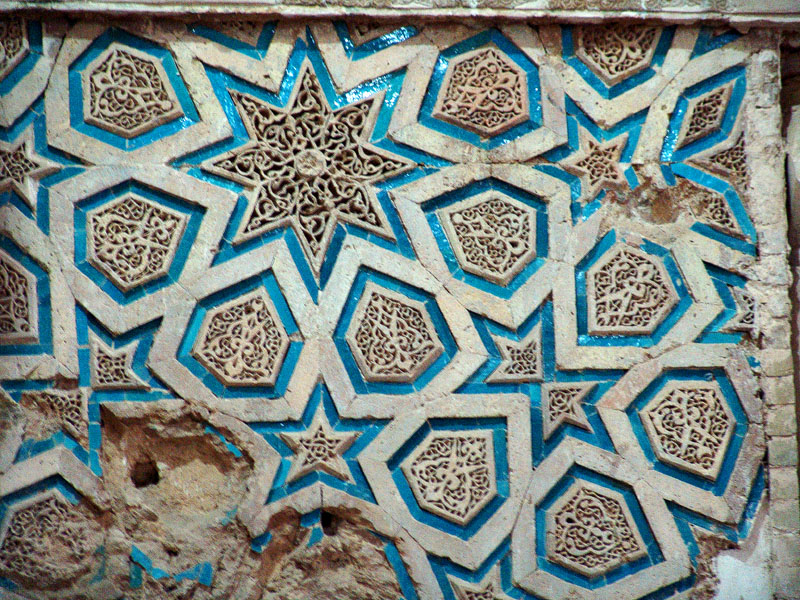
Interior of Öljaitü's tomb

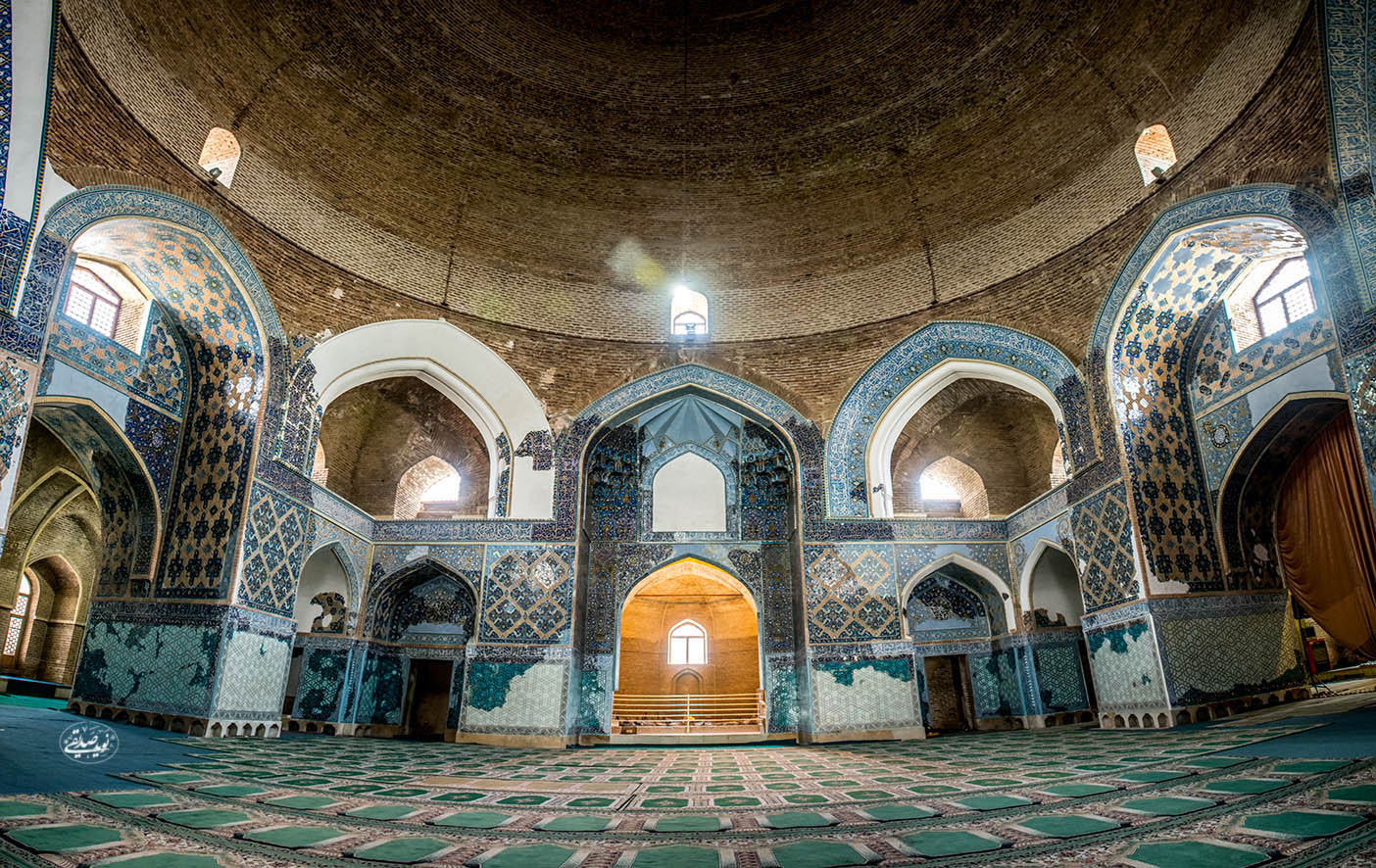
View of the main prayer hall, Blue Mosque, Tabriz, Iran.

Only two monuments from the fifteenth century remain in Tabriz, both significantly damaged, from the Qara Qoyunlu period: the Blue Mosque and the Uzun Hasan Mosque (partially preserved). In 1465, Khatun Jan Begum commissioned the Blue Mosque as a funerary complex for her husband, Jahan Shah. The mosque's tilework is diverse, featuring mosaic tiles alongside blue-and-white pieces; bannāʾī technique (glazed tiles alternating with plain brick); hexagonal dark-blue tiles with gold detailing; and luster tiles. The tile workshop responsible for this mosque demonstrated a range of skills similar to those seen in the Muradiye Complex in Bursa and later in the Istanbul workshop active during the early reign of Sultan Suleiman the Magnificent in the sixteenth century. Two types of blue-and-white tiles have survived from the Blue Mosque of Tabriz: one type includes small square tiles with white geometric or vegetal designs set into brickwork, while the other consists of small, dark-blue triangular tiles adorned with white floral patterns.

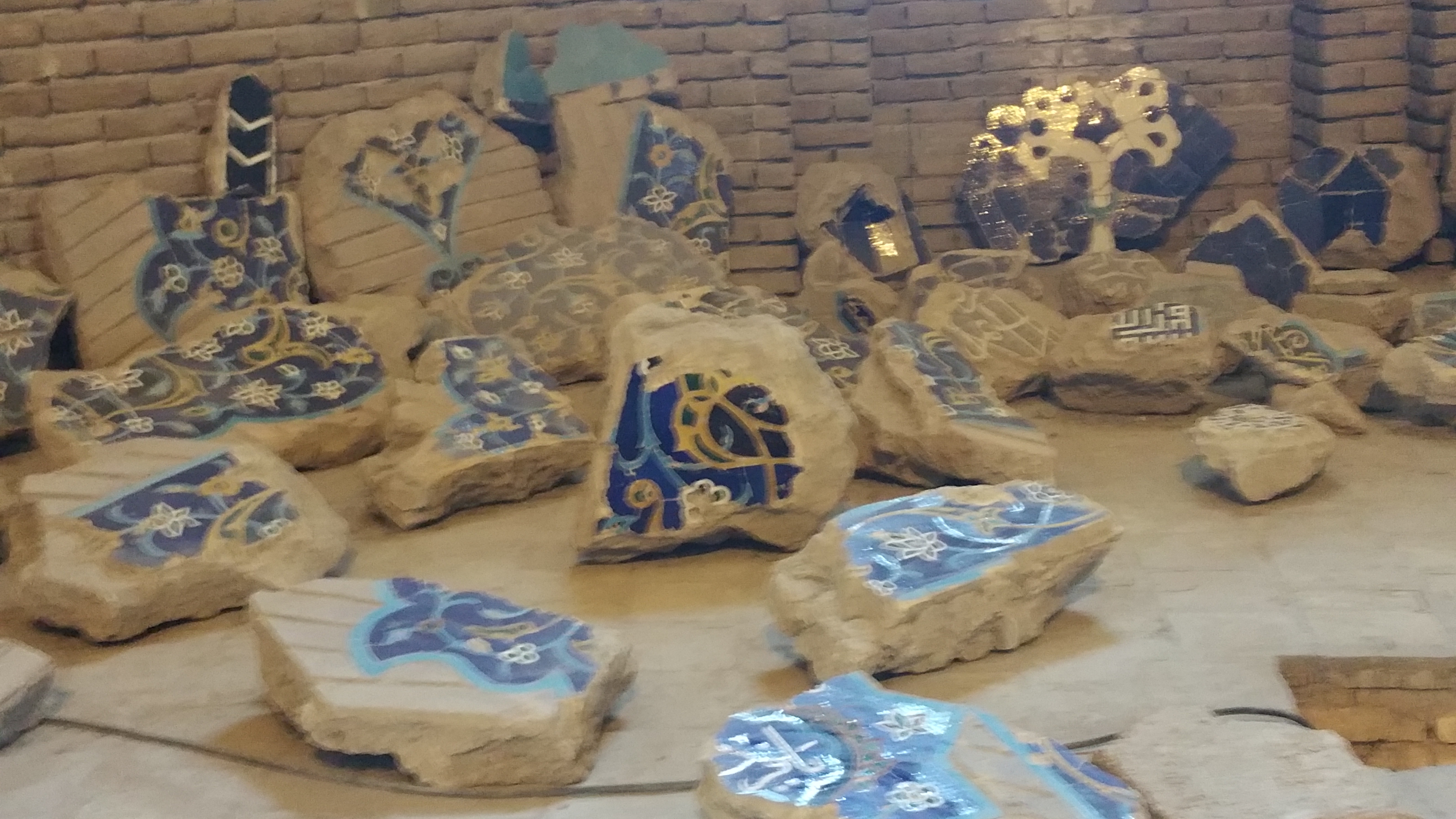
Tiles from the Blue Mosque after 17th century earthquake.

In the Uzun Hasan Mosque, remnants such as inscription fragments, molded leaf motifs, and tiles decorated in blue-on-white and white-on-blue have been uncovered. Some of these tiles also display overglaze-painted outlines, similar to the black-line/cuerda seca style.

== 14th century ==
=== Cairo workshop ===
During 1330, Aitmish brought craftsmen from Tabriz which played a key role in establishing a court workshop in Cairo during the 1330s and 1340s, where they instructed artisans in the Tabrizi tradition. The same masons were responsible for the construction, from 1329 to 1330, of two minarets at Qawsun's mosque in Cairo. (Note: All that survives of the large courtyard mosque built in 1330 by Qawsun, an amir under al-Nasir Muhammad, are a few stucco-grilled windows set into the outer walls and a modest stone-arched northern gate. The majority of the original structure was torn down between 1845 and 1870 to make way for the construction of Muhammad Ali Mosque. The mosque currently standing on the site was entirely reconstructed by ‘Abbas II in 1893.) They modeled them on minarets of Ali Shah's mosque in Tabriz. They are topped with a bulbous crown, which resemble the minarets at the Shrine ofʿAbd al-Samad in Natanz and the Friday mosque at Yazd. (Note: According to Bakhoum, "...the minarets at Yazd unfortunately do not retain much of their original decoration.") The minarets of the Al-Nasir Muhammad mosque (built 1318) at the Cairo Citadel are adorned with navy blue, turquoise, and white mosaic tiles.

The Tabriz tradition influenced Cairene architecture not only in the scale of its buildings and their interiors but also in their decorative style. For example, the lines of the qibla īwān in Sultan Ḥasan's mosque are adorned with a large 2 meter band of finely carved stucco, featuring a Qurʾanic inscription set against a foliate background.

== 15th century ==
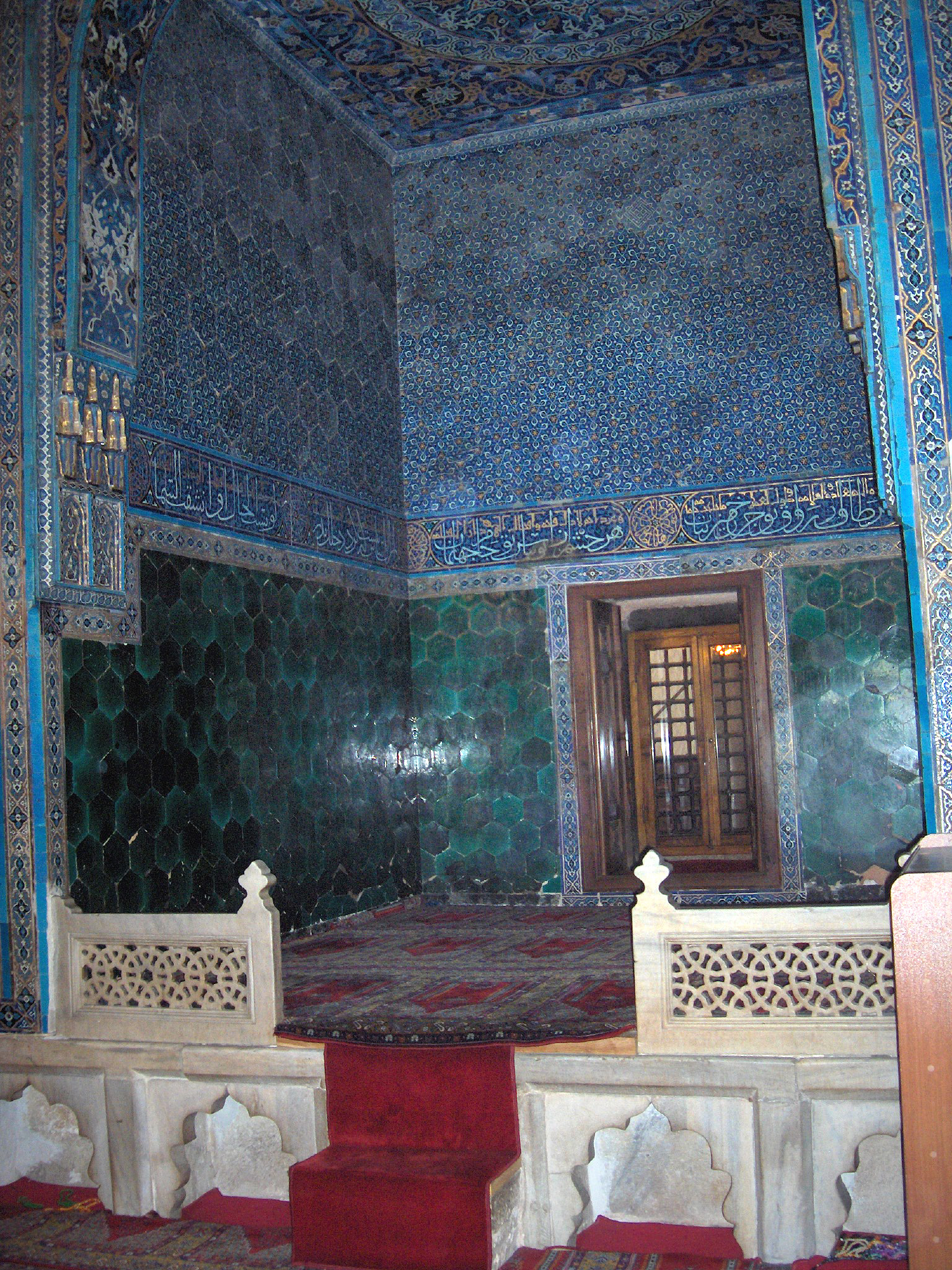
Interior of the Green Mosque: opening to the prayer hall

In the fifteenth century, Tabriz gained widespread recognition for its workshops, particularly for its manuscript production and ceramics. By the century's end, a Tabrizi craftsman was even reported to have tried replicating porcelain, highlighting the vibrant energy of the city's workshops. Craftsmen with the Tabriz nisba carried the reputation of its esteemed workshops as far as Cairo, Damascus, Bursa, and Shahrisabz.

A well-known example of work by Tabrizi émigrés is the Yeşil Cami in Bursa, a tomb complex commissioned by Ottoman Sultan Mehmed I in 1412, with construction completed in 1419–20. Similar to the Blue Mosque in Tabriz, the building originally featured a porch with five domes and is renowned for its extravagant tile decoration on both the exterior and interior. The stunning decoration includes a dado of hexagonal monochrome tiles with stenciled gold patterns and a grand miḥrāb (10 meters in height) with a molded frame and pyramidal muqarnas hood, created using a mix of tile mosaic and underglaze cuerda seca—techniques also used in the Blue Mosque. The tilework is signed on the colonette to the right of the miḥrāb as "work of the masters of Tabriz." (Note: "ʿamal-i ustādhān-i Tabrīz (work of the masters of Tabriz)") The mihrabs in both the convent mosque and the mausoleum of the Yeşil complex share a strong resemblance to the mihrab of the Muradiye Mosque in Edirne. Black-line tiles are also present in the Muradiye Complex, constructed in 1425–26, and are likely products of the same workshop tradition. Patricia Blessing, Stanford professor of art, suggests the signature implies a mobile workshop operating in the Ottoman Empire. The Cem Sultan Mausoleum stands within the cemetery of the Muradiye Complex, a site where the “Masters of Tabriz” had been active in the 1420s. This connection leads Nurhan Atasoy and Julian Raby to propose that the black-line tiles in the Cem Sultan Mausoleum represent the final phase of the waning “Masters of Tabriz” workshop tradition.

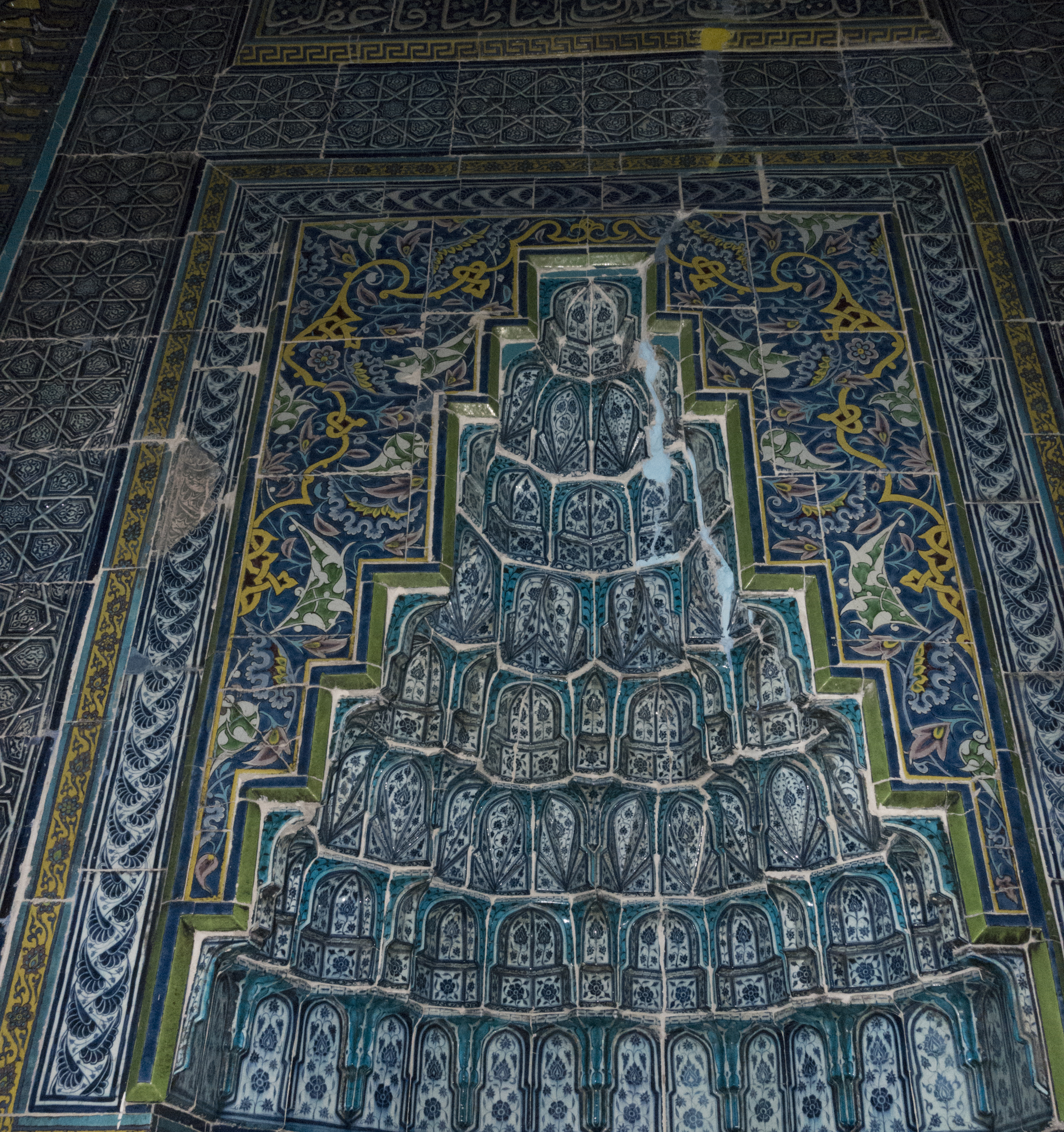
The Mihrab of Muradiye Mosque, Edirne

The tile masters from Tabriz seem to have relocated from Edirne to Istanbul, as suggested by the two remaining polychrome tile lunettes in the courtyard of Mehmed II's mosque. These lunettes, which replicate intricate Cuerda seca designs using the quicker underglaze method, closely resemble the tiles they produced for the Üç Şerefeli Mosque in Edirne.

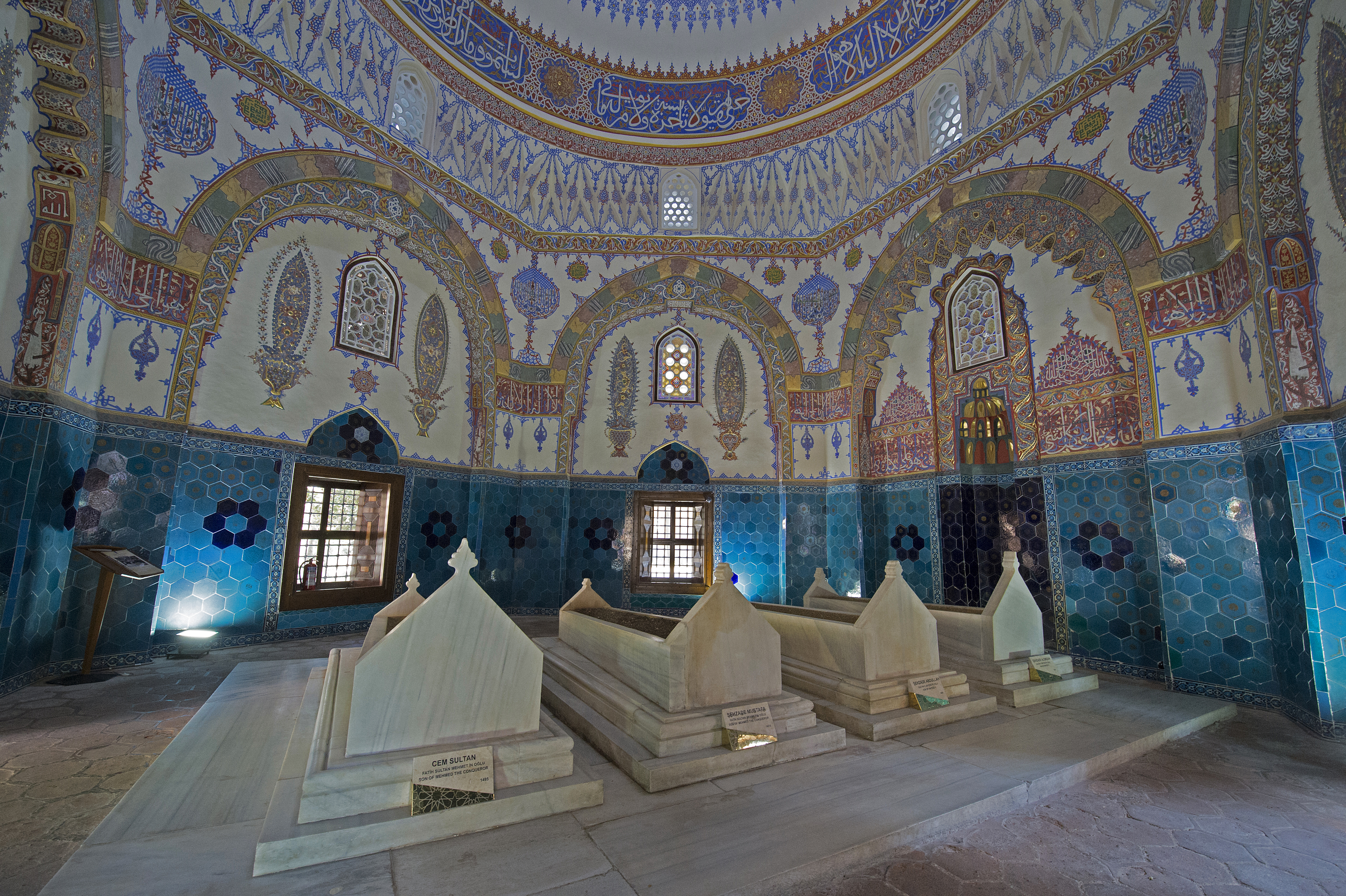
Interior Cem Sultan tomb

The Panja-i 'Ali Mosque in Qom also displays blue-and-white underglaze tile, with a foundation date of 1481–1482.

== 16th century ==
=== Istanbul workshop ===
In the sixteenth century, Tabrizi master craftsmen were brought to Constantinople by Selim I, after he sacked Tabriz. Many of the post-Timurid tile revetments created by the royal ceramics workshop in Istanbul are found on buildings designed by the chief architect Alauddin (Note: Also known as Ali of Iran.) who served from the later years of Selim I's rule until his death in 1538. During Alauddin's tenure, the royal ceramics workshop, steeped in Tabrizi traditions, thrived in a supportive artistic climate under his guidance. The limited but technically and stylistically diverse tiles made in the royal ceramics workshop of Istanbul, featuring various color schemes, maintained a consistently high standard of quality—unlike Iznik tiles, whose quality fluctuated depending on the extent of patronage.

== Sources ==
- Aube, Sandra (2016). "The Uzun Hasan Mosque in Tabriz: New Perspectives on a Tabrizi Ceramic Tile Workshop". Muqarnas. 33: 33–62.
- Bakhoum, Diana Isaac (2016). "The Foundation of a Tabrizi Workshop in Cairo". Muqarnas. 33. Brill: 17–32.
- Blair, Sheila S. (2014). "Tabriz: International Entrepot under the Mongols". In Pfeiffer, Judith (ed.). Politics, Patronage and the Transmission of Knowledge in 13th–15th Century Tabriz. Brill. pp. 321–356. ISBN 9789004262577.
- Blessing, Patricia (2019). "The Blue-and-White Tiles of the Muradiye in Edirne: Architectural Decoration between Tabriz, Damascus, and Cairo". Muqarnas. 36: 101–129.
- Fetvacı, Emine (2013). Picturing History at the Ottoman Court. Indiana University Press. ISBN 9780253051011.
- Necipoglu, Gulru (1990). "From International Timurid to Ottoman: A Change of Taste in Sixteenth-Century Ceramic Tiles". Muqarnas. 7. Brill: 136–170.
- Williams, Caroline (2008). Islamic monuments in Cairo : The Practical Guide. American University in Cairo Press. ISBN 9789774242908.
