= Hasht Bihisht (architecture) =

Type of floor plan common in Mughal India

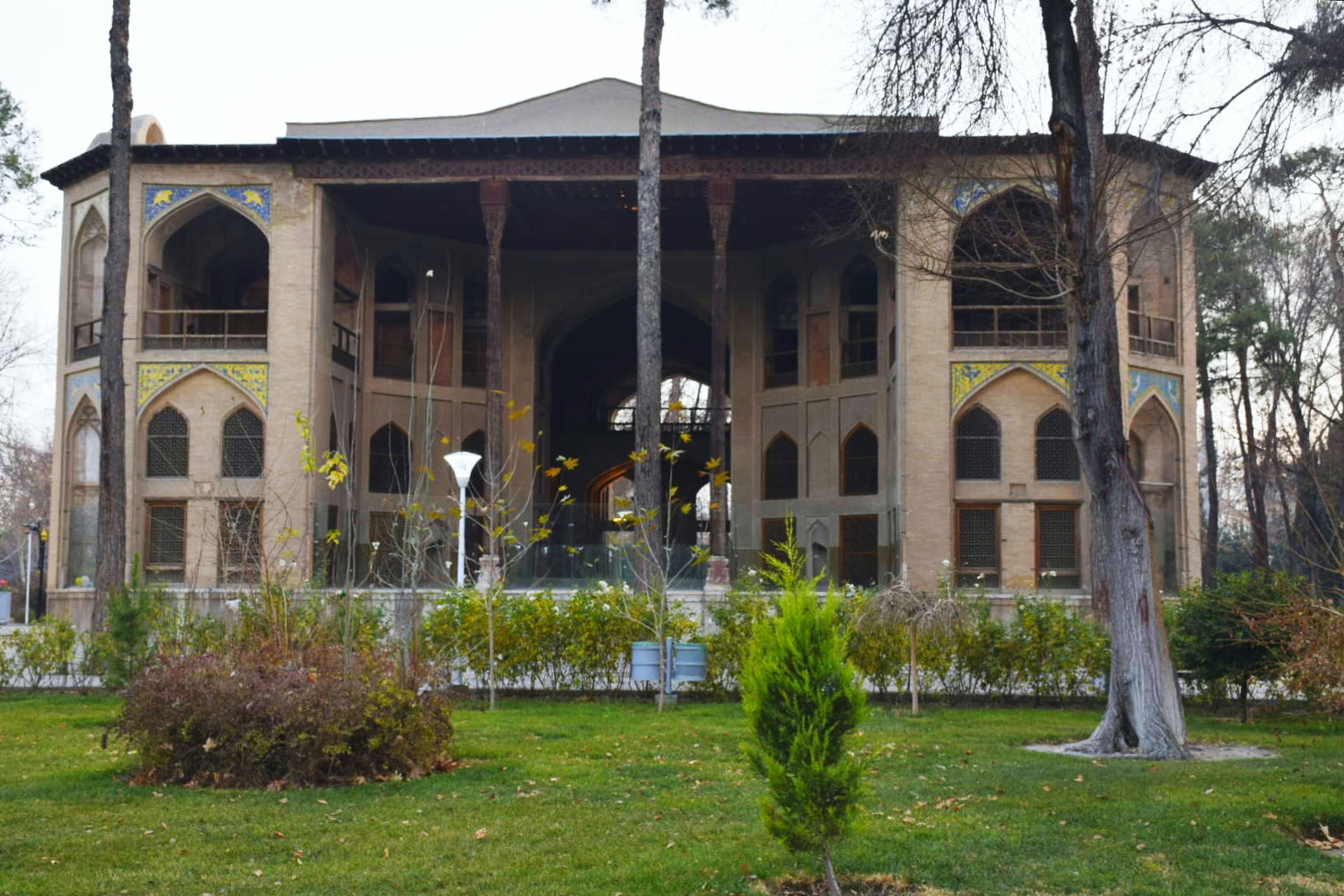
Hasht Behesht, a Safavid era pavilion in Isfahan, Iran.

In architecture, a hasht-behesht (Persian: هشت‌بهشت, romanized: hašt-behešt, lit. 'eight heavens') is a type of floor plan consisting of a central hall surrounded by eight rooms, the earliest recognized example of which in Iranian architecture is traced to the time of the Persianate Timurid Empire. The term was used in Persian literature as a metaphorical image, and was later notably used in a poem by Indian poet Amir Khusrow, who gave the most comprehensible literary reconstruction of the model in his adaptation of an Iranian epic about Sasanian ruler Bahram V, as well as in other works by Ottoman poets Sehi Bey and Idris Bitlisi. The architectural form was adopted and used also in Ottoman and Mughal architectures.

The concept of hasht-behesht is linked to that of the Avestan vahišta (Avestan for "best"; cognate with Middle Persian wahišt, New Persian behešt), a building decorated with precious stones that would represent the astrological concept of eight planets corresponding to eight heavens. It is closely related to Islamic eschatology, in which heaven is described as having eight gates and eight spaces, and is also observed in Christian symbolism in the concept of salvation. Similarly, the Chinese magic square, which was employed for numerous purposes, finds its way into Islamic mathematicians as "wafq". Ninefold schemes find particular resonance in the Indian mandalas, the cosmic maps of Hinduism and Buddhism.

== Iran ==
Although the trace of an older Sasanian equivalent is presumed, the earliest recognized use of the hasht-behesht plan is traced to a now non-extant two-storied pavilion named Tarab-khana that was built under the reign of the Persianate Timurid Empire ruler Babur Mirza (1449–1457) in Herat, a prominent city in medieval Khorasan.

Later, under the Aq Qoyunlu, a plan was used in the eponymous pavilion of Hasht Behesht Palace in Tabriz, completed in 1483–1486. Later again, under the reign of Iran's Safavid dynasty, the same plan was used in the eponymous pavilion of Hasht Behesht in Isfahan.

Floor plan of the Taj Mahal, showing eight chambers surrounding a central chamber.

== Mughal India ==
In the architecture of the Persianate Mughal Empire, hasht-behesht was the favorite plan for gardens and pavilions, as well as for mausolea (seen as a funerary form of pavilion). These were planned as square or rectangular buildings divided into nine sections, with a central domed chamber surrounded by eight elements. Later, developments of the hasht-behesht divided the square at 45 degree angles to create a more radial plan, which often also includes chamfered corners; examples of which can be found in Todar Mal's Baradari at Fatehpur Sikri and Humayun's Tomb. Each element of the plan is reflected in the elevations with iwans and the corner rooms expressed through smaller arched niches. Such structures are often topped with chattris, small pillared pavilions at each corner.
