= Hasht Behesht =

Pavilion in Isfahan, Iran

Hasht Behesht کاخ هشت بهشت
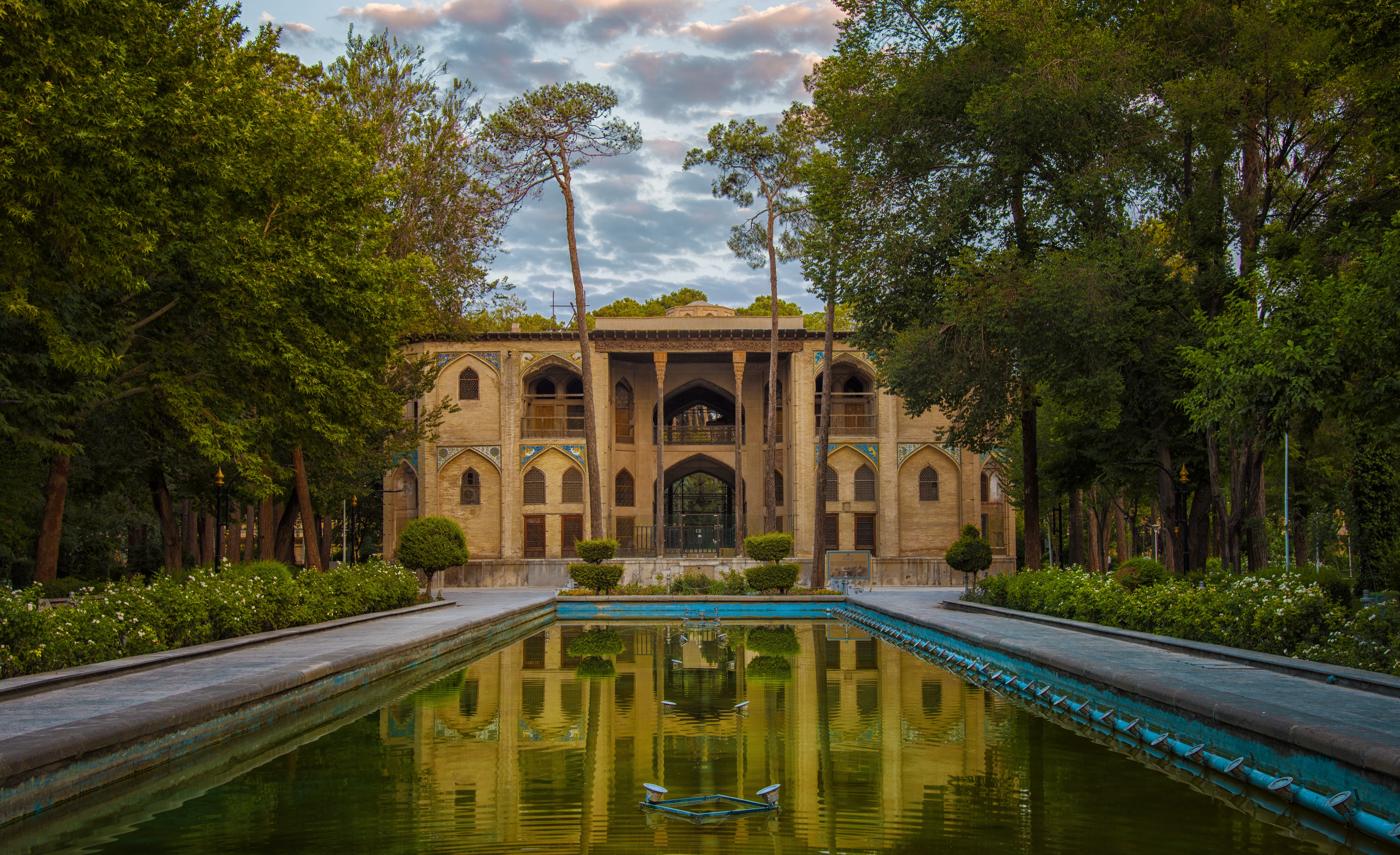

General information
- Architectural style: Iranian
- Location: Isfahan, Iran
- Coordinates: 32.6534°N 51.6702°E

Iran National Heritage List
- Official name: Hasht Behesht
- Type: Pavilion
- Designated: 1935
- Reference no.: 227
- Conservation organization: Cultural Heritage, Handicrafts and Tourism Organization of Iran

Hasht Behesht or Hasht-Behesht (Persian: هشت‌بهشت, romanized: Hašt-Behešt, lit. 'the Eight Heavens') is a 17th-century pavilion in Isfahan, Iran. It was built by the order of Suleiman I, the eighth shah of Safavid Iran, and functioned mainly as a private pavilion. It is located in Isfahan's famous Charbagh Street. It was also the first modern school in Isfahan called His Majesty's School (Madrese-ye Homayouni).

== Structure ==
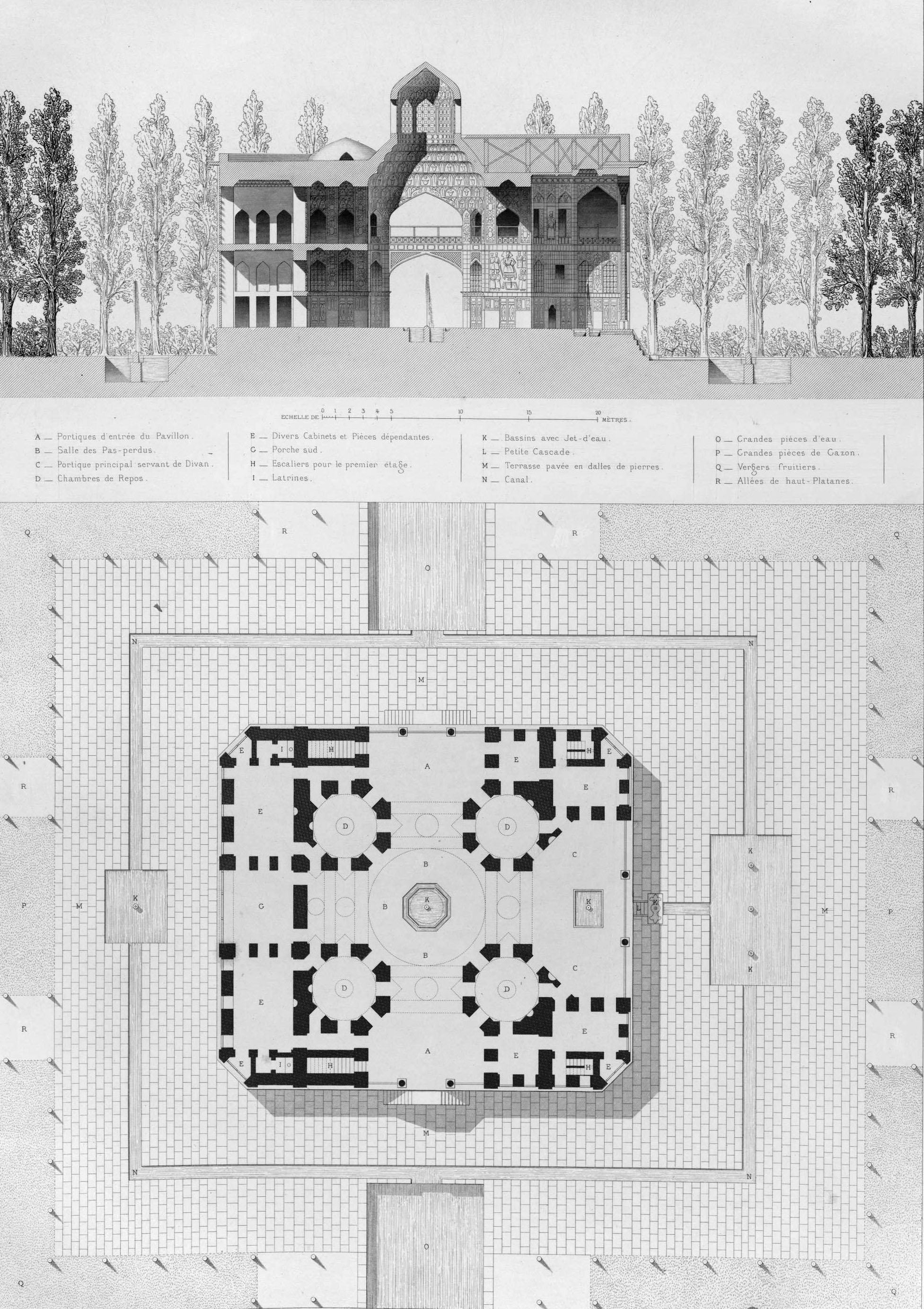
The plan of Hasht Behesht by French artist Pascal Coste, 1840

As indicated on its name, the two-story pavilion of Hasht Behesht was built on the hasht-behesht plan, that is a type of floor plan consisting of a central hall surrounded by eight rooms. The building is of an octagonal shape, and has two main entrances. Four larger sides of it feature large balconies (iwans), under which some tall and thin wooden columns are raised.

The pavilion is decorated with mural paintings, perforated woodwork, ayeneh-kari, tilework, and plasterwork.

== Gallery ==
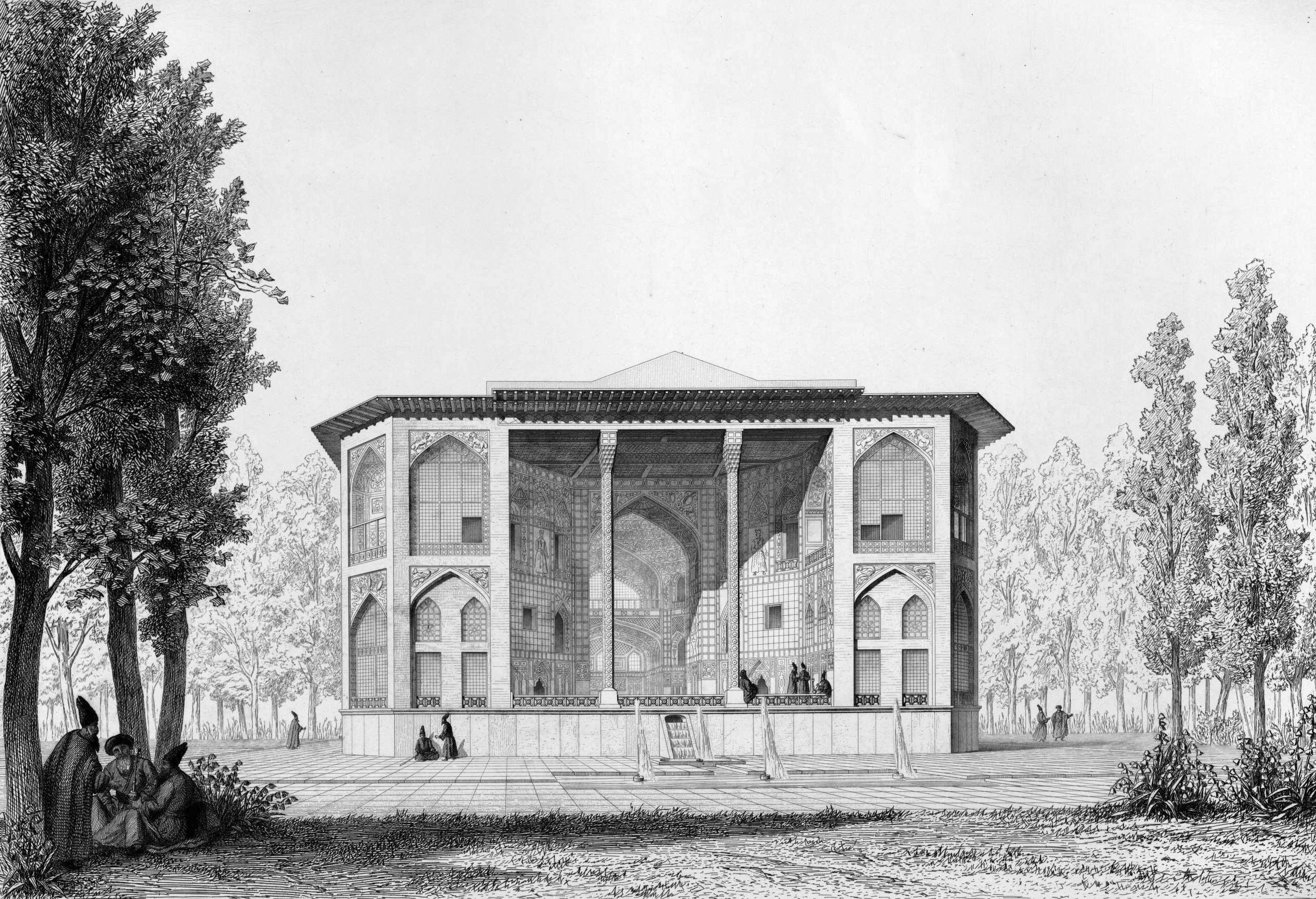
An 1840 drawing of Hasht Behesht by French artist Pascal Coste

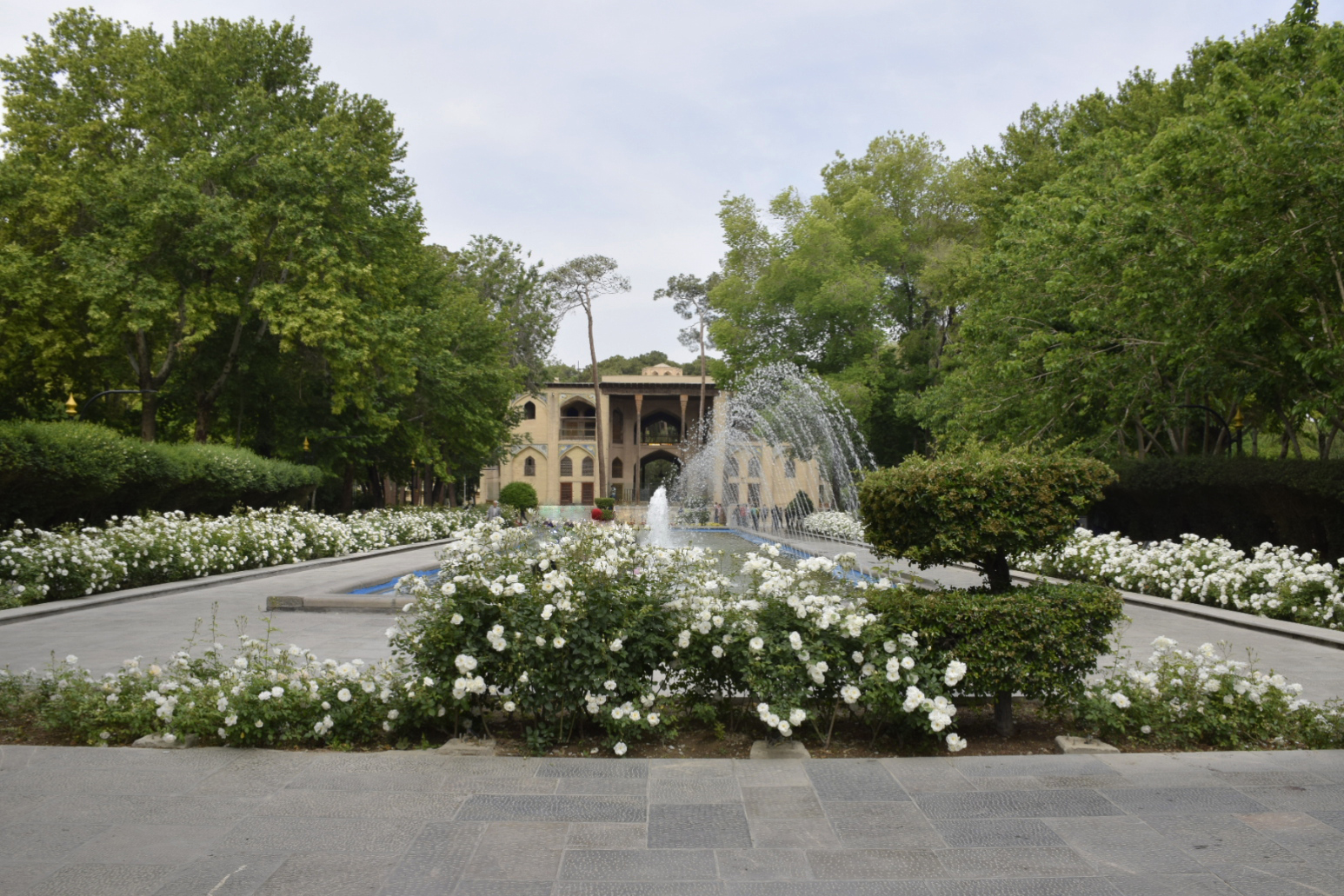
Hasht Behesht seen from behind the pool

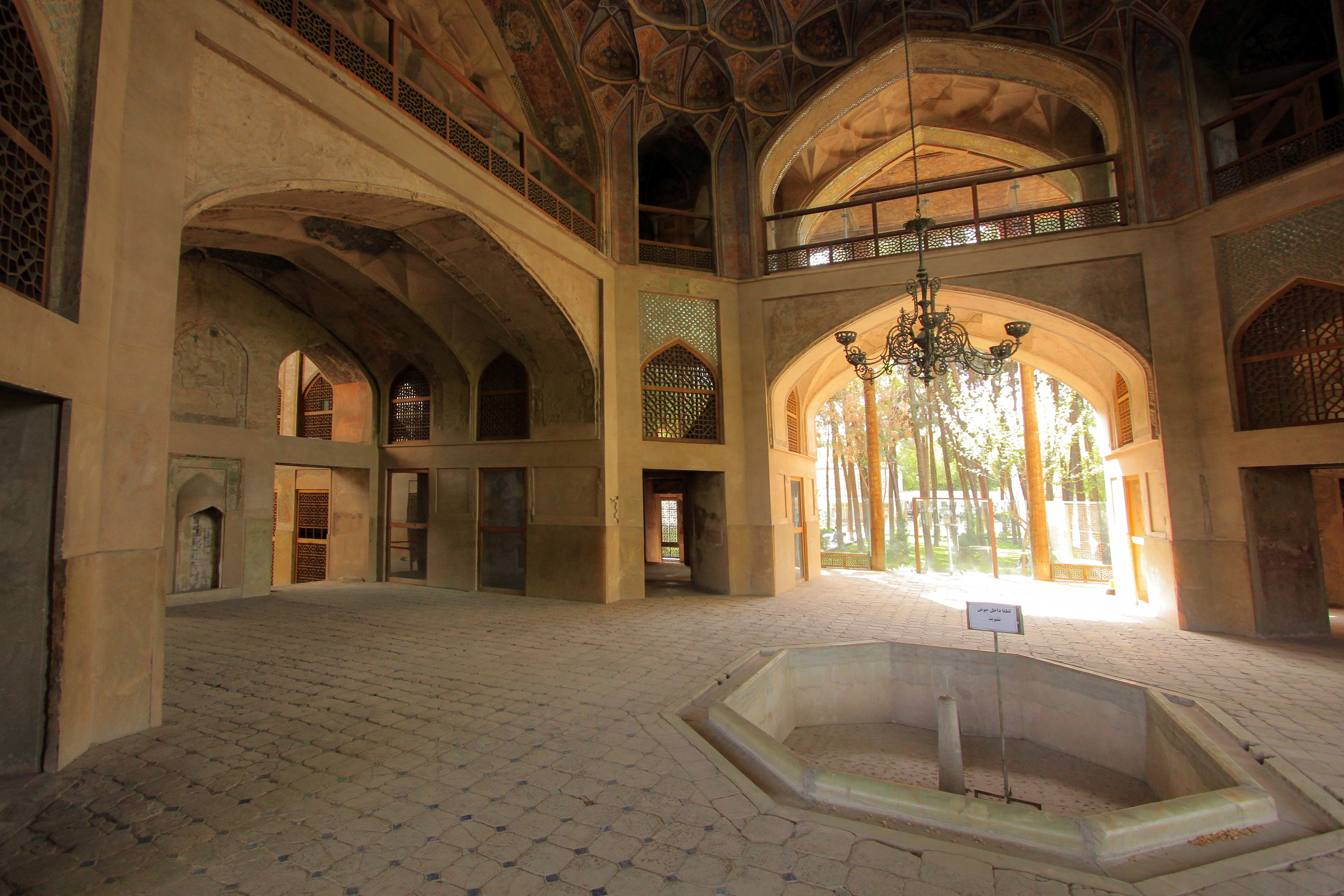
A room inside Hasht Behesht

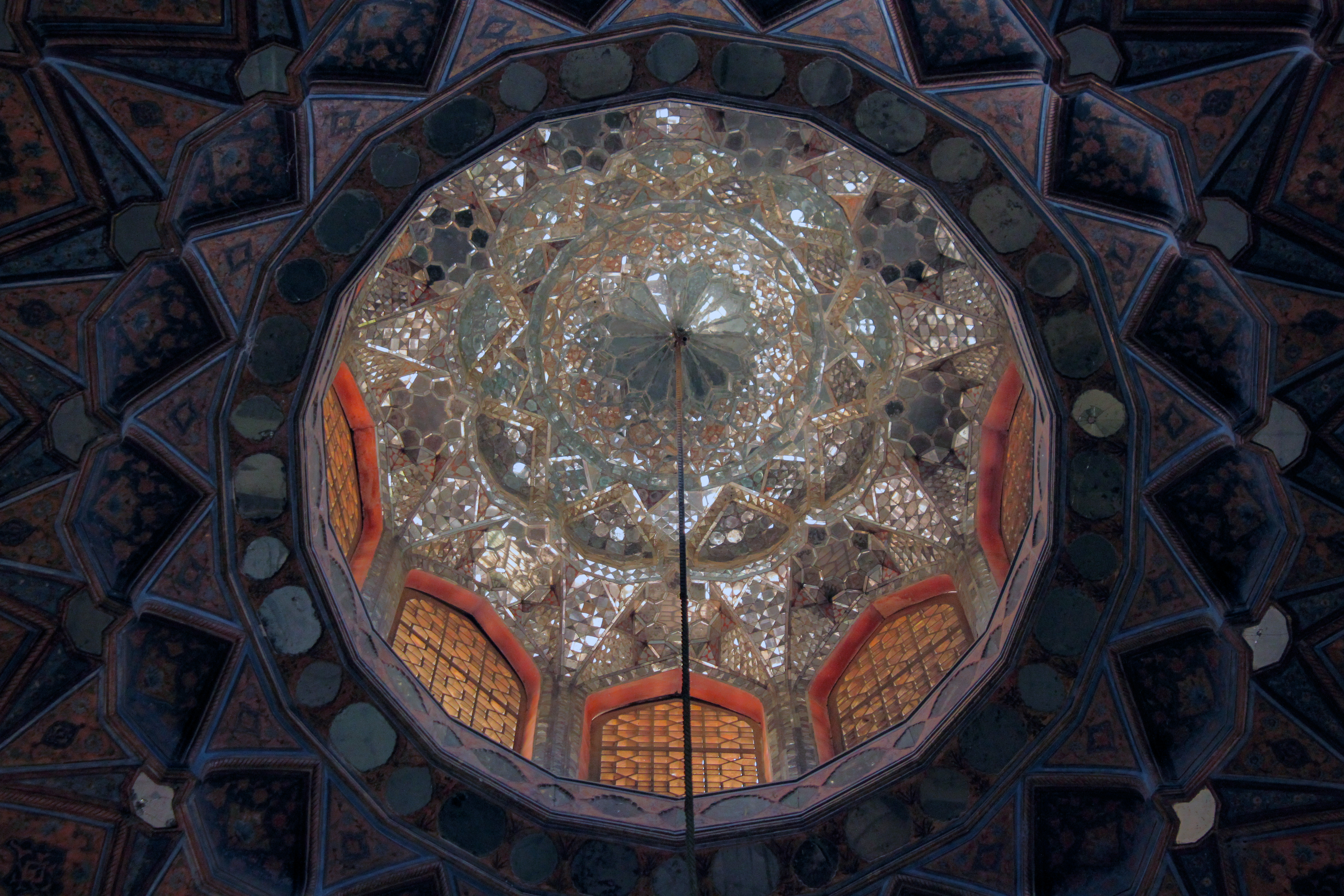
A ceiling in Hasht Behesht featuring ayeneh-kari

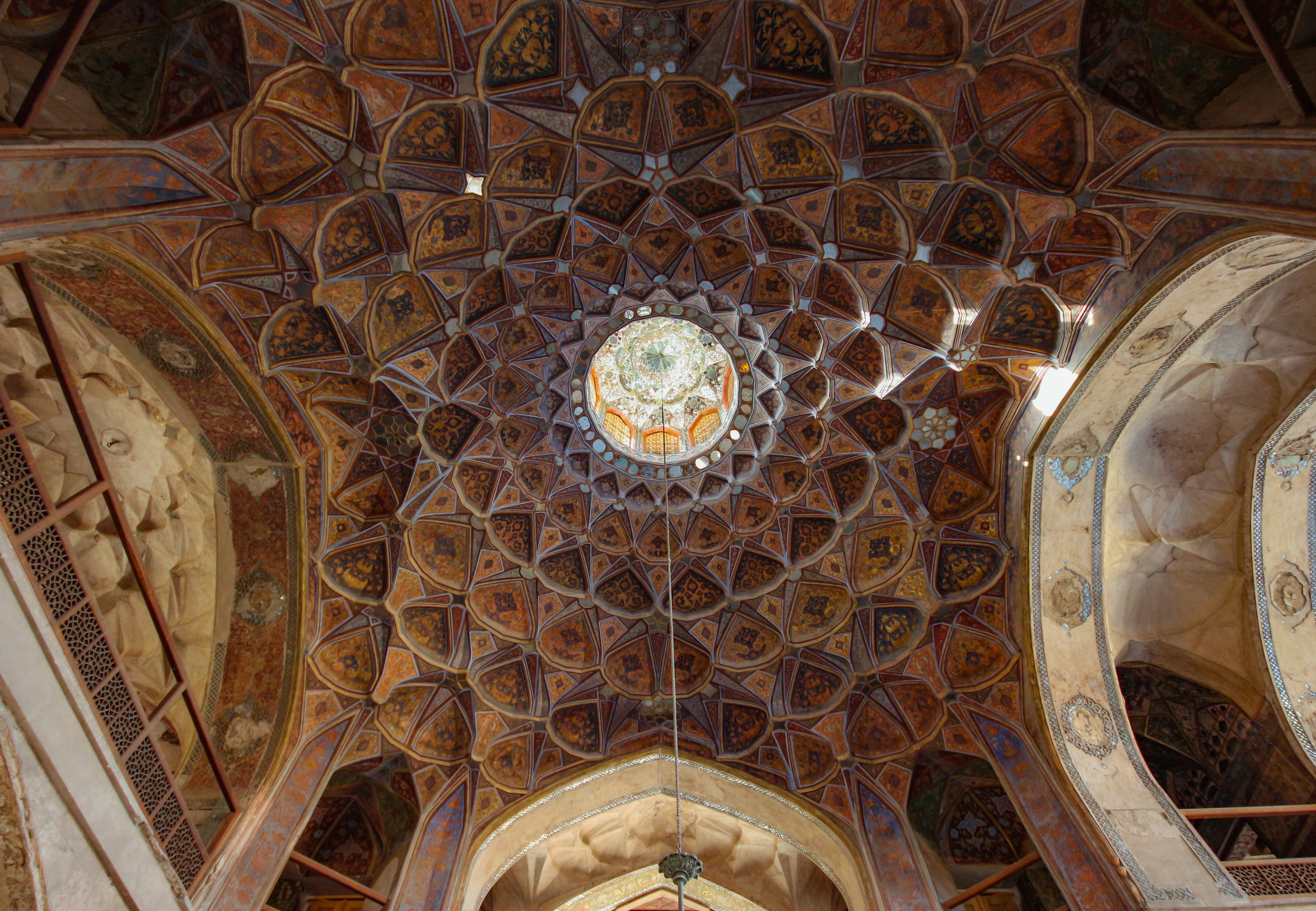
A ceiling in Hasht Behesht

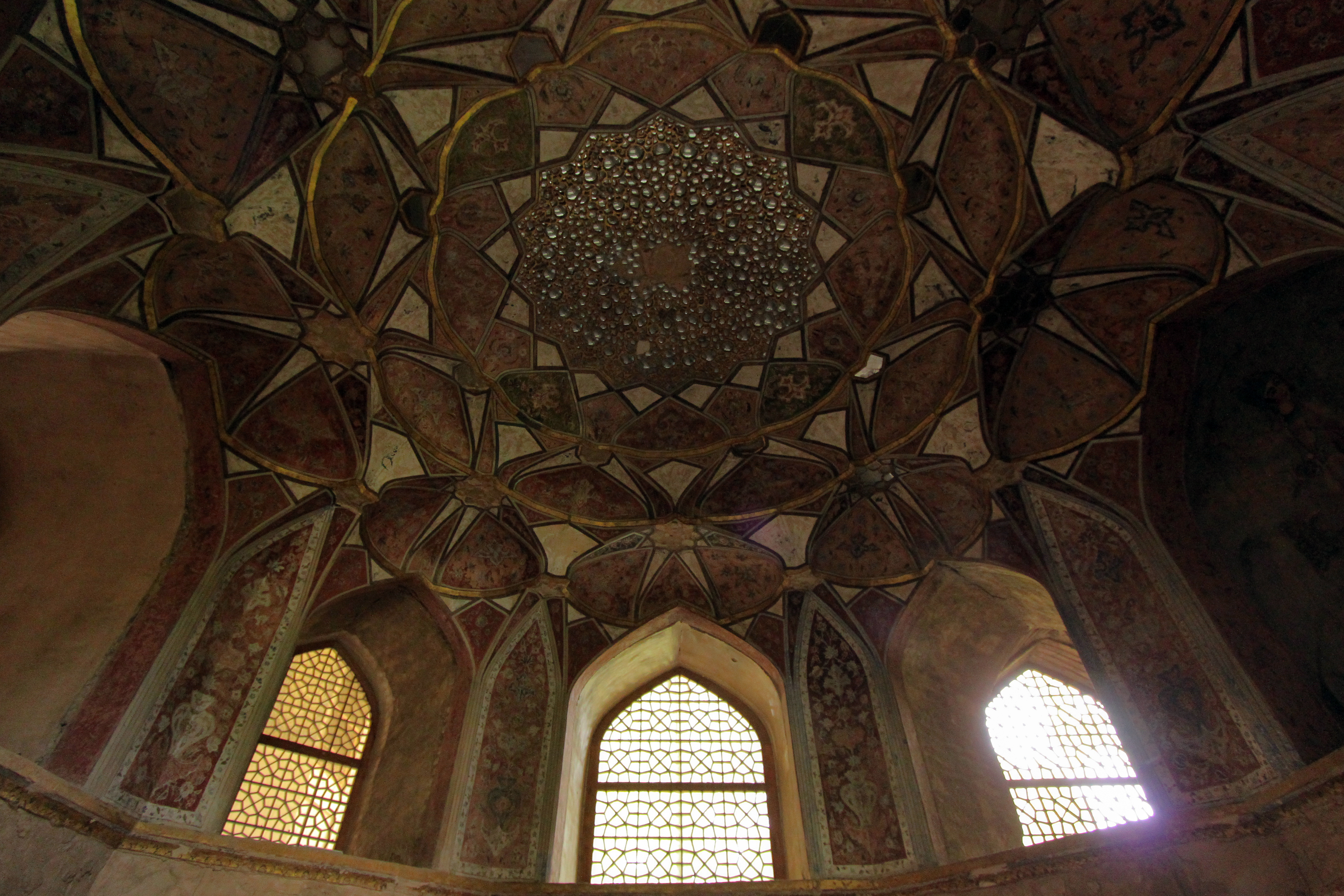
A ceiling in Hasht Behesht

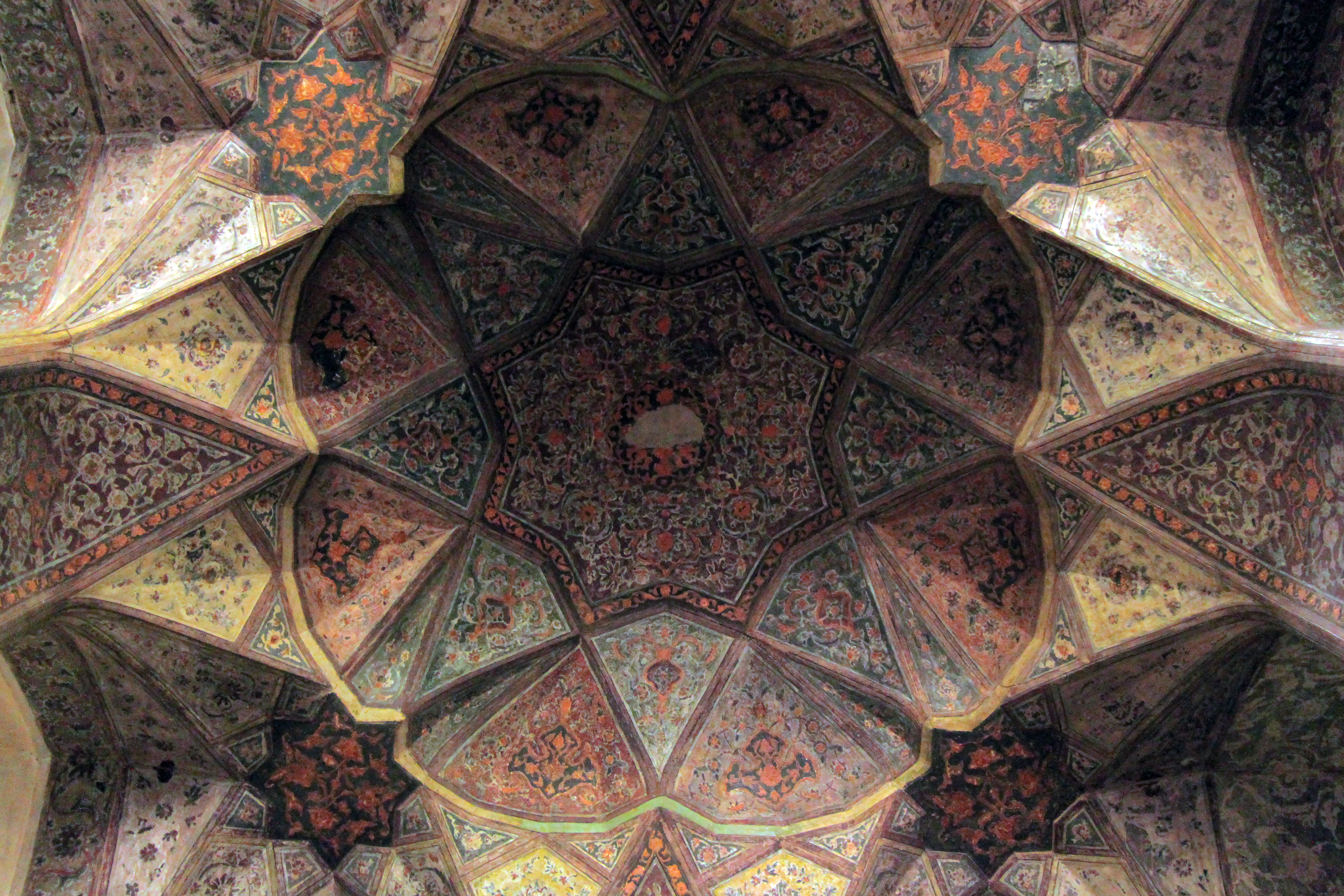
A ceiling in Hasht Behesht

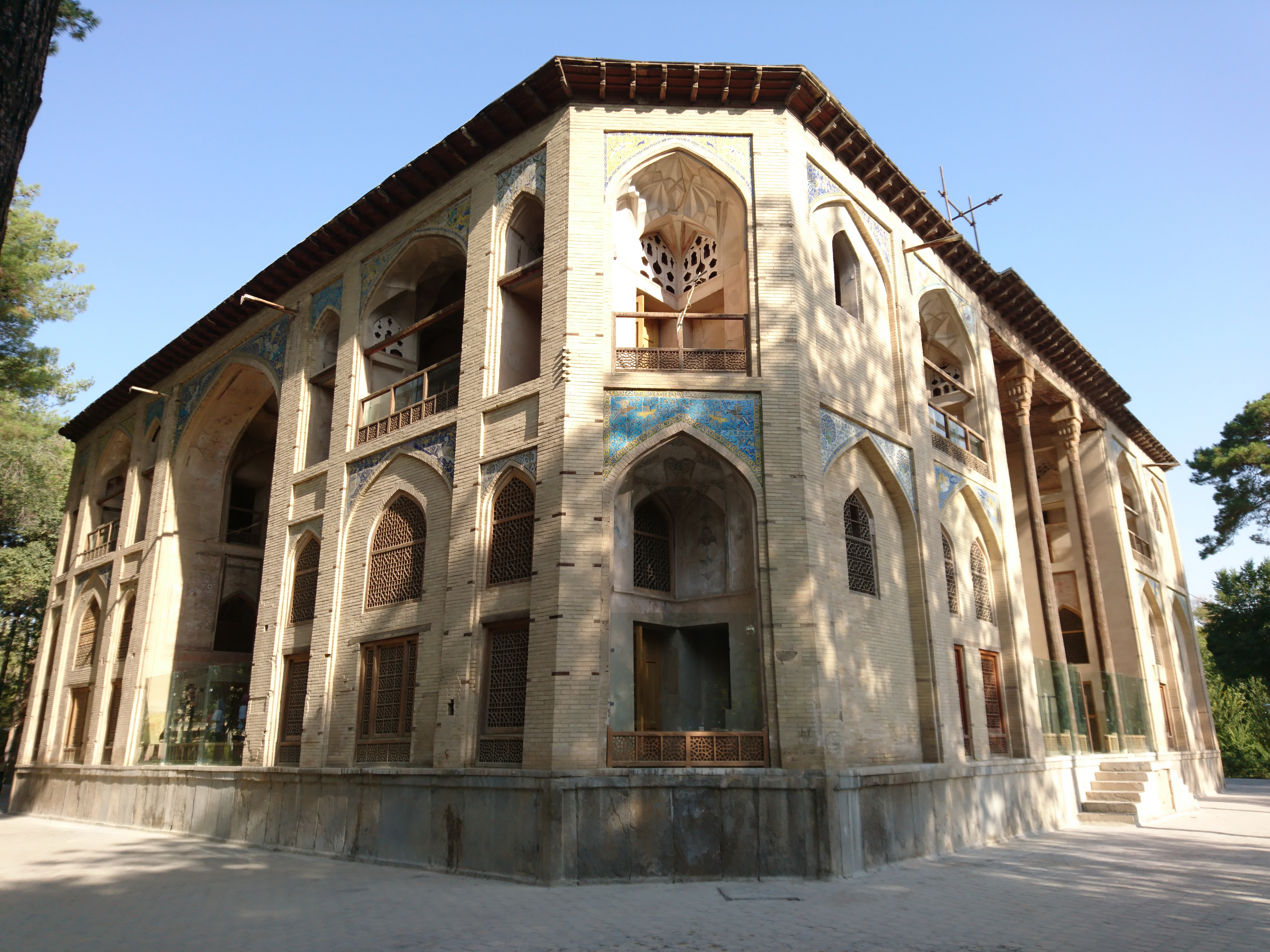
An exterior view of Hasht Behesht

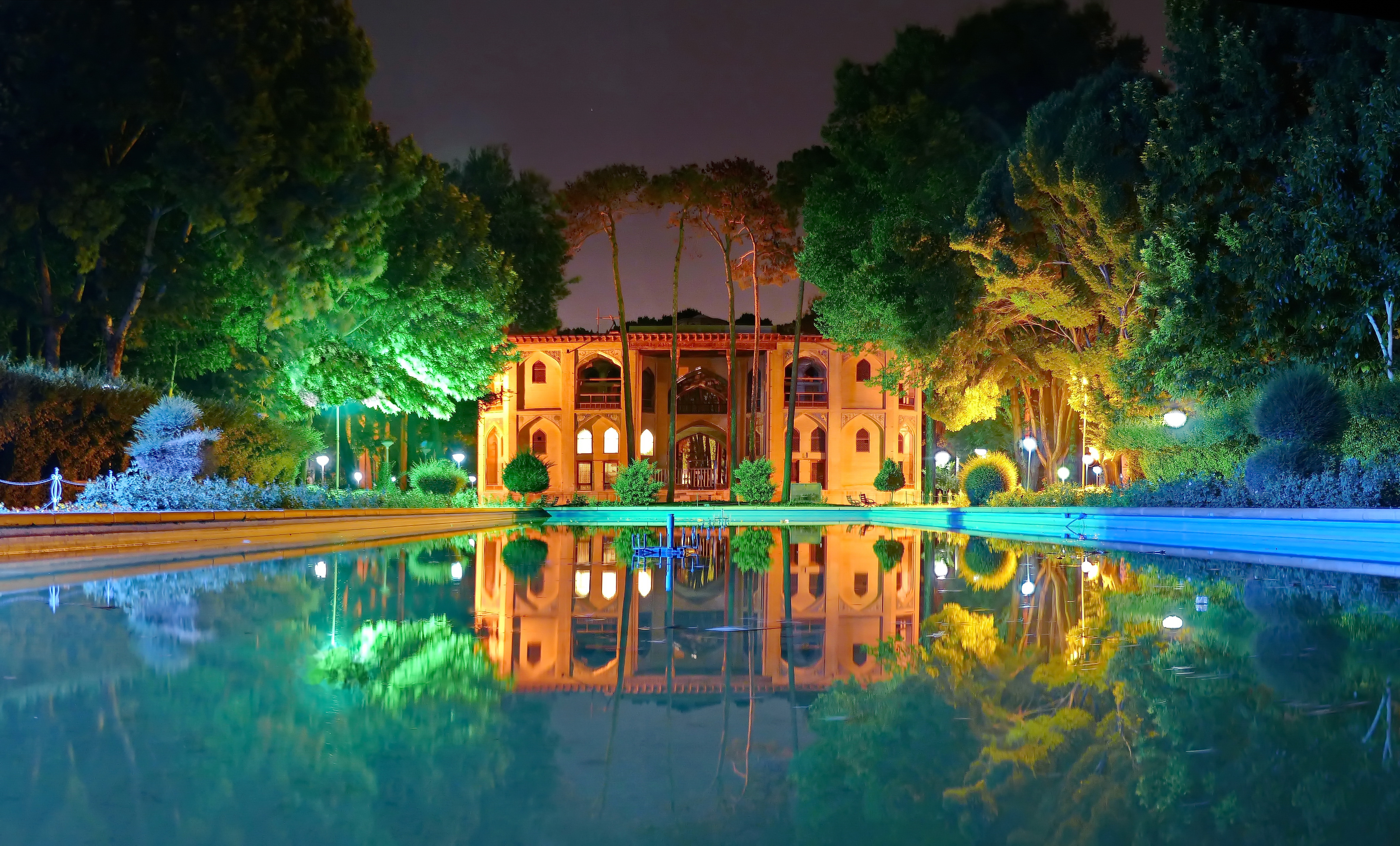
Hasht Behesht at night

== See also ==
- Iranian Art Museum Garden

== Bibliography ==
- Wilber, D. N. (1962). Persian Gardens and Garden Pavilions. Tokyo. pp. 107–11.
- Ferrante, M. (1968). "Le Pavillon de Hašt Bihišt, ou les Huit Paradis, à Ispahan: Relevés et problèmes s'y rattachant'". In Zander, G. (ed.). Travaux de restauration de monuments historiques en Iran. Rome. pp. 399–420.
