= George II of Imereti =

King of Imereti in western Georgia

George II
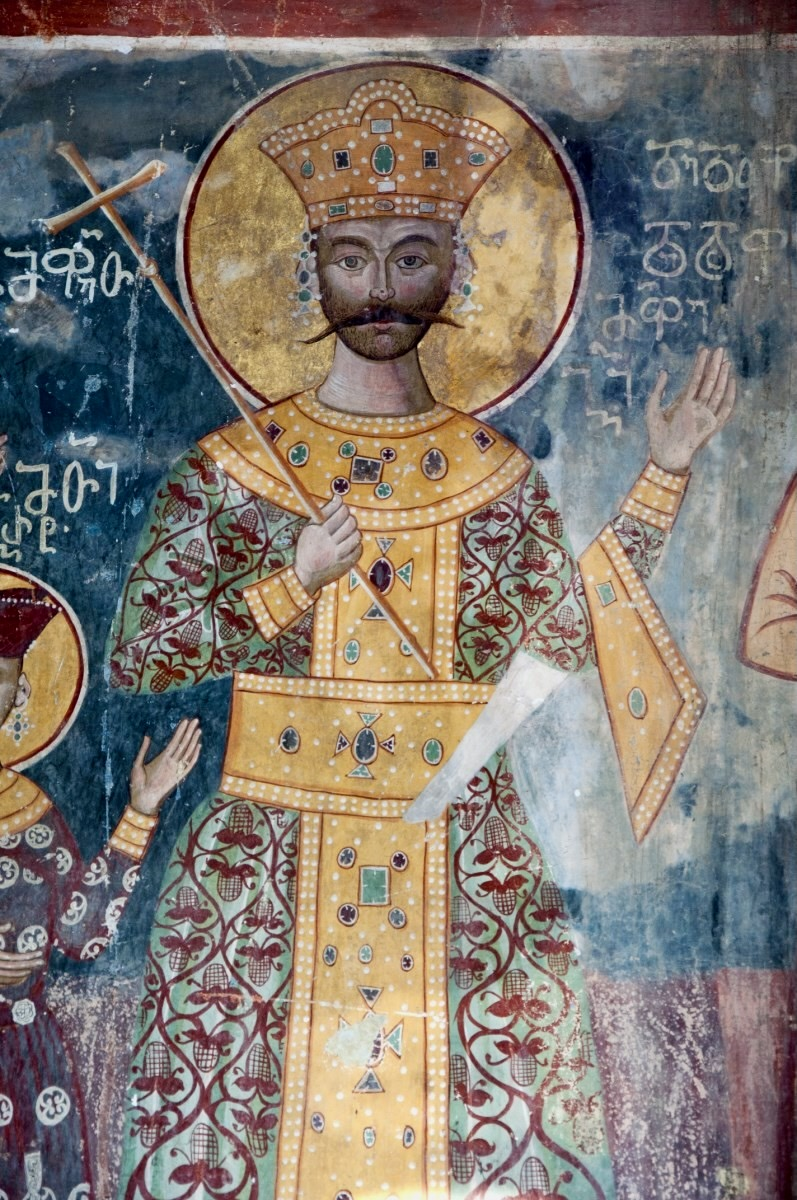
- George II, a fresco from the Gelati Monastery

King of Imereti
- Reign: 1565–1585
- Predecessor: Bagrat III
- Successor: Levan
- Died: 1585
- Spouse: Anonymous wife (died 1561) Rusudan Sharvashidze (m. 1563; died 1578) Tamar Diasamidze (died 1586)
- Issue Among others: Prince Alexander; Prince Bagrat; Levan of Imereti
- Dynasty: Bagrationi
- Father: Bagrat III of Imereti
- Mother: Helen
- Religion: Georgian Orthodox Church (Catholicate of Abkhazia)
- Khelrtva

George II (Georgian: გიორგი II, romanized: giorgi II; died 1585) was a Georgian monarch of the Bagrationi dynasty, who reigned as king (mepe) of Imereti, one of the principal realms of western Georgia, from 1565 to 1585. During his reign, George II had to face conflicts with neighboring principalities, as well as the ascendant Ottoman Empire.

At one point, King George was able to forge an alliance with his fellow Georgian monarchs George II of Guria and George III of Mingrelia. This so called "alliance of three Georges" provided a much needed period of peace for Western Georgia in the 1570s.

== Reign ==
George II was born to King Bagrat III and his wife Queen Helen. Modern historians accept 1565 as the year of George II's ascension to the throne.

At the beginning of George's reign, a fragile peace existed between the king and his vassals George II Gurieli, Prince of Guria and Levan I Dadiani, Prince of Mingrelia, who were de facto independent. This peace was quickly undermined when George Gurieli and Levan Dadiani went to war, a conflict soon eased by Gurieli’s marriage to Dadiani’s daughter in 1566.

When Gurieli later divorced his wife, the princes of western Georgia prepared for civil war: George Gurieli allied himself with George II of Imereti, while Levan Dadiani formed an anti-royal coalition with the Chiladze and Lipartiani families, aiming to depose King George and place on the throne Prince Khosro, the monarch’s cousin. Dadiani’s forces invaded Guria, but King George inflicted a decisive defeat on them in 1568 at the Battle of Ianeti.

=== Feudal conflict intensifies ===
The victory at Ianeti was followed by an Imeretian–Gurian invasion of Mingrelia, and when King George captured Zugdidi, Levan Dadiani was forced to take refuge in Constantinople. However, George II of Imereti continued to face a defiant nobility. Encouraged by Sultan Selim II, Lavan Dadiani returned to Georgia in 1568 and, supported by nine Ottoman ships and troops from Erzurum and Trabzon, landed in Guria, threatening Prince Gurieli with a devastating invasion. George Gurieli was forced to pay him tribute and assisted in expelling the Georgia's forces from Mingrelia.

King George sought to consolidate his power by orchestrating the assassination of Duke Javakh Chiladze during a banquet held in his honor. The Chiladze domains, a powerful territory spanning Imereti, Guria, and Mingrelia, were then annexed to the royal lands as punishment for the duke’s support of Dadiani during the Battle of Ianeti. In response, George of Guria and Levan of Mingrelia declared war on George II, defeating him and divided the Chiladze estates between themselves.

These conflicts had severe consequences for the local population. The economy of western Georgia, laboriously established by Bagrat III, collapsed, while the Ottomans exploited the instability to extend their influence over the regional nobility.

To stabilize the situation, George II of Imereti engaged in a variety of diplomatic maneuvers and facilitated inter-dynastic marriages, which paved the way to an alliance between himself and his neighbors George II of Guria and George III of Mingrelia. This so called "alliance of three Georges" provided a period of peace for Western Georgia for much of the 1570s.

=== Success against the Ottoman invasions ===
In 1578, following the devastation of Tbilisi, the Ottoman general Lala Mustafa Pasha turned his ambitions toward Imereti with the intention of invading the kingdom and overthrowing the “rebel Christian” George. However, George fortified the perilous Likhi Range, the natural frontier between western and eastern Georgia, and inflicted a serious defeat on the Ottoman forces.

George II returned in triumph to Kutaisi, bringing with him treasures seized from the Ottomans. On 1 November, however, Lala Mustafa Pasha once again advanced toward Imereti. George II defeated him for the second time at the Likhi Range, effectively ending Ottoman attempts to conquer western Georgia by force.

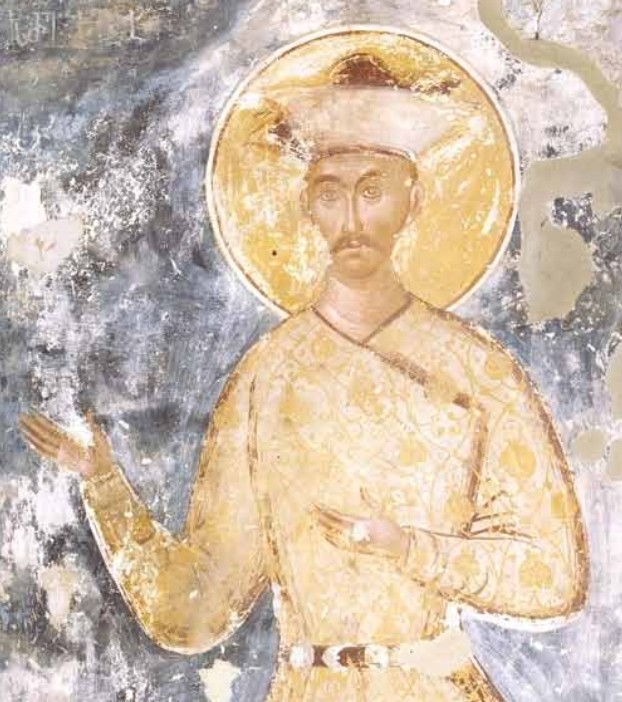
Prince Constantine, brother of George II.

=== Final years ===
In 1582, the fragile peace among the three Georges of western Georgia collapsed following the death of George III Dadiani, who was succeeded by his brother Mamia. Seeking revenge for being previously sidelined by the Georges, Mamia invaded Guria and forced George II of Guria into exile.

In 1583, the aging and weakened George II sought to secure the throne of Imereti for his son, Levan—his third designated heir following the deaths of his two elder sons—who was then only ten years old. Fearing the ambitions of his brother Constantine, George II had both Constantine and his nephew Rostom imprisoned.

George II died in 1585 after a reign of at least twenty years. He was succeeded by the young Levan, who was vulnerable to the powerful nobility and witnessed the royal authority disintegrate under the influence of Mamia Dadiani. The disorder following George II’s succession resulted in internal turmoil and the rise of Mingrelian power, culminating in the Battle of Gochouri. Simon of Kartli also exploited the instability, launching three invasions of Imereti in the years following the death of George II.

== Family ==
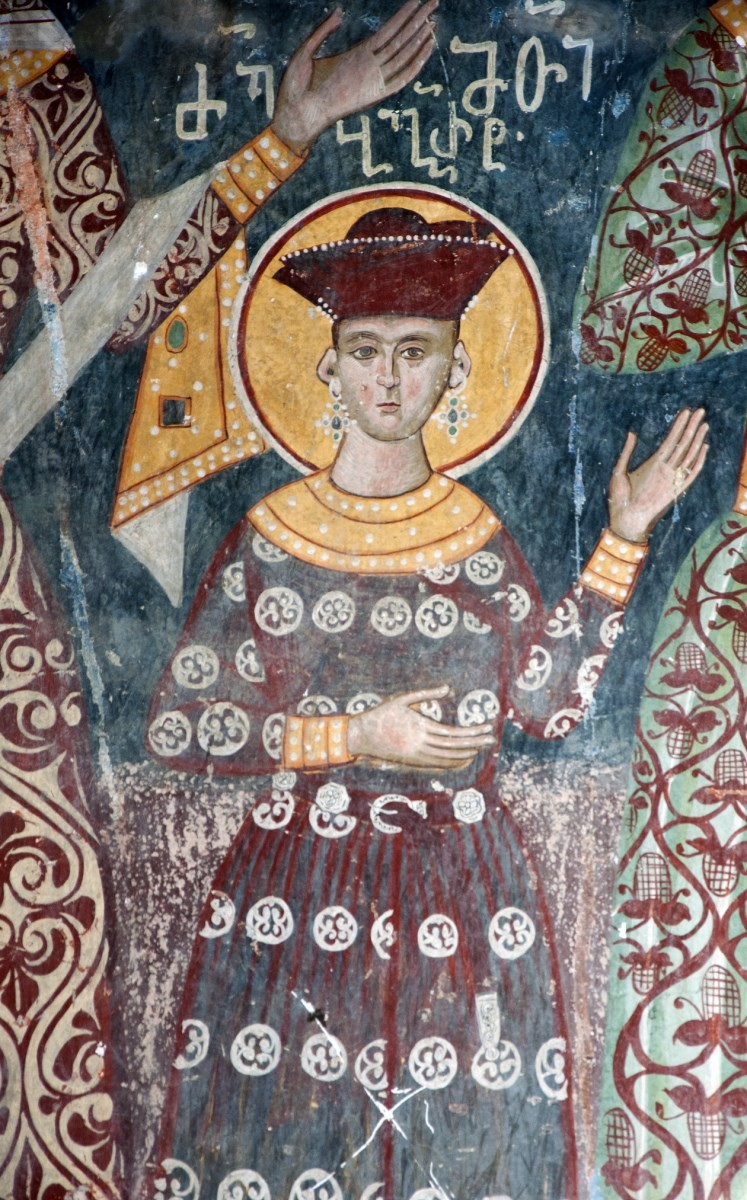
Prince Bagrat, son of George II, from the Gelati Monastery.

George was married three times. The identity of his first wife is unknown; she died in 1561. They had one son:

- Prince Alexander (died 1558).

In 1563, George married his second wife Rusudan Sharvashidze, who died on 4 August 1578. This marriage produced two sons:

- Prince Bagrat (1565 – 22 May 1578), who married a daughter of Levan I Dadiani, Prince of Mingrelia;
- Levan of Imereti (1573–1590), King of Imereti (r. 1585–1590).

George married thirdly Princess Tamar (died 1586), daughter of Shermazan Diasamidze. They had three sons:

- Prince Alexander (fl. 1584);
- Prince Rostom (fl. 1584);
- Prince Mamia (fl. 1584).

== Bibliography ==
- Asatiani, Nodar (2007). საქართველოს ისტორია [History of Georgia] (in Georgian). Vol. II. Tbilisi: Tbilisi University Press. ISBN 9789941130045.
- Asatiani, Nodar; Janelidze, Otar (2009). History of Georgia. Tbilisi: Publishing House Petite. ISBN 978-9941-9063-6-7.
- Brosset, Marie-Félicité (1856). Histoire de la Géorgie depuis l'Antiquité jusqu'au XIXe siècle. St. Petersburg: Imprimerie de l'Académie impériale des sciences. (ISBN 978-0543944801)
- Rayfield, Donald (2012). Edge of Empires, a History of Georgia. London: Reaktion Books. ISBN 9781780230702.
- Tsotskolaouri, Avtandil (2017). საქართველოს ისტორია [History of Georgia] (in Georgian). Tbilisi: SAUNJE Publishing House. ISBN 978-9941-451-79-9.
- W.E.D. Allen, A History of the Georgian People, London, Routledge & Kegan Paul, 1932
- (in Russian) Вахушти Багратиони (Vakhushti Bagrationi) (1745). История Царства Грузинского: Жизнь Имерети.

Preceded by Bagrat III	King of Imereti; 1565–1585	Succeeded by Levan
