= Prince Bagrat of Imereti (1565–1578) =

Georgian royal prince (1565–1578)

Bagrat
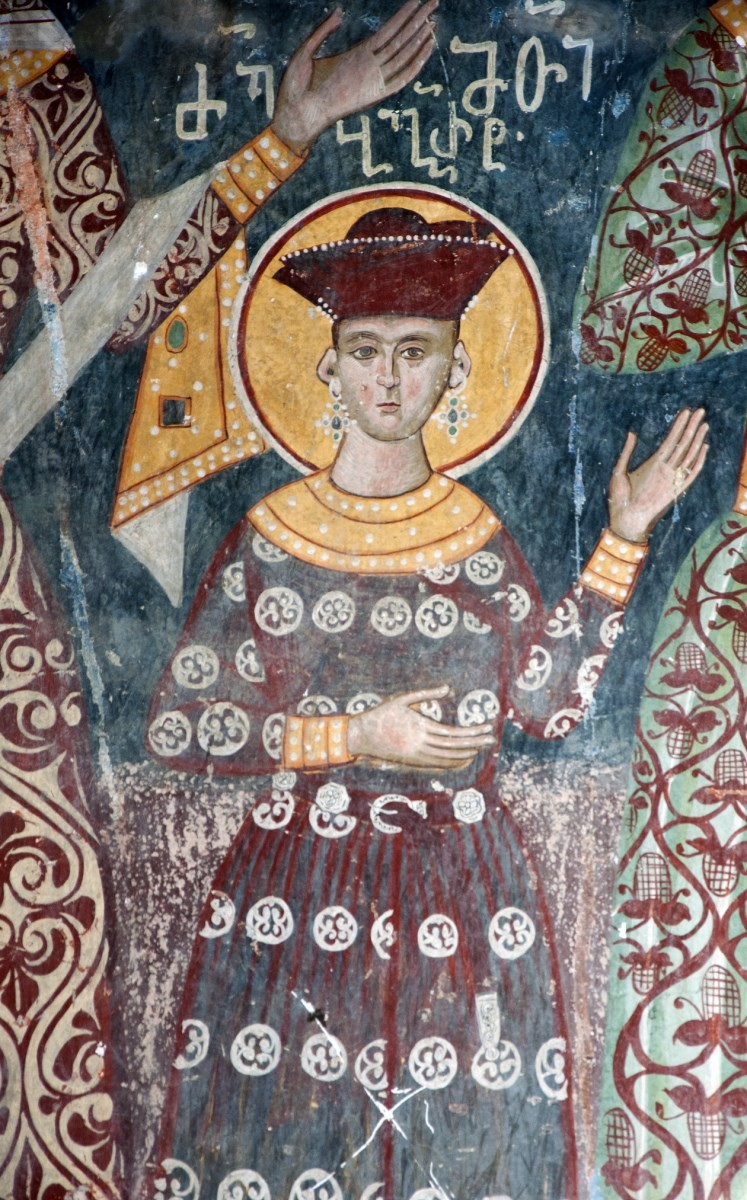
- Prince Bagrat, fresco from Gelati Monastery.
- Born: 1565
- Died: 22 May 1578 (aged 12–13)
- Spouse: Daughter of Levan I Dadiani (m. 1573)
- Dynasty: Bagrationi
- Father: George II of Imereti
- Mother: Rusudan Sharvashidze
- Religion: Georgian Orthodox Church (Catholicate of Abkhazia)

Bagrat (Georgian: ბაგრატი; 1565 – 22 May 1578) was a Georgian royal prince (batonishvili) of the Bagrationi dynasty and the heir apparent to the Kingdom of Imereti.

== Biography ==
Bagrat was born in 1565 to King George II of Imereti and his second wife, Queen Rusudan Sharvashidze, whom the king had married in 1563. Because George II's eldest son and heir from his first marriage, Prince Alexander, had died in 1558, Bagrat became the heir apparent to the Imeretian crown.

To strengthen ties between Imereti and the Principality of Mingrelia, King George II arranged in 1573 for Bagrat to marry an unnamed sister of the reigning Prince George III Dadiani and daughter of the late Levan I Dadiani.

Bagrat died young on May 22, 1578. His mother, Queen Rusudan, died just a few months later on August 4, 1578. Following Bagrat's death, his younger brother Levan became the new heir apparent.

== Bibliography ==
- Rekhviashvili, Mikheil (1989). K. Chkhataraishvili (ed.). იმერეთის სამეფო (1462–1810 წ.წ.) [The Kingdom of Imereti (1462–1810)] (in Georgian). Tbilisi: Tbilisi University Press.
- Soselia, Olgha (1990). ნარკვევები ფეოდალური ხანის დასავლეთ საქართველოს სოციალურ-პოლიტიკური ისტორიიდან. წიგნი III: სათავადოები (in Georgian). Tbilisi: Metsniereba. ISBN 5-520-00728-4.
- Brosset, Marie-Félicité (1856). Histoire de la Georgie depuis l'antiquite jusqu'au 19. siecle (in French). Vol. 5. l'acad. Imper. des sciences.
- Toumanoff, Cyril (1976). Manuel de Généalogie et de Chronologie pour l'histoire de la Caucasie chrétienne (Arménie, Géorgie, Albanie) [Manual of Genealogy and Chronology of Christian Caucasian History (Armenia, Georgia, Albania)] (in French). Rome: Edizioni Aquila.
