= Gelati =

Gelati may refer to:

- Gelati Monastery, a medieval monastery in Georgia
- Plural of gelato, an Italian ice cream
