= Prince Constantine of Imereti (died 1587) =

Prince Constantine
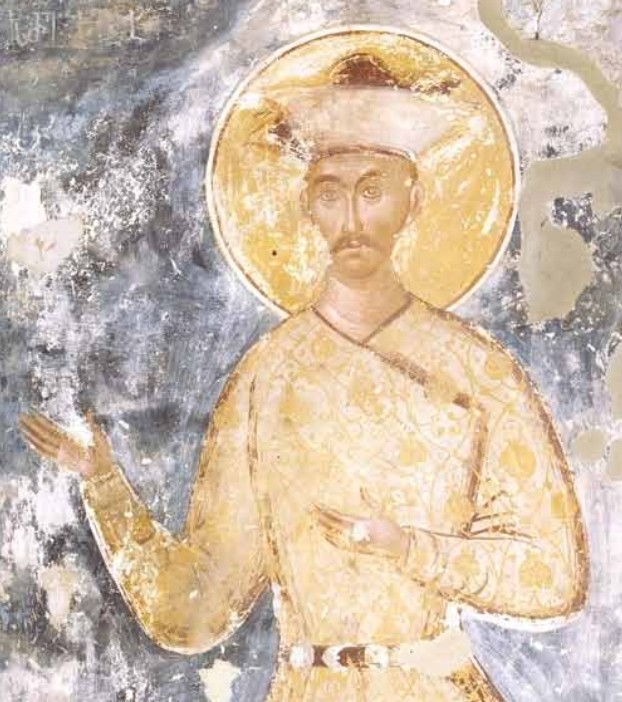
- Prince Constantine, fresco from Gelati Monastery.
- Died: 1587
- Spouse: Helen Gurieli
- Issue: Rostom of Imereti; George III of Imereti; Prince Simon
- Dynasty: Bagrationi
- Father: Bagrat III of Imereti
- Mother: Helen
- Religion: Georgian Orthodox Church (Catholicate of Abkhazia)

Constantine (Georgian: კონსტანტინე, romanized: k'onst'ant'ine; died in 1587) was a Georgian royal prince (batonishvili) of the Bagrationi dynasty of Imereti.

== Biography ==
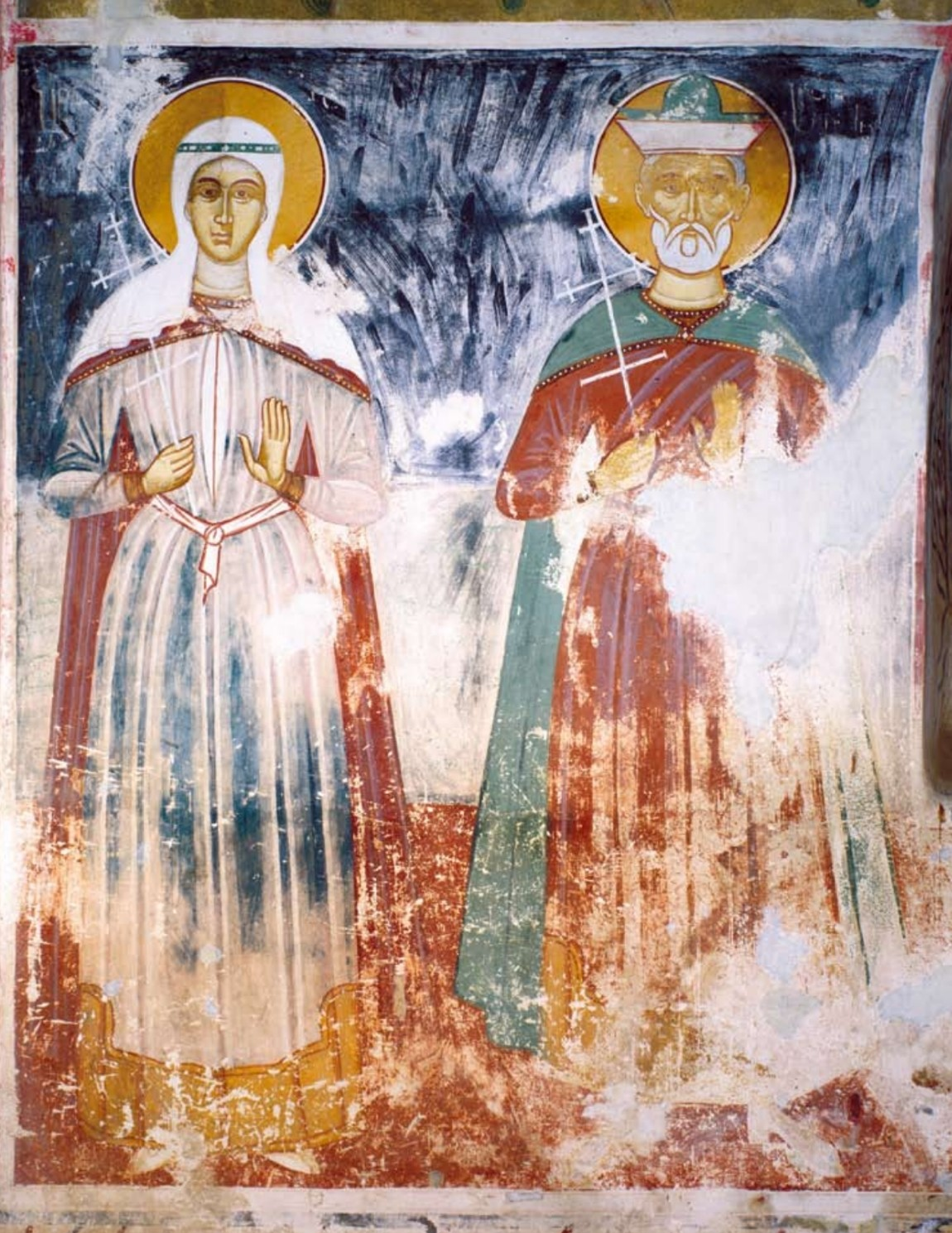
Fresco in Gelati Monastery depicting Prince Constantine and his wife, Helen.

Constantine was a son of King Bagrat III of Imereti and brother of King George II of Imereti. He was opposed to his brother, George, who had him and his son Rostom cast in prison in 1583. After the death of George in 1585, Constantine attempted to disinherit George's young heir, Levan and seized the territory east of the Rioni River, including Skanda, Katskhi, and Argueti. Levan was able to reclaim these areas in 1587, but he had to buy peace by granting to his uncle a princely estate in Argueti.

== Family ==
Constantine was married to Helen (fl. 1571–1605), daughter of Rostom Gurieli, Prince of Guria. His children were:

- Rostom of Imereti (1561–1605), King of Imereti (r. 1590–1605);
- George III of Imereti (died 1639), King of Imereti (r. 1605–1639);
- Prince Simon (fl. 1603).
