= George III of Imereti =

King of Imereti from 1605 to 1639

George III
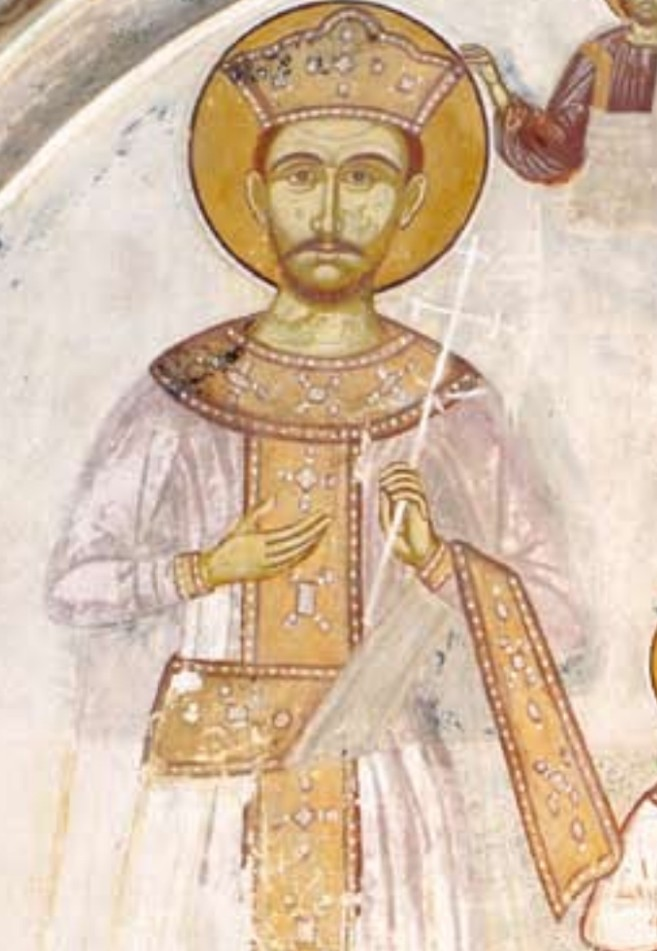
- George III, fresco from Gelati Monastery.

King of Imereti
- Reign: 1605–1639
- Predecessor: Rostom
- Successor: Alexander III
- Died: 1639
- Spouse: Tamar
- Issue: Alexander III of Imereti; Prince Rostom; Prince Mamuka; Prince Beri; Princess Khvaramze
- Dynasty: Bagrationi
- Father: Prince Constantine of Imereti
- Religion: Georgian Orthodox Church (Catholicate of Abkhazia)
- Khelrtva

George III (Georgian: გიორგი III, romanized: giorgi III; died 1639) was a Georgian monarch of the Bagrationi dynasty, who reigned as king (mepe) of Imereti from 1605 to 1639.

== Biography ==
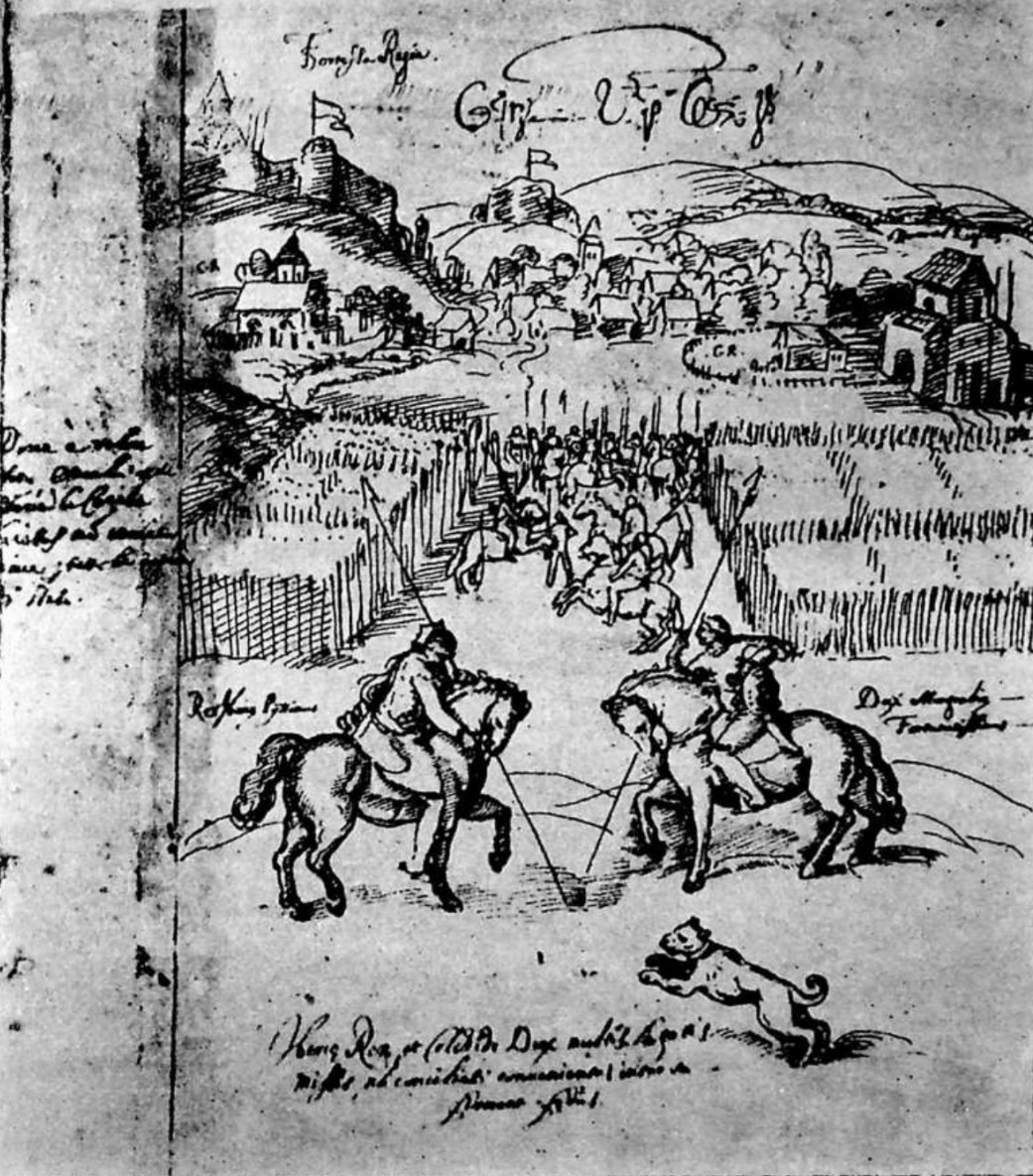
George III and Levan II Dadiani.

George was a natural half-brother of Rostom of Imereti on whose death he succeeded in 1605, but his authority was seriously challenged by the energetic prince of Mingrelia, Levan II Dadiani, whose increasing influence over the western Georgian polities George tried to restrict without any success. In 1623, Levan, with a combined Mingrelian-Abkhazian army, inflicted a heavy defeat upon the royal troops at the Battle of Gochouri. In his quest for allies, George established close ties with the influential eastern Georgian noble Giorgi Saakadze who employed an Imeretian force in his struggle against King Teimuraz I of Kakheti. After Saakadze's defeat in 1626, George made an alliance with Teimuraz and arranged a marriage between his son, Alexander (III), and Teimuraz's daughter Darejan (1629). This, however, failed to bring the feudal anarchy in Imereti to an end and the unrest continued. Later in his reign, George III once again campaigned against Levan Dadiani, but was defeated and taken captive. He was ransomed by his son Alexander, but George did not live long and died in 1639.

== Family ==
George was married to a certain Tamar (fl. 1604–1639). They had four sons and one daughter:

- Alexander III of Imereti (died 1660), King of Imereti (r. 1639–1660);
- Prince Rostom (fl. 1619–1639);
- Prince Mamuka (died 1654), military commander;
- Prince Beri (fl. 1639);
- Princess Khvaramze (fl. 1619–1626), who married Avtandil, son of Giorgi Saakadze.

Preceded by Rostom	King of Imereti; 1605–1639	Succeeded by Alexander III
