= Levan of Imereti =

Levan

King of Imereti
- Reign: 1585—1590
- Predecessor: George II
- Successor: Rostom
- Born: 1573
- Died: 1590 (aged 16–17)
- Spouse: Marekhi Dadiani (m. 1586)
- Dynasty: Bagrationi
- Father: George II of Imereti
- Mother: Rusudan Sharvashidze
- Religion: Georgian Orthodox Church (Catholicate of Abkhazia)
- Khelrtva

Levan (Georgian: ლევანი, romanized: levani; 1573–1590), of the Bagrationi dynasty, was a king (mepe) of Imereti from 1585 to 1590.

== Biography ==
Levan was born in 1573 to George II of Imereti and his second wife, Rusudan Sharvashidze. George's eldest son by his first wife, Alexander, died in 1558, and his second son by Rusudan, Bagrat, died in 1578, leaving the young Levan as George II's only heir. In 1583, George II imprisoned his brother, Constantine, and his nephew, Rostom, to prevent them from challenging Levan's succession, as they threatened to disinherit the young prince after George II's death.

He succeeded on the death of his father in 1585 when he was twelve years old. With his ascend to the throne, Levan faced a revolt by his own uncle, Constantine, who defied the royal authority and took control of Upper Imereti. Levan made an alliance with the Mingrelian Prince Mamia IV Dadiani, married his sister Marekhi, and forced Constantine to surrender in 1587.

A year later, Imereti was invaded by Simon I, the resurgent king of Kartli in eastern Georgia, who sought to reunify all Georgian lands under his crown. Levan was defeated at the Battle of Gopanto and was forced to flee to the highland province of Lechkhumi, but was soon able to resume the throne after Simon had to return to Kartli. However, Levan soon quarreled with his brother-in-law, Prince Mamia IV Dadiani who defeated the king and imprisoned him at Fort Shkheti, Mingrelia, where he died in 1590, aged 17.

== Bibliography ==
- Soselia, O. (1990). ნარკვევები ფეოდალური ხანის დასავლეთ საქართველოს სოციალურ-პოლიტიკური ისტორიიდან. წიგნი III: სათავადოები [Studies on the Socio-Political History of Feudal-Era Western Georgia. Book III: Principalities] (in Georgian). Tbilisi: Metsniereba. ISBN 5-520-00728-4.
- Rayfield, Donald (2012). Edge of Empires: A History of Georgia. London: Reaktion Books. ISBN 978-1780230306.
- Brosset, Marie-Félicité (1856). Histoire de la Georgie depuis l'antiquite jusqu'au 19. siecle (in French). Vol. 5. l'acad. Imper. des sciences.

| Preceded by George II | King of Imereti; 1585–1590 | Succeeded by Rostom |
