= Princess Khvaramze of Imereti =

Khvaramze (Georgian: ხვარამზე; fl. 1619–1626) was an Imeretian royal princess and a daughter of King George III of Imereti (r. 1605–1639). Between 1619 and 1626, she was betrothed to Avtandil, the son of the Grand Mouravi Giorgi Saakadze.
