= Rostom of Imereti =

Rostom
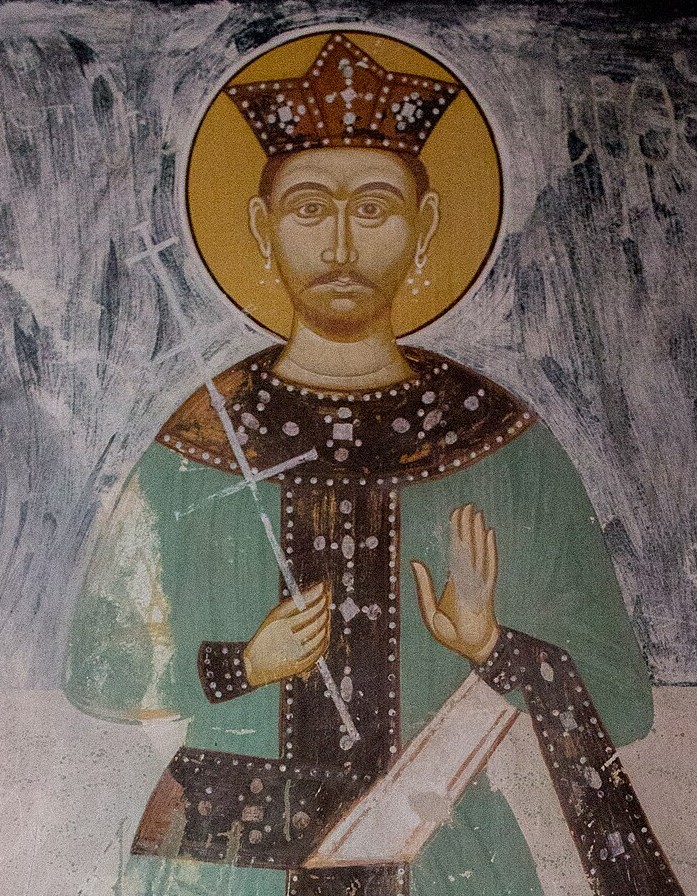
- Fresco of Rostom from the Gelati Monastery.

King of Imereti
- Reign: 1590–1605
- Predecessor: Levan
- Successor: George III
- Born: 1561
- Died: 1605 (aged 43–44)
- Spouse: Tinatin Jaqeli; Nestan-Darejan
- Issue: Prince Alexander
- Dynasty: Bagrationi
- Father: Prince Constantine of Imereti
- Mother: Elene Gurieli
- Religion: Georgian Orthodox Church (Catholicate of Abkhazia)
- Khelrtva

Rostom (Georgian: როსტომი; 1561–1605), of the Bagrationi dynasty, was a king (mepe) of Imereti from 1590 until his death in 1605.

== Biography ==
Rostom was born in 1561 (or 1571), he was the son of Prince Constantine, sometime claimant to the crown of Imereti, and his wife, Elene, daughter of Rostom Gurieli, Prince of Guria. He was raised to the throne through the support of Mamia IV Dadiani, Prince of Mingrelia, who had deposed King Levan of Imereti in 1590. Rostom's authority was defied, however, by his ostensible vassal George II Gurieli, prince of Guria, who employed an Ottoman force to dethrone the king in favor of Rostom's relative Bagrat IV.

Rostom fled to Mingrelia, from where he continued struggle for the crown. The eastern Georgian king Simon I of Kartli exploited the situation and brought most of Imereti under his control. Rostom fled to Mingrelia, with Manuchar I Dadiani, who rejected Simon's ultimatum and moved into Imereti. He defeated Simon at Opshkviti and ousted him from Imereti in 1590.

Rostom was reinstated as king of Imereti and made peace with Simon. His authority was largely nominal though, and the power was effectively held by a Georgian aristocratic élite, most notably by the Prince of Mingrelia. Rostom died in 1605 and was succeeded by his half-brother George III.

== Family ==
Rostom was first married to Tinatin (died 1610), daughter of Manuchar II Jaqeli, Atabeg of Samtskhe, with whom he had a son, Alexander (fl. 1590–1604). He married secondly a certain Nestan-Darejan (fl. 1590–1604). (Note: According to Prince Vakhushti of Kartli, Rostom was married only to Tinatin Jaqeli. He states that their marriage took place in 1597 and that it was childless.)

== Bibliography ==
- Toumanoff, Cyril (1976). Manuel de Généalogie et de Chronologie pour l'histoire de la Caucasie chrétienne (Arménie, Géorgie, Albanie) [Manual of Genealogy and Chronology of Christian Caucasian History (Armenia, Georgia, Albania)] (in French). Rome: Edizioni Aquila.
- Brosset, Marie-Félicité (1856). Histoire de la Georgie depuis l'antiquite jusqu'au 19. siecle (in French). Vol. 5. l'acad. Imper. des sciences.

Preceded by Levan	King of Imereti; 1590–1605	Succeeded by George III
