= Battle of Gochouri =

Battle between the Principality of Mingrelia and Kingdom of Imereti in 1623

- Part of the Western Georgian civil war (1623-1658)
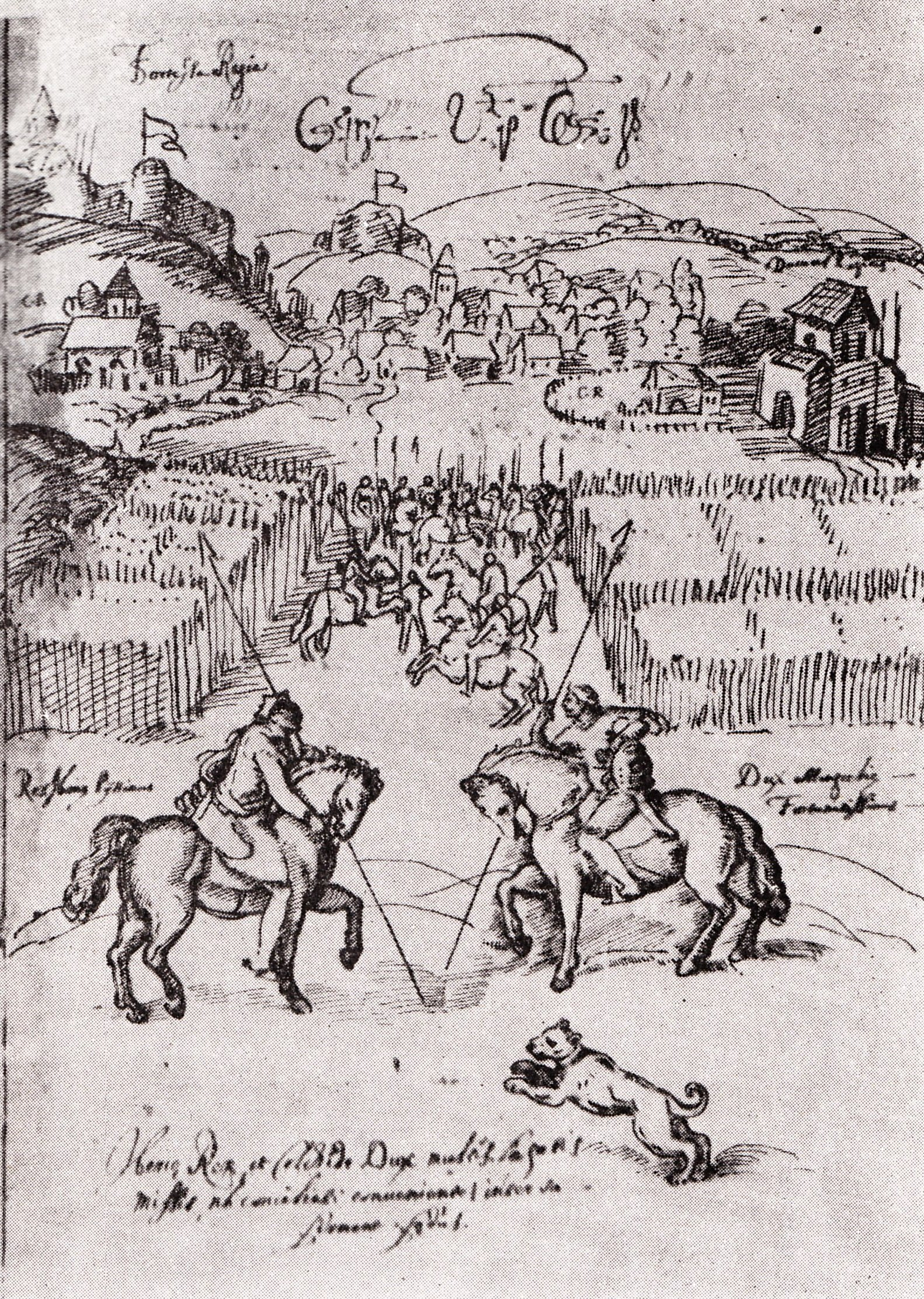
- Levan II Dadiani and George III of Imereti
Date	December 9, 1623
Location	Gochouri, near Kutaisi
Result	Mingrelian victory

Belligerents
Principality of Mingrelia	Kingdom of Imereti

Commanders and leaders
Levan II Dadiani	George III

Strength
Large	Unknown

The Battle of Gochouri was fought on December 9, 1623 between the armies of the Mingrelian Prince Levan II Dadiani and the Imeretian King George III, near Gochouri.

== Battle ==
Levan II Dadiani raised a large army in a few months and managed to assemble troops from Guria, Mingrelia and Abkhazia, but also from the mountainous region of Svaneti and the distant Muslim province of Jiketi, by the Black Sea. The princes, who controlled the entire maritime coast, imposed an economic blockade on Imereti, leading to a famine which affected Kutaisi, the royal capital. Meanwhile, the high noble Paata Tsulukidze, a close ally of King George III, betrayed his overlord and joined Mingrelia, where he became the vizier of Levan II.

To put an end to this rebellion, King George III in turn gathered his troops and launched an offensive against Levan in winter 1623. On December 9, the troops clashed near the village of Gochouri, where the royal forces were defeated. Following his defeat, George III returned to his capital, while many Imeretians soldiers were taken hostage by the rebels until a ransom was paid by the king. While a common practice amongst the Mongols and Seljuks, Levan was the first in the Caucausus to extensively take hostages for ransom, making raiding a profitable venture and reintroducing it on Georgian battlefields as a lucrative practice, a practice that would be used during the 17th century.

== Aftermath ==
Shortly after the victory of Mingrelia, Levan II Dadiani continued his military expansion by confronting his western allies, the Abkhazians. He accused his wife, Tamunia Sharvashidze, of adultery with his vizier Paata Tsulukidze and had her nose and ears cut off, before sending Tsolukidze under the supervision of the Prince of Guria. With his army, Dadiani escorted Tamunia into Abkhazia and devastated the territories of his father-in-law, while imprisoning his two sons.

== Bibliography ==
- Asatiani, Nodar (2008). Საქართველოს ისტორია II [History of Georgia, Volume 2] (in Georgian). Tbilisi: Tbilisi University Press. ISBN 978-9941-13-004-5.
- Rayfield, Donald (2012). Edge of Empires, a History of Georgia. London: Reaktion Books. ISBN 978-1-78023-070-2.
- Suny, Ronald Grigor (1994). The Making of a Georgian Nation (2nd ed.). Indianapolis: Indiana University Press.
