= Gelati Monastery =

Georgian Orthodox monastery near Kutaisi, Georgia

- გელათის მონასტერი
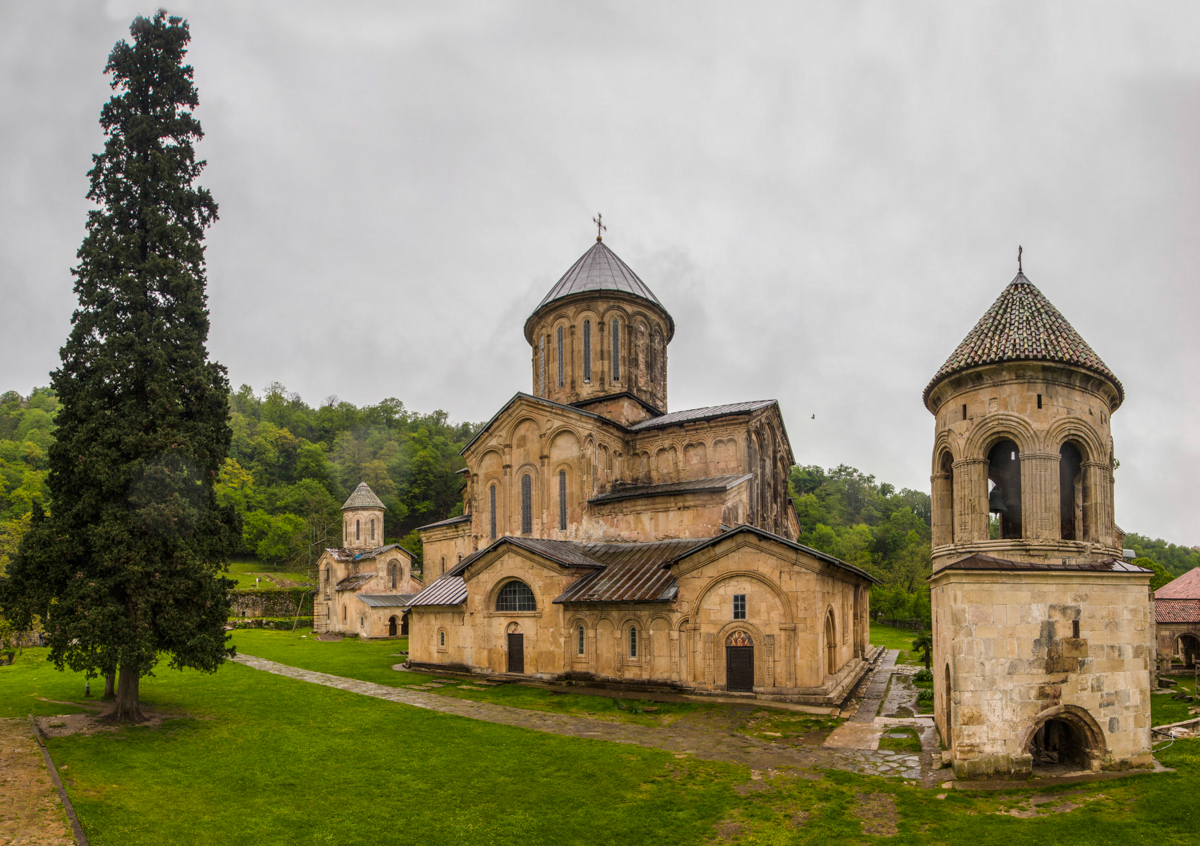
- The monastic complex of Gelati

- Location within Imereti Location within Georgia

Religion
- Affiliation: Georgian Orthodox Church

Location
- Location: Kutaisi, Imereti, Georgia
- Coordinates: 42°17′41″N 42°46′05″E

Architecture
- Type: Monastery
- Style: Georgian
- Founder: David IV of Georgia ("David the Builder")
- Completed: Church of the Virgin, 1106; Churches of St. George and St. Nicholas, 13th century
- UNESCO World Heritage Site
- Official name: Gelati Monastery
- Type: Cultural
- Criteria: iv
- Designated: 1994 (18th session)
- Reference no.: 710
- Region: Europe and North America
- Immovable Cultural Monument of National Significance of Georgia
- Official name: Gelati Monastery
- Designated: November 7, 2006; 19 years ago
- Reference no.: 875
- Item Number in Cultural Heritage Portal: 8550
- Date of entry in the registry: October 3, 2007; 18 years ago

Gelati (Georgian: გელათის მონასტერი [g̊e̞ɫät̪ʰi]) is a medieval monastic complex near Kutaisi in the Imereti region of western Georgia. One of the first monasteries in Georgia, it was founded in 1106 by King David IV of Georgia as a monastic and educational center.

The monastery is a UNESCO World Heritage Site and was a cultural, educational and scientific center in medieval Georgia. It is an exemplar of the Georgian Golden Age and a gold aesthetic is employed in the paintings and buildings. It was built to celebrate the Orthodox Christian faith in Georgia; some murals found inside the Gelati Monastery church date back to the 12th century.

== Overview and description ==
The monastery is located on a hill several kilometers to the northeast of Kutaisi. It also overlooks the Tskaltsitela Gorge. It is constructed of solid stone, with full archways. The plan of the main monastery was designed in the shape of a cross, the symbol of Jesus's crucifixion and of Christianity. The monastery was designed to be visible over much of the country, with its stone walls constructed to reflect sunlight. There are archways throughout the monastery, including the bell tower.

== History ==
Construction began on the Gelati Monastery in 1106, under the direction of King David IV of Georgia, at which time Kutaisi was the capital of Georgia. It was constructed during the reign of the Byzantine Empire; in this period Christianity was the ruling religion throughout the empire. The monastery's main church, known as the Church of the Blessed Virgin, was completed in 1130, under the reign of David IV's successor, Demetrius I of Georgia, and was dedicated to the Virgin Mary. The monastery is also the burial site of King David IV, near which the Ancient Gates of Ganja, which were taken by King Demetrius I in 1138, can be found. The smaller chapels within the monastery date to the 13th century.

In addition to its religious purpose, the monastery was also constructed to function as an academy of science and education in Georgia: King David IV employed many Georgian scientists, theologians, and philosophers, many of whom had previously been active at various Orthodox monasteries abroad, such as the Mangana Monastery in Constantinople. Among its notable scholars were Ioane Petritsi, who translated several classics of philosophy but is best known for his commentaries on Proclus; and Arsen Ikaltoeli, known for his Dogmatikon, or book of teachings, influenced by Aristotle. The Gelati Academy employed scribes to compile manuscript copies of important works, and people of the time called it "a new Hellas" and "a second Athos".

== Art ==
=== Triptychs ===
Triptychs were popular during the Byzantine Empire and important in Georgian culture. The triptychs represented another form of contribution to the church. Triptychs were a form of iconography for the congregation.

One of the most valuable icons housed in the monastery was the Khakhuli triptych, which was enshrined in the Gelati Monastery from the 12th century until being stolen in 1859. Although returned in 1923, it was in a reduced condition.

=== Mosaics ===
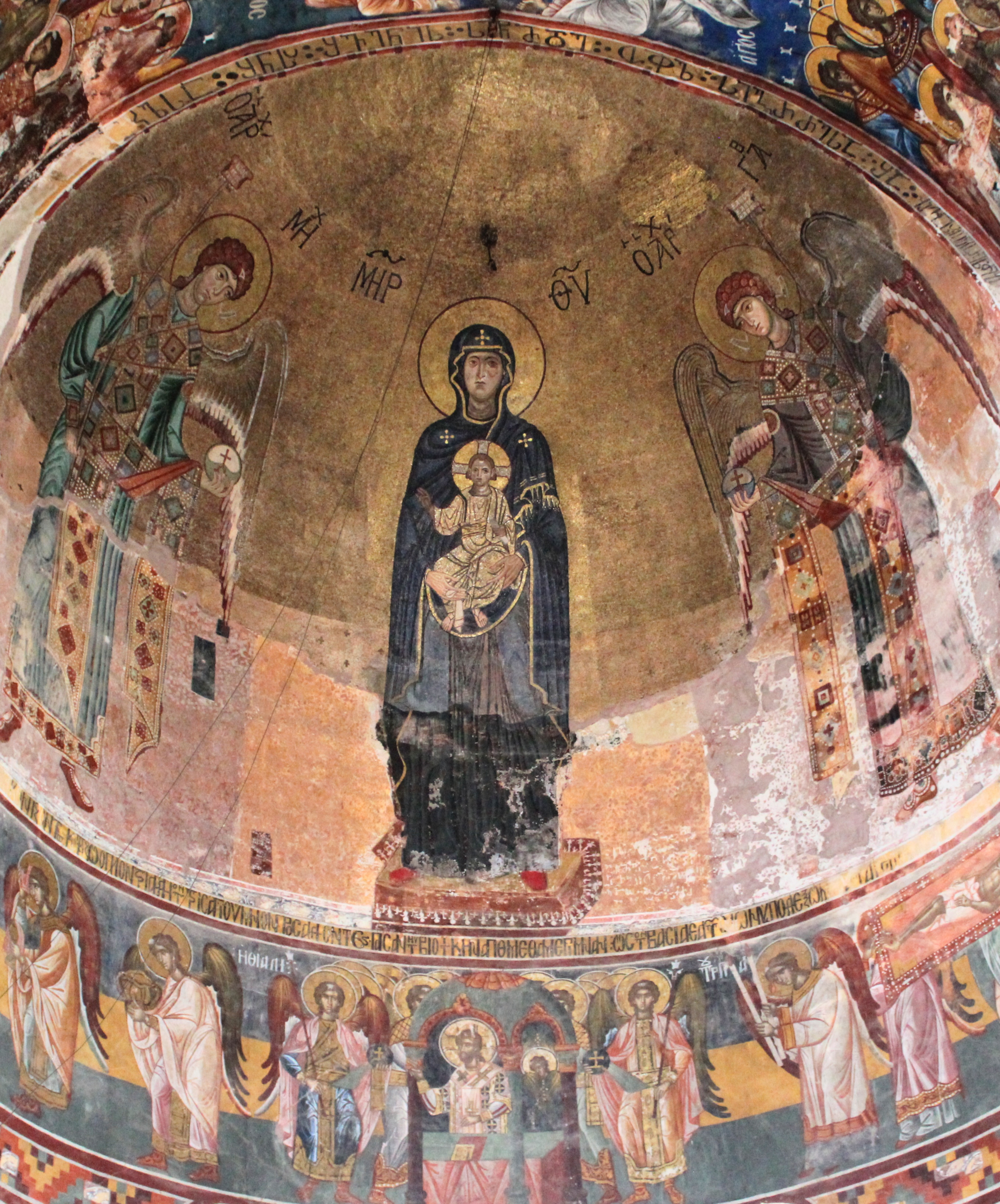
Sanctuary apse Virgin Mary mosaics (12th century) and murals (16th century). Gelati Monastery

The interiors of the monastery hold mosaics in classic Byzantine style illustrating aspects of Christian belief. The largest, a 12th-century masterpiece depicting the Virgin Mary holding the baby Jesus, dominates the apse of the main church, and is an artwork of cultural importance in Georgia. Above the altar is situated a statue of the Virgin Mary, looking down at the baby Jesus she is holding.

== Conservation ==
In 1994, it was inscribed as a World Heritage Site by UNESCO, together with Bagrati Cathedral under a single listing.

The monastery is still active and its churches continue to be regularly used for religious service. Under the supervision of UNESCO the site is being continually restored and protected. All the original structures of the monastery are intact and functional.

The mosaics and murals were damaged prior to UNESCO conservation, but halted when the roof of the academy building was replaced by Georgian conservators. By presidential decree, the monastery was added to the National Register of Monuments for protection and restoration in 2006.

In 2010, the World Heritage Site listing was inscribed on the List of World Heritage in Danger. In 2017, Bagrati Cathedral was delisted from the World Heritage Site, whereas the monastery was removed from the List of World Heritage in Danger and retained its World Heritage status.

== Burials ==
- Demetrius I of Georgia
- David IV
- David V
- Solomon I of Imereti
- Solomon II of Imereti
- George III of Georgia
- Vakhtang II
- Bagrat V of Georgia
- Bagrat VI
- Bagrat III of Imereti
- David IX
- George V of Georgia
- Alexander II of Imereti
- George of Chqondidi
- Tamar of Georgia

== Gallery ==
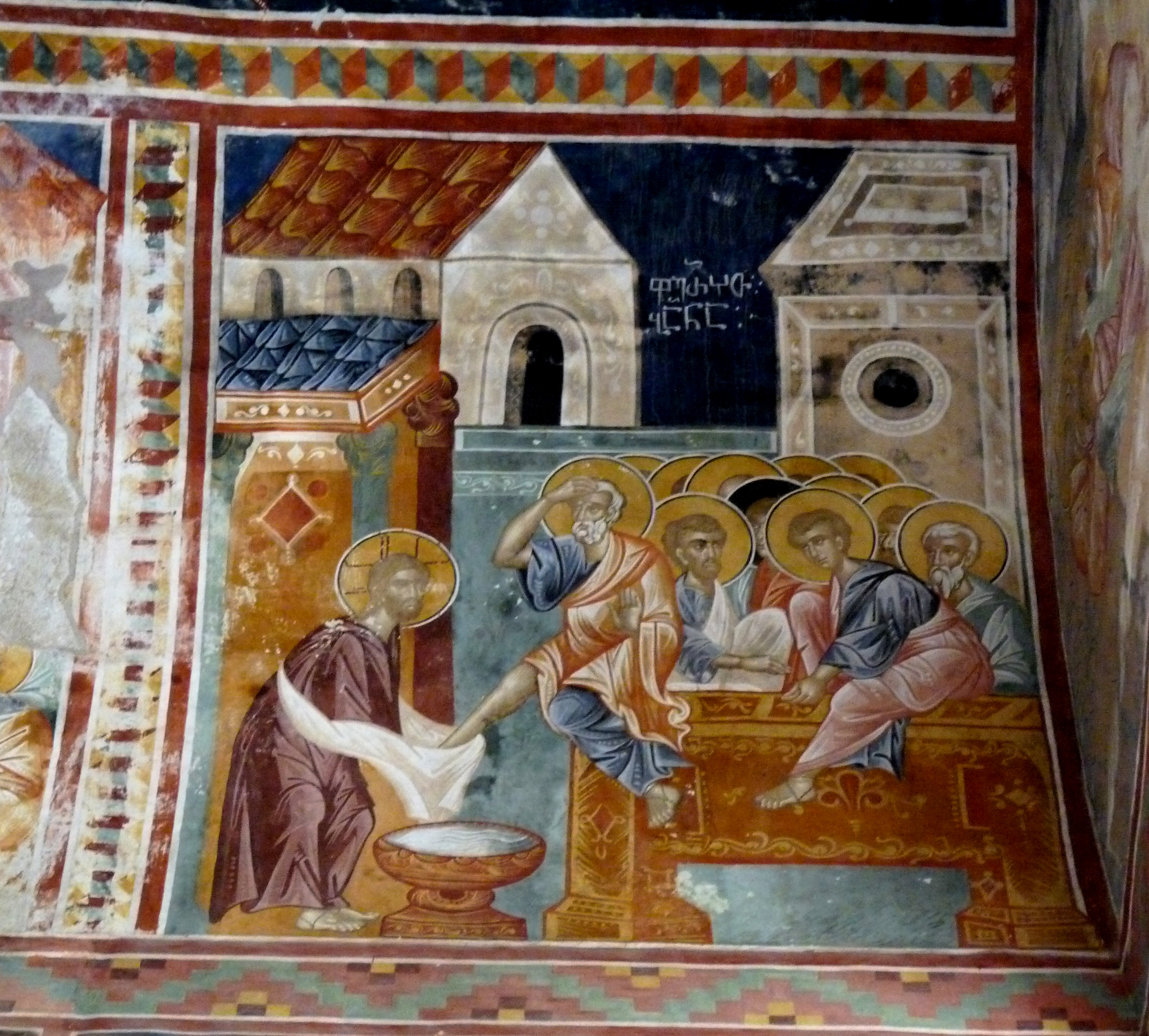
The Maundy, mural

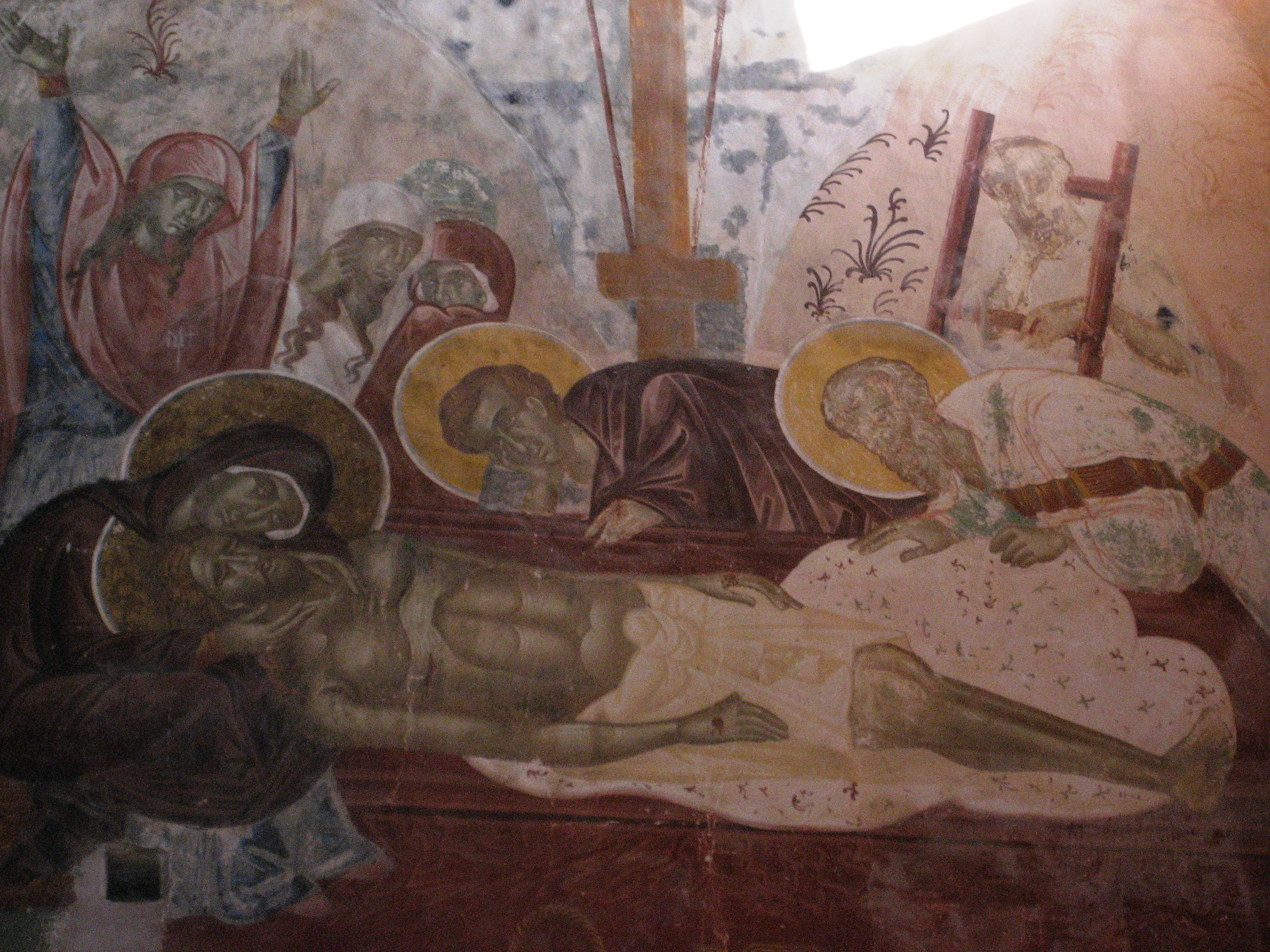
The Lamentation of Christ, mural

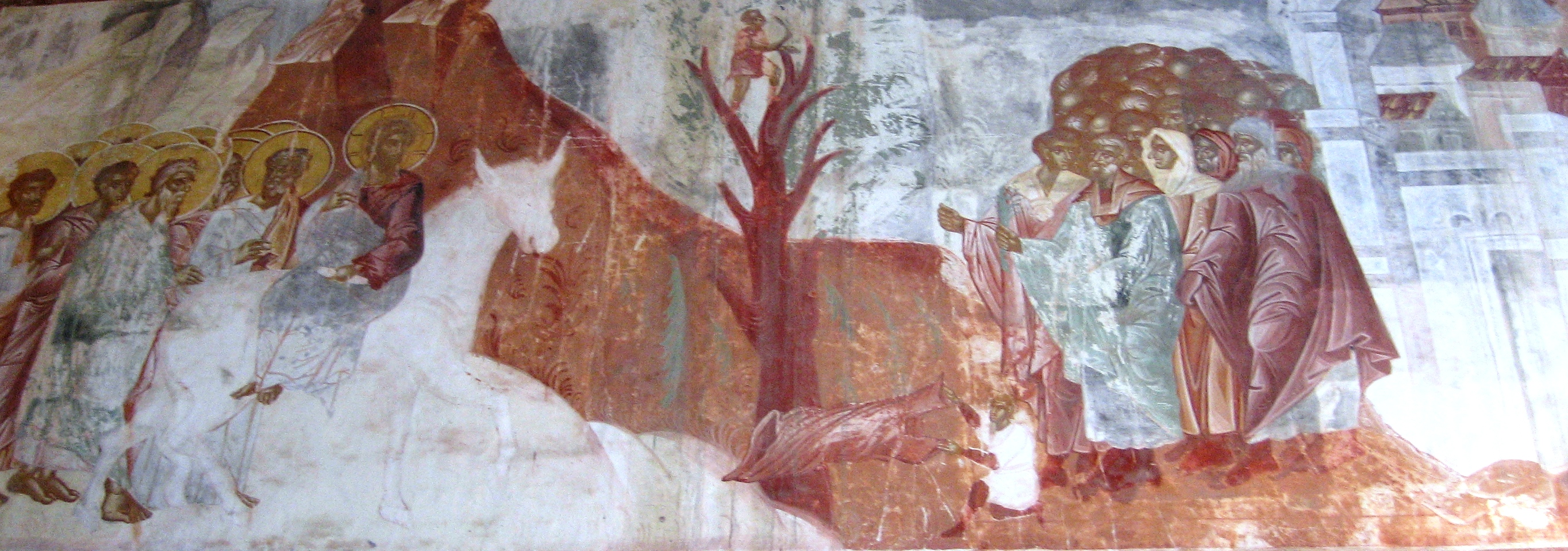
The Palm Sunday, mural

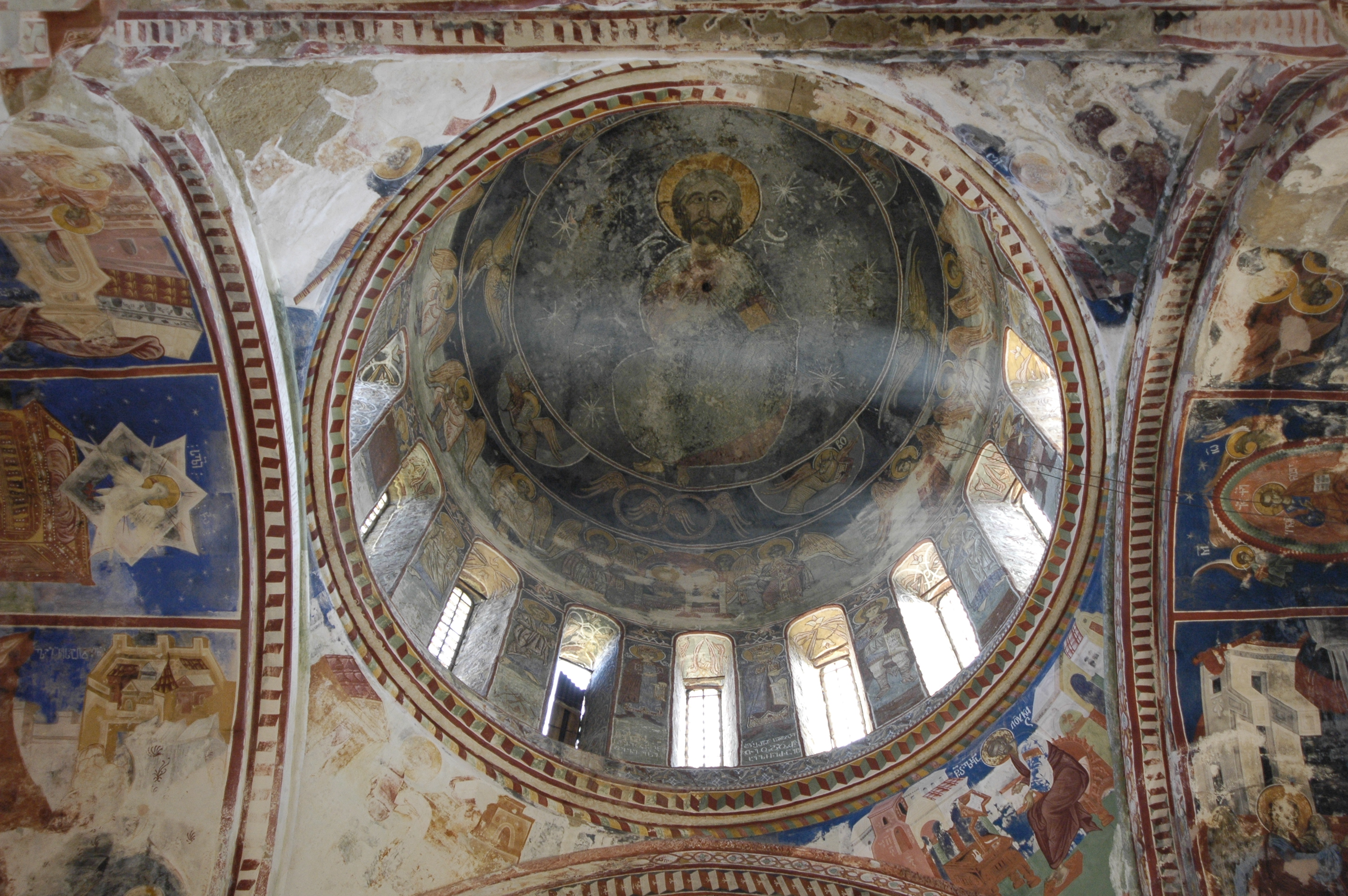
Gelati monastery, church of Virgin Mary the Blessed. Mural of Christ Pantokrator on ceiling of the central dome (12th century)

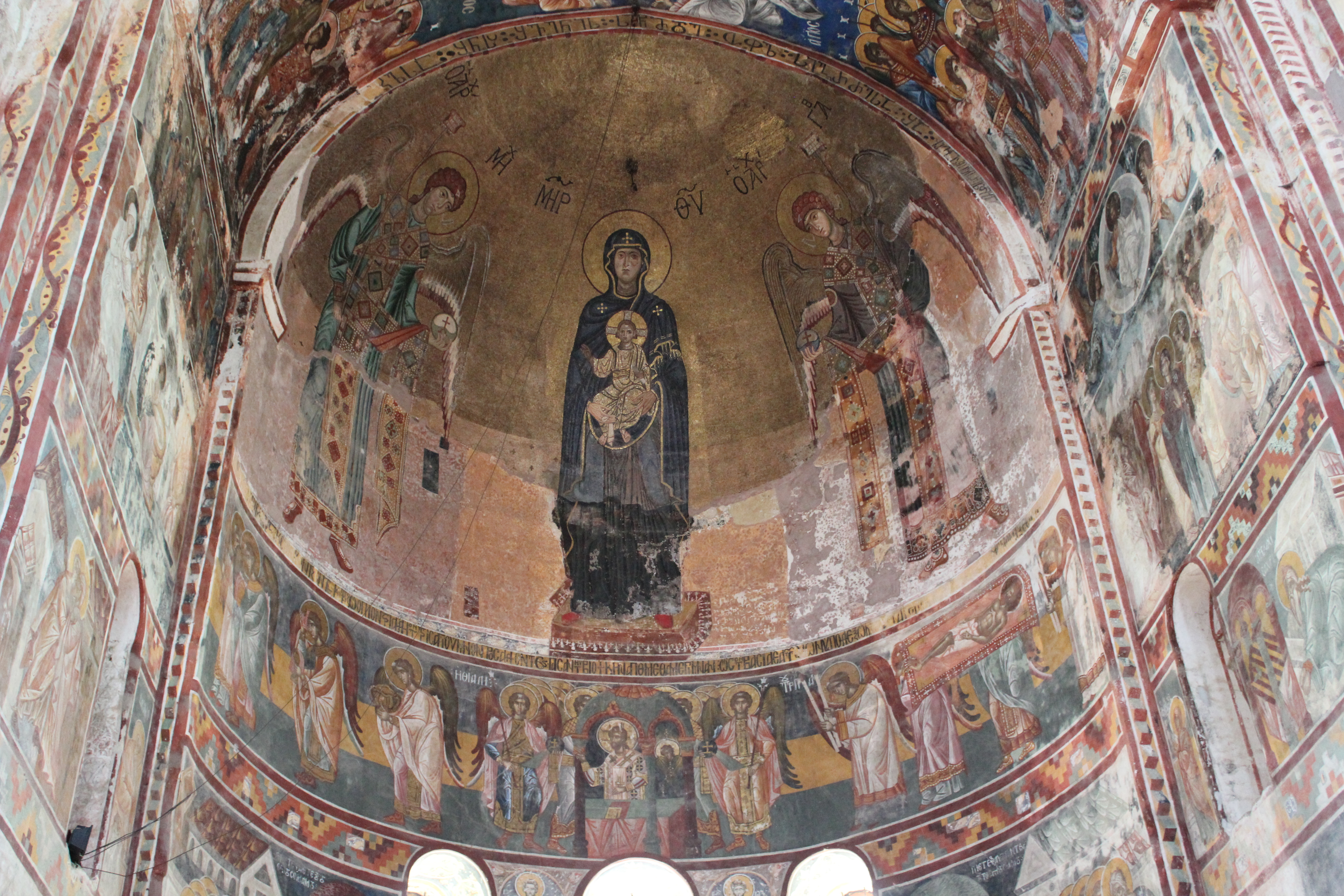
Gelati monastery, Church of Virgin the Blessed, mosaic and mural in the apse depicting Theotokos, Archangels Michael and Gabriel. Arc de Triomphe

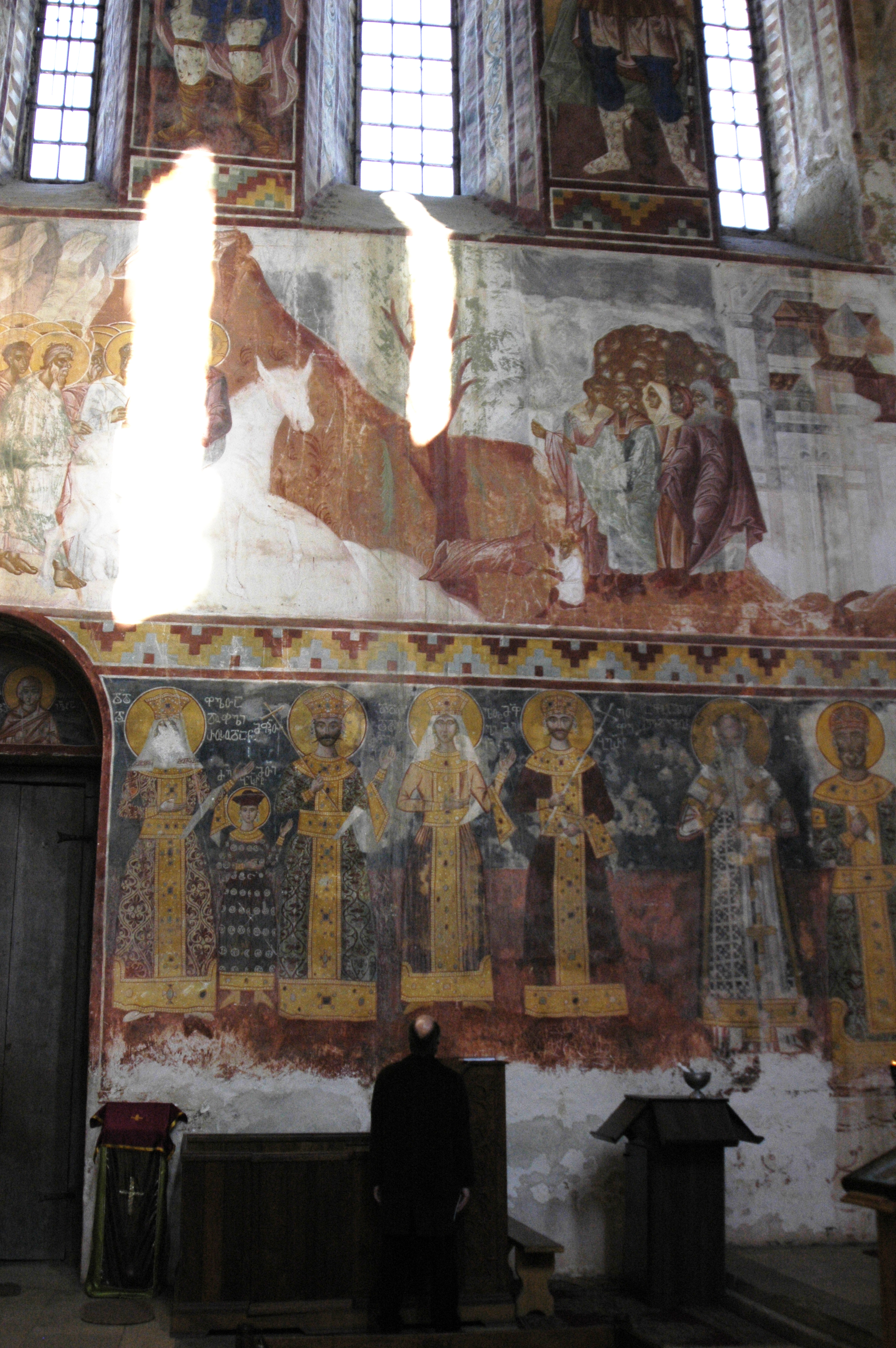
Gelati monastery, Church of Virgin the Blessed. Mural on north wall. From left to right: Queen Rusudan, Prince Bagrat, King George II, Queen Helen, King Bagrat III of Imereti, Catholicos Yevdemon Chetidze, David the Builder

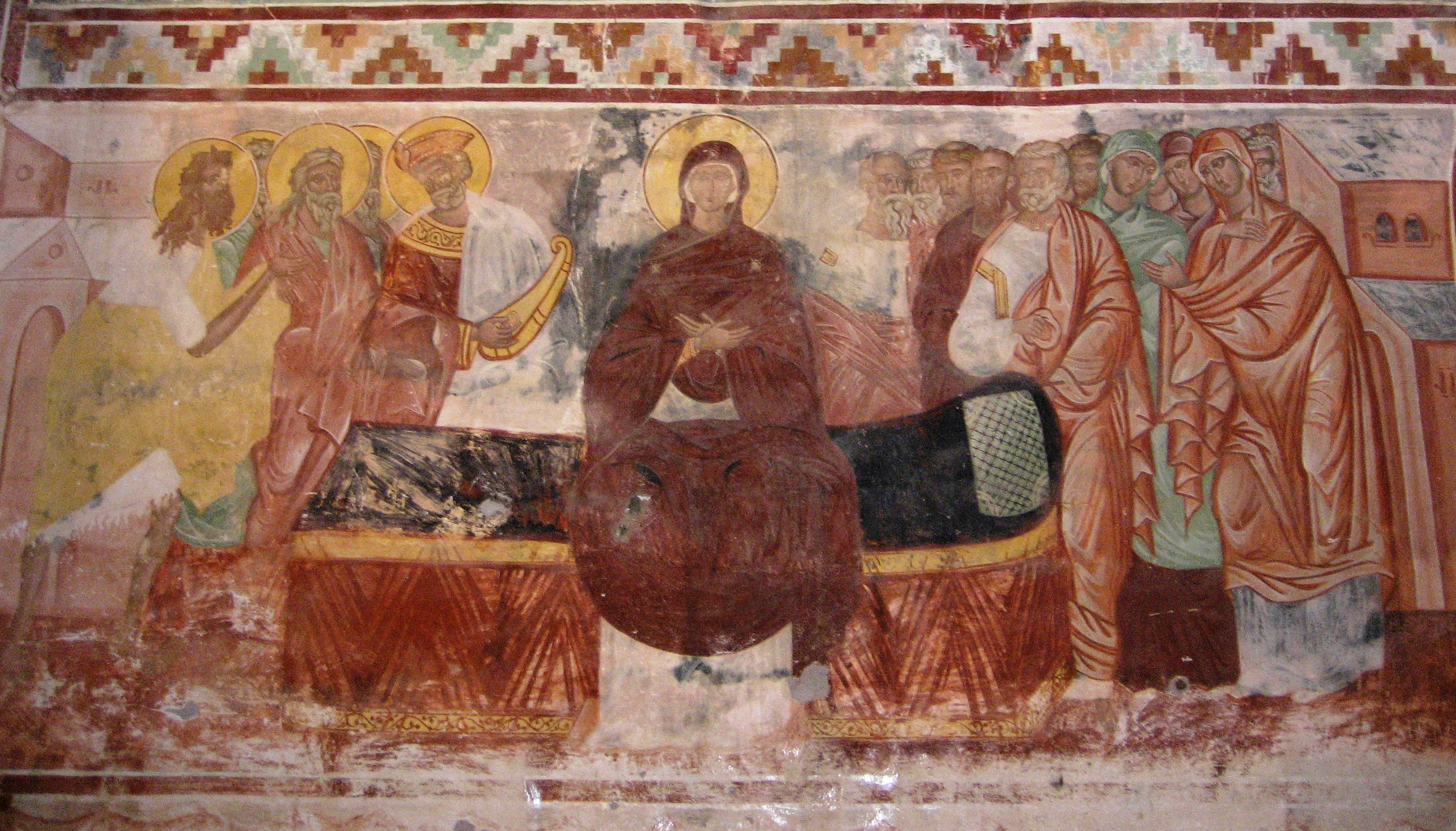
Frescoes in the cathedral

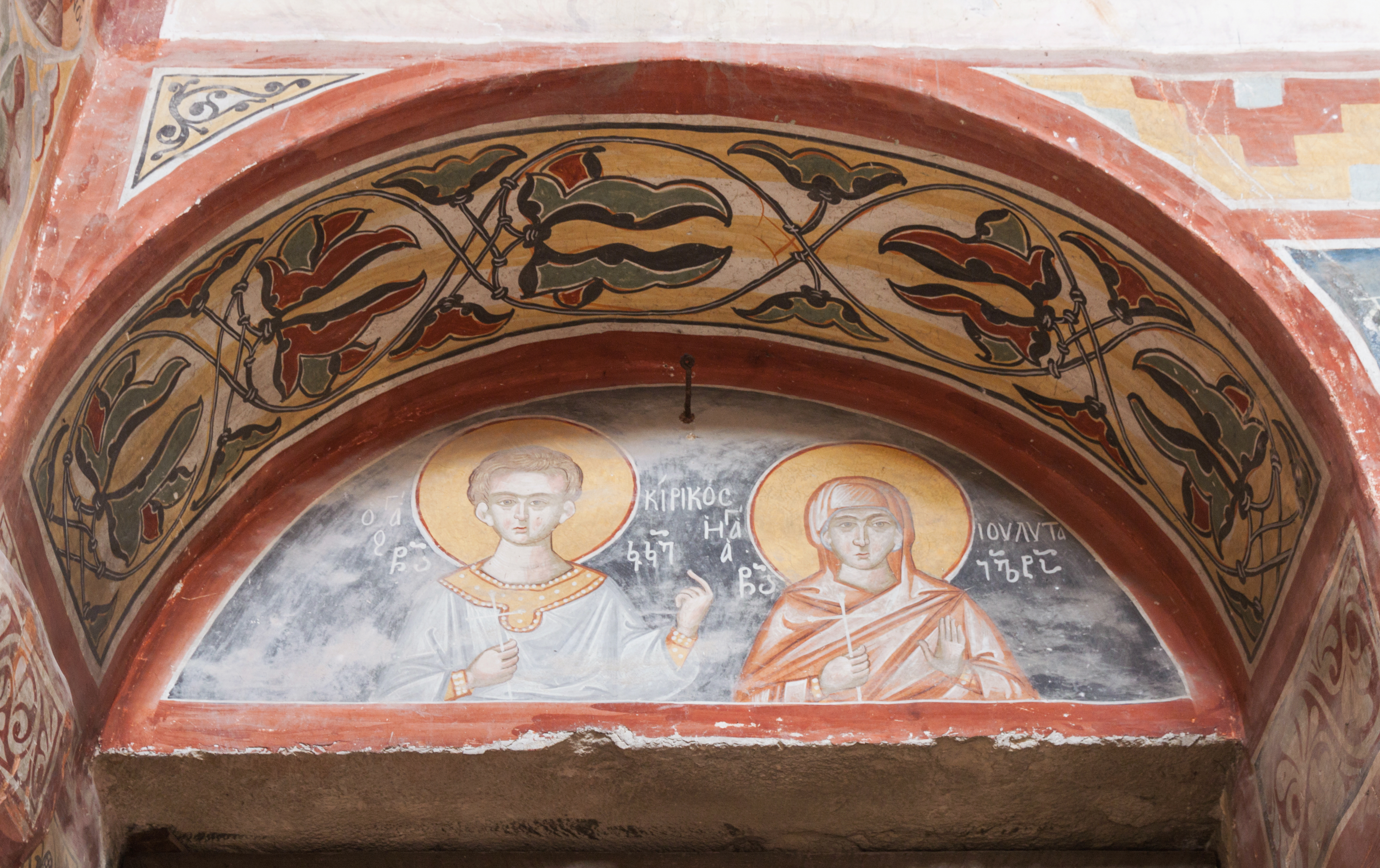
Frescoes in the cathedral

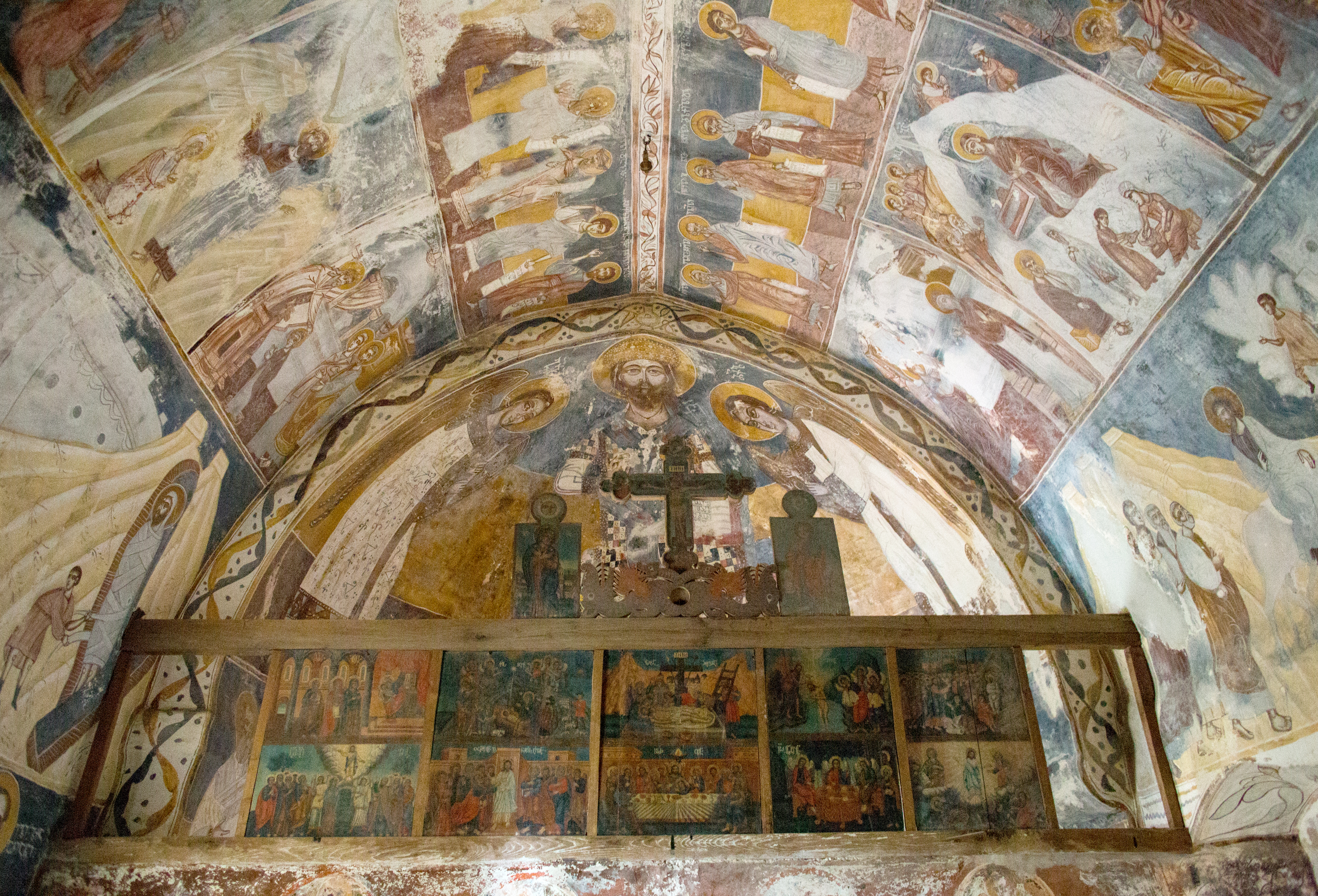
Frescoes in the cathedral

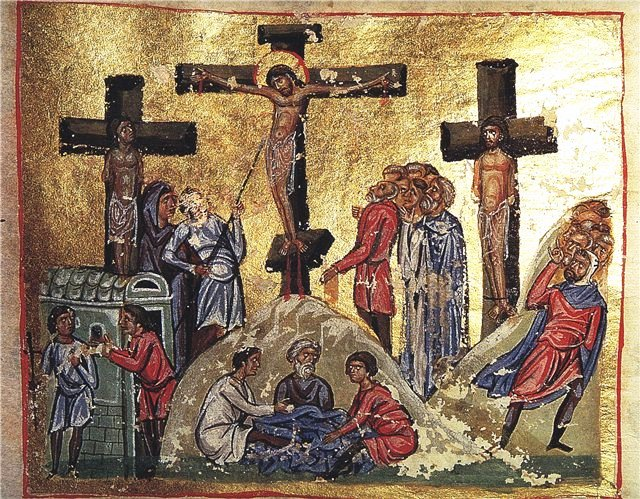
The Crucifixion in the Medieval Georgian Gospel Manuscript from Gelati

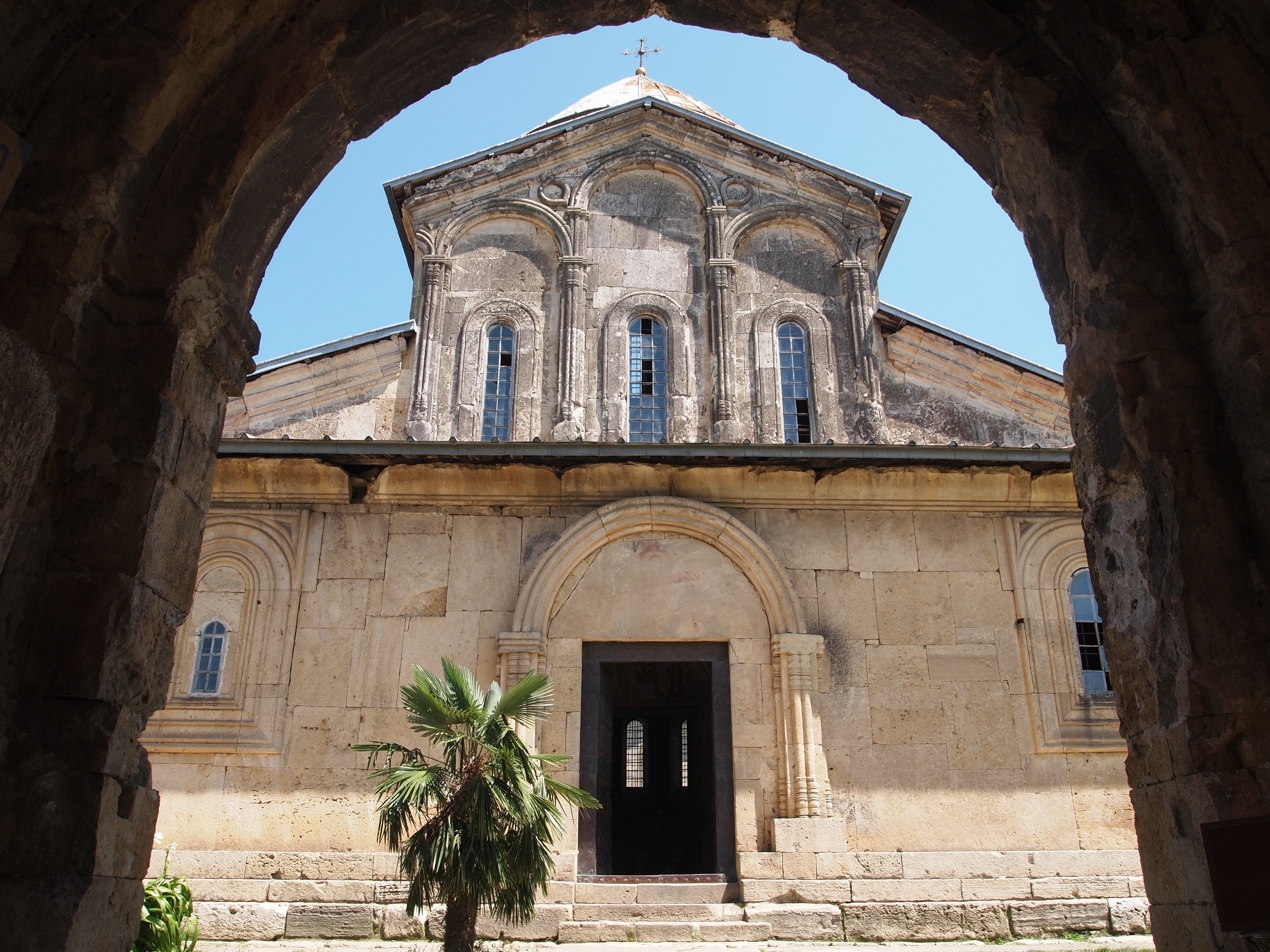
Gelati Monastery

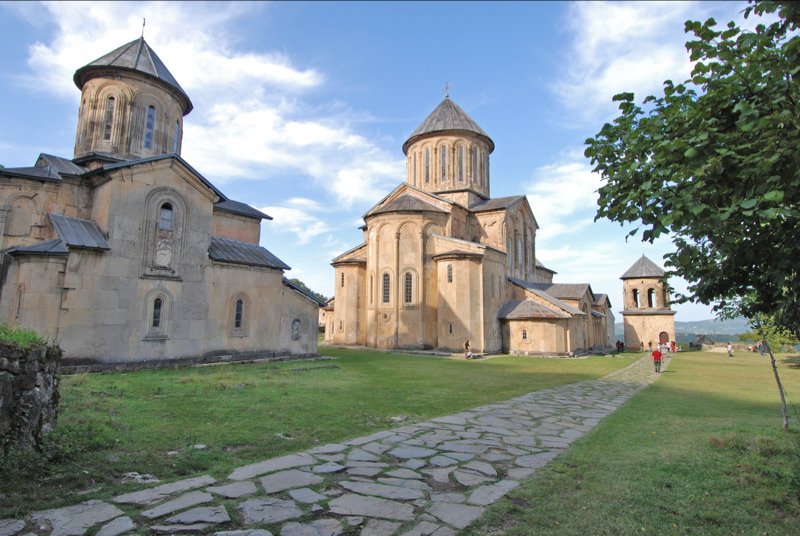
Gelati Monastery

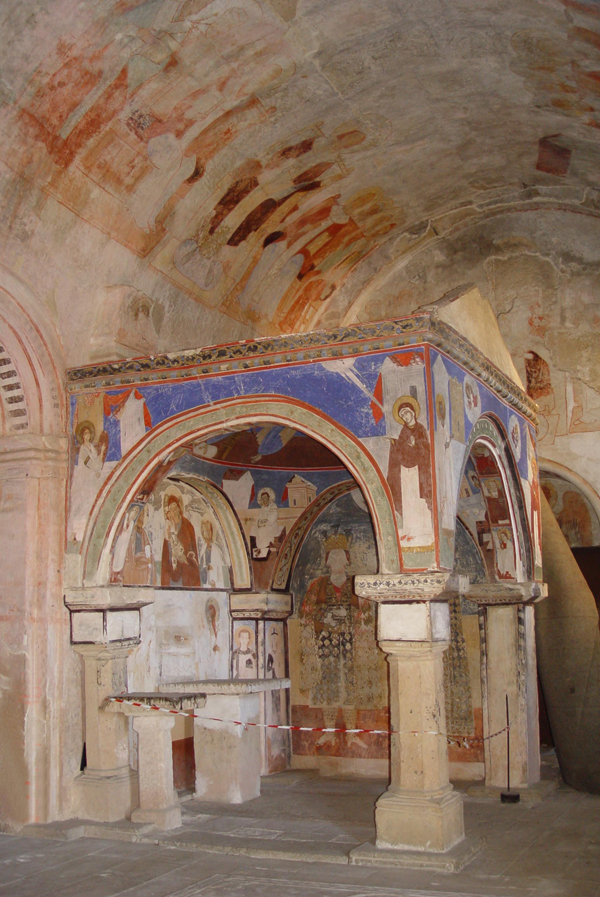
Shrine in the monastery church

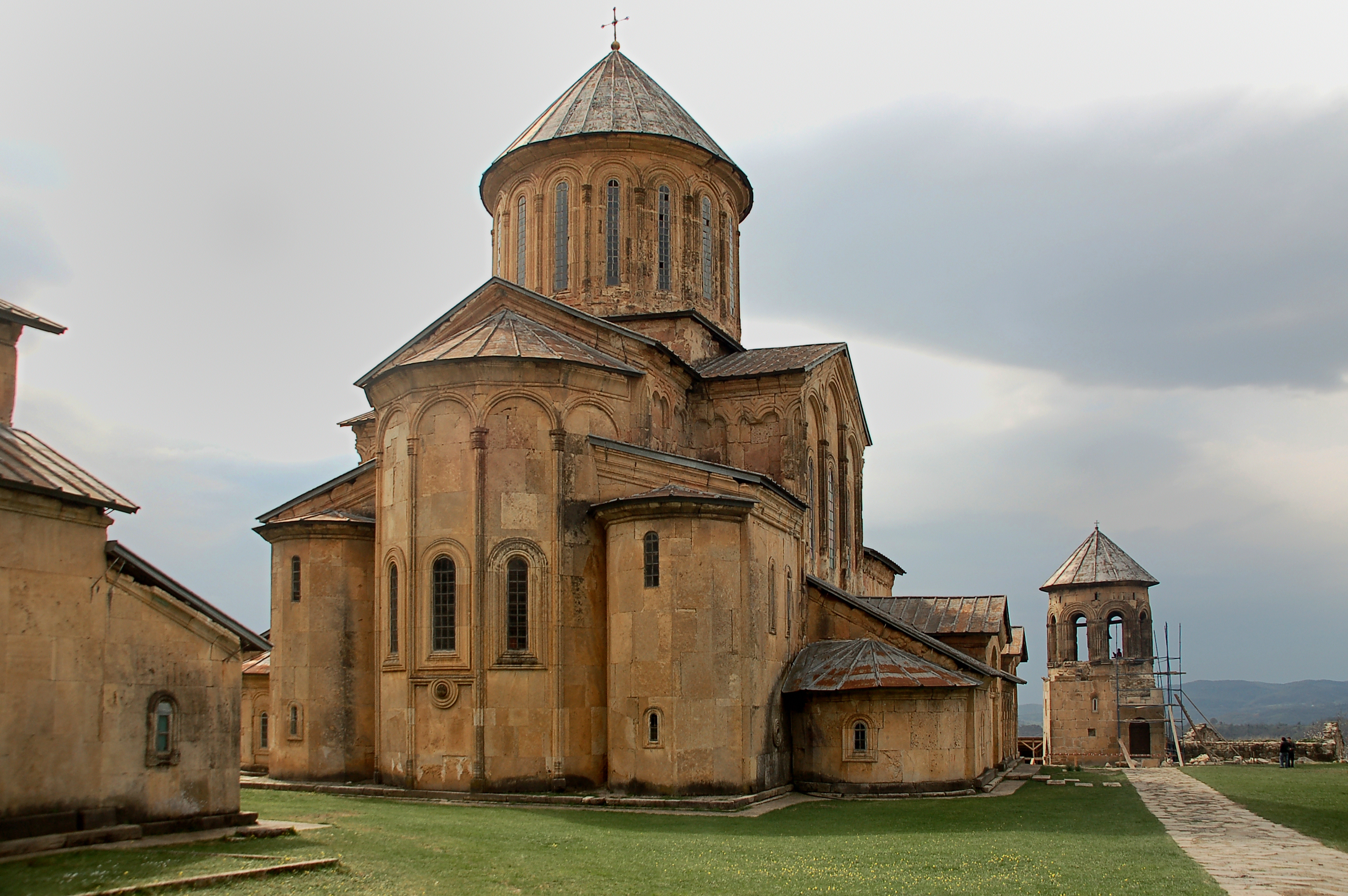
Gelati Monastery

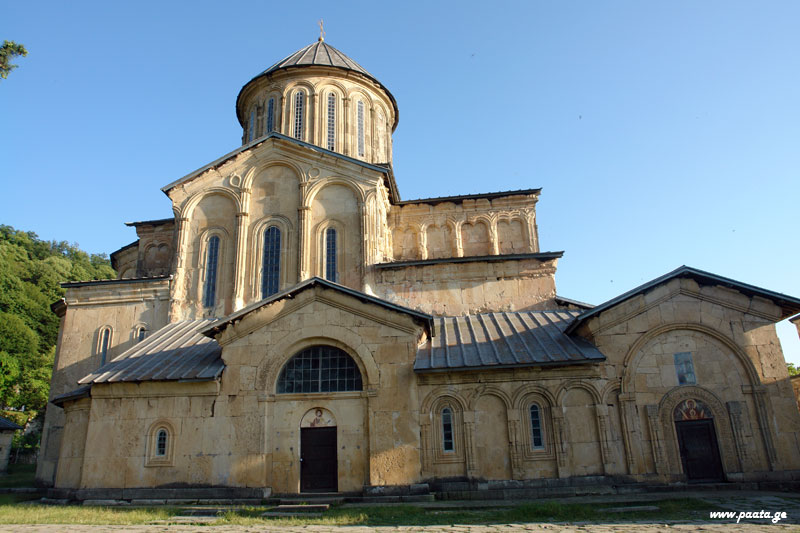
Gelati Monastery

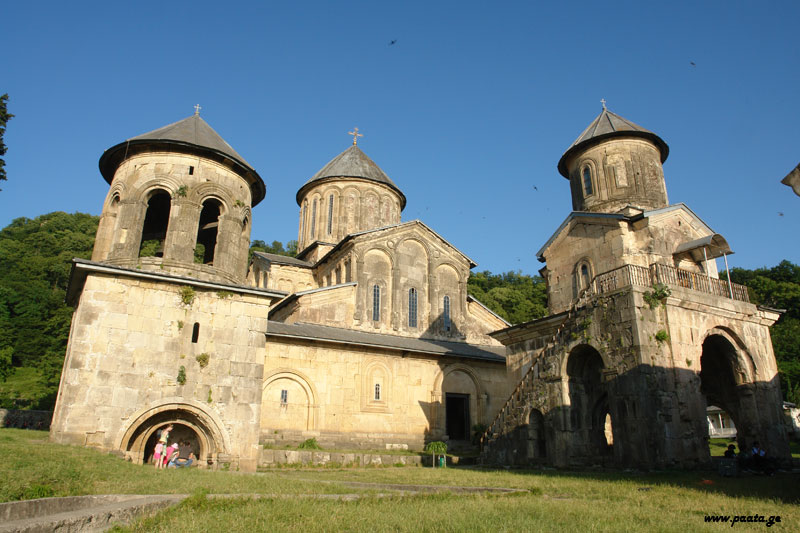
Gelati Monastery

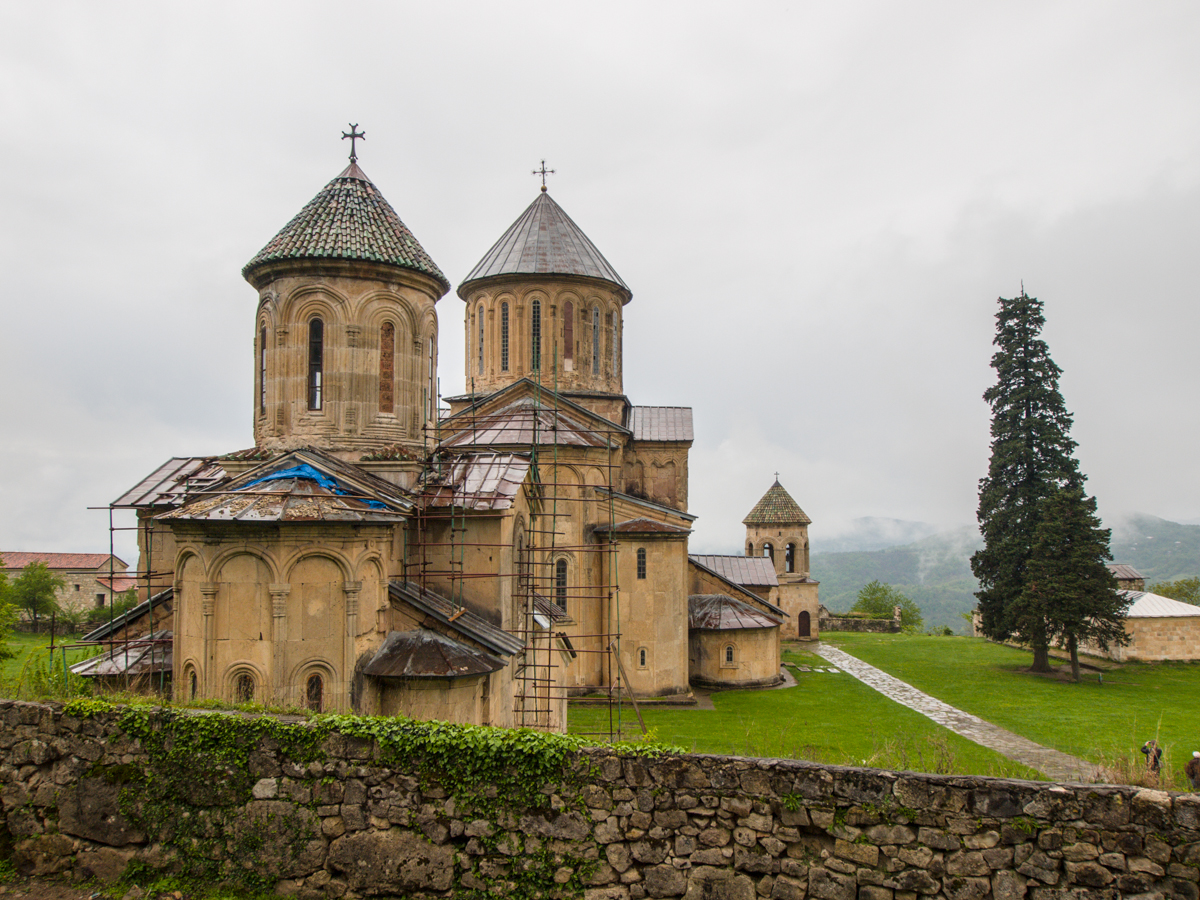
Gelati Monastery

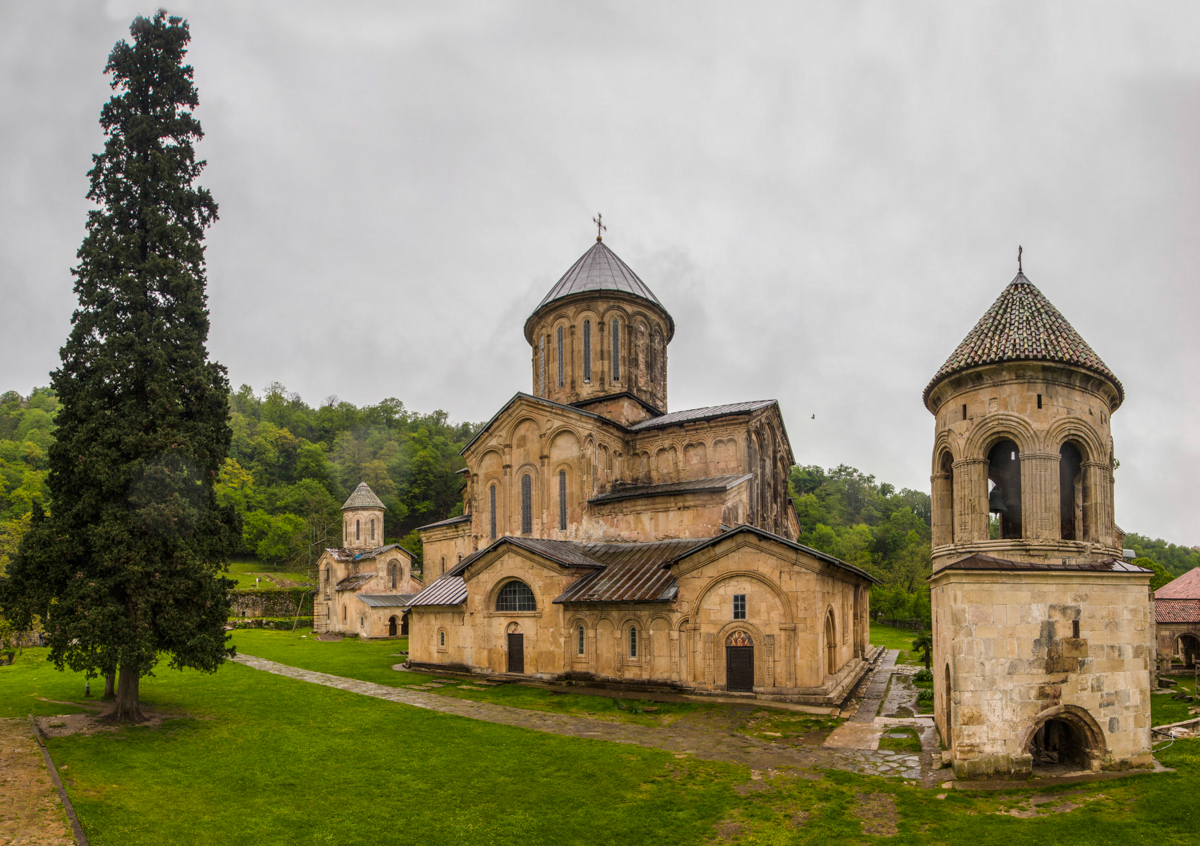
Gelati Monastery

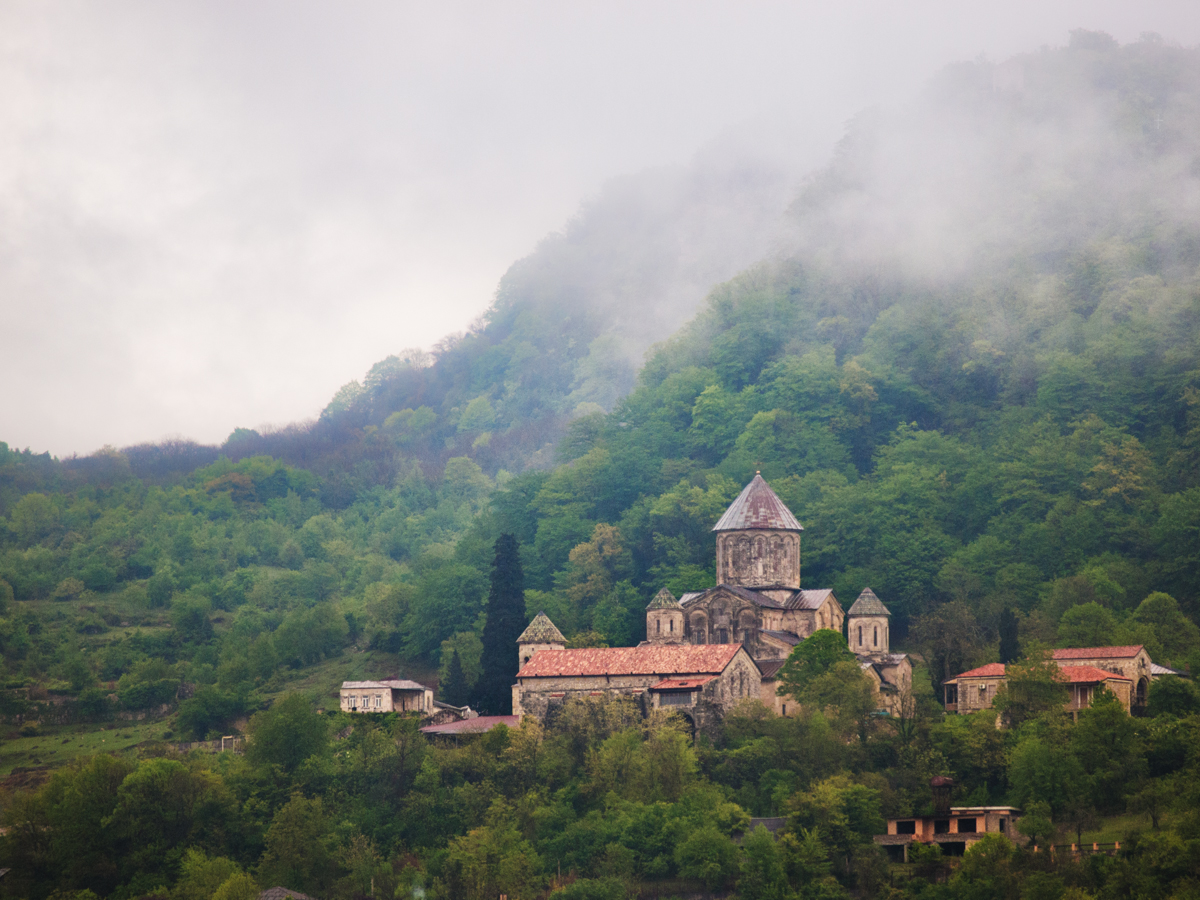
Gelati Monastery

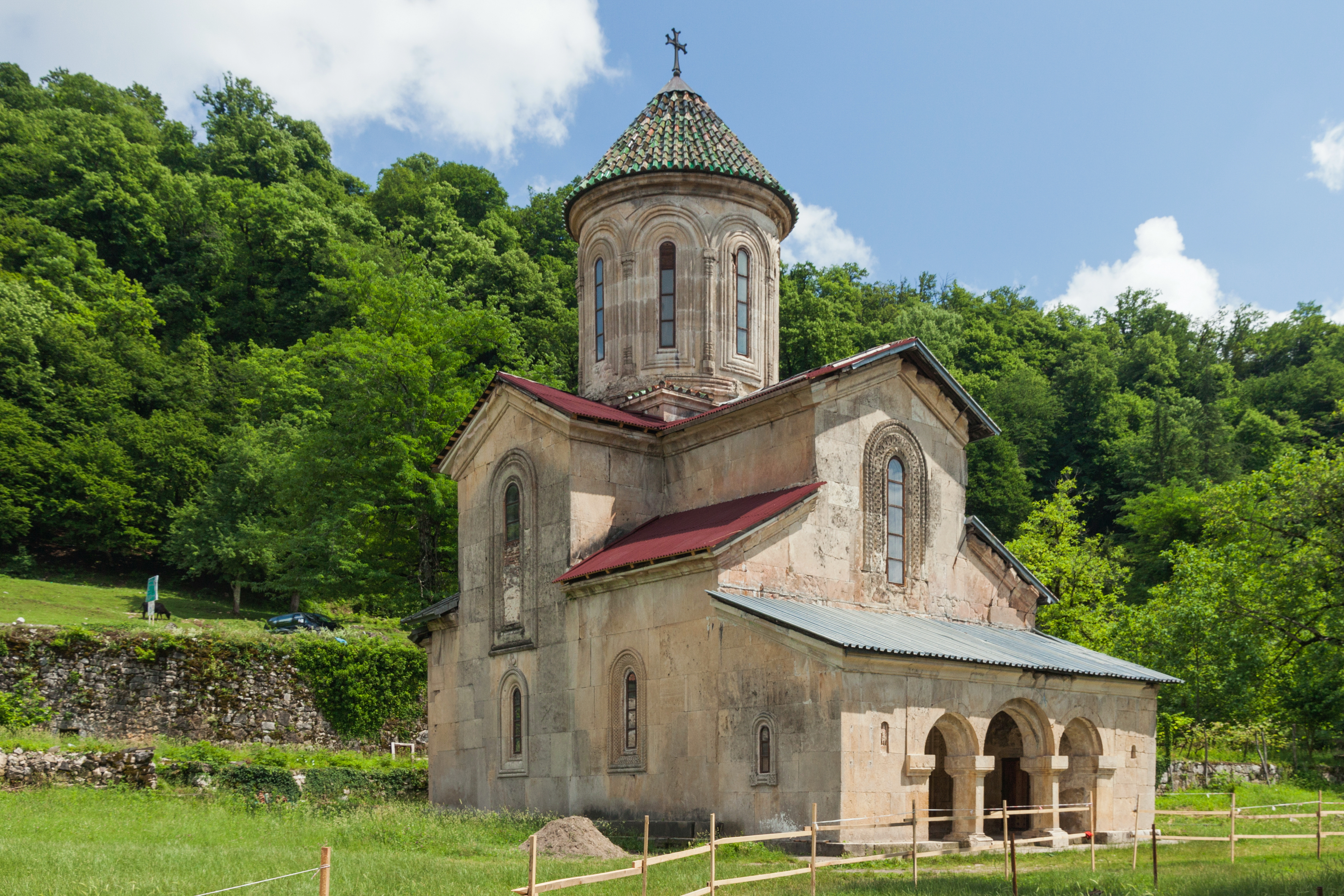
St. George church

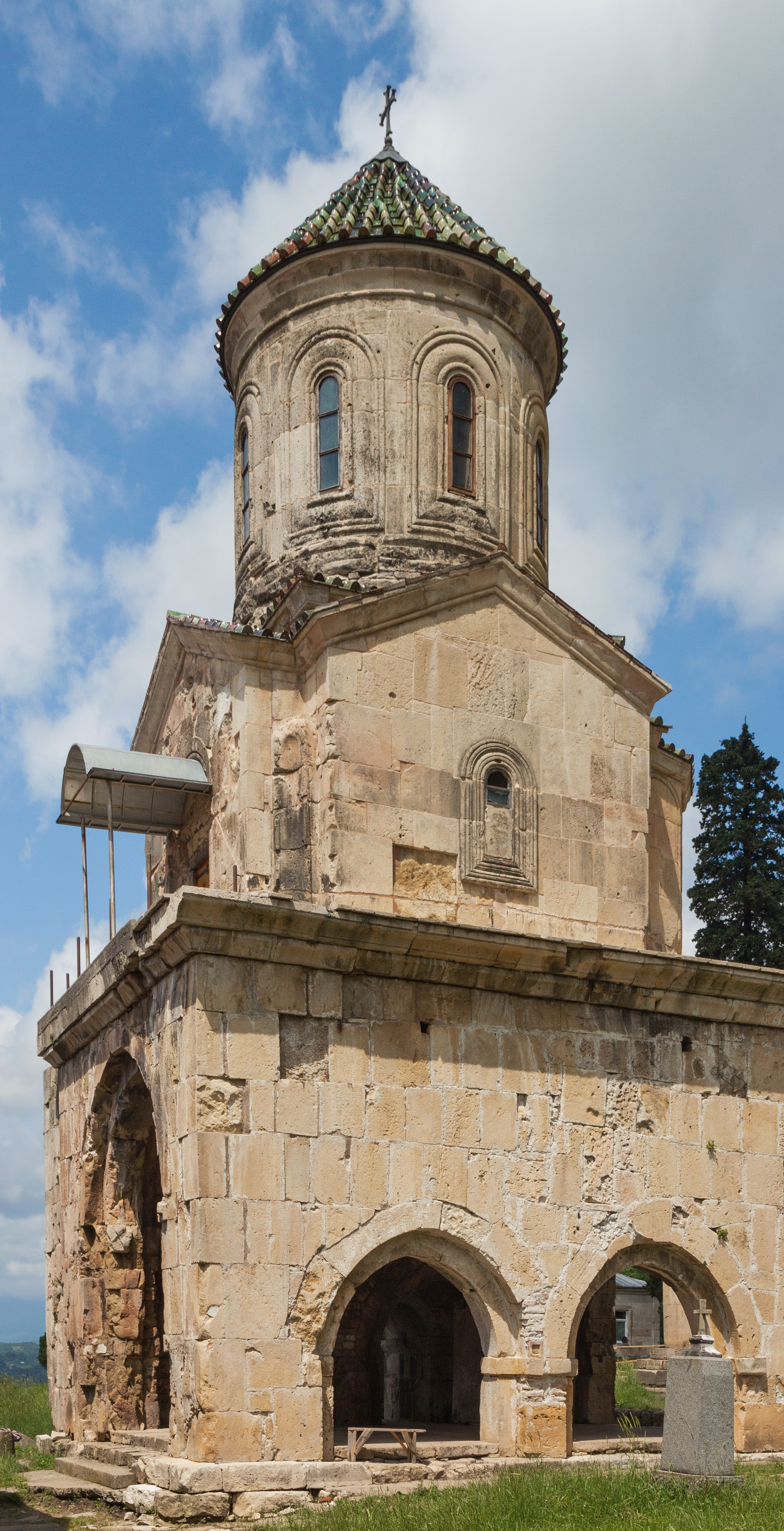
St. Nicholas church

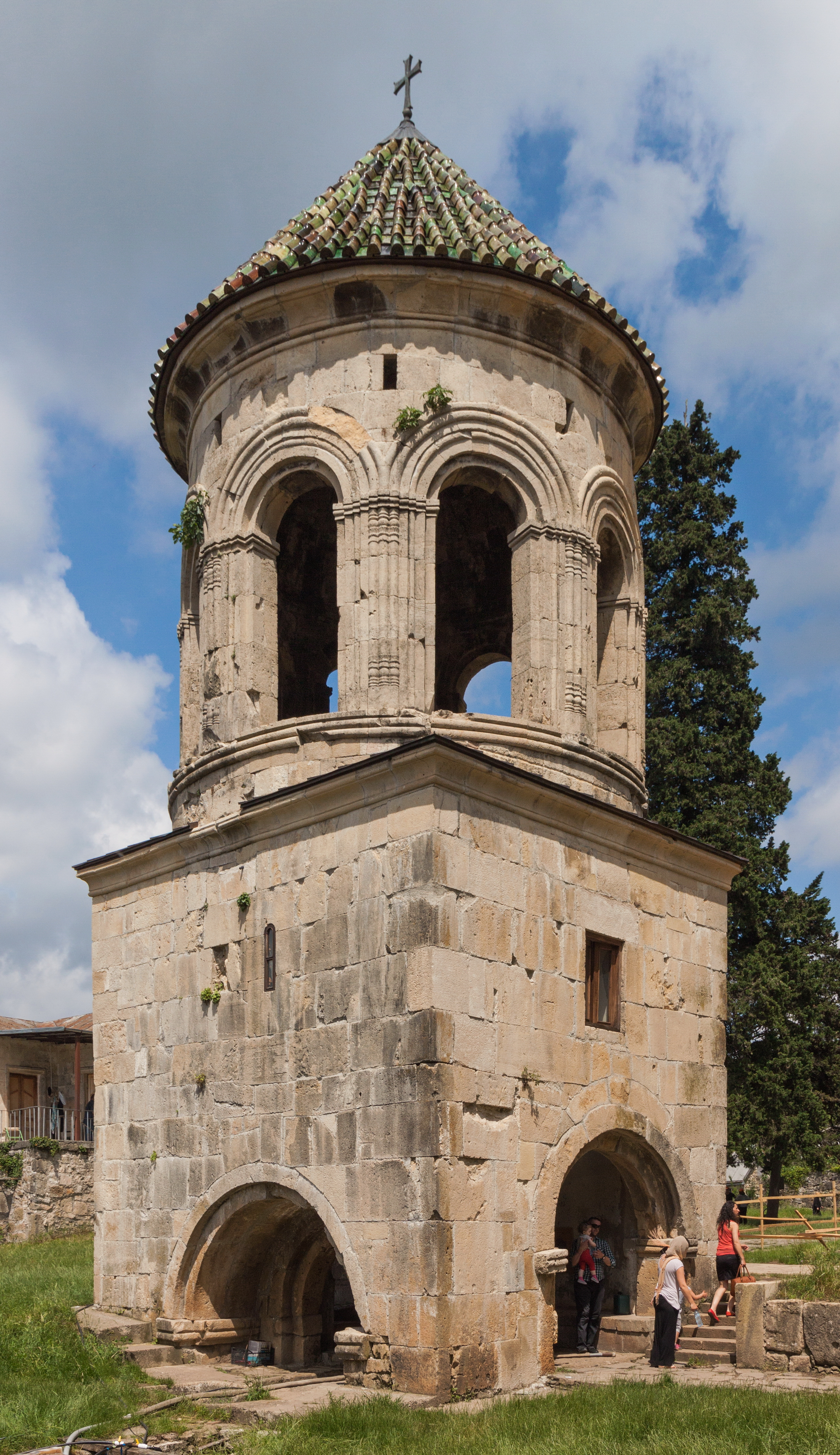
Belfry

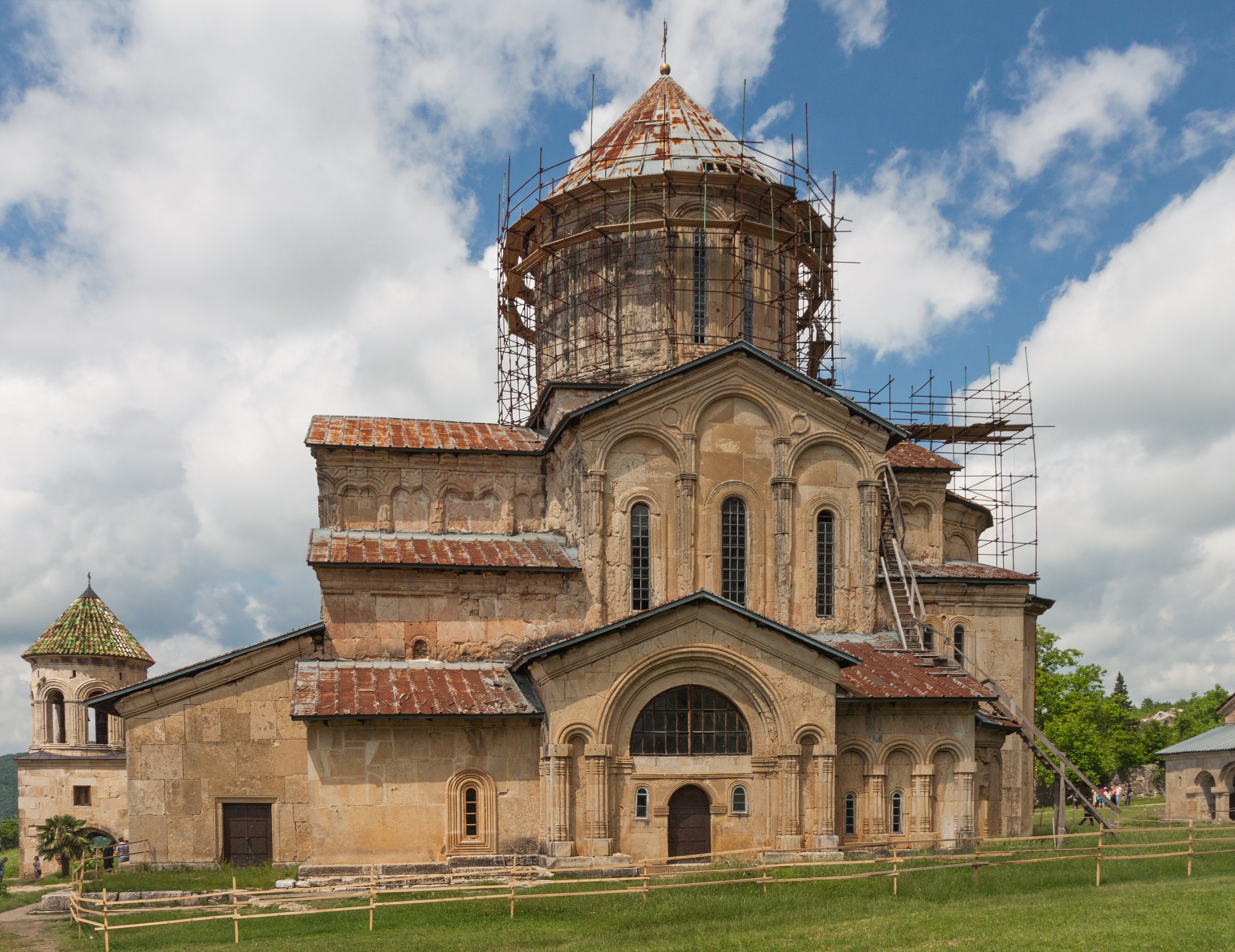
Cathedral of the Nativity of the Virgin

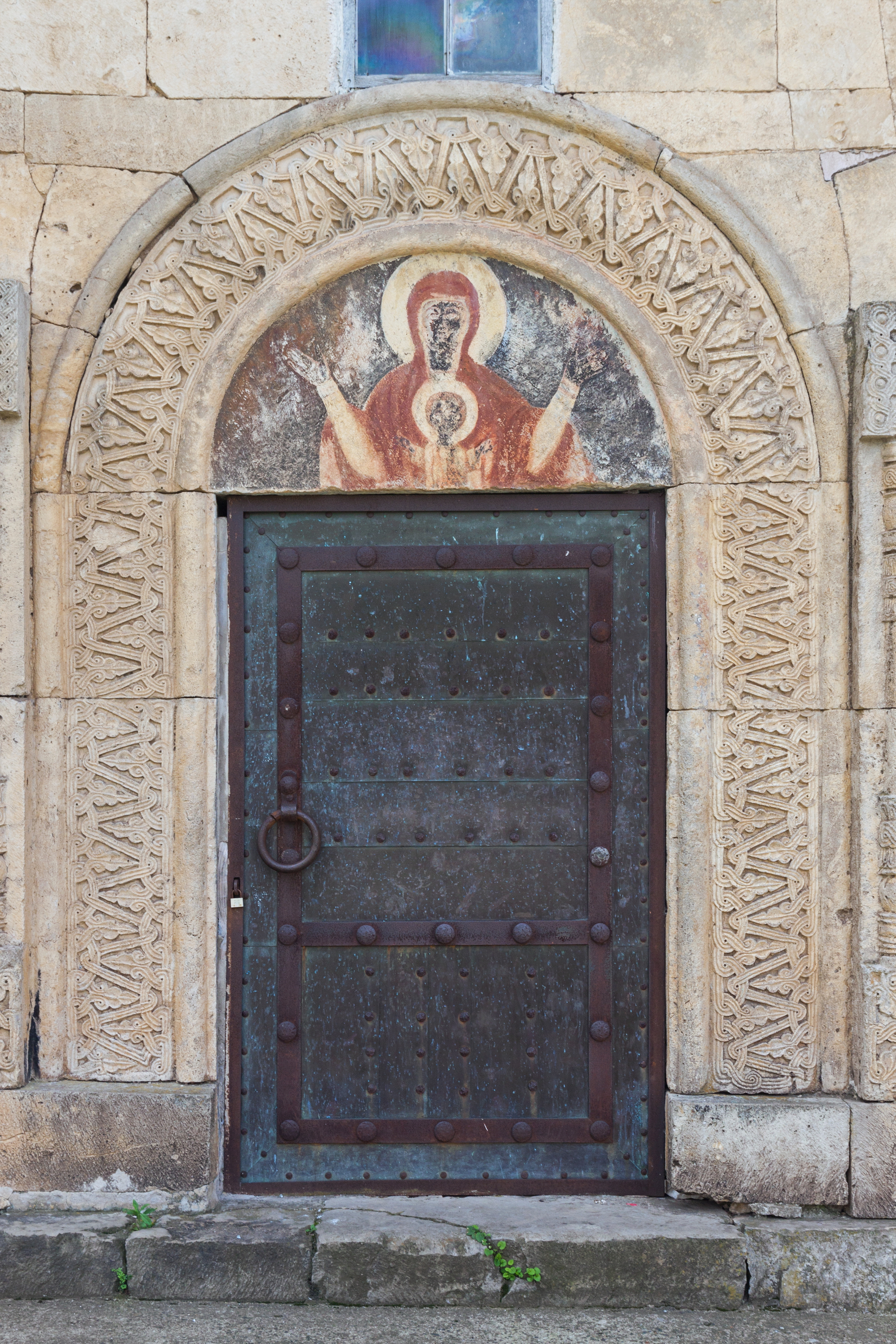
Portal in the cathedral

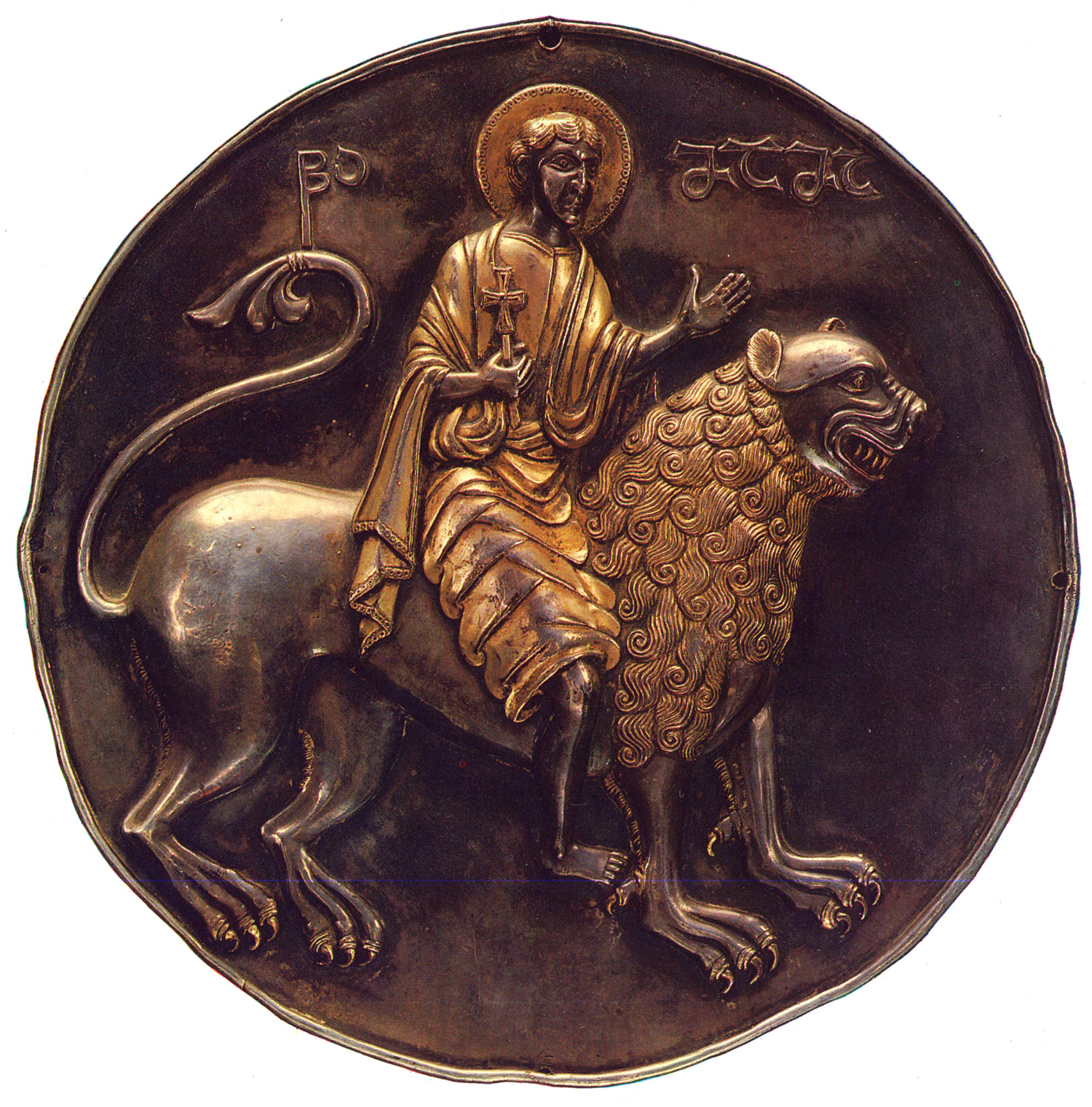
Tondo of Saint Mammes from Gelati Monastery, 14th–15th centuries

== See also ==
- Culture of Georgia
- Georgian Orthodox and Apostolic Church
- Motsameta monastery
- World Heritage Sites in Danger
