= Tahmasp I's Kakhetian and Kartlian campaigns =

Military campaigns conducted by I Tahmasp

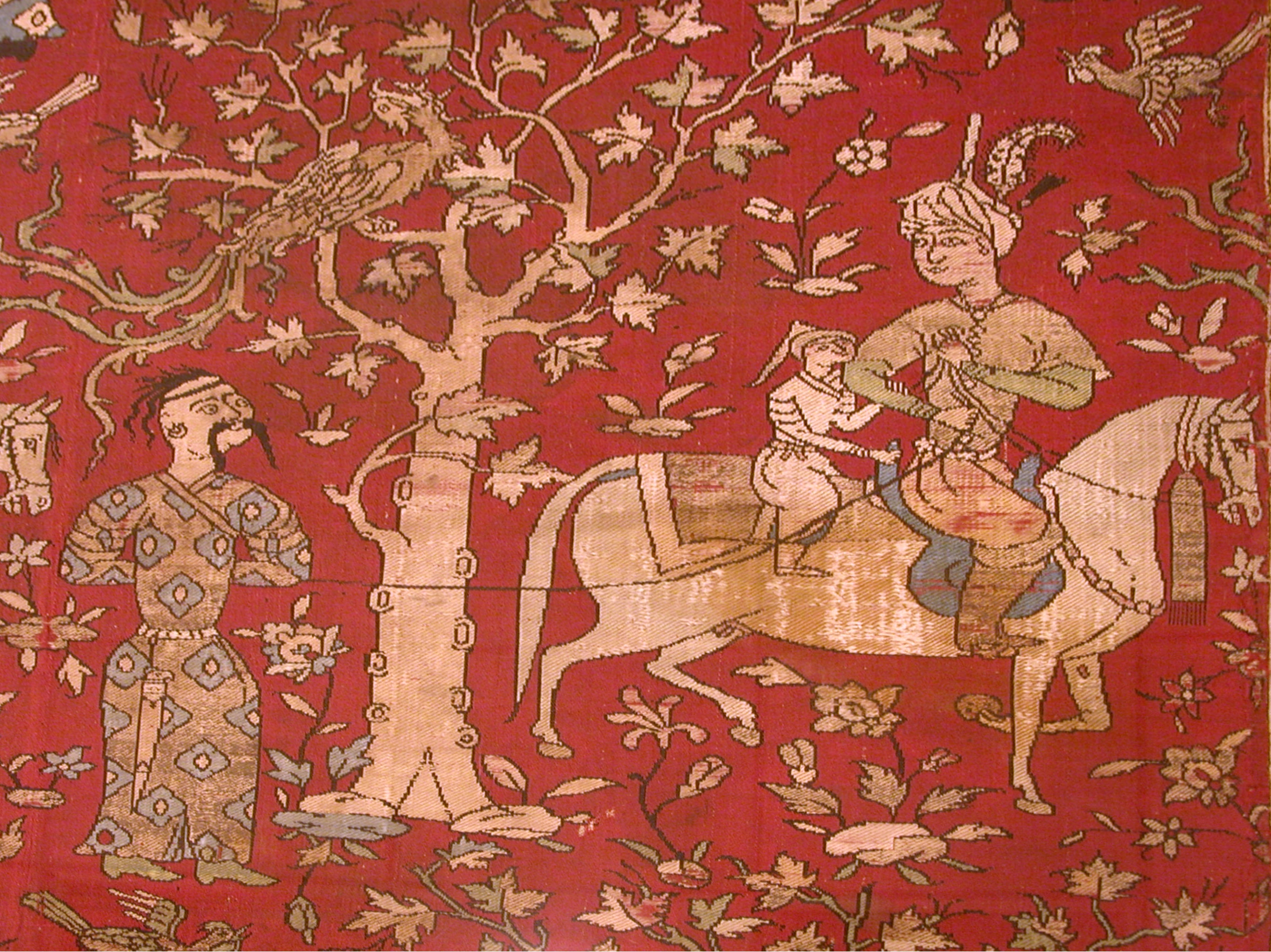
- Safavid courtier leading Georgian captives in the military campaigns between 1540 and 1553. Persian tapestry of the mid-16th century.
Date	1541–1566
Location	Kartli and Kakheti
Result	Safavid victory

Belligerents
Kingdom of Kartli; Kingdom of Kakheti	Safavid Iran

Commanders and leaders
Luarsab I †; Simon I (Kingdom of Kakheti) Levan (Kingdom of Kakheti) Prince George †	Tahmasp I Badr Khan Ustajlu; Shahverdi Sultan †; Daud Khan

The Tahmasp I's Kakhetian and Kartlian campaigns was a series of campaigns of the Safavid Iran under the leadership of Shah Tahmasp I against the Georgian Kingdoms of Kartli and Kakheti.

Georgia was one of the regions that sparked the interest of Shah Tahmasp. One of the reasons for this was to diminish the power of the Ustajlu tribe, who held the territories of present-day southern Georgia and Armenia, although another motive was plunder. Attacks on predominantly Christian Georgian territories were often motivated by jihad. During Shah Tahmasp's initial march, Tbilisi was plundered, its churches, Georgian nobles' wealth, children, and wives were seized as booty. Additionally, eventually, the rulers of cities like Tbilisi and Golbada were compelled to accept Shiism. King Luarsab I managed to escape and hide during Tahmasp's marches. The objective of the second march was to establish stable Qizilbash rule in Georgian territories. Again, through raids and plundering observed during the march, King Levan of Kakheti was subdued, and he pledged allegiance to the Shah. Another march took place a year before the Treaty of Amasya. In each of these marches, along with a considerable amount of booty seized, Qizilbash forces also obtained numerous captives upon their return. Sources report that in one march, 30,000 captives were seized. Among these captives was Luarsab's mother, Nestan Darejan, who committed suicide after being taken captive. Some of these captives later managed to integrate into the Safavid bureaucracy.

In 1555, according to the Treaty of Amasya, Eastern Georgia remained under the rule of the Qizilbash. In subsequent campaigns, Shah Tahmasp did not personally participate; instead, the representation of Qizilbash rule in the region was entrusted to Shahverdi Sultan Ziyadoghlu Qajar. He generally ruled over the territories north of the Aras River. To maintain his authority in the region, Tahmasp sought to convert influential figures in Kartli and Kakheti to Shiism. For example, Daud Khan, brother of Simon I, serves as an example. Prince Jesse, the son of Levan of Kakheti, also came to Qazvin in the 1560s and embraced Shiism. In return, Shah Tahmasp bestowed gifts and positions upon him. He was given a palace in Qazvin and appointed as the ruler of Sheki and its surrounding areas. The conversion of these Georgian princes to Shiism did not hinder Kartli rulers like Luarsab I and his son Simon from continuing their resistance against the Qizilbash, who were attempting to regain Tbilisi. The outcome of the Battle of Garisi, where these Georgian rulers fought against the Qizilbash, resulted in a Georgian pyrrhic victory.

== Background ==
Military campaigns to Georgia, primarily centered around Azerbaijan and Eastern Anatolia-based states, had become commonplace since the 15th century and even earlier. Shah Ismail's maternal grandfather, Uzun Hasan of the Aq Qoyunlu, conducted major campaigns into Georgia on three occasions—1458, 1461, and 1476. Shah Ismail himself, even after the defeat at the Battle of Chaldiran, sent armies into Georgian territories. Several reasons contributed to these frequent campaigns, with the primary one being the geographical location of the region. The rivalry between the Ottoman and Safavid empires motivated them to create a buffer zone, and Georgia served as such a region. During Tahmasp 's reign, one of the reasons for the campaigns was the necessity for plunder within the Qizilbash army. However, the main reason for his initial campaign was entirely different; it aimed to elevate the cohesion and combat morale within the Qizilbash army by successfully conducting a military campaign. The lack of political and military unity in the fragmented Georgian kingdoms made them easy targets for the larger and more organized armies of the Ottomans and Safavids.

The Christian population of Georgia served as legitimate targets for surrounding Turkic-Muslim states. These states often utilized jihad as a means to secure their political legitimacy, allowing them to impose taxes and levies on non-Muslim populations. However, the religious and political confrontation between the two empires in border territories did not diminish in importance; military operations in the region were often necessary to showcase imperial power and strengthen their claims of legitimacy. Furthermore, during this period, the Safavid state was highly militarized, and warfare was considered a natural and noble way of life for the Qizilbash warriors who fulfilled these duties. It was in warfare that they could demonstrate their courage, sacrifices, and honor. War also provided opportunities for enrichment and acquiring vast territories. Tahmasp appointed his commanders who participated in these campaigns to key state positions, and they, in turn, distributed the spoils of war among their supporters. All these factors served as strong motivations for expansion into the Caucasus, and the Safavid high command believed that these benefits outweighed the direct confrontation risk with the Ottomans in the region.

=== First march ===
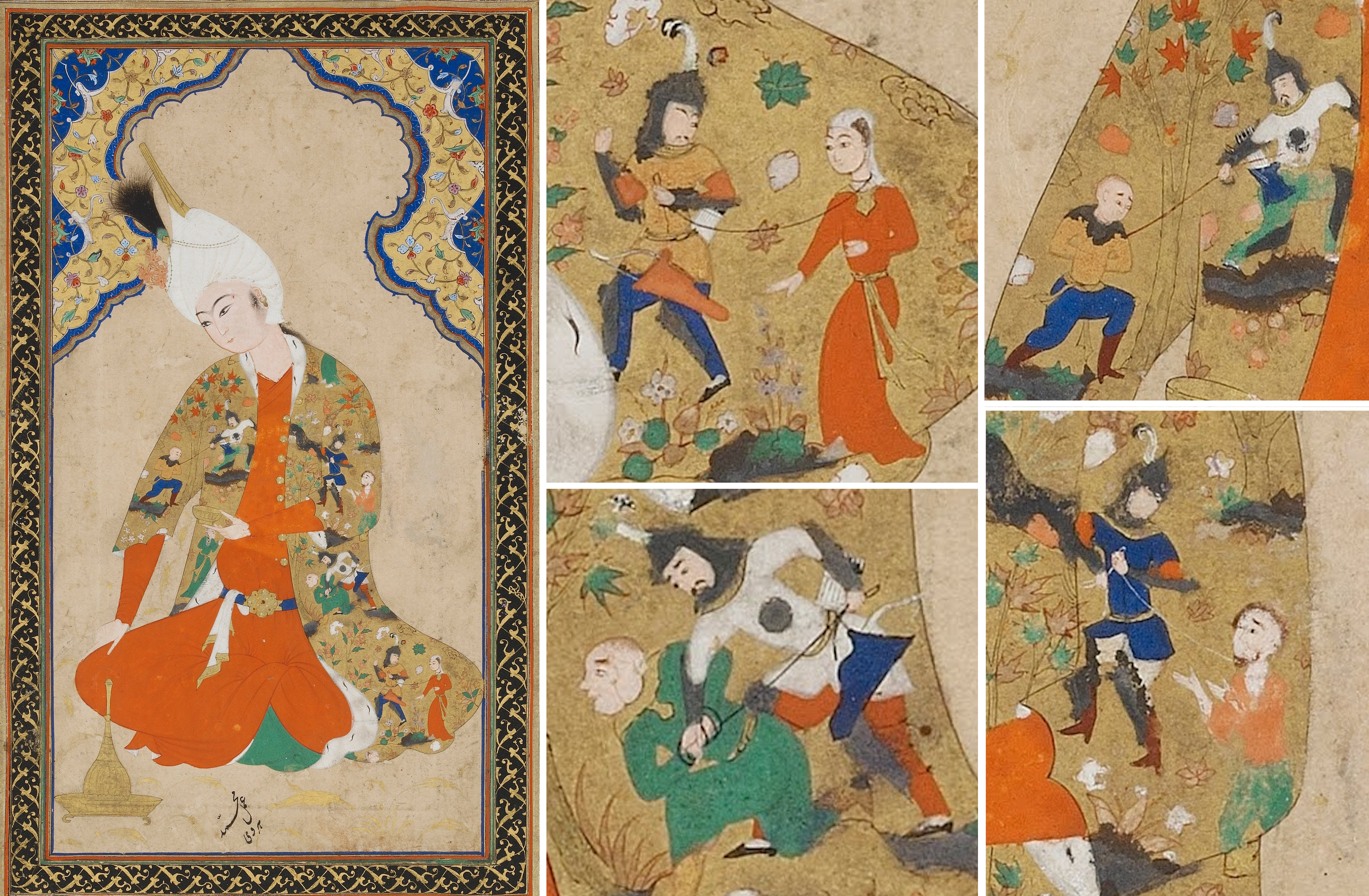
Young prince, wearing a coat with scenes of warriors taking both male and female Georgian prisoners. Painted by Muhammad Haravi, "art of the court of Shah Tahmasp", mid-16th century.

Shah Tahmasp's first campaign into Georgian territory occurred in 1541 when he was 27 years old. By this time, he had consolidated all his power and placed his trusted individuals from the Qizilbash elite in positions of authority throughout the provinces. At the beginning of this campaign, internal civil war had ceased, stability had been established on the eastern borders through victories over the Uzbeks in 1539, and it had been six years since the conclusion of Süleyman's campaign from 1533 to 1535. Kartli and Kakheti kingdoms bore the brunt of Safavid incursions during Tahmasp's reign (and later during the reign of his grandson, Abbas I). On the other hand, the Principality of Samtskhe, taking advantage of its geographical distance to avoid the risks of direct military confrontation and maintain its independence, engaged in political dialogue with the Safavids. The Kingdom of Kartli, ruled by the Bagrationi dynasty, had a powerful ruler named King Luarsab I, who held sway over several autonomous states like Sabaratiano, Saamilaxvaro, and Satsitsiano. He was a staunch adversary of Shah Tahmasp during this period and vigorously resisted the Safavids' attempts to establish dominance in Kartli and neighboring regions.

The Safavid sources of the period do not distinguish between the Georgian kingdoms; in these sources, the general designation for the region is the term "Georgia." However, by noting rulers or well-known cities (such as Qori or Tbilisi), one can determine which specific kingdom is being referred to. According to these sources, the primary motive for initiating these campaigns was nothing other than the "holy war" (jihad) against the infidels. Hasan-bey Rumlu, in his chronicle, writes: "In defense of the faith and the victory of Shah Islam and the strengthening of the Prophet's religion, fearless armies marched to Georgia." On the other hand, Armenian chronicler Zakaria Kanakertsi mentions that the Georgians were the cause of the initial invasion, as they "attacked and plundered any Iranian who came to Tbilisi." In 1541, Qizilbash forces advanced from Karabakh to Tbilisi, the capital of Kartli under the rule of King Luarsab. Just two years prior to the Safavid invasion, Michel Membray, the Venetian envoy who passed through Georgia, wrote:

According to his (King Luarsab's) nobles, he has approximately 5,000 cavalrymen called aznavurs... The mentioned city of Tbilisi is very large, but as a result of numerous wars, a large part of it has been destroyed. The aforementioned King Luarsab pays an annual tribute of 1,000 ducats to Shah Tahmasp.

According to Membray's information, the Kingdom of Kakheti had paid tribute to the Safavid Empire at least until 1538. Hasan bey Rumlu, who participated in Shah Tahmasp's first campaign to Georgia, provides more detailed information compared to other available sources. According to his writings, the Qizilbash army reached the city of Tbilisi at night and immediately launched an attack on the city. One of Luarsab's commanders, Kalbad-i Gurji, was in Tbilisi with his fighters and intended to resist. Eventually, he was defeated, and the city was captured by the Qizilbash. The captured city was plundered, and the people were taken as captives. Another Georgian commander, Habs Bartis, fled to the fortress of Habs Bartis but was eventually defeated. Those who converted to Islam, including Kalbad, survived, while those who did not immediately were executed. The Qizilbash army began marching along the banks of the Kura River to capture Luarsab and his people. The army quickly returned to Tabriz with victories and numerous captives. A notable feature of these campaigns was the siege of fortresses in Georgian principalities. In fact, the success of each round of military attacks depended on the capture of the chain of fortresses controlling the territory. The stone fortress was a symbol of the military aristocracy of Georgia—it was the center of their political and administrative apparatus and the basis of their military power in the region. In other words, to dominate the region, it was necessary to first control the central fortress of that region. During these campaigns, the fortress was the strongest, most threatening, and dominant structure that Safavid forces encountered in Georgian villages. Capturing the fortress was essential to break the power of Georgian armed forces in any specific area and played a significant role in these campaigns.

Safavids' successful campaign in 1541 was indeed significant. Despite facing numerous challenges in battles against the superior Ottoman army, the rise in morale of the Qizilbash army contributed to this outcome. Correspondingly, this victory brought great personal benefits to Shah Tahmasp himself, as it reflected the increasing power and influence of his armed forces. During this period, Shah Tahmasp needed military success to enhance his personal influence and strengthen central authority. Ultimately, the success achieved in this campaign led to an increase in loyalty of the Qizilbash commanders to their Shahs and convinced them of his strong leadership. Undoubtedly, this military victory also resulted in political gains for Shah Tahmasp. Therefore, despite the campaign not achieving total victory, Shah Tahmasp had to be content with its outcomes.

=== Second march ===
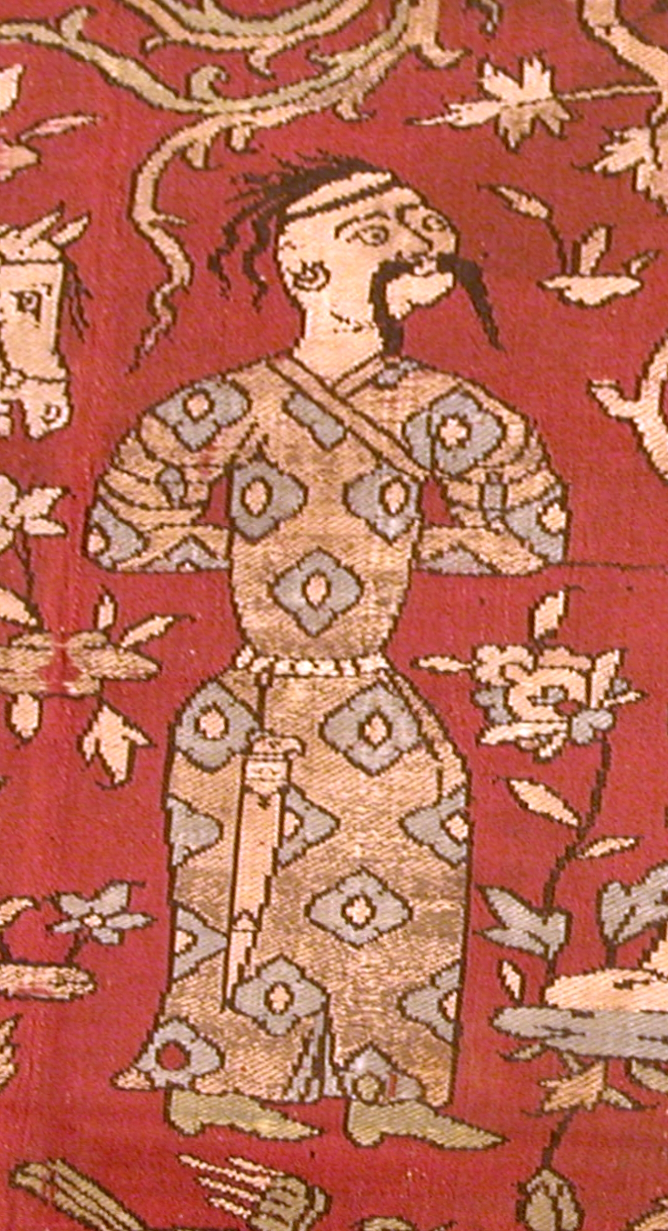
Georgian captive, following the four Safavid military campaigns between 1540 and 1553. Persian tapestry of the mid-16th century.

In the winter of 1547, six years later, Shah Tahmasp launched a new campaign against the Kingdom of Kartli. Apparently, the decision was influenced by the rebellion of Shah Tahmasp's younger brother, Alqas Mirza, and his participation in the third Ottoman campaign. News of Alqas Mirza's rebellion reached Shah Tahmasp while he was in Qazvin in 1546. The Shah's envoy, Ali Agha Qapichibashi, was sent to persuade him, but his efforts were unsuccessful. Subsequently, Shah Tahmasp decided to march to Shirvan with his army. Upon hearing of the Shah's approach, Alqas Mirza felt threatened and sent his mother and son, Ahmed Mirza, to the Shah's court seeking forgiveness. The Shah accepted the offer and dispatched his senior officials, Shahqulu Khalifeh Mohuradari, Sevindik Bey Qorchubashi, and Badr Khan Ustajlu, to arrange for Alqas Mirza to swear an oath on the Quran that he would not rebel again. In return for his agreement, Alqas Mirza pledged to pay a thousand tumans in tribute annually, send a thousand soldiers in times of war, and remain loyal until death. Despite not being entirely satisfied with these developments, Shah Tahmasp continued his march northward and arrived in Tabriz from Sahand.

It turned out that Alqas Mirza's agreement to submit was merely a tactical maneuver to buy time. Shortly after swearing his oath, he reneged on it, minted coins in his own name, and began delivering sermons. This indicated that he was seeking to ascertain whether the Ottoman Sultan would indeed come to his aid. Subsequently, Alqas Mirza traveled to Shamakhi, then to Derbent. After crossing the Samur River, his forces clashed with the Qizilbash forces under the command of Shahverdi Sultan Ziyadoghlu Qajar, Muhammad Bey Turkman, Suleyman Bey Chalabi, and Muhammad Bey Shirbext's son Talish, resulting in their defeat. Their next encounter was with the Qizilbash army led by Shahqulu Khalifeh, and again they were defeated. Realizing that he could not defeat the Qizilbash, Alqas Mirza fled the battlefield and sought refuge in Ottoman territories, deciding to seek asylum with Sultan Suleyman.

Since Alqas Mirza showed the initial signs of submission, the main army of the Qizilbash was stationed in the city of Tabriz and was fully prepared for battle. After Alqas declared his submission and swore to pay taxes and send troops, a decision was made to attack Kaxetiya with the army already in readiness in Tabriz. However, when Shah Tahmasib received news that Alqas Mirza had rebelled again, he was already advancing rapidly towards Georgia, as recorded in his memoirs. Thus, it appears that Shah Tahmasib made the decision to march into Georgia regardless of Alqas's forgiveness, indicating his rebellion once again. Shah Tahmasib reached Agsheher with his army in the winter of 1547. A fierce battle ensued, resulting in the defeat of the Georgian forces and the devastation of the region. The army then set off from Agsheher towards Tabdiye, where Levend-bek and his counterpart Bash Achıq expressed their loyalty, reaching the Shah's camp. The Shah received them warmly and bestowed upon them honorary garments. They quickly returned to their estates. Meanwhile, the army continued its march towards Ganja, setting up a temporary camp near Bulaq.

=== Third march ===
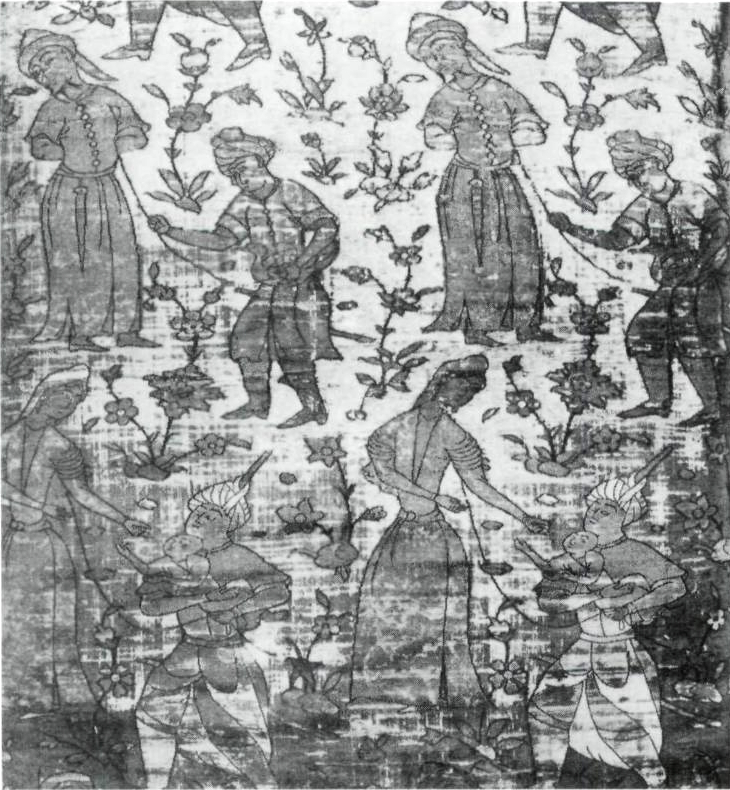
Mid-16th century Safavid textile, with motif of Georgian prisoners

The third march into southern Georgia took place in 1551. The Qizilbash army, commanded by Bedr Khan Ustajlu, Shahqulu Ustajlu, and Shahqulu Khalife Mohrdar, gathered in Sheki with the assistance of Georgian forces under the command of Levant Bey, and defeated its ruler, Dervish Mehmed Khan. As the main part of the army camped in Sheki, one of the Georgian rulers, Keikhosrow, appealed to Tahmasp for help against Luarsab, as Luarsab and Vakhusa Guji had taken over part of his lands. Meanwhile, the Ottoman army, under the command of Iskender Pasha, entered the western region of present-day Georgia. It is very likely that to prevent the Georgian ruler Luarsab from forming an alliance with the Ottoman army, the Qizilbash forces, under the command of Bedr Khan Ustajlu, Ali Sultan Tekeli, and Shahverdi Khan Ziyadoghlu (who played a decisive role in this march), marched towards Luarsab's main fortress located in Kartli. Although they captured Malinkub (also mentioned as Mankub Darfar or Manaskub Darqard in sources), Darzbad, and an unnamed monastery, they could not capture Luarsab's main forces, and they managed to escape and save their lives. The Qizilbash forces looted the captured territories and killed 20 of the clergy in the monastery.

In the autumn of 1551, the Qizilbash commanders launched another march into the interior of Kakheti to eliminate Luarsab's main army. However, they could not achieve an absolute victory against Luarsab's small but well-organized army, as Luarsab once again evaded decisive combat. Nevertheless, the Qizilbash obtained significant plunder and captives, raiding the surrounding regions, including Barat Ali. With the onset of winter, the Safavid army withdrew to Karabakh. Safavid sources explicitly state that during these raids, the region was devastated, and a large portion of the local population fell victim to plunder, confirming the extremely harsh nature of this campaign. Hasan Bey Rumlu also provided detailed information about the clashes. Politically, the Safavids achieved several important objectives with this campaign. Shah Tahmasp gained a new vassal ruler like Keikhosrow. Additionally, Keikhosrow assisted Shah Tahmasp in capturing Tumak Castle, Aghsheher, and the surrounding areas. Renowned Georgian nobles Vakhus Guji and his ally, the ruler of the territories held by Keikhosrow, Sharmazanoghlu, were captured and executed, and their lands were divided. However, they could not capture Luarsab, the main rival commander of the Georgian army. Therefore, punitive measures against the local population were implemented by the Qizilbash army.

=== Fourth march ===
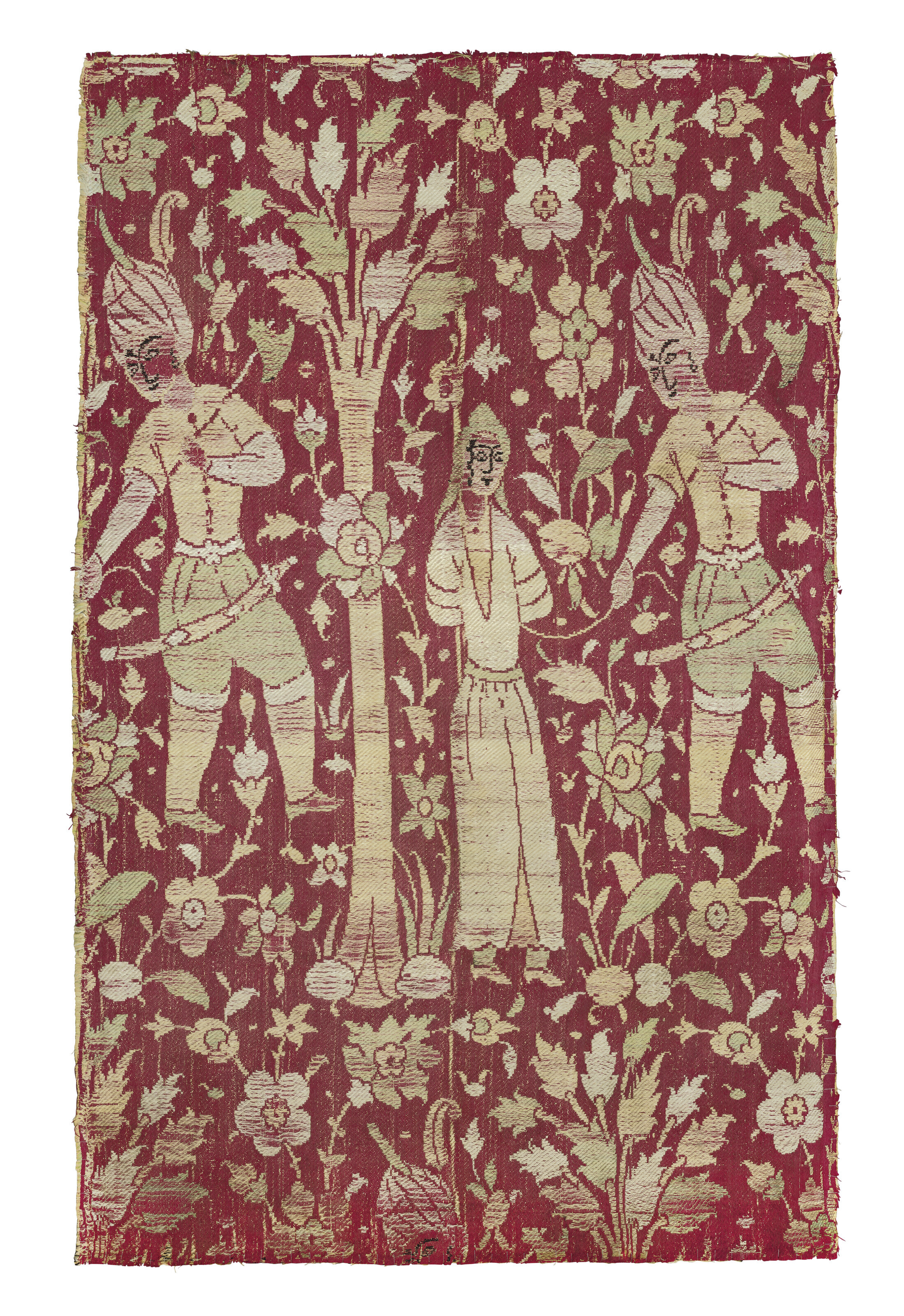
Silk lampas panel with Safavid warrior holding a female captive. Thought to commemorate the raid against the city of Kartlia in 1553. Iran, second half 16th century.

During the reign of Sultan Suleiman, immediately after the last Ottoman campaign, which covered the years 1553–1554, the Qizilbash army immediately embarked on a new march towards Kartli. Like the previous Ottoman incursions, this Ottoman march resulted in significant losses for both sides without giving either side any advantage. Therefore, peace negotiations commenced immediately after the conclusion of the march, culminating in the Treaty of Amasya in 1555. Writing about these events seventy years later and having the opportunity to evaluate them retrospectively, Iskender Bey Munshi considered the division of the Georgian kingdoms between the Ottomans and Safavids as part of the Treaty of Amasya. According to him, both sides agreed that Samtskhe, Kartli, and Kakheti would remain under Safavid jurisdiction, while the Ottomans would control Basiani, Dadian, and Kuriyana (Imretia, Mingrelia, and Guria).

Meanwhile, King Luarsab I of Kartli utilized the Safavid-Ottoman rivalry once again to assert greater autonomy. In response to the threat posed by the Ottomans, Shah Tahmasp, reinforced by his trusted commander Shahverdi Sultan Ziyadoghlu Qajar, invaded Luarsab's territory. Luarsab employed the same battle tactics that Shah Tahmasp had used against the Ottoman army, avoiding direct confrontation. However, the better military strategy of the Qizilbash army enabled them to defeat Luarsab and gradually advance towards his capital. As a result, they captured the city of Qori in 1554. Although the fortresses of Mezrut, Parsatan, and Aydin were captured during the battles, Aydin fortress, which was then the residence of Luarsab's mother, offered stubborn resistance. The most intense battle of this campaign occurred during the siege of Aydin fortress, where many of Luarsab's warriors fiercely resisted the attacks of the Qizilbash. Eventually, breaches were made in the fortress walls, and the defenders' resistance was overcome. The Safavid forces slew many and took numerous prisoners, including Luarsab's mother, as captives. Over the following weeks, they gained significant spoils, wealth, and new slaves, crushing other pockets of resistance in the region. Safavid sources do not mention the fate of the king's mother afterward. According to Safavid chronicles, during this campaign, the Safavid army took more than 30,000 Georgian captives, relocating them to Safavid territory. It is reported that the Qizilbash army spent the winter near Qori and moved to Karabakh in January. In February, the Shah and his army moved southward to Ganja, where the governor, Shahverdi Sultan Ziyadoghlu Qajar, hosted feasts and festivities in honor of the successful campaign for eight days. Subsequently, the Shah's army proceeded to the province of Barda.

In 1557, after reclaiming Qori, Luarsab gathered an effective army and expelled the Safavid garrison from the region. Upon hearing this news, the Beylerbeyi of Karabakh, Shahverdi Sultan Ziyadoghlu, marched to put an end to Luarsab's efforts once and for all. However, his cavalry was ambushed on the way. While the Qizilbash army suffered heavy losses and was forced to retreat, one of the commanders in Shahverdi Khan's ranks, Mehmed Bey Chepni, managed to break through Luarsab's ranks and engage him in combat, ultimately killing him. Taking advantage of the chaos, Mehmed Bey Chepni seized Luarsab's horse and escaped from there. The Qizilbash fighter who succeeded in killing Luarsab was subsequently slain by Luarsab's warriors. Luarsab's son, Simon I, succeeded him, continuing the struggle against the Qizilbash.

Five years later, Simon entered into a military alliance with Levan, the king of Kartli, which was further solidified by Simon's marriage to Levan's daughter, Nestan Darejan. Simon's aim was to gather a large army and recapture Tbilisi from the Safavids. Joining the coalition were Levan's son, George, and many other influential provincial lords. According to a contemporary chronicle, "in a short time, so many warriors were assembled that the ancient heavens had never seen such a thing in centuries of existence."

=== Fifth march ===
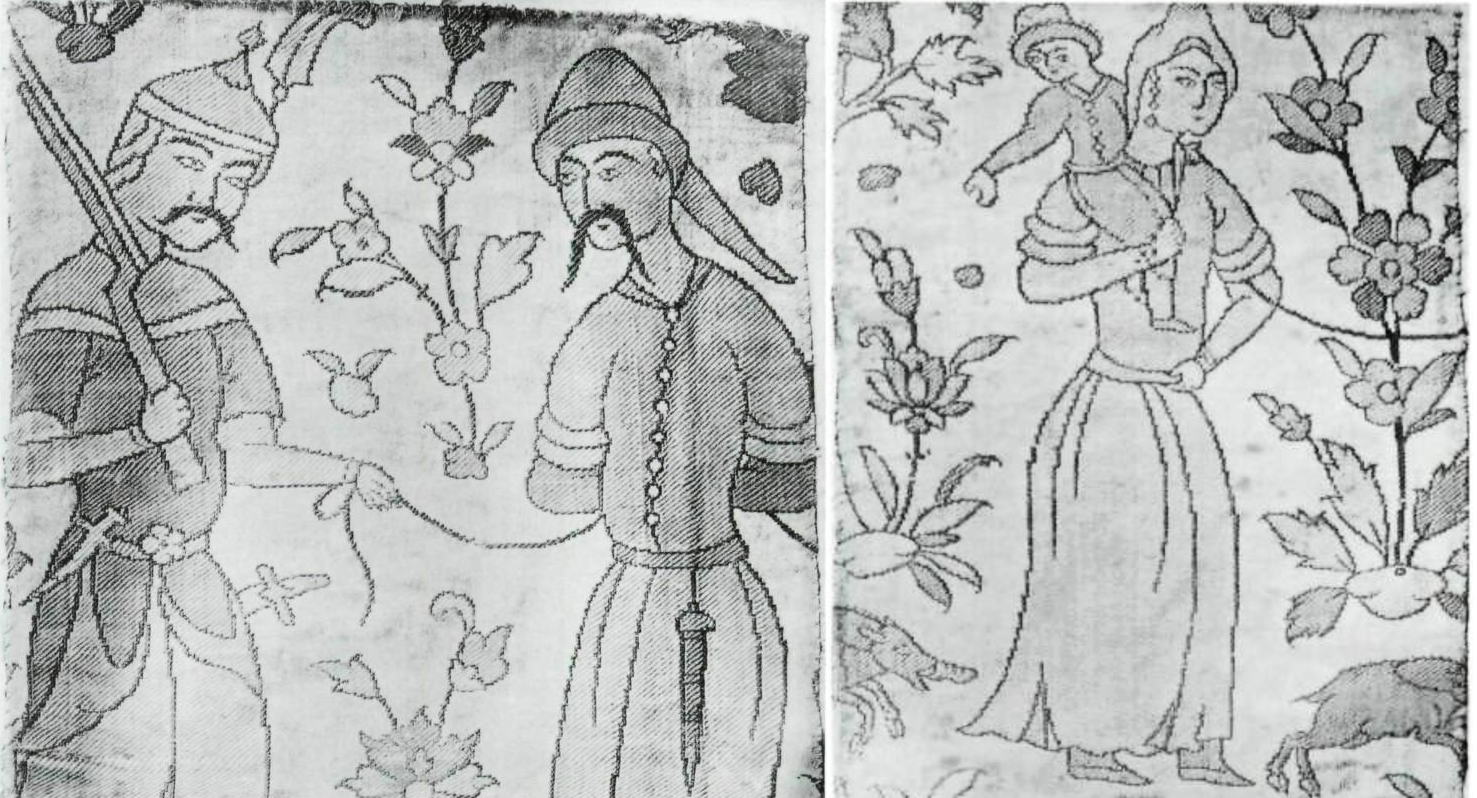
Georgian captives. Mid-16th century Safavid textile

Shah Tahmasp once again ordered Shahverdi Sultan Ziyadoglu, the ruler of Karabakh, to attack the Georgians and suppress their rebellion. Leading the Karabakh warriors, he marched from Ganja and encountered the Georgian forces on May 1, 1561. The Georgian army, armed with light weapons, was not as swift as the Qizilbash cavalry. Quickly, the Georgians were defeated and fled from the battlefield. The defeated troops of Kartli retreated northward to the city of Gori. Levan's son, George, along with a thousand warriors, was mercilessly slain. The consequences of this event were recorded in one of Kartli's palace chronicles as follows:

Upon hearing the news of his son's death, Levan's heart was engulfed in flames of sorrow, and tears of blood streamed from his eyes. All the Georgians donned black mourning attire.

The defeat in this battle had long-lasting consequences. It shattered hopes of achieving political and military unity under the general banner of Kakheti. Not only did it undermine the aspirations for independence among the Kakhetians, but it also deeply affected the royal family of Kartli on a spiritual level. While Simon continued to stubbornly reject Safavid rule, his brother, David, fearing his ongoing civil opposition and the unstable political situation, betrayed him and defected to the Safavid side. In 1561, with the support of his followers, he came to the Safavid court in Qazvin and pledged allegiance to Shah Tahmasp. He embraced Islam and was thereafter recognized as Daud Khan. Shah Tahmasp acknowledged him as the ruler of Tbilisi and rewarded him with limited authority. According to the accounts of Iskandar Bey Munshi, under the rule of the Safavid Shah, he could rule, and "from this time onward, he served as one of the commanders of the Tbilisi fortress among the Qizilbash emirs, and worked as an advisor and mentor to Khan David".

=== Sixth march ===
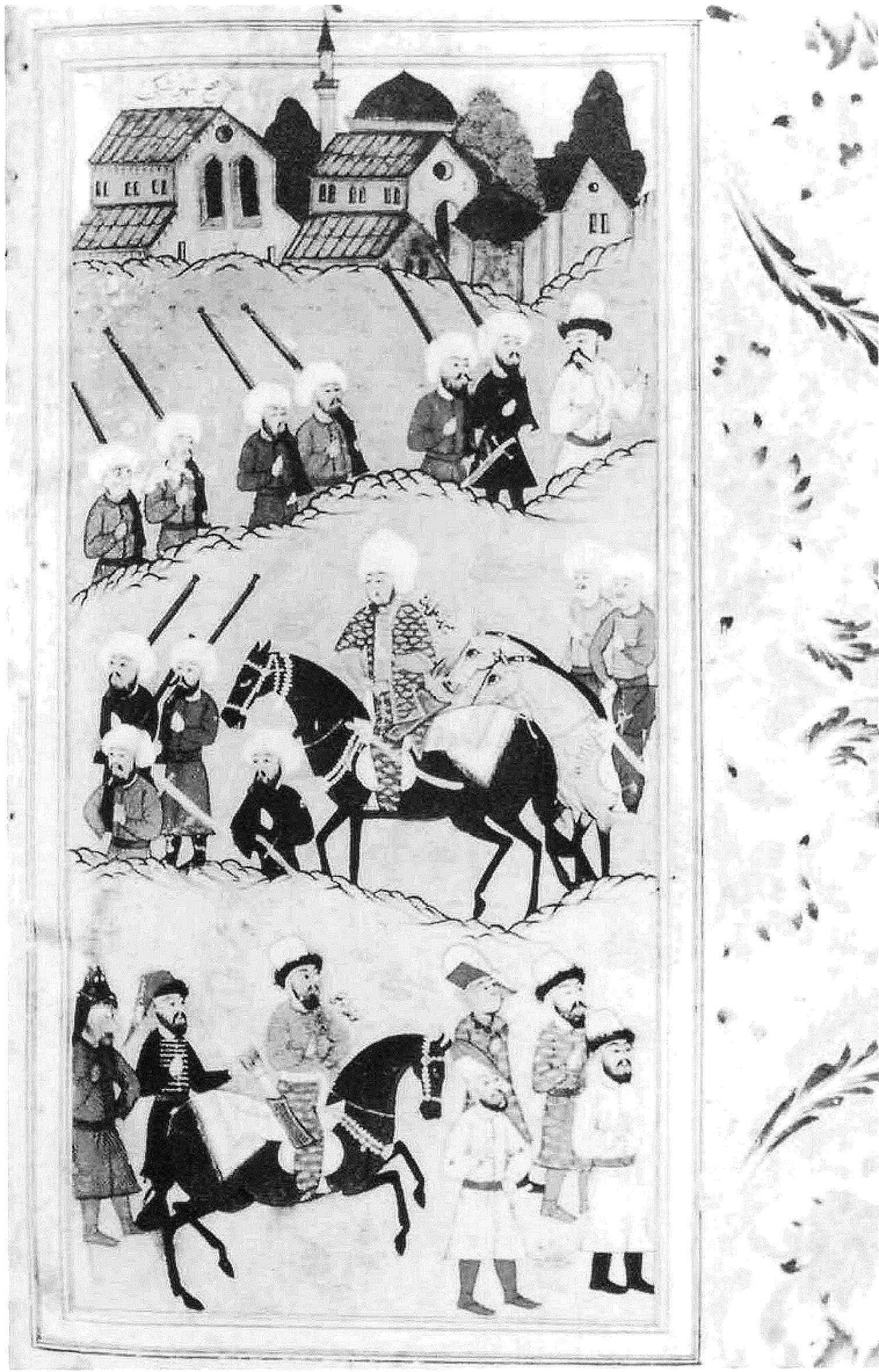
Ottoman troops under Lala Mustafa Pasha, and Alexander II of Kakheti with his Georgian troops (bottom) at the conquest of the conquest of Sheki in Shirvan from the Safavids on 10 September 1578. Nusretname, Topkapi, H.1365

In 1566, Simon I attempted to seize Tbilisi from his brother and almost succeeded, crushing a small Safavid garrison under the command of Ibrahim Khalifa Karamanly, who had hastily attacked Simon's forces. It seems that the main reason for this was the Georgian contingent's refusal to obey Daud Khan's order to provide support to the Safavids. However, the citadel of Tbilisi proved impregnable to Simon's forces, and after a few days they lifted the siege and retreated. This small defeat alarmed the Safavid court with Simon's growing power. The following year, Shah Tahmasp I instructed Daud Khan to deal with his defiant brother Simon once and for all. In order to provide the necessary military support, he sent Shamkhal-bek Cherkes, Ibrahim-bek Alpaut and Aligulu-bek Qajar to his aid. In the bloody battle that soon followed, the Safavid army captured Simon on the battlefield and brought him to the court at Qazvin. He was held as a prisoner in the famous fortress of Kahkaha until 1578, when he was equipped and sent back to fight the advancing Ottoman armies.

== Result ==
Kartli and Kakheti kingdoms were subjected to continuous incursions for a long time. With the Amasya peace treaty, the recognition by the Ottoman Empire of these territories within the sphere of influence of the Safavid Empire was formalized. The constant raids by Qizilbash bands in the region replaced Georgian kings with their own men, deposing one king and installing another, and frequently taking captives. Additionally, the rugged terrain of Georgia, characterized by dense forests and mountains, hindered the eradication of resistance centers in the region.

== Sources ==
- Atıl, Esin (1978). The brush of the masters, drawings from Iran and India. Washington : Freer Gallery of Art, Smithsonian Institution.
- Smithsonian (2025b). "Young Prince". asia.si.edu.

== Bibliography ==
- Khafipour, Hani (2013). The Foundations of Safavid State: fealty, patronage, and ideals of authority (1501-1576). Chicago: The University of Chicago.
