= Nestan-Darejan of Kakheti, Queen of Kartli =

Queen of Kartli (1556–1569, 1578–1600)

Darejan of Kartli

Queen consort of Kartli
- Tenure: 1556–1569; 1578–1600
- Spouse: Simon I of Kartli
- Issue Among others: George X
- Dynasty: Bagrationi dynasty
- Father: Levan of Kakheti
- Mother: Daughter of Shamkhal Kara-Musel
- Religion: Georgian Orthodox Church
- Khelrtva

Nestan-Darejan (Georgian: ნესტან-დარეჯანი; fl. 1556–1612) was Queen consort of Kartli, a kingdom in eastern Georgia, as the wife of King Simon I, whom she married in 1559. Nestan-Darejan was a daughter of King Levan of Kakheti and a half-sister of Levan's successor to the throne of Kingdom of Kakheti, Alexander II. Her husband spent nearly five decades fighting the Safavid Iranian and Ottoman encroachments on his kingdom, twice losing his throne and personal freedom. Nestan-Darejan suffered further, being humiliated by his half-brother, the king of Kakheti, who capitalized on Simon's difficulties to attack and loot Kartli. After Simon had been sent a prisoner to Iran in 1569, Nestan-Darejan's estates had been pillaged by Prince Bardzim Amilakhori, Alexander's father-in-law; and in 1580, following Simon's return to Kartli and his defeat by Alexander at Dighomi, the latter carried off after the battle his half-sister's drawers on the point of a lance. Nestan-Darejan outlived her husband and died sometime after 1612, having mothered six children, including Simon's successor to the throne of Kartli, George X.

== Marriage ==
Nestan-Darejan was born of Levan of Kakheti's second marriage to a daughter of the shamkhal of Tarki, whom the king married in 1529 after he divorced his first wife, Tinatin Gurieli. Nestan-Darejan married Simon I of Kartli in 1559. This union was one of the first interdynastic marriages between the Kartlian and Kakhetian branches of the Bagrationi dynasty, holding sway over the two breakaway successors of the once united Kingdom of Georgia. The union was followed by a pact between the two monarchies, one aim being to evict the Iranian garrison from Tbilisi, the capital of Kartli. Levan of Kakheti eventually hung back, but allowed his son and heir, Prince George, to join Simon's army. The Georgians lost the ensuing confrontation and George was killed on the battlefield.

== Persecution ==
After the Iranian army captured Simon in battle and sent for imprisonment at Alamut in 1569, Queen Nestan-Darejan found herself in a hostile environment in Kartli. The main threats to her security came from her half-brother Alexander II, a disowned son of Levan, on whose death he succeeded as king of Kakheti, having defeated and massacred his half-brothers. Out of favor with the Safavid protégé David XI—Simon's Islamized brother and a rival ruler at Tbilisi, who was married to Alexander's relative—the queen became a target of harassment by Prince Bardzim Amilakhvari, Alexander II's father-in-law, who, joined by the duke of Ksani, raided and completely looted her estate.

== Return to power ==
The invasion of the Ottoman army of the Georgian lands led by Lala Mustafa Pasha and the quick collapse of Daud Khan's regime in 1578 compelled the Iranian government to release Simon as the only ruler capable to mount resistance to the Ottoman advance. Back to his homeland, Simon had his domestic adversaries, including Prince Amilakhori, arrested. Amilakhori and the duke of Ksani pleaded for mercy and approached Nestan-Darejan, who persuaded her husband to issue amnesty for them, having reclaimed, in return, what has been lost to these noblemen and, further, Akhalgori and Mejuda from the duke and Kaspi and Karbi from Amilakhori.

== Further misfortunes ==
Alexander of Kakheti's enmity to Simon remained undiminished owing to his hatred of his half-sister. In 1580 the Kakhetian army surprised Simon, staying without troops at Dighomi, and put him to flight. Alexander could not get at Simon, but he, the Georgian chronicle says, dishonored Nestan-Darejan and, "like a brigand", rode off bearing his half-sister's drawers high upon a lance. Simon vowed revenge and assaulted Alexander's army at Chotori, putting the Kakhetians to rout and Alexander to flight.

After years of heavy fighting, Simon's turbulent reign ended in 1599, when he was captured by the Ottoman army and sent in prison to Constantinople. His son, George X, succeeded him. Nestan-Darejan outlived both her son, who died in 1606, and her husband, who died in captivity in 1611. His remains were brought by the Georgian merchant Diakvnishvili from Constantinople to Nestan-Darejan and interred at the Svetitskhoveli Cathedral. Nestan-Darejan's subsequent life is obscure. She lived on to see the accession to the throne of her young grandson, Luarsab II, subsequently a Christian martyr and saint of the Georgian Orthodox Church, and died sometime after 1612.

== Children ==
Simon and Nestan-Darejan had six children, four sons and two daughters:

- George X (1560–1606), King of Kartli (r. 1600–1606).
- Prince Luarsab (fl. 1561–1589), who was taken as a hostage to Iran in 1582.
- Princess Helen (fl. 1583–1609), who married Manuchar II Jaqeli, Atabag of Samtskhe.
- Prince Alexander (fl. 1561–1589).
- Prince Vakhtang (fl. 1600). Prince Vakhushti of Kartli identified him as the father of Prince Luarsab of Kartli (died 1652), a genealogy later accepted by Cyril Toumanoff.
- Princess Fahrijan-Begum (fl. 1582), who married Hamza Mirza, son of Mohammad Khodabanda.

== Ancestry ==
Ancestors of Nestan-Darejan of Kakheti, Queen of Kartli

16. George VIII
8. Alexander I of Kakheti
17. Nestan-Darejan N.
4. George II of Kakheti
9. Nestan-Darejan N.
2. Levan of Kakheti
10. Garsevan Cholokashvili
5. Ana Cholokashvili
1. Nestan-Darejan
6. Kamal Kara-Musel of Tarku
3. N. of Tarku

== Notes ==
Preceded by Tamar of Imereti	Queen consort of Kartli; 1556–1569	Succeeded by Elene of Kakheti or a princess of Tarki
Preceded by Elene of Kakheti or a princess of Tarki	Queen consort of Kartli; 1578–1599	Succeeded by Mariam Dadiani
