= Dzegvi =

Village in Mtskheta-Mtianeti, Georgia

Dzegvi ძეგვი
- Village
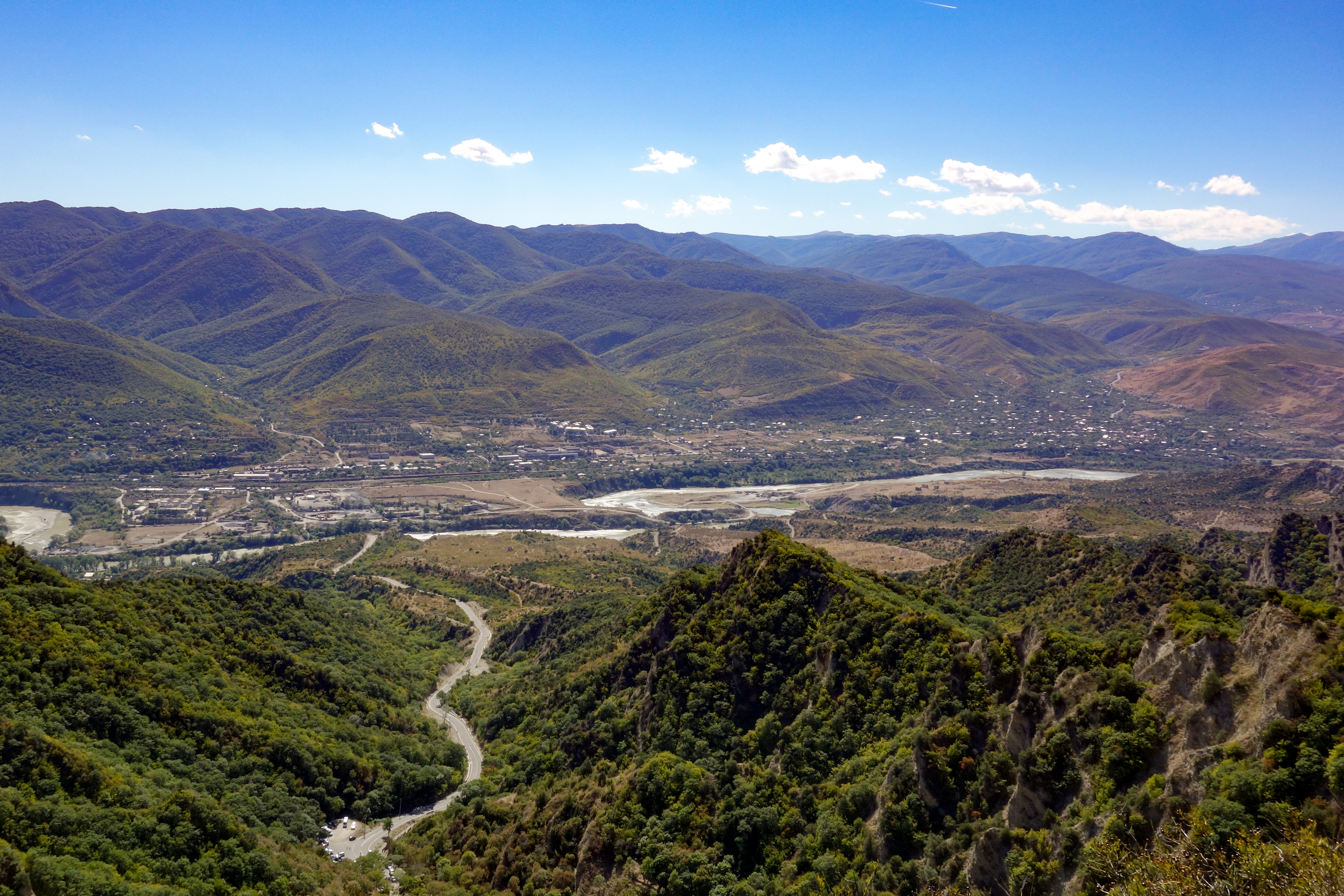

- Location in Georgia
- Coordinates: 41°50′47″N 44°35′56″E
- Country: Georgia
- Region: Mtskheta-Mtianeti
- Municipality: Mtskheta
- Elevation: 560 m (1,840 ft)

Population (2014)
  - Total: 2,840
- Time zone: UTC+4

Dzegvi (Georgian: ძეგვი) is a village in eastern Georgia, in Mtskheta Municipality, Mtskheta-Mtianeti region. It is situated on the right bank of the Mtkvari River, at an elevation of 560 metres above sea level. The village lies 9 kilometres from Mtskheta and 2 kilometres from Dzegvi railway station.

As of the 2014 census, Dzegvi had a population of 2,840. The population was overwhelmingly ethnic Georgian, with small Armenian and Russian minorities.

== History ==
Dzegvi is a historic settlement located at the foot of the northern slope of the Trialeti Range. Archaeological material indicates that the area was already inhabited in antiquity.

Important roads passed through Dzegvi, linking Shida Kartli with Kvemo Kartli and Zemo Kartli, while also connecting the lowlands with the mountainous regions. A customs post existed in Dzegvi from ancient times and retained its importance during the Middle Ages.

In the 12th century, Dzegvi was a village belonging to the Catholicos and owed certain dues for the benefit of Svetitskhoveli. The community of Dzegvi, referred to in historical sources as the “collective Dzegveli”, was subject to the feudal authority of Svetitskhoveli as a whole rather than through individual peasant households. The Dzegveli were noted for providing one of the best military detachments under the banner of the Catholicos. According to a 1720 document issued under Vakhtang VI, in the first half of the 18th century Dzegvi supplied 50 well-armed musketeers, two-thirds of whom were cavalry.

In 1561, during the campaigns of King Simon of Kartli against the Qizilbash, forces from Kakheti under Prince George, son of King Levan of Kakheti, joined the Kartlian army. The united host encamped at Tsikhedidi. Owing to negligence by guards stationed near Mukhatgverdi, the enemy was able to launch a surprise attack on the Georgian camp. Although the Georgians resisted bravely and inflicted significant losses, the death of Prince George caused the Kakhetian forces to abandon the battle, and the engagement ended in favor of the Qizilbash. Simon himself escaped to Gori, and the liberation of Tbilisi was not achieved.

The inhabitants of Dzegvi also resisted the arbitrary demands of monastic administrators and local officials. In the second half of the 17th century, they refused to pay the kulukhi tax according to an enlarged unit known as the “large jar” and instead demanded the use of the “twelve-unit jar”. They also requested relief from grain and bread dues imposed for the benefit of monastery officials. The Catholicos accepted these demands and altered the tax arrangement accordingly.

== Demographics ==
According to the 2014 census, Dzegvi had a population of 2,840.

Census year	Population
2002	2,911
2014	2,840

The ethnic composition recorded in 2014 was:

- Georgians – 99.0%
- Armenians – 0.4%
- Russians – 0.2%

== Historical monuments ==
Dzegvi preserves several monuments of medieval Georgian architecture. Among the most notable is a single-nave hall church faced externally with finely cut stone slabs. Its doors and windows are decorated with profiled stone frames.

In the center of the village stands a round tower built of river stone laid in straight rows. It served both defensive and residential purposes. In the upper part of the tower is a wide arched niche constructed in brick, with a window opening set into it.

Several small hall churches also stand in the vicinity of the village, including the 10th-century Bodzis Sakhdari, whose interior preserves fragments of 11th- and 12th-century wall paintings.

== Sources ==
- Georgian Soviet Encyclopedia, vol. 11, Tbilisi, 1987, p. 266.
- Kakhadze, K. Description of the Historical and Cultural Monuments of Georgia, vol. 5, Tbilisi, 1990, p. 333.
