= Nicholas V of Georgia =

Nicholas V
- His Holiness and Beatitude, the Catholicos-Patriarch of All Georgia
- Church: Georgian Orthodox Church

Personal details
- Born: Nikoloz Bagrationi; 1529
- Died: 1591 (aged 61–62)
- Denomination: Eastern Orthodox Church
- Parents: Levan of Kakheti and Tinatin Gurieli
- Occupation: Catholicos-Patriarch
- Profession: Theologian
- Khelrtva

St. Nicholas V, also known as Nicholas VIII (Georgian: ნიკოლოზ V/VIII, Nikoloz; c. 1529 – 1591) was the Catholicos Patriarch of Georgia from 28 February 1584 to 1591. He was born into the Bagrationi dynasty of Kakheti, a son of King Levan (r. 1520–1574). He was canonized by the Georgian Orthodox Church as the Holy Father Nicholas the Catholicos of Georgia, his feast day marked on 18 February (N.S.: 2 March).

== Biography ==
Nicholas was born as a younger son of King Levan of Kakheti either of his first marriage to the Gurian princess Tinatin or his second marriage to a daughter of the shamkhal of Tarku. Nicholas was, thus, a younger brother or half-brother of Alexander II, who won the bloody competition for the throne of Kakheti after Levan's death in 1574.

Nicholas was enthroned as the Catholicos Patriarch of Georgia on 28 February 1584, succeeding on the death of Catholicos Nicholas IV. His tenure was during the turbulent period of Georgia's history; the once flourishing medieval kingdom had been divided into several competing polities and the Georgian church had been split into the eastern and western counterparts, reflecting the country's political division, the eastern church being under the stewardship of Nicholas; his native Kakheti was threatened by the rival expansionism of the Safavid Iran and Ottoman Turkey.

Nicholas corresponded with Patriarch Job of Moscow, who died in 1607, and exchanged gifts with him. He also donated a leather-bound illuminated manuscript of the Gospels, copied in 1049, to the Metekhi church in Tbilisi. The 18th-century author Timote Gabashvili reports that there was an icon of Catholicos Nicholas in the refectory at the Iviron monastery on Mount Athos. Gabashvili also conjectured that another refectory, built at the Iviron at the behest of the Georgian prince Ashotan of Mukhrani, might have been Nicholas's death place.

Eastern Orthodox Church titles
Preceded by Nicholas IV	Catholicos-Patriarch of Georgia; 28 February 1584 – 1591	Succeeded by Dorotheus III
