= Tinatin Gurieli =

Queen of Kakheti from 1520 to 1529

Queen Tinatin
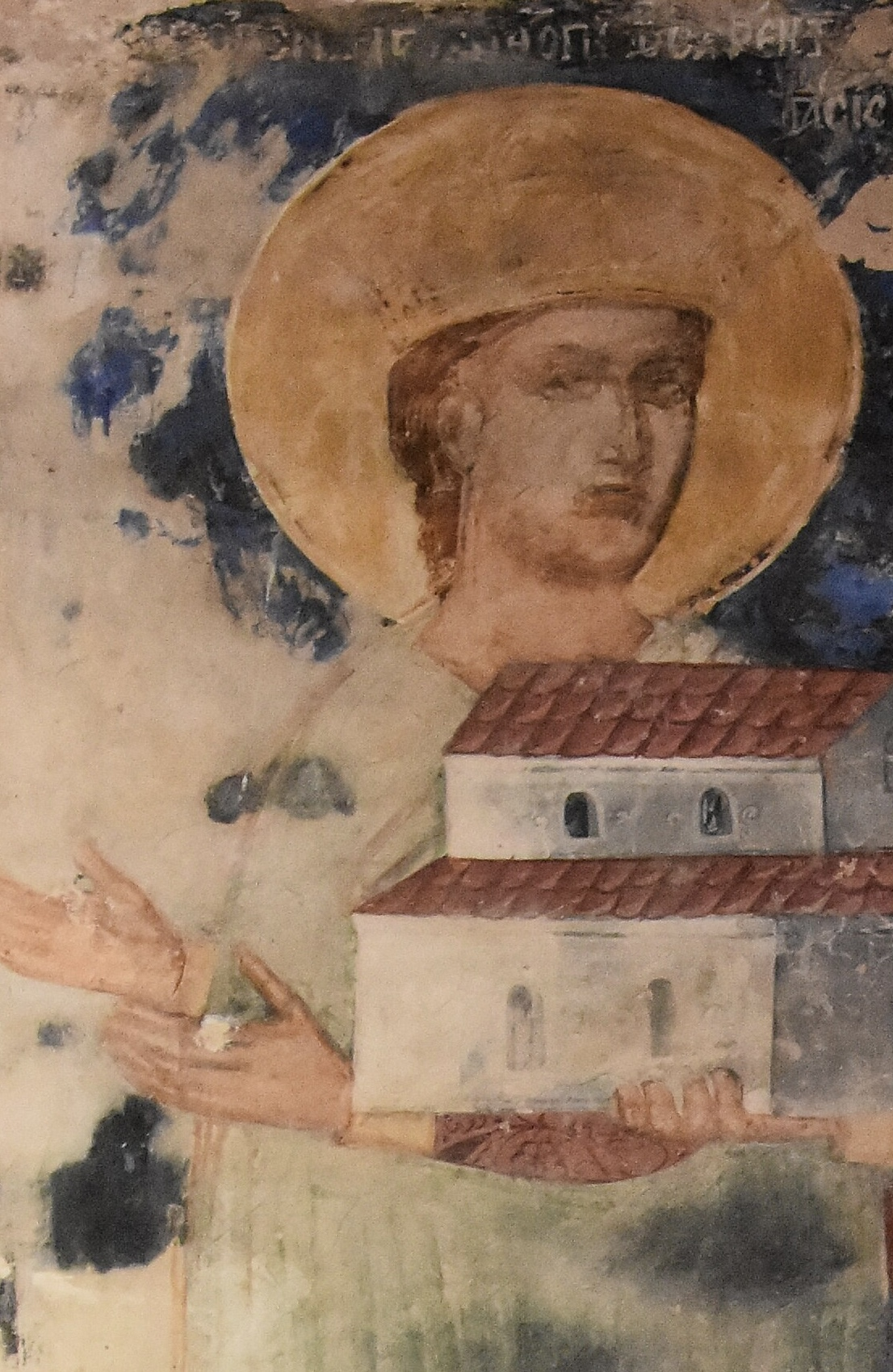
- Fresco of Queen Tinatin from the Nekresi monastery.

Queen consort of Kakheti
- Tenure: 1520–1529
- Died: 1591; Shuamta
- Burial: Shuamta monastery
- Spouse: Levan of Kakheti
- Issue: Prince George; Prince Jesse; Alexander II of Kakheti
- House: Gurieli
- Father: Mamia I Gurieli
- Religion: Georgian Orthodox Church
- Khelrtva

Tinatin Gurieli (Georgian: თინათინ გურიელი; died 1591) was Queen consort of Kakheti, a kingdom in eastern Georgia, as the first wife of King Levan. A daughter of Mamia I Gurieli, Prince of Guria, she married Levan c. 1520 and bore him at least two sons, including the future Alexander II. She divorced Levan at her own will and retired to the Shuamta monastery, which she had built in Kakheti.

== Family background and marriage ==
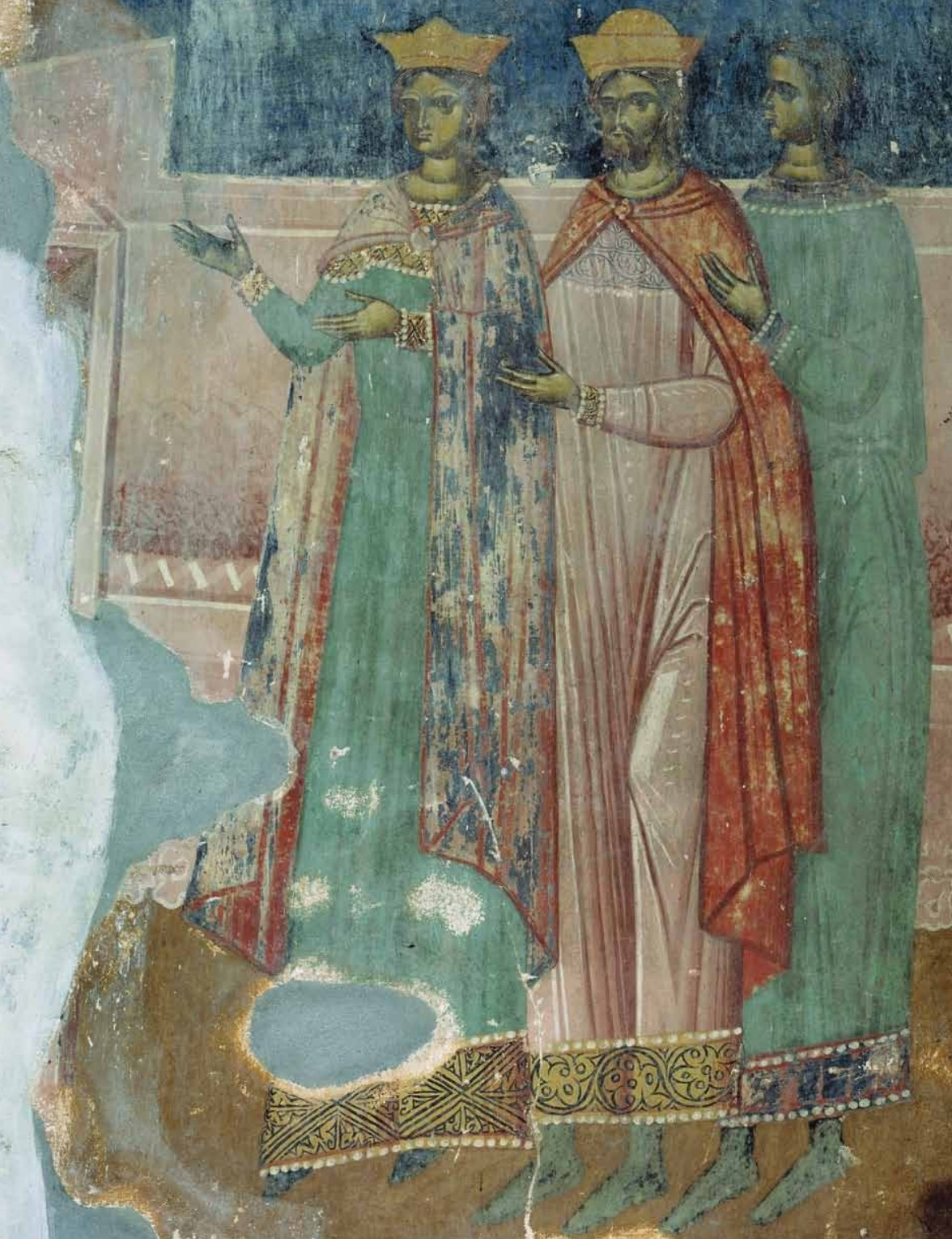
Fresco of Queen Tinatin, Levan of Kakheti and Prince Alexander, Akhali Shuamta Monastery.

Born of the Gurieli, one of the leading princely families of western Georgia with marital ties to the Trapezuntine Komnenos dynasty, Tinatin was a daughter of Mamia I, Prince of Guria. She had a brother, Rostom, subsequently Mamia's successor to the throne of Guria. Around 1520, King Levan of Kakheti, who had recently recovered his father's kingdom in eastern Georgia from the occupation of David X, King of Kartli, and was then besieged by David's army in a fortress at Maghrani, clandestinely dispatched emissaries to Mamia with the request that he send military aid and also his daughter in marriage to cement the alliance. The prince of Guria promised both. Levan succeeded in defeating David's superior force with his own army at Magharo in 1520, while Mamia victoriously advanced into Kartli. The three rulers eventually met for negotiations at Mukhrani and Mamia persuaded both David and Levan to make peace. Thereafter, Levan send his men to bring his bride from Guria.

As the 18th-century Georgian chronicler Prince Vakhushti relates, Tinatin had a dream foretelling that a noble man would take her as his wife and she would see, on her way to the groom's home, a white dogwood tree on a hill, a place where she was told to build a monastery in honor of the Mother of the God. Once brought in Kakheti, Tinatin saw the dogwood from her dream at Shuamta, vowed to build a monastery there, and proceeded to celebrate her wedding with King Levan at Gremi.

The union produced at least two sons, Alexander and Jesse. Tinatin may also have been the mother of Levan's two other sons, George and Nikoloz, the future Catholicos of the Georgian Orthodox Church.

== Divorce and later life ==
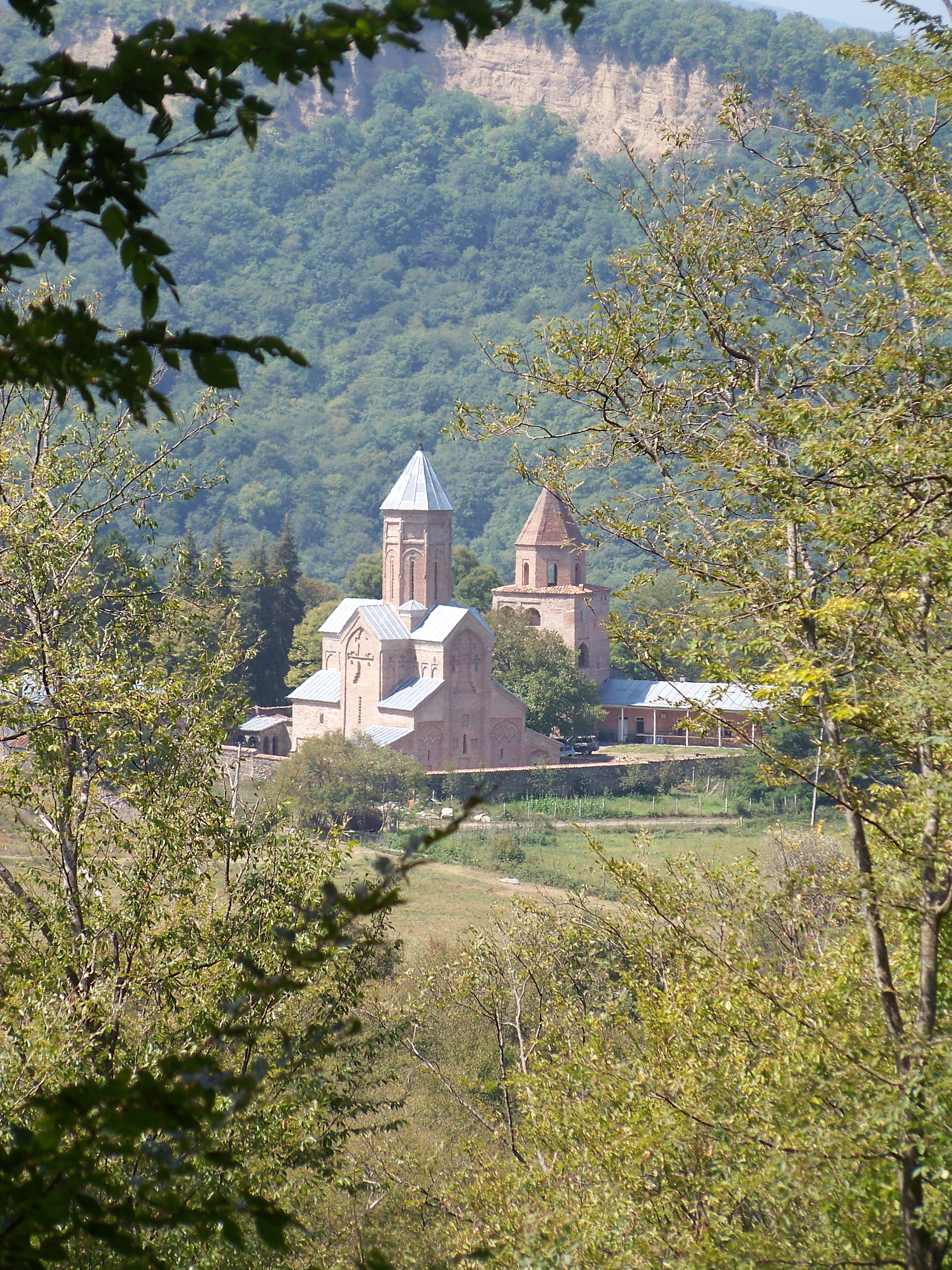
Akhali Shuamta monastery

Levan was, in the words of the Georgian chronicles, "a lover of whoring and fornication". His subjects, whom Levan's reign brought relative peace and prosperity, were inclined to overlook his frailties. Tinatin was not, however. She requested and was granted a divorce in 1529. The queen retired to the Shuamta nunnery, built at her behest and on her dowry. The monastery came to be known as Akhali Shuamta, that is, "the new Shuamta", in contrast to Dzveli Shuamta, "the old Shuamta", a nearby located medieval convent, which had been abandoned by Tinatin's time. The monastery, which the queen built, has been functional into the 21st century, except for the hiatus of the Soviet rule.

After the divorce, Levan married a daughter of the shamkhal of Tarki. Incensed at Tinatin's decision, he further disowned her children and favored his offspring of his second marriage, giving rise to a family feud after his death in 1574. His son by Tinatin, Alexander II, eventually emerged victorious. Tinatin continued to live at the Shuamta convent until her death there in 1591. She was buried in that monastery, far from her ex-husband, as she had requested.

== Coat of arms ==
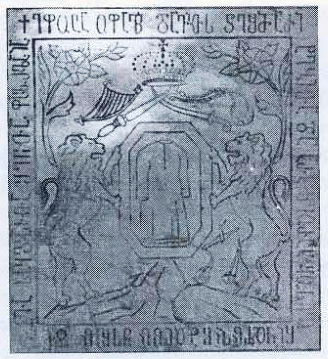
The coat of arms on Tinatin's gravestone in Shuamta.

Tinatin's gravestone at the Akhali Shuamta church depicts a heraldic design carved on it, the earliest surviving representation of the coat of arms of the Bagrationi dynasty, to which her husband belonged.

The coat of arms consists of a rectangular shield (escutcheon) which contains a smaller octagonal shield (inescutcheon), depicting the Seamless robe of Jesus, a sacred relic of the Georgian Orthodox Church, and supported by two lions rampant and surmounted by a royal crown, beneath which there are crossed royal scepter and sword. A harp and a sling n the left upper and right upper quarters of the shield, respectively, allude to the Bagrationi's claim of descent from the biblical king David. The scales in the left lower quarter symbolize the justice of Solomon, David's son. The detail in the right lower quarter is unrecognizable, but it could have been a royal orb. Surrounding the armorial achievement are the verses inscribed in the medieval Georgian asomtavruli script: "The Lord hath sworn in truth unto David; he will not turn from it; Of the fruit of the body will I set upon the throne" (Psalm 132: 11) and "the coat was without seam, woven from the top throughout" (John 19.23).

== Ancestry ==
Ancestors of Tinatin Gurieli

16. Mamia III Dadiani
8. Kakhaber II Gurieli
17. Daughter of David of Trebizond
4. Giorgi I Gurieli
9. Ana N.
2. Mamia I Gurieli
1. Tinatin Gurieli

Royal titles
Preceded by Elene Cholokashvili	Queen consort of Kakheti c. 1520–1529	Succeeded by Daughter of the Shamkhal of Tarku
