= Prince El-Mirza of Kakheti =

El-Mirza or Elimurza (Georgian: ელ-მირზა, ელიმურზა; fl. 1532–1580) was a Georgian prince (batonishvili) of the royal house of Kakheti, son of King Levan of Kakheti by his second wife, a daughter of Kamal Kara-Musel, shamkhal of Tarki. His attempt to seize the throne of Kakheti after Levan's death in 1574 was defeated by his half-brother, Alexander II. El-Mirza appears to have died during this fighting.

== Biography ==
El-Mirza was born of Levan of Kakheti's second marriage to a daughter of Kamal Kara-Musel, the shamkhal of Tarki in Dagestan. After the death of Levan in 1574, El-Mirza put forward claims to the throne of Kakheti. His eldest brother and Levan's heir apparent, Prince George, had been killed in 1561 and his older half-brother, Alexander, had been disowned by Levan.

On his father's death, El-Mirza and his brothers, Khosro and Vakhtang, seized control of Kakheti. Alexander quickly countermoved by having himself crowned as king at Bodbe with the help of the Upper Kakhetians. He further enlisted support of his in-laws from the neighboring Kingdom of Kartli, whose ruler, David XI, sent in an army under the command of Prince Bardzim Amilakhori, Alexander's father-in-law, and Elizbar, Duke of Ksani. Facing the intervention, El-Mirza and his brothers saw their troops defecting to Alexander and had to rely on the support of the shamkhal and the Lezgins, but were beaten at the battle of Torga. According to the 18th-century Georgian historian, Prince Vakhushti, the three brothers were killed in this confrontation, but El-Mirza appears to have been alive in 1580. El-Mirza was married to the certain Ketevan, by whom he had a son, Iovel (fl. 1580).

== Ancestry ==
Ancestors of Prince El-Mirza of Kakheti

16. George VIII of Georgia
8. Alexander I of Kakheti
17. Tamar N. or Nestan-Darejan N.
4. George II of Kakheti
9. Nestan-Darejan N.
2. Levan of Kakheti
10. Garsevan Cholokashvili
5. Ana Cholokashvili
1. El-Mirza
6. Kamal Kara-Musel of Tarki
3. N. of Tarki
