= Akura church =

Medieval Georgian Orthodox monastery

Akura church of Saint David
- აკურის მამადავითის ეკლესია
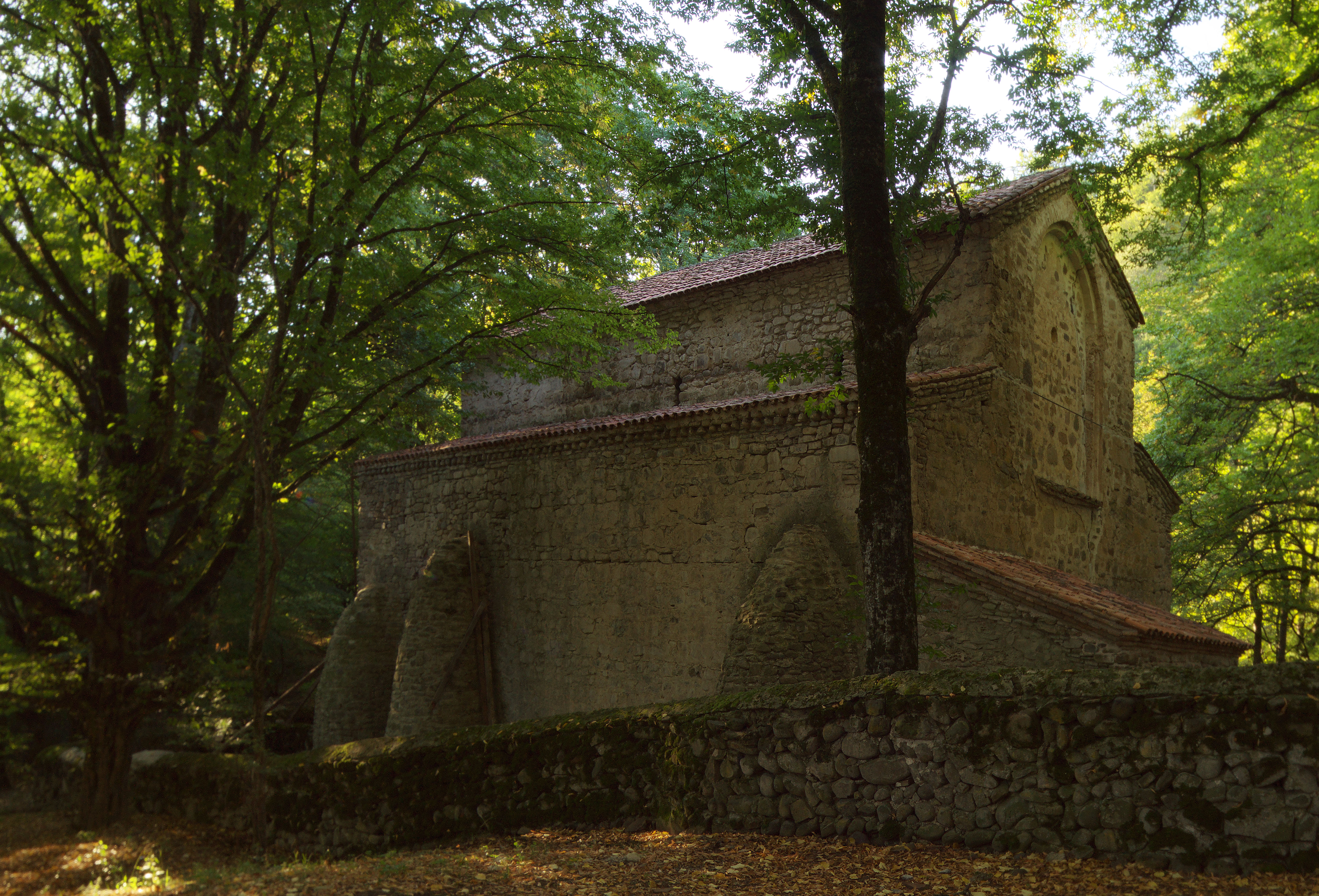
- Akura church of Saint David
- Location: Akura, Telavi Municipality; Kakheti, Georgia
- Coordinates: 41.850746°N 45.592175°E
- Type: Three-nave basilica

The Akura church of Saint David (Georgian: აკურის მამადავითის ეკლესია, romanized: ak'uris mamadavitis ek'lesia) is a medieval Georgian Orthodox monastery in the eastern Georgian region of Kakheti. Dated stylistically to the 9th century, it is a three-nave basilica, dedicated to St. David of Gareja, one of the Thirteen Assyrian Fathers. It is inscribed on the list of the Immovable Cultural Monuments of National Significance of Georgia.

== History ==
The Akura church stands in a forest on the right bank of the Vantiskhevi, a tributary of the Alazani, some 1.5 km southwest of the village of Akura, Telavi Municipality, in Georgia's easternmost region of Kakheti. The art historian Giorgi Chubinashvili identified Akura with an unnamed nunnery established by the monk Hilarion the Georgian for his mother and sister around 855. The Akura monastery was then a metochion of the David Gareja Lavra. In 1597, the church was refurbished by King Alexander II of Kakheti on the occasion of retirement of the king's elder sister Ketevan to the Akura convent.

== Layout ==
The Akura church is a three-nave basilica, rectangular in plan and measuring 17.3 × 12.8 metres. It is built of cobblestone and brick. The middle nave terminates on the east in a sanctuary with a horseshoe-shaped apse and a small bema in front of it. A semicircular conch rests upon simply profiled imposts. The lateral naves are separated from the middle one by a single arched column on each side. The northern nave is divided up by a transverse wall into two arched bays. At the eastern end of the lateral naves there are small rectangular chambers, acting as pastophoria. The western wall in the interior preserves fragments of the 14th–15th-century frescoes. The façades bear decorative aches, a feature that would become popular in Georgia in the centuries to come. The eastern façade is also adorned with wall paintings—medallions with the images of Jesus Christ and surrounding angels. On the eastern and western façades there are also four partially damaged inscriptions in the medieval Georgian asomtavruli script, paleographically dated to the 9th century. A porch, buttresses attached to the north façade, and an iconostasis all date to the 16th century.
