= Gremi =

Citadel in Georgia

Gremi გრემი
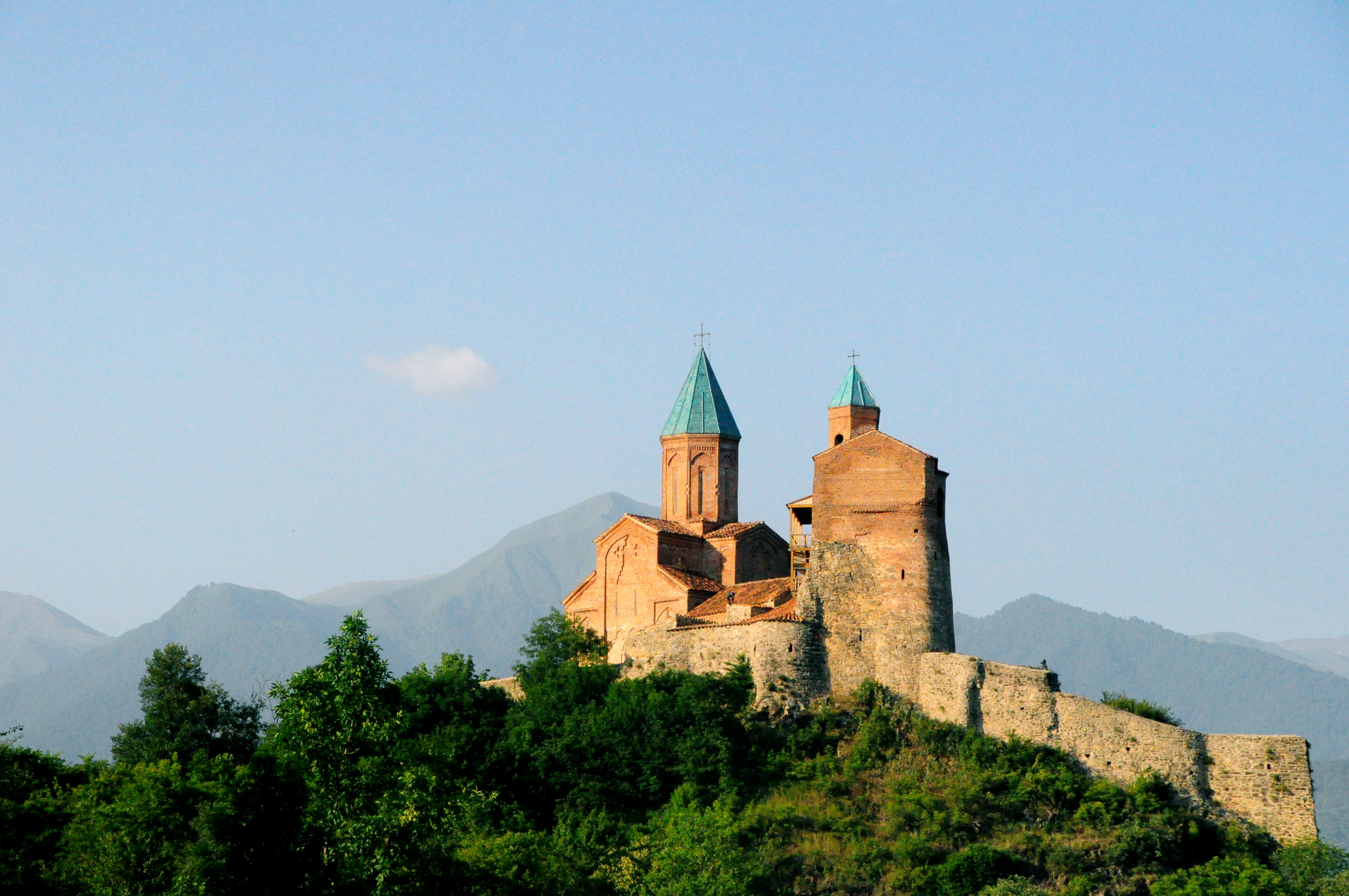
- Gremi

- Location within Georgia

Religion
- Affiliation: Georgian Orthodox Church
- Region: Caucasus

Location
- Location: Kakheti Province (Mkhare), Georgia
- Coordinates: 42.002047°N 45.660031°E

Architecture
- Founder: Levan of Kakheti
- Completed: 1565–1577

Gremi (Georgian: გრემი) is a 16th-century architectural monument – the royal citadel and the Church of the Archangels – in Kakheti, Georgia. The complex is what has survived from the once flourishing town of Gremi and is located southwest of the present-day village of the same name in the Kvareli district, 115 kilometers east of Tbilisi, capital of Georgia.

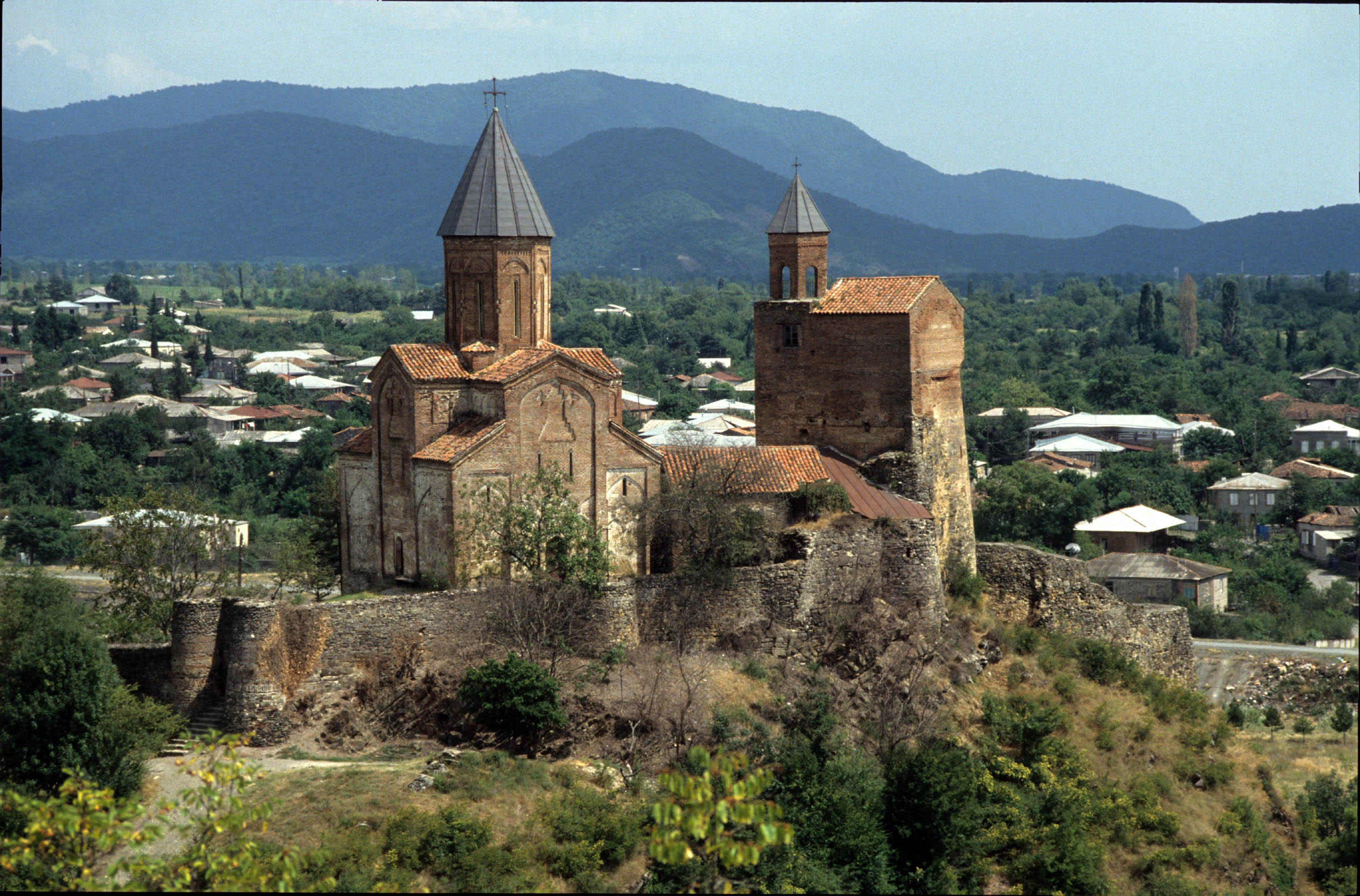
Gremi

== History ==
Gremi was the capital of the Kingdom of Kakheti in the 16th and 17th centuries. Founded by Levan of Kakheti, it functioned as a lively trading town on the Silk Road and royal residence until being razed to the ground by the armies of Shah Abbas I of Persia in 1615. The town never regained its past prosperity and the kings of Kakheti transferred their capital to Telavi in the mid-17th century.

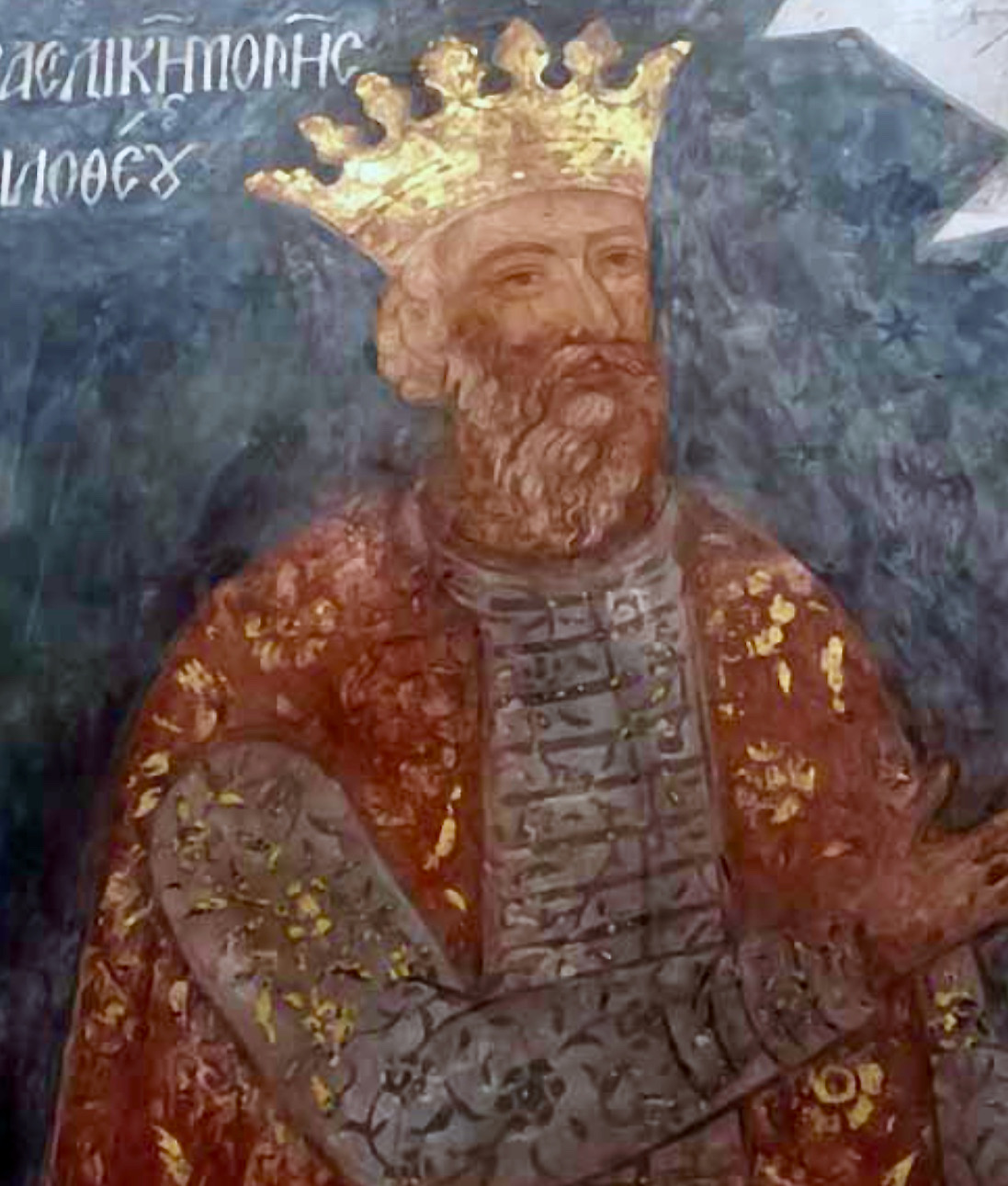
King Levan, who commissioned Gremi

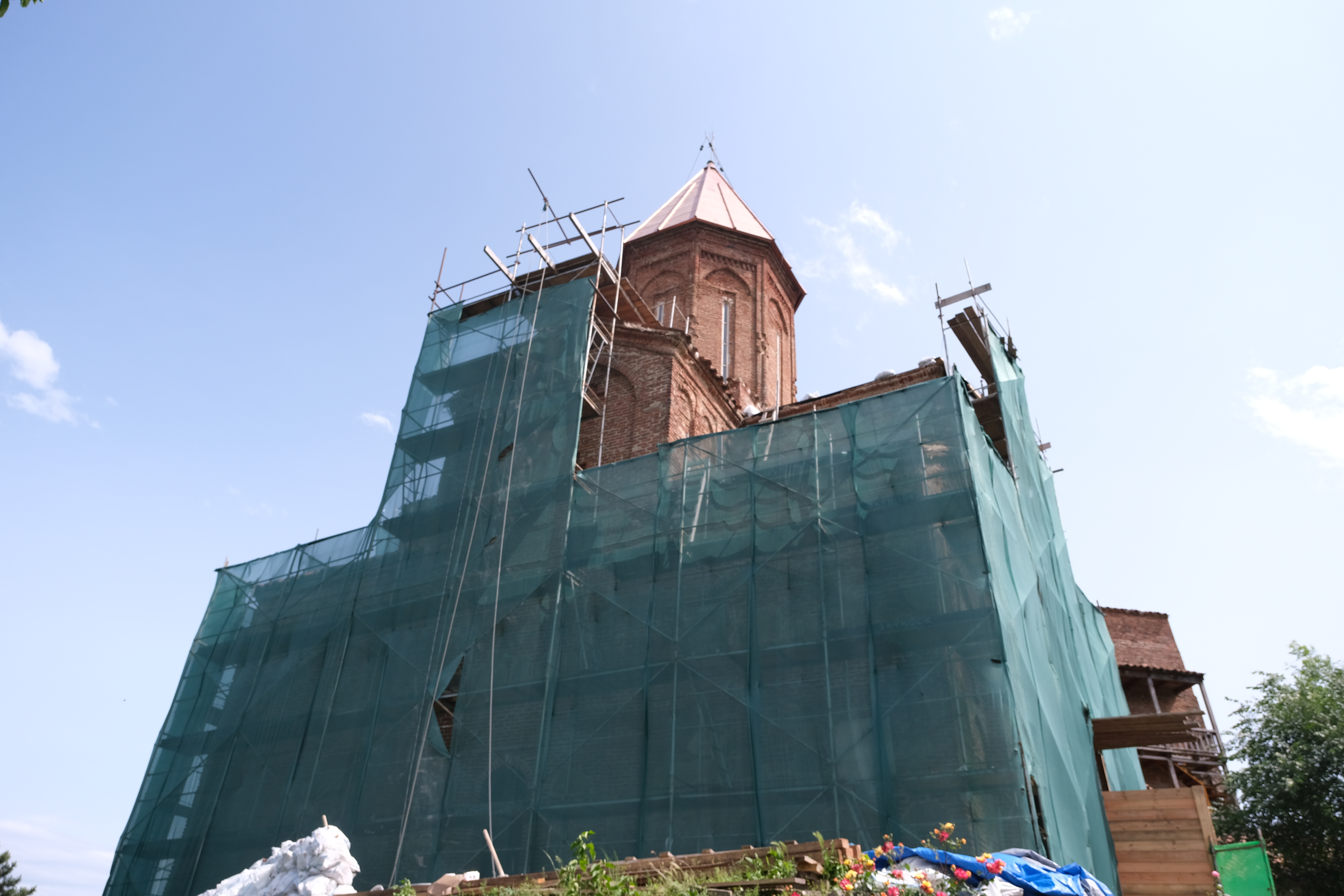
View of the Archangels' Church in May 2025, showing scaffolding from ongoing conservation work

The town appears to have occupied the area of approximately 40 hectares and to have been composed of three principal parts – the Archangels’ Church complex, the royal residence and the commercial neighborhood. Systematic archaeological studies of the area guided by A. Mamulashvili and P. Zak’araia were carried out in 1939-1949 and 1963-1967, respectively. Since 2007, the monuments of Gremi have been proposed for inclusion into the UNESCO World Heritage Sites.

== Architecture ==
The Archangels’ Church complex is located on a hill and composed of the Church of the Archangels Michael and Gabriel itself, a three-story castle, a bell tower and a wine cellar (marani). It is encircled by a wall secured by embrasures, turrets and towers. Remains of the secret tunnel leading to the Ints’obi River have also survived.

The Church of the Archangels was constructed at the behest of King Levan of Kakheti (r. 1520–1574) in 1565 and frescoed by 1577. It is a cruciform domed church built chiefly of stone. Its design marries traditional Georgian masonry with a local interpretation of the contemporary Iranian architectural taste. The building has three entrances, one facing west, one facing to the south, and the third facing to the north. The interior is crowned with a dome supported by the corners of the sanctuary and two basic piers. The façade is divided into three arched sections. The dome sits on an arcaded drum which is punctured by eight windows.

The bell-tower also houses a museum where several archaeological artifacts and the 16th-century cannon are displayed. The walls are adorned with a series of portraits of the kings of Kakheti by the modern Georgian painter Levan Chogoshvili (1985).
