= Prince Jesse of Kakheti =

Georgian prince royal (died 1580)

- Died: 1580
- Spouse: Daughter of Sam Mirza
- Issue Among others: Bagrat
- Dynasty: Bagrationi
- Father: Levan of Kakheti
- Mother: Tinatin Gurieli

Jesse (Georgian: იესე, romanized: iese), also known as Isa Khan Gorji (Persian: عیسی خان گرجی; died 1580) was a Georgian prince of the royal house of Kakheti, whose career flourished in the service of the Safavid dynasty of Iran and included several years as a governor of Shaki in what is today Azerbaijan.

== Early life ==
Jesse was a son of King Levan of Kakheti by his first wife Tinatin Gurieli. As a young prince, Jesse was placed by his father at the head of the Georgian auxiliaries requested by the Safavid shah Tahmasp I during his war with the Ottoman Empire (1532–55). After the conclusion of the peace, Jesse was left as a hostage in Iran, where he converted to Islam and became known as 'Isa Khan Gorji. In 1558 or 1560 he was made by Shah Tahmasp I governor of Shaki, a Muslim city close to the border of his homeland. At his investiture, he was also elevated to the rank of farzand ("son") by the Safavid king. Jesse could have been an unnamed Georgian prince reported by the English explorer Anthony Jenkinson as attending his audience with Shah Tahmasp on 20 November 1562. Alternatively, the Georgian prince is identified with Daud Khan, brother of King Simon I of Kartli.

== Career in the Safavid service ==
In 1576, 'Isa Khan became embroiled in a power struggle following the death of Shah Tahmasp. He was part of the Qazvin-based Georgian faction, including Tahmasp's Georgian widow Zahra Baji, a Shalikashvili princess, which tried to secure the succession for Tahmasp's younger son Haydar. But a rival faction, dominated by the Sunni nobles, had Haydar murdered at Qazvin and placed Ismail II on the throne. According to the 17th-century historian, Iskandar Beg Munshi, 'Isa Khan was imprisoned together with another Georgian, Simon I of Kartli, at Alamut, and was liberated with him by Shah Ismail. Munshi may have confused him with Archil, son of Bagrat, Prince of Mukhrani. On the accession of Shah Mohammad Khodabanda in 1578, 'Isa Khan was again in favor. Together with Simon and yet another Georgian, Shah Rustam the Lur, he was present at the coronation of Khodabanda and the three received the honor of kissing the shah's feet. 'Isa Khan's allegiance to the Safavids was cemented, in 1578, by his marriage to a daughter of Sam Mirza, Shah Tahmasp I's half-brother and Ismail I's son, by his wife, a daughter of Husain Khan-e Shamlu. That same year, 'Isa Khan had to take flight before the Ottoman army of Lala Kara Mustafa Pasha. He then returned to Christianity and fled to his homeland, where died shortly thereafter, in 1580.

== Children ==
Jesse had four children:

- Prince Bagrat (died after 1607), a prisoner of the Safavids for twenty years (1580–1600), he thereafter departed for Russia, where he was living as Prince Pankrati Yesseyevich Gruzinsky as of 1607.
- Prince Mahmad-Mirza (fl. 1580).
- Prince Khosro (died after 1574).
- An anonymous daughter (fl. 1605).

== Ancestry ==
Ancestors of Prince Jesse of Kakheti

16. George VIII of Georgia
8. Alexander I of Kakheti
17. Tamar N. or Nestan-Darejan N.
4. George II of Kakheti
9. Nestan-Darejan N.
2. Levan of Kakheti
10. Garsevan Cholokashvili
5. Ana Cholokashvili
1. Jesse (Isa-Khan)
24. Kakhaber II Gurieli
12. Giorgi I Gurieli
25. Ana N.
6. Mamia I Gurieli
3. Tinatin Gurieli

== Sources ==
- Floor, Willem (2001). Safavid Government Institutions. Costa Mesa, California: Mazda Publishers. ISBN 978-1568591353.
- Floor, Willem M. (2008). Titles and Emoluments in Safavid Iran: A Third Manual of Safavid Administration, by Mirza Naqi Nasiri. Washington, DC: Mage Publishers. p. 280. ISBN 978-1933823232.
- Karchava, Tea (2018). "აღმოსავლეთში ინგლისელთა სავაჭრო და დიპლომატიური მიზნებისა და საქართველოს ისტორიის ზოგიერთი საკითხის დაზუსტებისთვის (ენტონი ჯენკინსონის რელაციონის მიხედვით)" [England's commercial and diplomatic goals In the east and some issues of Georgian history (according to Anthony Jenkinson’s notes)]. Proceedings. Institute of Georgian History. Faculty of Humanities. Ivane Javakhishvili Tbilisi State University (in Georgian and English). 14 (14): 206–232.

Preceded by Tuygun Sultan Qajar	Governor of Shaki (1st term); 1558/1560-1563	Succeeded by Ali Khan Beg (aka, Qezel' Ali Khan)
Preceded by Shamkhal Sultan Cherkes	Governor of Shaki (2nd term); 1577-?	Succeeded by Shahmir Khan (aka, Shah Amir Khan)
