= Levan of Kakheti =

Levan
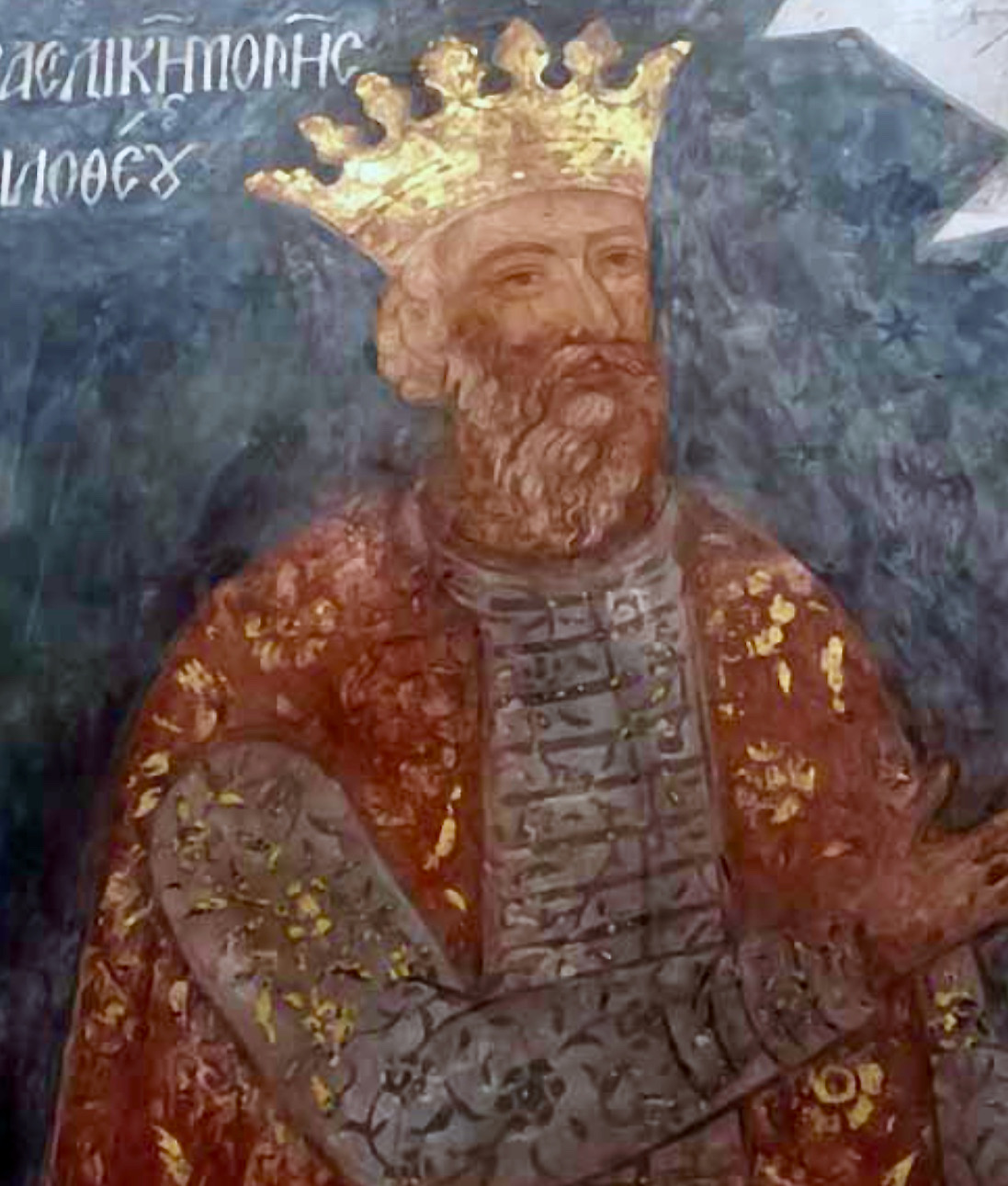
- Fresco of King Levan from the Philotheou monastery.

King of Kakheti
- Reign: 1518–1574
- Predecessor: Interregnum
- Successor: Alexander II
- Born: 1504
- Died: 1574 (aged 69–70)
- Spouse: Tinatin Gurieli (divorced): Unnamed daughter of Shamkhal Kamal Kara-Musel
- Issue Among others: Prince George; Prince Jesse; Alexander II of Kakheti; Prince El-Mirza; Catholicos-Patriarch Nicholas V; Nestan-Darejan, Queen of Kartli
- Dynasty: Bagrationi
- Father: George II of Kakheti
- Mother: Helen Cholokashvili
- Religion: Georgian Orthodox Church
- Khelrtva

Levan (also Leon; Georgian: ლევან [ლეონ]; 1504–1574), was a Georgian monarch of the Bagrationi dynasty, who reigned as king (mepe) of Kakheti in eastern Georgia from 1518 to 1574. He presided over the most prosperous and peaceful period in the history of the Kakhetian realm.

Levan's presumed tomb was discovered in the south-western corner of the Gremi church in 2021.

== Biography ==
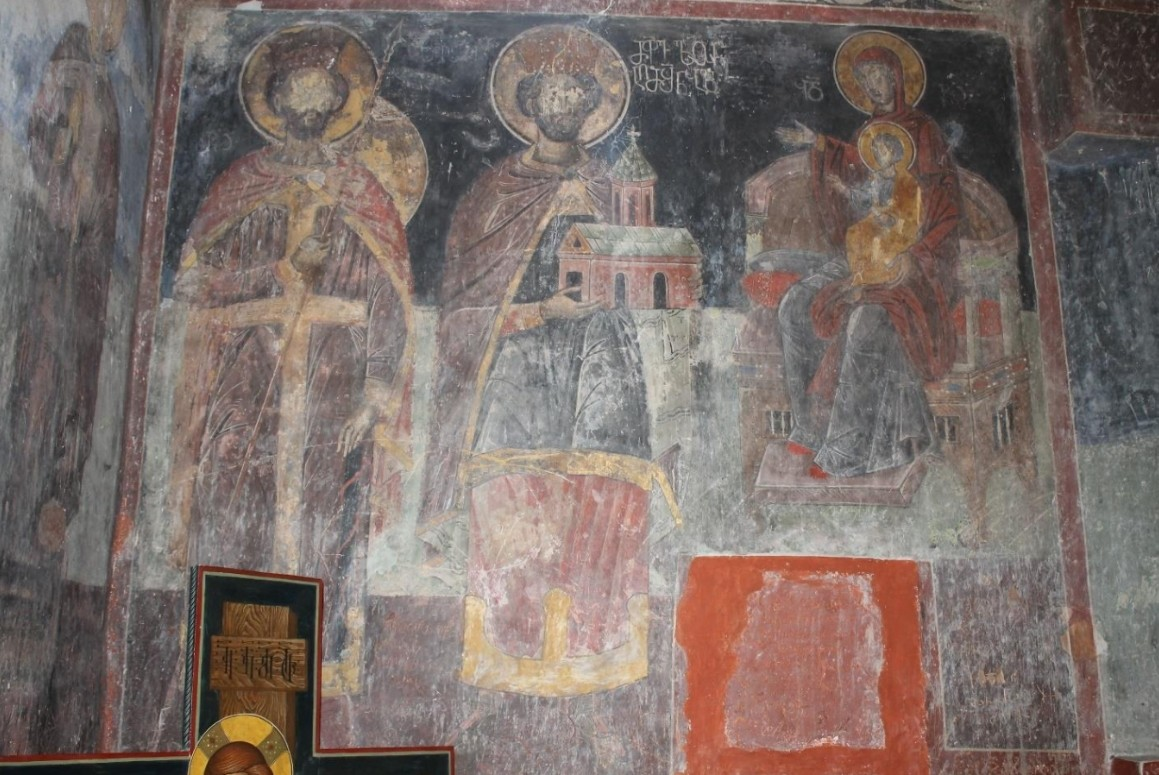
Levan, fresco from Church of the Archangels, Gremi.

He was the son of George II of Kakheti by his wife, Princess Helen Irubakidze-Cholokashvili. George II led a series of unsuccessful raids into his western neighbor, kingdom of Kartli, ruled by a rival branch of the Bagrationi. In 1513, he was captured and put in prison, while his kingdom was taken over by David X of Kartli. Levan was taken by loyal nobles to the mountains and kept there clandestinely until 1518, when they capitalized on the invasion of Kartli by Ismail I, the Safavid Shah of Iran, and proclaimed Levan king of Kakheti. David X led his army against Kakheti, but failed to capture Levan and withdrew. In 1520, the two kings made peace and forged an alliance.

Having secured the crown, Levan forced the highlanders of eastern Georgia into submission and established friendly relations with the Shamkhal of Tarki in Dagestan. In 1521, he mounted an expedition against Hassan-Bey, the ruler of Shaki in Shirvan, took the city and had Hassan executed.

Shaki was under the patronage of Iran, and when Ismail I marched against Kakheti, Levan's courage began to falter. He officially accepted the shah's suzerainty and agreed to pay tribute. He reaffirmed his loyalty to the new shah, Tahmasp I, in 1541, and even helped him subdue rebellious Shaki in 1551.

In virtue of the Treaty of Amasya signed in 1555, the Ottoman and Safavid empires divided the South Caucasus into two spheres of influence, with Kakheti falling into the Iranian orbit. Pressured by the presence of an Iranian army near the Kakhetian borders, Levan had to send his son Vakhtang (also known as Jesse) as a political hostage to the Saffavid court where the prince was converted to Islam, named Isa-Khan and appointed as governor of Shaki. In 1561, Jesse was forced to deny aid to his son-in-law Simon I of Kartli, who was then fighting against the Iranians. He allowed, however, his beloved son George to volunteer on the side of Simon, but the Georgian army was crushed at the battle of Tsikhedidi and George himself died on the battlefield.

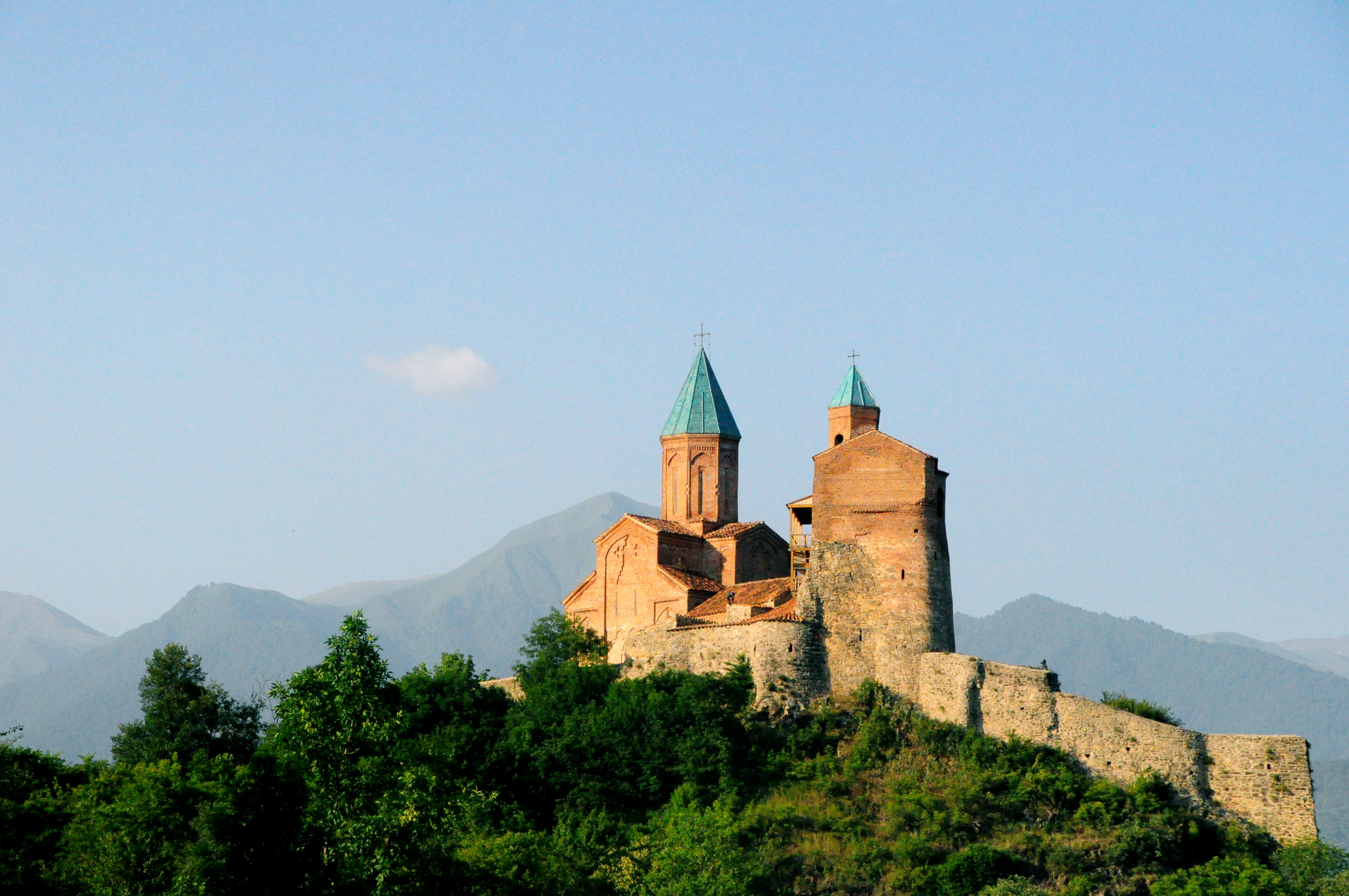
The Gremi castle commissioned by Levan.

Henceforth, Levan attempted to counterbalance the Iranian hegemony by enlisting the Russian support and sent, in 1561, an embassy to Ivan IV. Levan's Russian contacts enabled him to recruit a detachment of Russian soldiers from the Terek Valley in 1564. The presence of a Russian contingent in Kakheti drew an official protest from Iran, and Levan was forced to disband it in 1571.

In general, Kakheti remained a peaceful country during Levan's reign. Flanked by the Gilan-Shemakha-Astrakhan "silk route", the kingdom was actively involved in the regional trade. In contrast to other parts of Georgia, the towns and countryside prospered and attracted people from the harassed lands of Kartli, as well as Armenian and Persian merchants and craftsmen.

Levan was known as a significant royal patron of culture, and his portraits survive in many of the churches he endowed, including Gremi.

Levan died in 1574, being survived by five sons among whom a violent dispute over succession soon broke out. According to the 18th-century Georgian historian Prince Vakhushti, the animosity between the brothers was at least partially precipitated by Levan's preferential treatment of his son by the second marriage over those by the first marriage, particularly Alexander, who was his eldest son, and, hence, the legitimate heir to the throne. Alexander, indeed, emerged victorious and became the next king of Kakheti.

== Family ==
Levan married twice. His first marriage was to Tinatin (died 1591), daughter of Mamia I Gurieli, Prince of Guria. Their children were:

- Prince George (died 1561), who was killed at the Battle of Tsikhedidi;
- Prince Jesse (died 1580);
- Alexander II of Kakheti (1527–1605), King of Kakheti (r. 1574–1605).

His second marriage was to an unnamed daughter of Shamkhal Kara-Musal. Their children were:

- Prince El-Mirza (fl. 1532–1580);
- Prince Constantine (fl. 1532–1549);
- Princess Nestan-Darejan (fl. 1556–1612), who married Simon I of Kartli;
- Prince Vakhtang (fl. 1549);
- Prince Heraclius (fl. 1549);
- Prince Teimuraz (fl. 1558–1568);
- Prince David (fl. 1553);
- Prince Bagrat (fl. 1549–1568);
- Prince Khosro (Kaikhosro) (fl. 1568);
- Nicholas V of Georgia (died 1591), Catholicos-Patriarch of Georgia from 1584 to 1591;
- Princess Ketevan (fl. 1559–1597), who married Prince Vakhushti Gogibashvili; she retired to the Akura Monastery in 1597;
- Princess Tekle (fl. 1597–1603), who was a nun at a nunnery at the Alaverdi Monastery and had an amorous affair with Prince Baram Cholokashvili, Bishop of Alaverdi. When the affair was revealed, Catholicos Domentius II excommunicated the couple, who sought refuge in Imereti. King Alexander II later allowed them to return to Kakheti and marry c. 1603;
- Princess Helen (fl. 1544–1550), who married Heraclius, son of Bagrat, Prince of Mukhrani.

== Bibliography ==
- Lordkipanidze, Mariam; Metreveli, Roin (2000). Sakʻartʻvelos mepʻeebi (in Georgian). Tbilisi: Nekeri. ISBN 9992858362.

Preceded by Interregnum	King of Kakheti; 1518–1574	Succeeded by Alexander II
