= Prince George of Kakheti (died 1561) =

George
- Died: 6 April 1561; Dzegvi
- Spouse: Unnamed daughter of Luarsab I
- Issue: Prince George; Prince Vakhtang; Prince Khosro
- Dynasty: Bagrationi
- Father: Levan of Kakheti
- Mother: Tinatin Gurieli
- Religion: Georgian Orthodox Church

George (Georgian: გიორგი, romanized: giorgi; died 6 April 1561) was a Georgian prince (batonishvili) of the royal house of Kakheti and the eldest son of King Levan of Kakheti. He was killed in 1561 in a battle with the Safavid Iranian army, fighting on the side of his brother-in-law, King Simon I of Kartli.

== Biography ==
George was the eldest son of King Levan of Kakheti and his first wife, Tinatin Gurieli. In 1561, Simon I of Kartli, ruler of a neighboring Georgian polity, offered Levan—his father-in-law—an alliance against the Safavid Iranian hegemony. Levan, anxious to preserve peace at home, was reluctant, but his son George volunteered with the Kakhetian army for Simon's cause. Arriving at Dzegvi to join the Kartlians, George's troops were attacked and annihilated, on the Easter Day on 6 April 1561, by the Safavid army under Shahverdi Sultan, a Qajar beylerbey of Karabakh, at the battle of Tsikhedidi. George himself was killed in action.

== Family ==
Prince George was married to an unnamed daughter of Luarsab I of Kartli. They had three sons:

- Prince George (fl. 1574);
- Prince Vakhtang (fl. 1574);
- Prince Khosro (fl. 1574), who was married to a certain Mariam.

On 7 March 1574, George's son Khosro, together with his wife Mariam and his brothers George and Vakhtang, issued a charter to Iotam Guramishvili.

On 3 May 1590, King Alexander II of Kakheti, while recounting to Prince Zvenigorodsky the story of the beginning of his reign, which is otherwise unattested in Georgian historical sources, stated that, after ascending the throne sixteen years earlier, he had been challenged by his nephew Khosro, the son of his elder brother, who waged war against him but was ultimately defeated and killed.

== Ancestry ==
Ancestors of Prince George of Kakheti (died 1561)

8. Alexander I of Kakheti
4. George II of Kakheti
9. Nestan-Darejan N.
2. Levan of Kakheti
10. Garsevan Cholokashvili
5. Ana Cholokashvili
1. George
12. George I Gurieli
6. Mamia I Gurieli
3. Tinatin Gurieli
